= Western Chalukya society =

South Indian Kannadiga dynasty

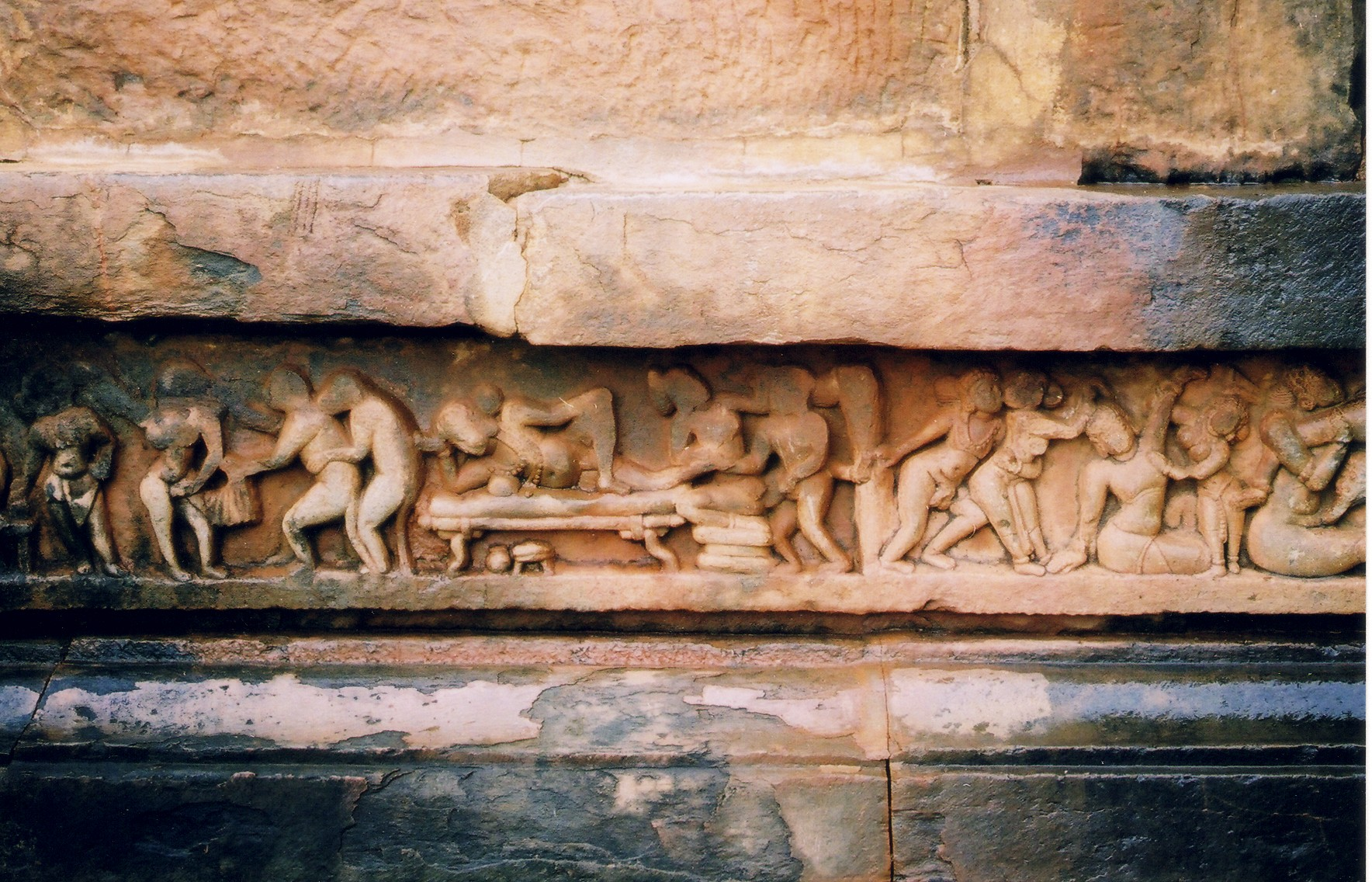
Kamasutra art, 1070, Tripurantakesvara Temple, Shimoga district

The Western Chalukyas (Kannada: ಪಶ್ಚಿಮ ಚಾಲುಕ್ಯರು) were a prominent South Indian Kannadiga dynasty who ruled most of western Deccan India during the 10th century - 12th century. They are also known as Kalyani Chalukya after their capital at Kalyani, known today as Basavakalyan in Karnataka state. Later Chalukya is another commonly used name for this empire from the popular theory that they were related to the 6th century Chalukya dynasty of Badami.

== Chalukya society ==
The rise of Veerashaivaism was revolutionary and challenged the prevailing Hindu caste system which nonetheless retained regal patronage. The role of women in society was varied and largely depended on their economic status and level of education in a period that may generally be considered liberal. This freedom was, however, more easily available to women in royal and affluent urban families. Records describe the participation of women in the fine arts, such as Chalukya queen Chandala Devi and Kalachuri queen Sovala Devi's skill in dance and music, compositions of thirty Vachana poets including the 12th century Virashaiva mystic Akka Mahadevi whose devotion to the bhakti movement is well known.

Contemporary records indicate some royal women were involved in administrative and martial affairs such as princess Akkadevi, (sister of King Jayasimha II) who fought and defeated rebellious feudals. Some important literary works of the time related to music and musical instruments were Sangita Chudamani, Sangita Samayasara and Sangitha Ratnakara. Inscriptions emphasise public acceptance of widowhood indicating that Sati though present was on a voluntary basis. Ritual deaths to achieve salvation are known with Jains preferring to fast to death (Sallekhana), while people of some other communities chose to jump on spikes (Shoolabrahma) or walking into fire on an eclipse.

In a Hindu caste system that was conspicuously present, Brahmins enjoyed a privileged position as imparters of knowledge and local justice. These Brahmins were normally involved in careers that revolved around religion and learning, with the exception of a few who achieved success in martial affairs. They were patronised by kings, nobles and wealthy aristocrats who induced learned Brahmins to settle in specific towns and villages by making them grants of land and home. Relocation of Brahmin scholars was calculated and in the interest of the kingdom as they were seen as a people of detachment from wealth and power and their knowledge was useful to impart education, ethical conduct and discipline in local communities. Brahmins were also actively involved in solving local daily problems by functioning as neutral arbiters (Panchayat).

In food habits, Brahmins, Jains, Buddhists and Shaivas were strictly vegetarian while consumption of different kinds of meat was popular with other communities. Vendors in the marketplace sold meat from domesticated animals such as goats, sheep, pigs and fowl as well as exotic meat from partridges, hares, wild fowl and boars. People found indoor amusement by attending wrestling matches (Kusti) or watching animal fights such as cock fights and ram fights or by gambling. Horse racing was a popular outdoor past time. In addition to these leisurely activities, festivals and fairs were plenty and often made entertaining by travelling troupes of acrobats, dancers, dramatists and musicians.

Schools and hospitals are mentioned in records and these were built in the vicinity of temples. Market places served as open air town halls where people gathered to discuss and consider local issues. Choirs, whose main function was to sing devotional hymns, were maintained at temple expense. Young men were trained to sing in choirs in schools attached to monasteries such as Hindu Matha, Jain Palli and Buddhist Vihara. These institutions provided advanced education in religion and ethics and were well equipped with libraries (Saraswati Bhandara). Learning was imparted in the local language and Sanskrit. Schools of higher learning were called Brahmapuri (or Ghatika or Agrahara). Teaching Sanskrit was a near monopoly of Brahmins who received royal endowments in their cause.

Inscriptions prove that the number of subjects taught varied from four to eighteen. The four subjects popular with students from royalty were Economics (Vartta), Political Science (Dandaniti), Veda (trayi) and Philosophy (Anvikshiki), subjects that find mention as early as Kautilya's Arthashastra. Other subjects (Vidya) were the four Vedas, six auxiliary subjects (Angas) namely Phonetics, Prosody, Grammar, Etymology, Astronomy and Ritual (Purana), Logic (Tarka), Exegesis (Mimamsa) and Law (Dharmasastra). To this were added Medicine (Ayurveda), Archery (Dhanurveda), Music (Gandharvaveda) and Politics (Arthashastra) to complete what seems a comprehensive list of subjects. Well known centers of learning (from a present-day geographical perspective) were at Bagevadi, Kadalevad and Manigavalli in Bijapur district, Nargund and Hottur in Dharwad district, Balligavi in Shimoga district, and Nagayi in Kalaburagi district.
