= Anuvanahalli =

- village
- Location in Karnataka, India Anuvanahalli (India)
- Coordinates: 13.802783°N 76.032215°E
- Country: India
- State: Karnataka
- District: Chikkamagaluru

Population (2001)
  - Total: 1,017

Languages
  - Official: Kannada
- Time zone: UTC+5:30 (IST)

Anuvanahalli is a panchayat village in the hobli of Shivani, Tarikere, Chikkamagaluru, Karnataka, India.

It is famous for its traditional festivals such as the Shree Uma Maheshwara Jathra, And gosi biralingeshwra Prasan jathra, held annually around December/January. Anuvanahalli also has a reputation for having produced an exceptionally large number of tradespeople and entrepreneurs in the fields of Jaanapada, Ranga Bhoomi and Veera Gaase.

== Demographics ==
Anuvanahalli has a total population of 1,017 people, composed of 492 males and 525 females.

Anuvanahalli is situated in what is known as the "Bayalu Seeme" part of the Chikkamagaluru district. Lingayatism is the primary religion of this area, with local adherents taking sadāchāra (attention to vocation and duty) as the primary aachara of the five Panchacharas. For this reason they are often labeled saadaru, sadaru or Sadu Lingayath. Anuvanahhalli having large number of saadhu Lingayath as well as kuruba community.

A large proportion of the World War II generation are teachers, which may account for its relatively high socio-economic position. As compared to nearby villages of equal size, Anuvanahalli has an above-average literacy rate.

== Agriculture ==
Agriculture is the major occupation of the region. Raagi, jowar (sorghum), ground nuts, onion, coconuts are the crops typically grown in this region.

== See also ==
- Veerashaivism
- Basava
- Vachanas
- Veeragase
- Shakthi-Vishista Advaitha
