= Anubhava Mantapa =

Religious complex in Karnataka, India

- ಅನುಭವ ಮಂಟಪ ಬಸವಕಲ್ಯಾಣ

Religion
- Affiliation: Hinduism
- Sect: Lingayatism
- District: Bidar district
- Region: Kalyana-Karnataka
- Ecclesiastical or organisational status: under construction; Religious Parliament
- Ownership: Ma.gha.Cha Dr. Basavalinga Pattadevaru (president)
- Governing body: Government of Karnataka
- Year consecrated: 12th Century

Location
- Location: Tipranth, Basavakalyan, Bidar district, Karnataka, India
- Municipality: Basavakalyan
- State: Karnataka
- Country: India
- Interactive map of Anubhava Mantapa
- Administration: Government of Karnataka
- Coordinates: 17.8508°N 76.9333°E

Architecture
- Founder: Basavanna
- Funded by: Government of Karnataka
- Established: 12th century
- Construction cost: ₹532 crore (US$55 million); ₹600 crore (US$62 million) (as per some news articles)

Specifications
- Capacity: 770 people
- Width: 1,884 feet (574 m)
- Site area: 101 acres (0.41 km^{2})
- Elevation: 182 ft (55 m)

Anubhava Mantapa, established by Basavanna in the 12th century C.E., is a religious complex located in Tipranth, Basavakalyan, in the Bidar district of Karnataka. It is the first religious parliament in the world, whose name is literally translated as "experience pavilion", and was an academy of mystics, saints and philosophers of the lingayat faith in the 12th century. It was the source of essentially all religious and philosophical thought pertaining to the lingayat, and was presided over by the mystic Allama Prabhu, with numerous Sharanas from all over Karnataka and other parts of India participating.

This institution was also the fountainhead of Vachana literature, which was used as the means by which Veerashaiva religious and philosophical thought was propagated. Other giants of veerashaiva theosophy, including Akka Mahadevi, Channabasavanna, and Basavanna himself, were active at the Anubhava Mantapa. The Anubhava Mantapa is also called the Mahaamane.

Prime Minister Narendra Modi referred to Anubhava Mantapa in his speech during the inauguration of a new parliamentary building, stating that the Anubhava Mantapa established by Basavanna in the 12th century is the foundation of parliamentary democracy.

== History ==
Anubhava Mantapa, or Shivanubhav Mantapa, was a 12th-century academy of mystics, saints, and philosophers of the ‘Lingayath’ faith. It was the fount of all religious and philosophical thought pertaining to Hindu and Shaivite values and ethics. It was presided over by the mystic Allama Prabhu, and numerous Sharanas from all over Karnataka and other parts of India participated.

The Sharanas came from all social strata, and participated without discrimination: men, women, Dalits, Shudras, Brahmins, Vaishyas - all were one, and they were all classless, united as ardent followers of Lord Shiva. These participants were provided equal opportunities by the social reformer Basaveshwara, encouraged to depend on their own work, to think rationally, and to contribute back to society through "Daasoha".

This institution was also the source of Vachana literature, the medium through which the Sharanas' views and philosophical thought were propagated. Other theosophic Sharanas and Sharanes, such as Akka Mahadevi and Channabasavanna, were also participants in the Anubhava Mantapa. It was in many ways a unique socio-spiritual revolution for the establishment of an egalitarian society. The members of the Shivanubhav Mantap worked to build a vibrant, casteless, creedless society focused on the propagation of human values through Vachanas, and the primary deity of Lord Shiva, in a non-mainstream manner.

The movement spearheaded by Basava at Anubhava Mantapa became the basis of a sect which gave rise to a system of ethics and education at once simple and exalted. It sought to inspire ideals of social and religious freedom such as no previous faith on Earth had done. In the medieval era in India, characterized as it was by Islamic invasions and oppression, this helped to shed a ray of light and faith on the homes and hearts of people. But that egalitarian spirit was soon crushed when the intermarriage that Basava encouraged was abruptly punished by the King. The dream of a classless society was shaken, and Basava, recognising this bleak outlook, soon left for Kudala Sangama, and a year later died.

The movement produced literature of considerable value in the vernacular of the country, which ultimately attained the dignified status of a classical tongue. Its aim was the elimination of the barriers of caste, to obliterate untouchability, raising the untouchable to the equal status of the high-born. The sanctity of family relations and the improvement in the condition of womanhood were striven for while, at the same time, the importance of rites and rituals, of fasts and pilgrimages, was reduced.

It encouraged learning and contemplation of God by way of love and faith. The excesses of polytheism were deplored and the idea of monotheism was fostered. The movement tended, in many ways, to raise the nation generally to a higher level of capacity both in thought and action. However, the sect failed to realise a completely classless society.
