= Allama Prabhu =

12th-century Veerashaiva saint and Vachana poet

Allamaprabhu

Personal life
- Born: Early 12th century Balligavi, Shimoga district, Karnataka, Bharat
- Died: 12th or 13th century
- Resting place: Mulgund near Gadag, Karnataka (gadduge)
- Known for: Lingayat/Sharana movement

Religious life
- Religion: Hinduism
- Sect: Lingayat

Quotation

Wherever one steps on earth is a pilgrim place

Allamaprabhu was a 12th-century Lingayat-saint and Vachana poet (called Vachanakara) of the Kannada language, propagating the unitary consciousness of Self and Shiva. (Note: shivayoga.net, Psychological Aspects of Shiva-yoga) Allamaprabhu is one of the celebrated poets and the patron saint (Note: Prabhu, lit, "Master"),) of the Lingayata (Note: lit, "Devotees of the god Shiva) movement that reshaped medieval Karnataka society and popular Kannada literature. He is included among the "Trinity of Lingayathism", along with Basavanna, the founder of the movement, and Akka Mahadevi, the most prominent woman poet.

Allamaprabhu used poetry, now part of Vachana Sahitya literature, to criticise rituals and social conventions, to break down social barriers and to emphasize moral values and devotional worship of Shiva. It is well accepted that though Basavanna was the inspiration behind the Lingayath movement and earned the honorific "elder brother" (anna) at the "mansion of experience" (Anubhava Mantapa), Allama was the real guru who presided over it.

According to the scholars K. A. Nilakanta Sastri and Joseph T. Shipley, Vachana literature comprises pithy pieces of poetic prose in easy to understand, yet compelling Kannada language. The scholar E. P. Rice characterises Vachana poems as brief parallelistic allusive poems, each ending with one of the popular local names of the god Shiva and preaching the common folk detachment from worldly pleasures and adherence to devotion to the god Shiva (Shiva Bhakti).

== Biography ==
The biographical details of Allamaprabhu that can be historically verified are scanty, and much that is known about him is from hagiographic legends. Some details of the early life of Allama are available in the writings of noted Hoysala poet Harihara, while other accounts are generally considered legendary. Allamaprabhu was born in Shivamogga district of Karnataka, India, in the 12th century, to Sujnani and Nirashankara. He was a contemporary of the other famous Lingayat devotee-poets (sharanas), Basavanna and Akka Mahadevi. According to Harihara's biography of Allama, the earliest account of the saint's life, he was a temple drummer in modern Shivamogga district, Karnataka state, India. He came from a family of temple performers, was himself an expert at playing a type of drum called maddale, and his father was a dance teacher.

Allamaprabhu married a dancer named Kamalathe, but she died prematurely. The grief-stricken Allama wandered aimlessly, arriving at a cave temple, where he met the saint Animisayya (or Animisha, "the open eyed one"). The saint gave him a linga icon, blessed him with knowledge on god, and, Allama was enlightened and transformed into a seeker of spirituality. Allama's pen name, (ankita or mudra), Guheshvara the god who stays with every one in the heart cave (also spelt Guheswara or Guhesvara, lit, "Lord of the caves"), which he used in most of his poems is said to be a celebration of his experience in the cave temple.

Allamaprabhu spread his message with songs, playing a lyre as he wandered from place to place. Most of his compositions were spontaneous and in vernacular language, but some were written in Sandhya Bhasha (a code filled language of secret doctrines understood by Yogi Sidhas), a riddle-filled questions-packed poetry in the Vedic and Upanishadic tradition.

Allama died in Kadalivana near Srishila (Andhra Pradesh), and legend has it that he "became one with the linga".

Sadhguru referred to Allamaprabhu as one of a kind in the whole history of humanity. He was an extraordinary being.

== Poems ==
Allamaprabhu's poetic style has been described as mystic and cryptic, rich in paradoxes and inversions (bedagu mode), staunchly against any form of symbolism, occult powers (siddhis) and their acquisition, temple worship, conventional systems and ritualistic practices, and even critical of fellow Veerashaiva devotees and poets. However, all his poems are non-sectarian and some of them even use straight forward language. About 1,300 hymns are attributed to him.

According to the Kannada scholar Shiva Prakash, Allama's poems are more akin to the Koans (riddles) in the Japanese Zen tradition, and have the effect of awakening the senses out of complacency. Critic Joseph Shipley simply categorises Allama's poems as those of a "perfect Jnani" ("saint"). Some of Allama's poems are known to question and probe the absolute rejection of the temporal by fellow Veerashaiva devotees–even Basavanna was not spared. A poem of his mocks at Akka Mahadevi for covering her nudity with tresses, while flaunting it to the world at the same time, in an act of rejection of pleasures. The scholar Basavaraju compiled 1321 extant poems of Allamaprabhu in his work Allamana Vachana Chandrike (1960). These poems are known to cover an entire range, from devotion to final union with God.

The poems give little information about Allama's early life and worldly experiences before enlightenment. In the words of the scholar Ramanujan, to a saint like Allama, "the butterfly has no memory of the caterpillar". His wisdom is reflected in his poems–only a small portion of which are on the devotee aspect (bhakta, poems 64–112). More than half of the poems dwell on the later phase (sthala) in the life of a saint, most are about union with god and of realization (aikya, poems 606–1321). His poems use the phrase "Lord of the caves" or "Guheswara" to refer to Shiva, and this practice states Subramanian is because Allamaprabhu received his enlightenment in a cave temple.

I saw the fragrance fleeing, when the bee came,
What a wonder!
I saw intellect fleeing, when the heart came.
I saw the temple fleeing, when God came.

— Allamaprabhu, Shiva Prakash 1997, pp. 179–180

The tiger-headed deer, the deer-headed tiger,
Joined at the waist.
Look, another came to chew close by
When the trunk with no head grazes dry leaves,
Look, all vanishes, O Guheswara.

— Allamaprabhu in Bedagu mode, Shiva Prakash 1997, p. 180

If the mountain feels cold, what will they cover it with?
If the fields are naked, what will they clothe them with?
If the devotee is wordly, what will they compare him with?
O! Lord of the caves!

— Allamaprabhu, Subramanian 2005, p. 219

Look here, the legs are two wheels;
the body is a wagon, full of things
Five men drive the wagon
and one man is not like another.
Unless you ride it in full knowledge of its ways
the axle will break
O Lord of Caves!

— Allamaprabhu, Ramanujan 1973, p. 149

== Worldview ==
=== Lingayat and the vachanakaras ===
Allama was devoted to the worship of Shiva. He used his vachanas to spread Lingayathism, which is monotheistic and nondualistic, and has a strong egalitarian message. Its philosophy and practice is presented in the Panchacaras, five codes of conduct, and the Shatsthala, six phases or steps toward unity with Shiva. For the vacanakaras (Vachana poets), "first-hand 'seeing' was more important to their poetry than theological formulations." Nevertheless, the Shatsthala system provides a narrative structure to the vachanas, portraying a progress toward the union with Shiva. Later anthologies, with the notable exception of the Shoonya Sampadane, followed this scheme in their arrangement of the vachanas.

Although Allamaprabhu and the Vacanas have been qualified as bhakti poets, D.R. Nagaraj notes that Allamaprabhu was not a bhakti poet. Nagaraj explains that Allama's "insistence on opaque and mysterious modes of metaphor is in stark contrast with the emotionally transparent model of bhakti."

=== Social concerns ===
Allamaprabhu used poetry, now part of Vachana Sahitya literature, to criticise rituals and social conventions, to breakdown social barriers and to emphasize moral values and devotional worship of Shiva. The vacanakaras, of which Allama was a prominent spokesman, rejected both the 'great' traditions of Vedic religion and the 'little' local traditions, and questioned and ridiculed "classical belief systems, social customs and superstitions, image worship, the caste system, the Vedic ritual of yajna, as well as local sacrifices of lambs and goats."

During the fifteenth century Virashaiva priests consolidated the Virashaiva lore, overemphasizing the theological and meta-physical aspects, and ignoring the socio-political aspects. The Shoonya Sampadane is a result of this consolidation, which is "a far cry from the socio-political pre-occupations of the twelfth-century movement."

=== Philosophy and religiosity ===
Allamaprabhu propagated the unitary consciousness of Self and Shiva, using poetry to express this unity. The vachanakaras regarded language as a limited means to express "the unitive experience of truth." Yet, the vachanas are seen as an expression of the Divine when, in Allama's words,

All Language is the essence of beyond if one knows oneself. All language is ignorance if one is unaware of oneself.

Allama's poetry and spirituality is "intensely personal and experimental," and the vachanas in general "bear [...] a highly complex relationship to other schools," which makes it very difficult to trace and establish exact influences and independent developments. Nevertheless, Allama's philosophy is described as monism (Note: William McCormack, quoting Ramanujan, states, "Allamaprabhu perhaps taught philosophical monism through his vacanas".) and also as non-dualism ("advaita"). (Note: Allama has been called an exponent of "nondualism", c.q "advaita": Ishawaran: "Allamaprabhu, a staunch exponent of non-dualism (advaita), convinced Siddharama that God was within himself. He chided him by saying, 'you who presume to place Him before you and converse with Him, do not have any understanding of Him!"; The terms "nondualism" and "advaita" should not be confused with Shankara's Advaita Vedanta, which follows the Vedas instead of the Agamas, although Allamaprabhu, and Lingayatism in general, has also been specifically characterized as showing similarities with Shankara's Advaita Vedanta: Surendranath Dasgupta: "It will be easy for us to show that Allama-Prabhu, the teacher of Basava, was thoroughly surcharged with the Vedantism of the Śaṇkara school."; According to S.C. Nandimath, as referred to by A.K. Ramanujan, Lingayatism shows "philosophical similarities with the monism preached by the eighth-century Vedantin, Sankaracharya."; Although Advaita or nondualism nowadays is best-known from Shankara's Advaita Vedanta, it has a long history in Indian thought which is not confined to Advaita Vedanta. Shankara's Advaita was influenced by Madhyamaka Buddhism and its notion of sunyata, while Pre-sectarian Buddhism may also have been responding to the oldest Upanishadic teachings of the Chandogya Upanishad, itself one of the sources of Shankara's teachings. Dasgupta and Mohanta also note that Buddhism and Shankara's Advaita Vedanta are not opposing systems, but "different phases of development of the same non-dualistic metaphysics from the Upanishadic period to the time of Sankara." This development did not end with Advaita Vedanta, but continued in Tantrism and various schools of Shaivism. Non-dual Kashmir Shaivism, for example, was influenced by, and took over doctrines from, several orthodox and heterodox Indian religious and philosophical traditions. These include Vedanta, Samkhya, Patanjali Yoga and Nyayas, and various Buddhist schools, including Yogacara and Madhyamika, but also Tantra and the Nath-tradition. In modern times, due to the influence of Western esotericism, Universalism and Perennialism on Indian Neo-Vedanta and subsequent Hindu nationalism, Advaita Vedanta has acquired a broad acceptance in Indian culture and beyond as the paradigmatic example of Hindu spirituality. Other traditions and religious persons, for example Ramana Maharshi, are also labeled as "advaita," despite the fact that the Shaivite traditions have a different origin, history and textual basis. On the interplay between the various Indian traditions, and the development of the Advaitic hegemony, see: Samuel, Geoffrey (2010), The Origins of Yoga and Tantra. Indic Religions to the Thirteenth Century, Cambridge University Press; Nicholson, Andrew J. (2010), Unifying Hinduism: Philosophy and Identity in Indian Intellectual History, Columbia University Press; King (2002)) He de-emphasized the need to perfect difficult feats of Yoga and emphasized overcoming the boundaries between relative and absolute knowledge, between devotee and guru (teacher). He used his poetry to teach others, voicing a spirituality that is Nirguna (without attributes, qualities), yet uses Saguna devotionalism in order to metaphorically express what is inexpressible:

Without the duality – mind and mere bone,
For him who has merged his own Self with the Lord,
All actions are actions of linga alone.
With mind given rest from its usual toil,
For him who has merged his own Self with the Lord,
All thoughts of attainment his knowledge be spoil.
Himself into Self having joined with great yoke,
For him there's no dual, no unity broke,
O Lord of the Caves!

— Allamaprabhu, Translated by R Blake Michael

== Writings on Allamaprabhu ==
Allamaprabhu was the protagonist of some important writings in the Kannada language. The Vijayanagara poet, Chamarasa, wrote Prabhulingalile (1430) in the court of King Deva Raya II, giving an account of the life and teachings of Allamaprabhu. In this work, Allama is considered an incarnation of the Hindu god Ganapati, and Parvati, the consort of the god Shiva, takes the form of the princess of Banavasi to test his detachment from the material world. So popular was the work, that the king had it translated into Tamil and Telugu languages. Later, translations were made into Sanskrit and Marathi languages.

With the intent of re-kindling the spirit of the 12th century, the Sunyasampadane ("Achievement of nothingness" or "The mystical zero"), a famous anthology of Vachana poems and Veerashaiva philosophy was compiled during the Vijayanagara era. It was compiled in four versions starting with the anthologist Shivaganaprasadi Mahadevaiah in c. 1400. Other versions by Halage Arya (1500), Siddhalingayati (1560) and Siddaveerannodaya (1570) are considered refinements. With Allama as its central figure, these anthologies give a vivid account of his interaction, in the form of dialogues, with contemporary saints and devotees. The quality of the work is considered very high. One of his work was translated in to Tamil by Karpanai Kalangiyam Sivaprakasa Swamigal as "Prabhu Linga Leelai".

== Sources ==
=== Print sources ===
- Dasgupta, Sanghamitra; Mohanta, Dilip Kumar (July 1998), "Some Reflections on the Relation Between Sankara And Buddhism", Indian Philosophical Quarterly, 25 (3): 349–366
- Datta, Amaresh, ed. (1987). Encyclopaedia of Indian literature. Vol. 1, A-devo. Sahitya Akademi. OCLC 34346316.
- Gombrich, R.F. (1990), "Recovering the Buddha's Message", in Ruegg, David Seyfort; Schmithausen, Lambert (eds.), Earliest Buddhism: Madhyamaka, BRILL
- Ishawaran, K. (1992), Speaking of Basava: Lingayat Religion and Culture in South Asia, Westview Press, ISBN 978-0813383897
- King, Richard (2002), Orientalism and Religion: Post-Colonial Theory, India and "The Mystic East", Routledge
- Michael, R. Blake (1992), The Origins of Vīraśaiva Sects: A Typological Analysis of Ritual and Associated Patterns in the Śūnyasaṃpādane, Motilal Banarsidass Publ.
- Muller-Ortega, Paul E. (2010), Triadic Heart of Siva: Kaula Tantricism of Abhinavagupta in the Non-Dual Shaivism of Kashmir, Suny press
- Nagaraj, D.R. (2003) [2003]. "Critical Tensions in the History of Kannada Literary Culture". In Sheldon I. Pollock (ed.). Literary Cultures in History: Reconstructions from South Asia. Berkeley and London: University of California Press. ISBN 0-520-22821-9.
- Ramanujan, A.K. (1973), Speaking of Siva, Penguin Classics, ISBN 0-14-044270-7
- Ramanujan, A.K. (1996). Galit Hasan-Rokem; David Dean Shulman (eds.). Untying the Knot: On Riddles and Other Enigmatic Modes. Oxford University Press. ISBN 978-0195108569.
- Saravanan, V. Hari (2014), Gods, Heroes and their Story Tellers: Intangible cultural heritage of South India, Notion Press
- Sastri, Nilakanta K.A. (1955). A history of South India from prehistoric times to the fall of Vijayanagar. New Delhi: Indian Branch, Oxford University Press (published 2002). ISBN 0-19-560686-8.
- Shipley, Joseph T. (2007). Encyclopedia of Literature - Vol I. READ BOOKS. ISBN 978-1-4067-0135-7.
- Shiva Prakash, H.S. (1997). "Kannada". In Ayyappapanicker (ed.). Medieval Indian Literature:An Anthology. Sahitya Akademi. ISBN 81-260-0365-0.
- Shivaprakash, H.S. (2010), I Keep Vigil of Rudra: The Vachanas, London: Penguin Classics, ISBN 9788184752830
- Subramanian, V.K. (2005). Sacred Songs of India- Vol VI. Abhinav Publications. ISBN 81-7017-419-8.
