= Mantra Gopya =

Mantra Gopya is a Kannada language text written by Lingayat saint and mystic Allama Prabhu. It forms an important part of Lingayat scriptures.
