= Shatsthala =

Shatsthala (ಷಟ್ ಸ್ಥಲ) or six phases/states/paths is pivotal to the Lingayat philosophy. Shatsthala is a conflation of Shat and Sthala which means 'six phases/states/levels' through which a person (a bhakta/seeker) advances in one's ultimate quest of realisation of the Supreme, or, simply put, enlightenment. (The word enlightenment used here refers to the Indian notion of enlightenment.) The Shatsthala comprises the Bhakta Sthala, Maheshwara Sthala, Prasadi Sthala, Pranalingi Sthala, Sharana Sthala and the Aikya Sthala. The Aikya Sthala is the culmination where the soul leaves the physical body and merges with the Supreme.

== Brief Description of the Sthalas ==
A brief description of the six sthala-s, according to the Lingayat tradition.

1. Bhakta: Bhaktasthala involves the worship of Guru, Linga and Jangama . When one understands the true meaning of this Sthala, one conceives the true meaning of the trinity of Guru, Linga and Jangama . Through this Sthala one becomes free from the desires of the body and mind and becomes a Bhakta by virtue of his/her belief in Shiva.
2. Mahesha: Maheshasthala involves the actual practice of the above concept, which enables to lose the desire for material wealth, not coveting and not longing for unrighteous sensual pleasures.
3. Prasadisthala: Prasaadisthala states that all things in this world are gifts of Shiva and whatever human receives as God’s gifts must be returned to him through the intermediacy of the Jangama, who represents Shiva.
4. Pranalingi: Pranalingisthala makes one aware of the inner being. Here the seeker comes to believe that the Linga is the Jangama and all actions are transformed into prayers.
5. Sharanasthala: Sharanasthala endows an individual with the feeling and knowledge of God’s presence in his/her own soul and begins a direct dialogue with Shiva.
6. Aikya: Aikyasthala forms the final stage. A stage of the culmination of the sublime achievement. It is the unitary consciousness of Self and Shiva.

While the origins of the Shatsthala may be traced to the Agamas, particularly the Parameshwaratantra, with the evolution of Lingayatism the evolution of concept of Shatsthala was also unavoidable. While Basava understood Shatsthala as a process with various stages to be attained in succession, the credit of refuting this and redefining Shatsthala goes to Channabasavanna, Basava's nephew. Channabasavanna differed radically from his uncle and held that a soul can reach its salvation in any stage.
