= Salpe (surname) =

Salpe (Kannada:ಸಲ್ಪೇ, Telugu:సల్పే, Tamil:சல்பே, Marathi:साल्पे or सालपे) is the surname of families in India who generally belongs to Veershaiva Lingayat religion settled in Maharastra.

In the 12th century, in Chalukya Kingdom Lingayat people were persecuted for their religious beliefs. To escape genocide after Revolution of Kalyana, they left in numbers to neighbouring states like Maharashtra, Telangana, Andhra Pradesh, Tamil Nadu and Kerala. During the same time Salpe families migrated to Maharashtra, they settled in Salpe village in Satara district which is nearby Salpe Ghat. After that they picked up name of village (Name of village as surname is very common practice in Lingayat religion) as their identity. Their original Kannada name could be difficult to pronounce in Marathi so they pick up name of village as their surname. . They can fluently speak both Kannada and Marathi languages. For last 500 years in Maharashtra, they were in grocery and money lending business.
