= Balligavi =

- town
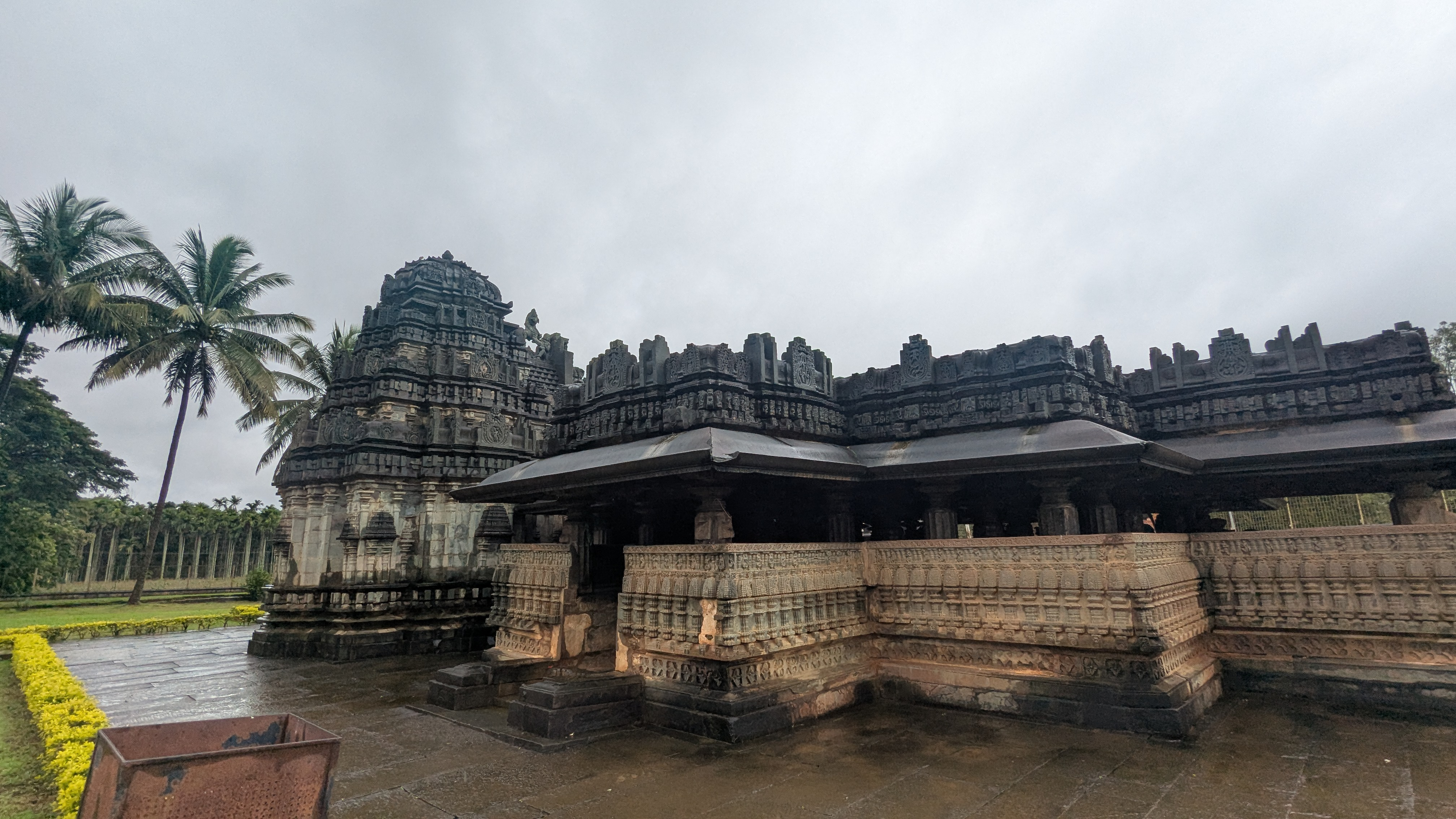
- Kedareshvara temple at Balligavi

- Location in Karnataka, India Balligavi (India)
- Coordinates: 14.3939°N 75.2439°E
- Country: India
- State: Karnataka
- District: Shivamogga District

Languages
  - Official: Kannada
- Time zone: UTC+5:30 (IST)

Balligavi a town in Shikaripura taluk Shivamogga district of Karnataka state, India, is today known as Belagami or Balagame. Its ancient names are Baligrama, Dakshina Kendra, Valliggame and Valligrame. A place of antiquity, it is known for its ancient monuments. Balligavi was an Ancient Jain Hub of South Before the 12th century inscriptional records mention the presence of more than twenty basadis during this period. Balligavi is located 72 km from Shivamogga city and 21 km from Shikaripura town and 2.3 km from Shiralakoppa in Shikaripura taluk. Balli in Kannada means creeper or vine.

Archaeologically, Balligavi dated from the Satavahana-Kadamba era and the Chaturmukha linga (four faced linga) here is in that style. The area came under the Banavasi province of the Kadamba Dynasty in 4-5th century AD. Important Kadamba inscriptions like the Talagunda inscriptions, near Balligavi have been collected by the Archaeological Survey of India.

== Golden age ==
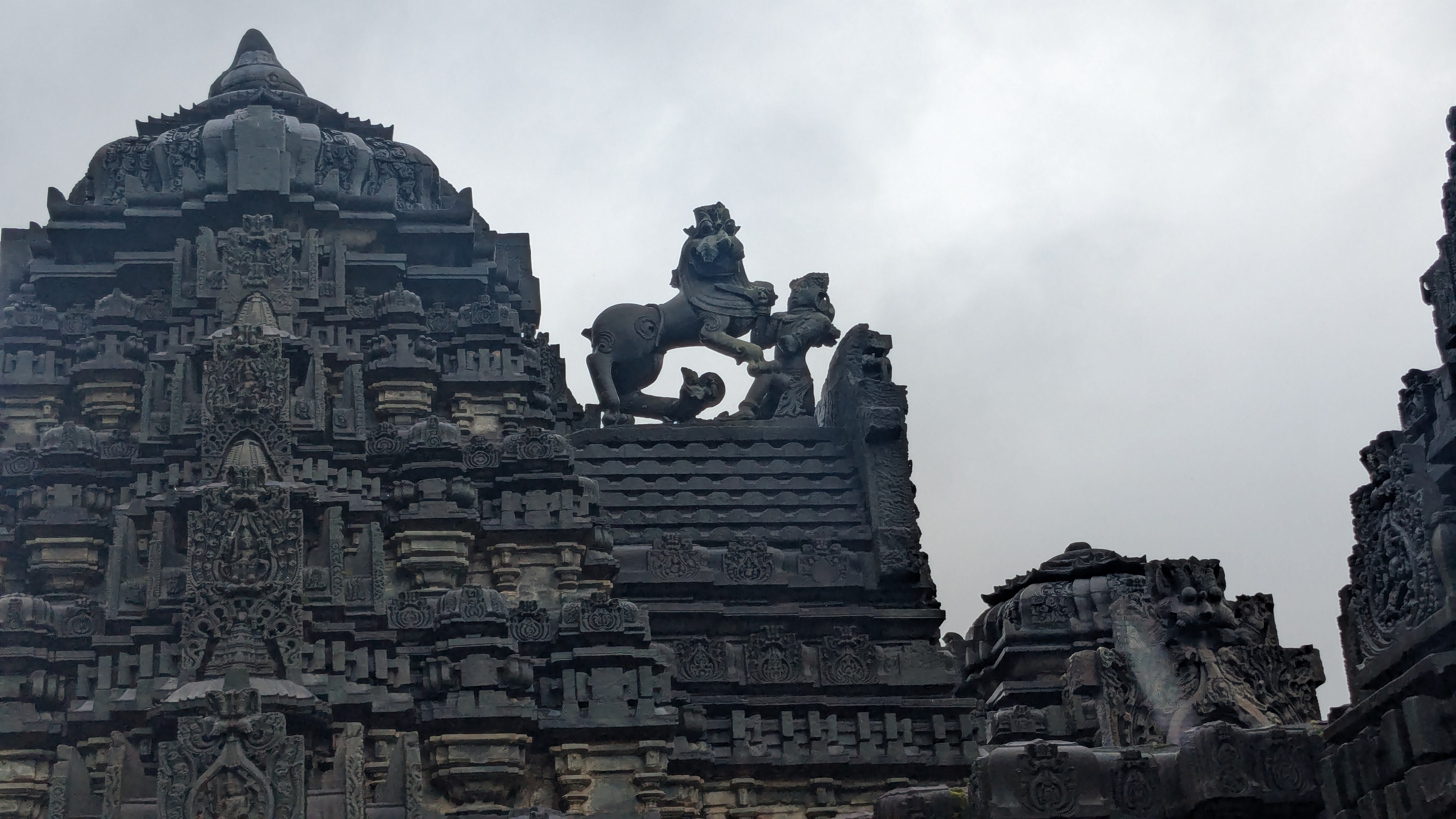
Hoysala architecture, Balligavi

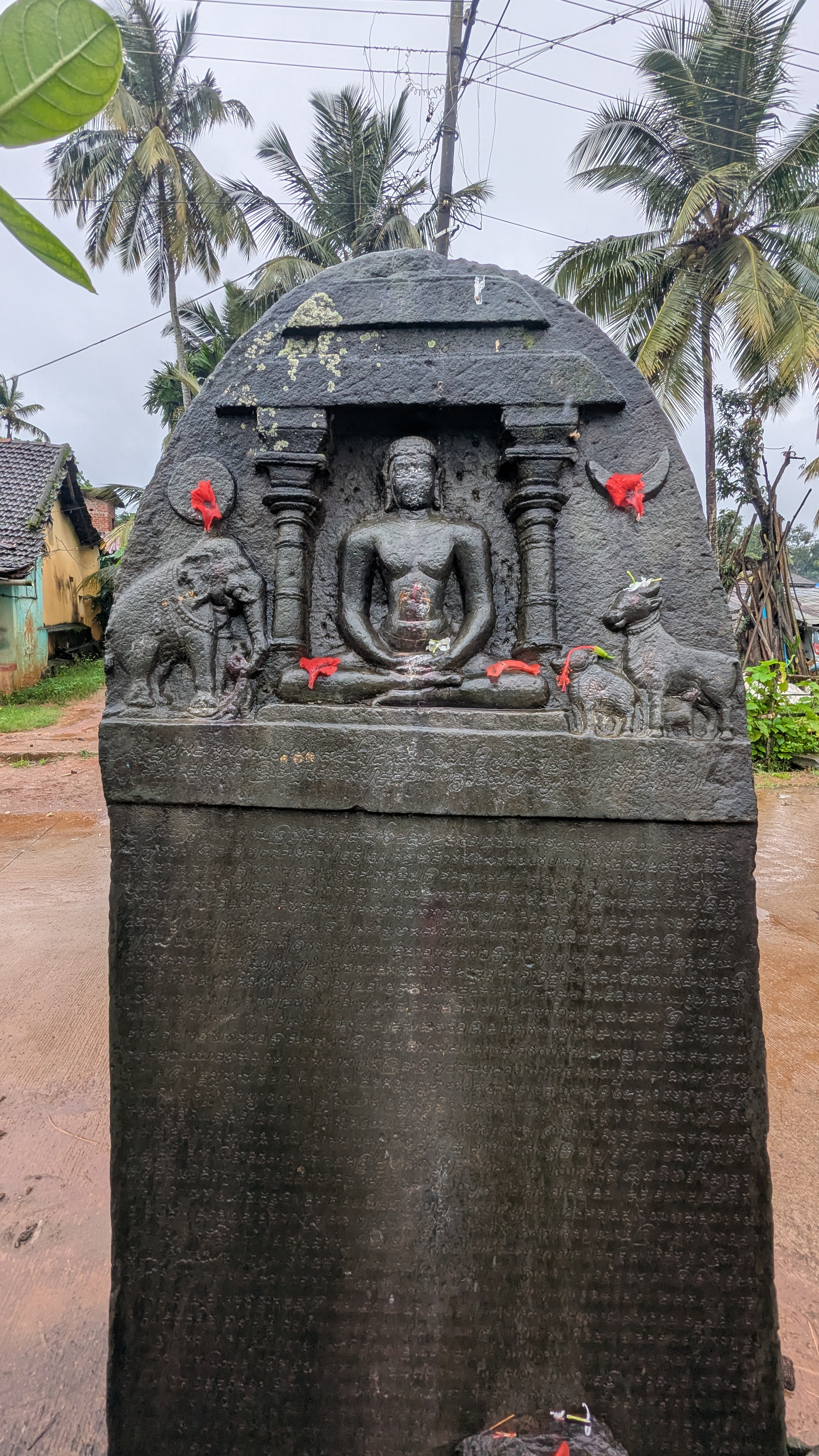
Inscription of Balligavi

The golden age of Balligavi was during the rule of the Western Chalukya Empire during the 10th-12th centuries. The earliest inscription mentioning the name Balligavi is a 685 CE Badami Chalukya inscription. Balligavi during these times had six mathas, three puras "extensions", five vidyapithas "places of learning", and seven Brahmapuris. The mathas belonged to Jains, Shaivas, Vaishnavas, and Buddhists. The Kedareshwara matha belonging to the Kalamukha Shaivas and the Kodiya matha was well known and had the patronage of the Hoysala emperors, marking the place as one of religious activity. Records also indicate that an ancient University existed here. The town also had 54 temples and supported 60,000 residents during that time. Several inscriptions reveal that it was very prominent and stronghold capital of the Vira Bananju warrior merchant community, i.e. modern day Banajigara or Banajiga or Balija community.

Today, Balligavi is a quiet town much of whose daily routines revolve around agriculture and the famous 11th century Kedaresvara Temple and Tripurantakesvara Temple.

== Legend ==
Legend has it that Balligavi was the capital of an Asura king (demon) and hence was called Balipura (city of Bali). The Pandavas came here while on their Vanavasa (forest sojourn) and installed the Panchalinga (five lingas); hence the name Panchalingeswara to the well known temple here. Linga is the universal symbol of Shiva.

== Personalities ==
Balligavi is also the birthplace of the Famous Hoysala Queen Shantala Devi and Virashaiva saint Allama Prabhu and is closely associated with Vachana poet Akka Mahadevi who was born in nearby Udugani (also known as Udutadi). She was a contemporary of Allama Prabhu and Basavanna, the founder of the Virashaiva movement. Many famous Hoysala sculptors like Dasoja, Malloja, Nadoja, Siddoja hailed from here.

== Kedaresvara Temple ==
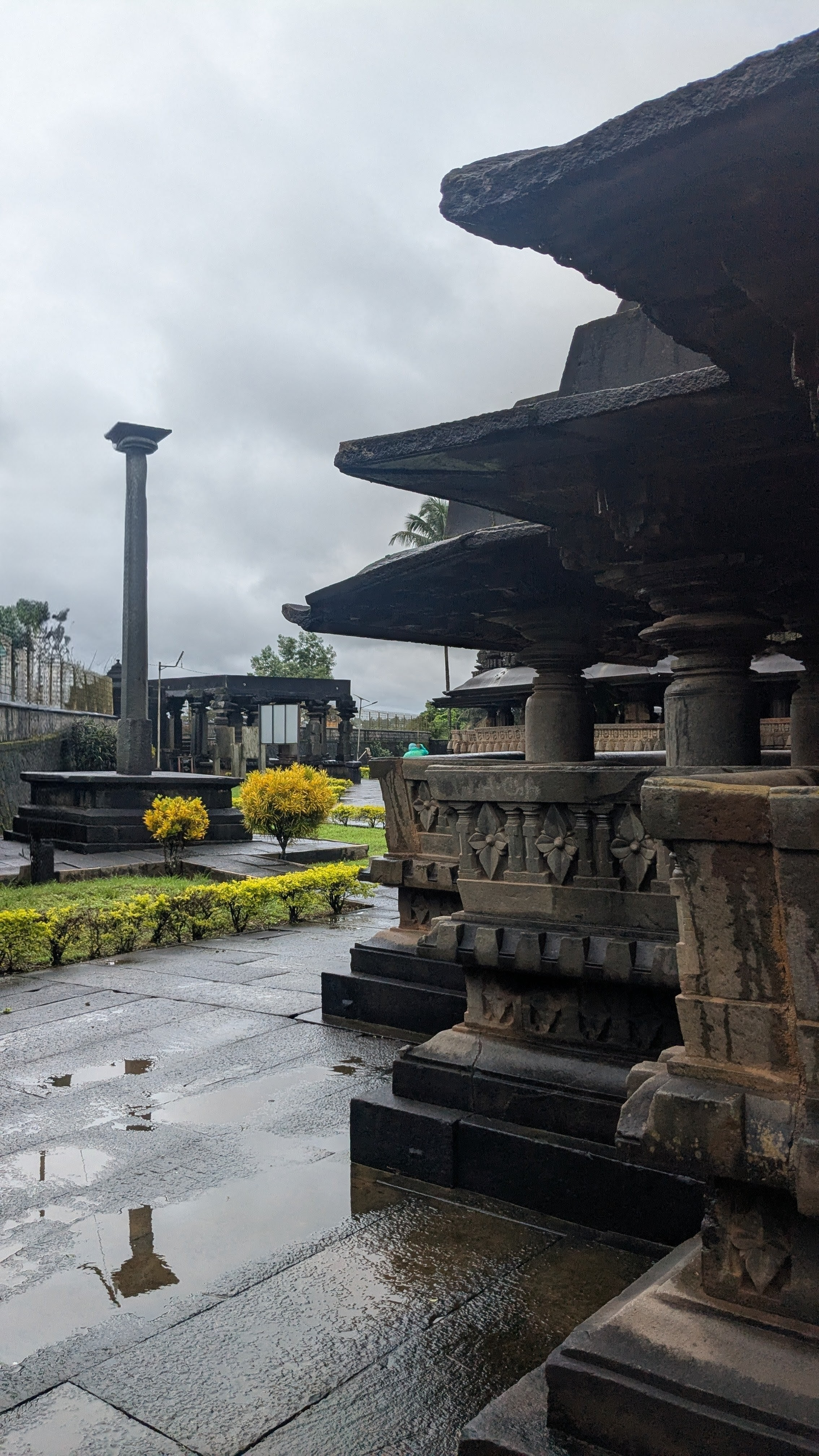
Architecture of Hoysala kingdom

This is an excellent example of a trikuta "triple towers" temple in a transitional Western Chalukya-Hoysala architecture. It is the oldest example of such a combinational style in Karnataka according to reports from the Mysore archaeological department. The temple faces east and has a stepped entrance on three sides. The entrance on the sides is a Western Chalukya idiom. The central shrine has a linga (universal symbol of Shiva) made from black marble (Krishnashila). The shrine to the south has a linga called Brahma and the shrine to the north has a statue of Janardhana (Vishnu). The temple's outside plan is in "staggered-square" style with many projections and recesses which is a Hoysala design. The outer walls of the open mandapa (hall) have carvings of women wearing fine jewellery. Two Hoysala emblems were added in 1060 CE by Vinayaditya. The superstructure (tower) of the vimana are very well decorated with sculptures of Tandaveshwara, Varaha, Uma Narasimha, Bhairava etc. (avatars of Shiva and Vishnu) and the sukanasi of all three towers still exist. The western shrine is the oldest dating from the 7th or 8th century. Attached to the vestibule that connects the shrines is a well designed open mantapa with two rows of pillars. The outer row of pillars are 16 faced while the inner row of pillars are lathe turned with bell shaped mouldings, a style popular with both Western Chalukys and Hoysalas. The ceiling of the mantapa is flat and the inner ceiling is well carved with lotuses in them. The central ceiling has the carving of Tandaveshwara (dancing Shiva) with eight dikpalakas (guards). The entrance to the shrine which faces east has a Nandi, the bull and a celestial attendant of Shiva.

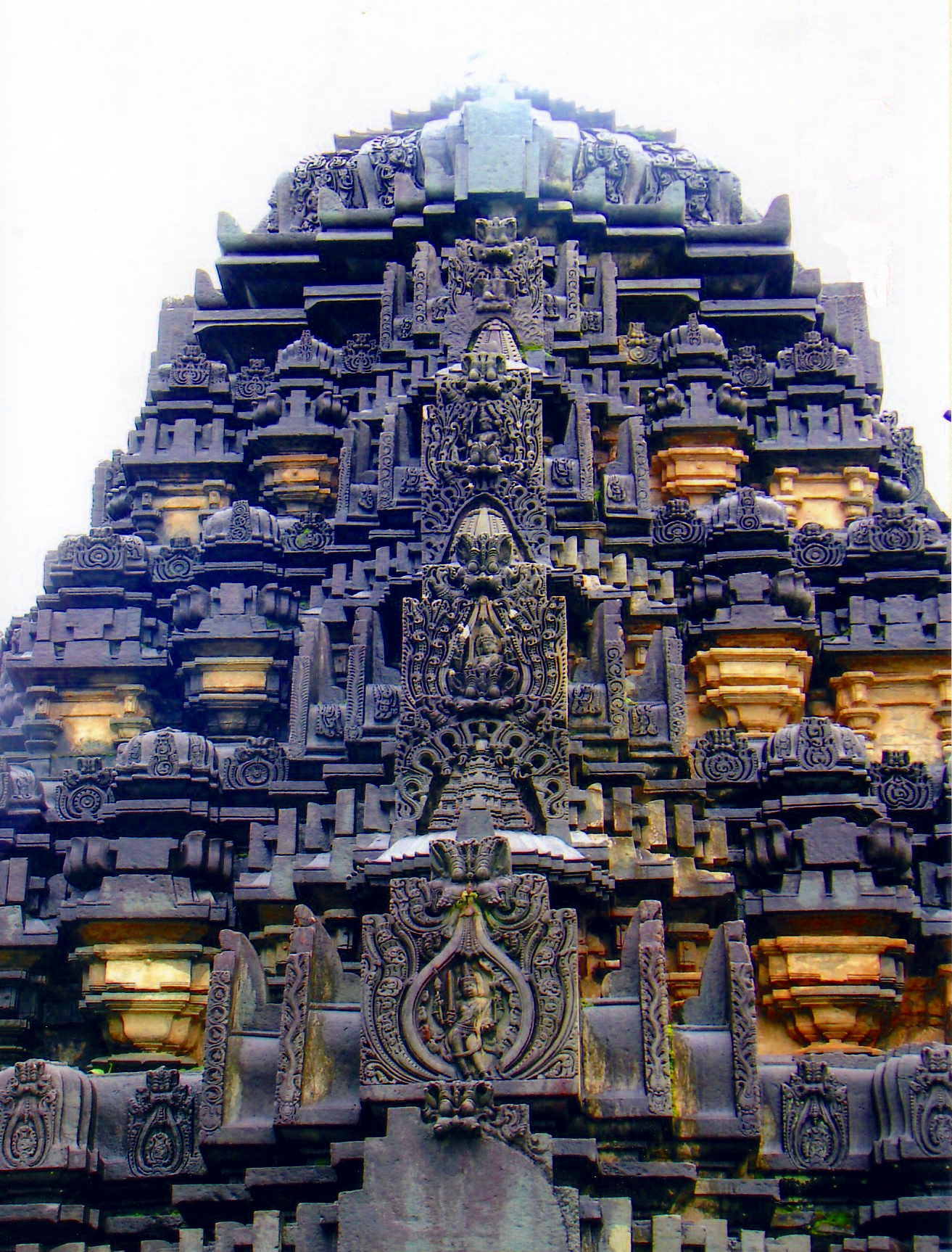
Vimana with Kirtimukha (demon face), Kedaresvara temple, Balligavi

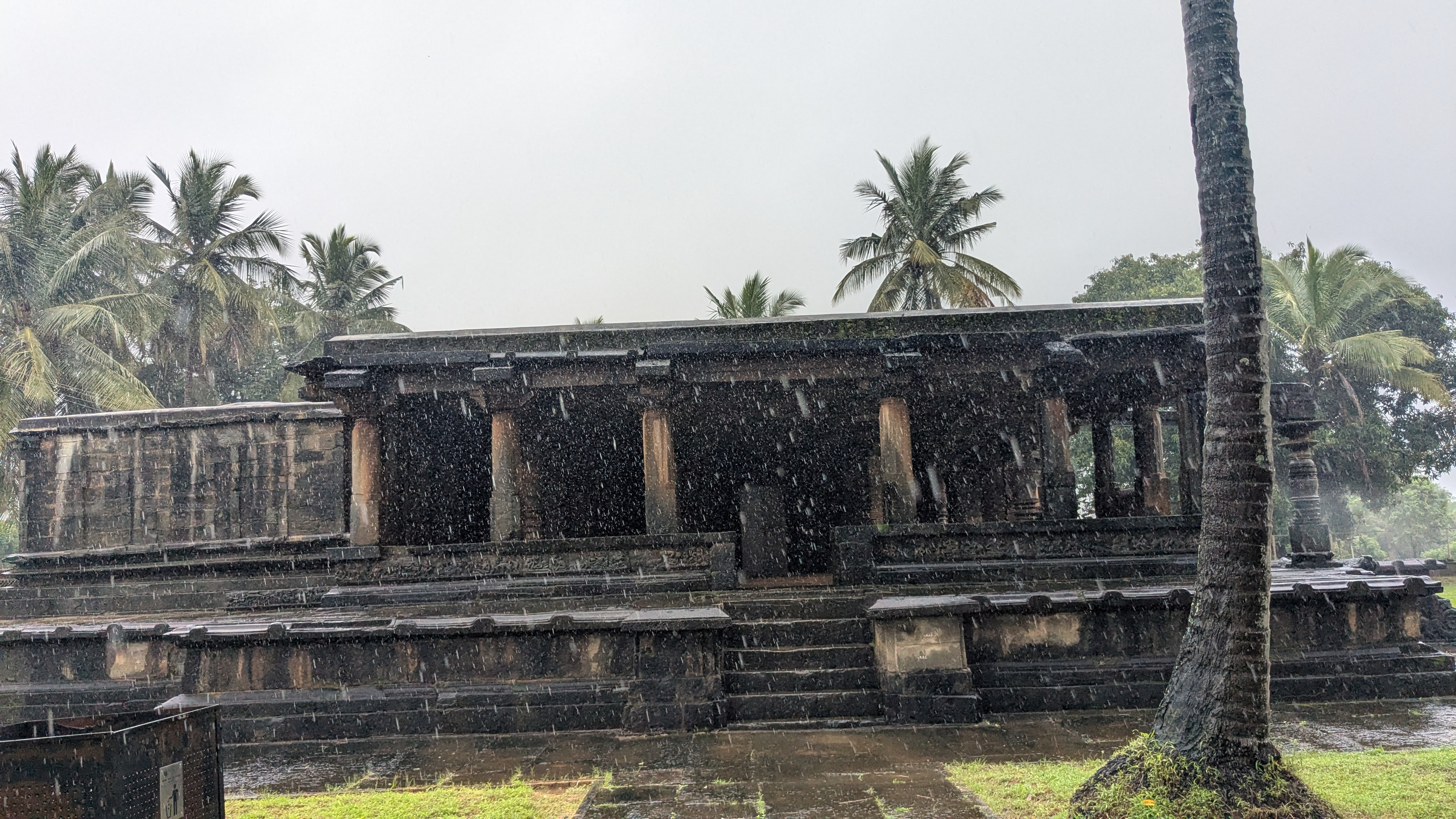
Temples of Balligavi

== Tripurantaka Temple ==
The 'Tripurantaka Temple (also called Tripurantakesvara or Tripurantakeshwara) was built around c. 1070 CE by the Western Chalukyas. This temple, which is in a dilapidated state, is in the historically important town of Balligavi (also called Balagamve), modern Shivamogga district, Karnataka state, India. The exterior walls of the temple have erotic sculptures on friezes. These depictions are considered rare in Chalukyan art. Being miniature in size, these are visible only upon close examination. During medieval times, Balligavi was a seat of learning to multiple religious faiths and was home to many monuments and structures built by the Chalukyas. More than 80 medieval inscriptions have been discovered in Balligavi and belong to the Jain, Shaiva, Vaishnava and Buddhist traditions. These inscriptions describe, among other things, the building of temples.
