= Basava Puranam =

The Basava Puranam is a 13th-century Telugu epic poem written by Palkuriki Somanatha. It is a sacred text of the Veerashaiva tradition. The epic poem narrates the life story of philosopher and social reformer Basavanna (1134–1196 CE), also known as Basavaṇṇa, Basavēśvara, Basavēśa, and Basavarāja, the founder of Shiva-Sharana. It is also an anthology of several Veerashaiva saints (also known as Shiva Sharan's, Surrendered devotees of Lord Shiva) and their philosophies.

In contrast to champu style (poems in verse of various metres interspersed with paragraphs of prose), Somanatha adopted the desi (native) style and composed the purana in dvipada (couplets), a meter popular in oral tradition and closely related to folk music.

In 1369, the Basava Puranam was translated to Kannada by Bhima Kavi. This version contains detailed descriptions of the life of Basava and came to be considered his standard biography. There are several Kannada and Sanskrit Lingayat puranas inspired by Bhima Kavi's Basava Puranam.

This Telugu puranam was first translated into English by C.P. Brown, a British administrator in colonial south India, in 1863.

== Translations ==
- Siva's Warriors: The Basava Purana of Palkuriki Somanatha, Tr. by Velcheru Narayana Rao. Princeton Univ Press, 1990. ISBN 0691055912.

== See also ==
- Vachana sahitya
- Jangam
