= Channabasavanna =

One of the foremost Shivasharans

Channabasavanna also known as " Guru Channabasaveshwara " was Basava's nephew and one of the foremost Sharanas of the 12th century. He, along with Basava, Allama Prabhu and Akka Mahadevi, played a pivotal role in the propagation of the Lingayat faith. He was the youngest among the sharana leaders and grew up in the household of Basavanna as he was the son of Nagalambike, Basava's own sister. He also wrote the Karana Hasuge which is one of the most sacred texts of the Lingayats, among many vachanas. He propounded the "shatasthala" philosophy associated with the six holy places of Veerashaiva Lingayat creed. He succeeded to the Shunya Simhasana at Anubhava Mantapa, Kalyana after the departure of Allama Prabhu, circa 1162ad. His young shoulders carried on the legacy of Basava after the latter's departure to Kudalasangama in 1162ad. He is credited to have systematised the entire manual of simple rituals for the followers. He was a strong advocate of the Ishtalinga wearing and expounded the material as well as the esoteric meaning of that divine symbol. He held together the nascent group of Shivasharanas and Jangmas in tumultuous times of clashes with the orthodox Brahmins and heretic Jains. Following the assassination of Kalachuri King Bijjala II in 1167 A.D, Channabasava along with his followers migrated to Ulavi safeguarding the Vachana literature. He attained Samadhi state there at the age of 25 passing on the leadership of the movement to Siddarama.

A sacred temple of Channabasavanna is located at Ulavi in Karwar District (Uttar Kannada) of Karnataka State, India.

The temple of Channabasavanna faces the east. There is a spacious lotus lake in front of the temple. Devotees coming from different parts of the country, take a dip in the holy waters, which is traditionally believed to cleanse sins and impurities. Mahasamadhi of Channabasavanna is worshipped with all pomp and ceremony thrice a day. On the Samadhi is placed the face of Nandi. To the left is Sangameshwar, to the right Mallikarjuna and to the right of Mallikarjuna is Basavanna. The temple also features a Mantap outside the temple. To the east and to the south there are doors. The door of the sanctum is to the east.

He composed many Vachanas under the pen name Kudala Channasangama.

== Sources ==
- History of Shavism
