= Hoogar =

Hoogar, also spelled Hugar, is an endogamous community of Lingayat people living in Karnataka, in southwest India. The traditional profession of the Hoogars was growing gathering and selling flowers. Hoogar means "those who sell flowers" or "a person who makes flower garlands" in the Kannada language.

The 1961 Census of India described the Hoogar as "the traditional Lingayat flower supplier." Lingayatism is a non-Vedic monotheistic religion that rejects the traditional caste system.

They form a tiny fraction of the population of Karnataka, have been abandoning their traditional profession and have taken up modern education. By 1961, "these occupational distinctions and limitations have practically disappeared" among the followers of Lingayatism.
