= Mandarke Madhav Pai =

Indian linguist (1930–2021)

- Born: 21 December 1930; Karkala, Dakshin Kannada, Karnataka, British India
- Died: 16 November 2021 (aged 90); Shimoga, India
- Occupations: Konkani littérateur and grammar specialist

Mandarke Madhav Pai (21 December 1930 – 16 November 2021) was an Indian Kannada, Sanskrit and Konkani linguist.

== Early life ==
Mandarke Madhav Pai was born on 21 December 1930 in Karkala, Dakshina Kannada district. He was the second son of M. Narayan Pai and Lakshmibai. He completed his primary education in Karkala Board Main School & S V Higher Elementary School.

== Career ==
Pai wrote a Kannada-Konkani dictionary, which was published in both Kannada and Devanagari scripts and took five years to complete.

Pai also completed a Konkani translation of the vasavanas written by Basavanna, and wrote a regular linguistics column in the Konkani publication Kodial Khabar.

His contribution in the field of Konkani translation, has been hailed as ‘Konkani Shabda Ratnakara’ (which translates to Ocean of Konkani Words). He has not only collected Konkani riddles and folklore, but also has contributed with the 750-page ‘Kannada-Konkani Dictionary.’

== Death ==
Pai died in Shimoga on 16 November 2021, at the age of 90.

== Awards and recognitions ==
Pai was honored with the Basti Vaman Shenoy Seva Puraskar award at the 2014 Vimala Pai Vishwa Konkani Awards, in recognition of his "contribution to Konkani language and literature and translation".

On 22 October 2014 Mandharke Madhava Pai was awarded with the Seva puraskar for his contribution to Konkani language, old Kannada Vachana Sahithya and Konkani translation.

One of the biggest contributions to the Konkani literature was by writing Kannada - Konkani dictionary. Kannada writer Padma M Shenoy released The Kannada - Konkani dictionary written by Kannada, Sanskrit and Konkani linguist M Madhava Pai at a glittering function held at Vishwa Konkani Centre, Mangalore on Sunday 12 June.
