= Phakirappa Gurubasappa Halakatti =

Indian scholar and writer

- Born: 2 July 1880; Dharwad, Bombay Presidency, British India
- Died: 29 June 1964 (aged 83); Karnataka
- Education: University of Bombay
- Occupations: Lawyer, writer, social worker
- Writing career
- Pen name: Pha Gu Halakatti
- Subject: Vachanas
- Notable works: Shivaanubhava, Nava Karnataka
- Notable awards: honorary doctorate

Dr. Phakirappa Gurubasappa Halakatti was an Indian scholar and Kannada writer and also known for the resurrection of Vachana sahitya. Phakeerappa Halakatti was born on July 2, 1880, to Gurubasappa and Danamma in Dharwad. He was the founding father of BLDEA an educational trust in Bijapur.

== Early life and education ==
He completed his primary and middle school education in Dharwad. In 1902, Halakatti obtained his graduation in BA from St. Xavier's College, Mumbai and continued his studies and completed LLB degree in first class in 1904.

== Early career ==
In 1904 he arrived in Bijapur to pursue the career as a lawyer. While pursuing his career as a lawyer, he dedicated himself to the collection of Vachana literature by moving house to house. He made people realize the importance of Vachana sahitya written by Basavanna and other Sharanas.

== Collection of Vachanas ==
Halakatti came across few bundles of Vachanas written in the palm leaf when he visited Sri Shivalingappa Manchale. There he had the opportunity to see palm leaf manuscripts of 'Shatsthala Thilaka' and 'Prabhudeva Vachana' and he was deeply influenced by them and dedicated his life to the revival of Vachana sahitya. He started 'Hithachinthaka (ಹಿತಚಿಂತಕ)' printing press to publish the collected manuscripts. In order to promote Vachana sahitya he started 'Shivanubhava (ಶಿವಾನುಭವ)' Kannada newspaper and ‘Shivanubhava Granthamale (ಶಿವಾನುಭವ ಗ್ರಂಥಮಾಲೆ)’. In 1927, Dr. P. G. Halakatti started a weekly called 'Navakarnataka (ನವಕರ್ನಾಟಕ)' which published political, social, educational and employment related articles.

== Awards and recognitions ==
Recognizing Sri Halakatti’s service to literature, Karnatak University conferred on him Doctor of Literature degree in November 1953.

Dr. P. G. Halakatti was chosen as the president of Kannada Sahitya Sammelana (Kannada literature conference) held in 1926 in Ballary.

== Literary contributions ==
- Sri Basaveshvarana Vachanagalu, (1926)
- Mahadeviayakkana Vachanagalu, (1927)
- Prabhudevara Vachanagalu, (1931)
- Devara Dasimayyana Vachanagalu, (1939)
- Sakalesha Madarasana Vachanagalu, (1929)
- Shunya Sampadane (Guluru Siddaveeranacharya), (1930)
- Siddarameshvarana Vachanagalu, (1932)
- Hariharana Ragalegalu, Part 1 to Part 4, (1933)
- Hariharana Ragalegalu, Part 5 to Part 7, (1935–40)
- Adayyana Vachanagalu, (1930)
