= Shunyasampadane =

Anthology of poems in the Kannada language

Shunyasampadane (Kannada: ಶೂನ್ಯಸಂಪಾದನೆ Śūnyasampādane) is an anthology of poems in the Kannada language that includes the vachanas and dialogues of several Lingayat saints. It is an important part of the holy scriptures of Lingayatism. The word shunyasampadane can be roughly translated as "the acquisition of nothing" in which shunya translates to "nothingness", "void" or "empty". The more precise translation is 'the Graduated Attainment of the Divine Void'. It is part of the important concepts associated with enlightenment in the Indian traditions.

A record of the dialogues of various saints, the Shunyasampadane is a collection of vachanas of the important poets of the 12th century. The story follows the life and times of the holy mystic Allama Prabhu along his way to Kalyana city to meet Basava and the other Shivasharanas. The editors have woven the narrative through the vachanas into a cohesive story. There are a total of five versions of the Shunyasampadane, of which the first four were composed between 15th and 16th century. The fourth version was edited and printed by P. G. Halakatti in 1930. The last version was edited and printed by Dr. GV Jaya Rajashekhar in 2003.

== Editions ==
It is accepted today that there are a total of five Shunyasampadane works. Mahadevayya was the first one to compose a Shunyasampadane in early 15th century. He collated the vachanas of some of the major vachana composers as a series of dramatic narratives. Subsequently, others revised and re-presented his work. In early-16th century, Haligeya Deva, or his student Kenchavirannodeyaru, compiled the second version, adding a new section on Siddharama’s initiation at the hands of Chennabasava. A third version was produced around later by Gummalapurada Siddhalingayati, who mainly added more vachanas to each of the sections, as well as adding new episodes to the debates. The fourth version of the Shunyasampadane was edited by Goolur Siddhaveera. The Fifth and the latest version of Shunyasampadane was edited by Dr.GV Jaya Rajashekhar. All five versions follow a basic pattern, but make recognisable changes in interpretations both in terms of selection of the vachanas and composition of incidents.

Sl. No.	Composer	Date	Information
1.	Shivaganaprasadi Mahadevayya	late-14 / early-15th c	Comprises 1012 vacanas
2.	Halageyadeva	1530	Comprises 1599 vacanas
3.	Gummalapurada Siddalinga		Comprises 1439 vacanas
4.	Guluru Siddaviranna or Guluru Siddaveereshvara	16th c	Comprises 1543 vacanas
5.	Dr. GV Jaya Rajashekhar	2003	Comprises 780 vacanas

== 20th-century editions ==
- Halakatti, P.G., ed. 1930. Guluru Siddavirana Shoonyasampadane.
- Basavaraju, L, ed. 1969. Shivaganaprasadi Mahadevayyana Prabhudevara Shoonyasampadane. Chitradurga: Shri Brahanmatha Samsthana.
- Vidyashankar, S., and G.S. Siddalingaiah, eds. 1998. Halageyaryana Shoonaysampadane. Bangalore: Priyadarshini Prakashana.
- Nandimath, S.C., L.M.A. Menezes, and R.C. Hiremath, eds. 1965. [Gūḷūra Siddhavīrēśvara’s] Śūnyasaṃpādane: Volume I to V. Dharawar: Karnatak University. (It contains the original text and its English translation)
- Jaya Rajashekhar, G.V., eds. 2003. Prabhudevara Shoonyasampadane. Bangalore: Siri Prakashana.
