= David Lorenzen =

British–American historian, religion scholar, and professor

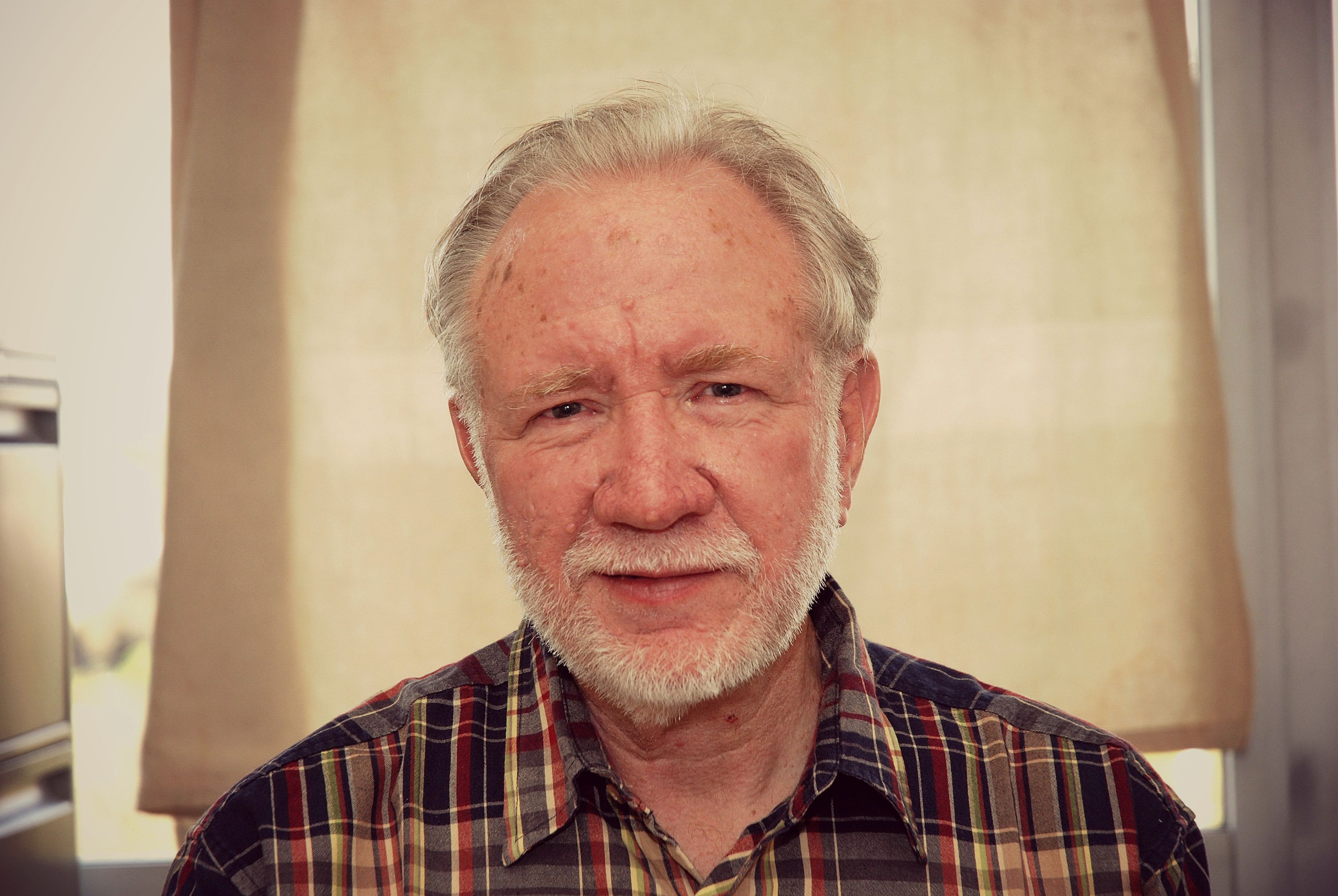
David Lorenzen

David Neal Lorenzen is a British-American historian, scholar of Religious studies, essayist, and emeritus professor of South Asian history at the Centre for Asian and African studies, El Colegio de México in Mexico City.

He is chiefly notable for publishing several essays and books on ancient, medieval, and modern periods in South Asian history and Indian religions, especially on the history of Hinduism and Christian missions in India, including, Who invented Hinduism?, Bhakti Religion in North India, The Scourge Of The Mission: Marco della Tomba in Hindustan.

== Education ==
David N. Lorenzen received his doctorate in the History of Indian Religions from the Australian National University in Canberra (1968), where he studied under the Indologist and historian Arthur Llewellyn Basham. Before that he travelled to India on a Junior Fellowship from the American Institute of Indian Studies (1965–1966), studied ancient Indian history at the School of Oriental and African Studies of the University of London (1962–1965), and did his undergraduate studies at Wesleyan University in Middletown, Connecticut.

== Academic career ==
Lorenzen worked as a professor and researcher for the Center for Asian and African Studies at El Colegio de México in Mexico City from 1970 to 2010. Since 2011 he has been professor of the Interdisciplinary Studies Program at the same institution. He served as editor of the Asia and Africa Studies Journal de from 1987 to 1991 and has been a member of the editorial committee since 1970.

Lorenzen has been visiting professor at the University of Iowa in Iowa City, Harvard University in Cambridge, Massachusetts, the École pratique des hautes études in Paris, and Università "La Sapienza" in Rome. He has presented papers at many academic conferences in various countries. Since 1984 he has been a member and then emeritus member of the National System of Researchers of the Mexican government. He has received research grants from the American Institute of Indian Studies, the Social Science Research Council, and the Indian government.

Since 2019 he has been an emeritus professor at El Colegio de México in Mexico City. Lorenzen has edited and reviewed essays published on notable journals and books.

== Research and publications ==
The academic research of David Lorenzen has concentrated mainly on the history of Hinduism and Christian religious movements in India, but he has also worked on aspects of Indian political history and literature. He has published translations into both Spanish and English of texts written in Hindi and Sanskrit. The topics of his publications include bhakti religious movements, Kabir and his followers, subsects of the Shaivite tradition of Hinduism (including the Naths, Kapalikas, and Kalamukhas), and Capuchin missionaries in the Indian subcontinent. He has also written about the life and thought of the Indian philosopher and Hindu mystic Adi Shankara, the history of the Gupta Empire, and the historical development and conceptualization of Hinduism in pre-colonial and colonial India.

- The Kāpālikas and Kālāmukhas: two lost Śaivite sects (1972)
- Kabir legends and Ananta-das's Kabir Parachai (1991)
- Praises to a formless god: Nirguṇī texts from North India (1996)
- Who invented Hinduism: essays on religion in History (2006)
- The Scourge Of The Mission: Marco della Tomba in Hindustan (2010)
- A Dialogue Between a Christian and a Hindu About Religion by Giuseppe Maria da Gargnano (2015)
- Religious Movements in South Asia 600-1800
- Bhakti Religion in North India: Community Identity and Political Action
- Yogi Heroes and Poets: Histories and Legends of the Naths
- Religious change and cultural domination: XXX International Congress of Human Sciences in Asia and North Africa
- Studies on Asia and Africa from Latin America
- Nirgun Santon Ke Swapana
- Atadura y liberación (Estudios De Asia Y Africa) (Spanish Edition)
- Myths of the Dog-Man. (book reviews): An article from: The Journal of the American Oriental Society
- History and Historiography of the Age of Harsha. (book reviews): An article from: The Journal of the American Oriental Society
- Historical Dictionary of Sikhism.(Review): An article from: The Journal of the American Oriental Society
- A Catalog Of Manuscripts In The Kabir Chaura Monastery, Expanded Edition
- Hindu Theodicy and Jana Gopala (Kervan – International Journal of Afro-Asiatic Studies) (2020)
- Kabir and the Avatars (Kervan – International Journal of Afro-Asiatic Studies) (2021)
- Hindúes, misioneros y orientalistas: una antología (2022)
