= Karana Hasuge =

Karana Hasuge by Channabasavanna is one of the most important works in the Kannada language with regard to the Lingayat faith. Channabasavanna was a contemporary of Basavanna, the founder of Lingayat faith.
