= Kalamukha =

Medieval-era Shaivite sect in the Deccan Plateau

The Kalamukha were a medieval Shaivite sect of the Deccan Plateau who were among the first professional monks of India. Their earliest monasteries were built in Mysore.

== Origin and etymology ==
Information regarding the Kalamukha sect takes the form of inscriptions relating to temple grants and texts usually written by their opponents. They appear to have been an offshoot of the Pashupata sect, about whom more is known. Their name was derived from kālāmukha which has multiple meanings namely, 'facing the time' or 'facing the death' or 'black-face'. Their rituals using "yantras" were more of time based so, we can safely assume the meaning would be one of the first two rather than last one. Evidence from the Puranas and similar ancient texts makes it clear that they were also known by other names, such as Laguda, Lakula and Nakula, and associated with other words meaning black-faced, such as Kalanana.

The rise of the Kalamukhas to a position of influence coincided with the popularisation of the agama texts of Shaivism, and they are shown in the Tirumandiram as one of the six schools of thought to emerge from the agamas. (Note: The dating of the Tirumandiram is controversial because little is known of the life of Tirumular, who is purported to have written it.) Theirs was not, however, a school based purely on the agamas as they also took heed of the orthodox Śruti and were well-versed in the Vaisheshika and Nyaya schools. The Kalamukhas were themselves subdivided, with at least two divisions, called the Saktiparisad and the Simhaparisad. The former of these were found over a wide-ranging area and the latter were mostly concentrated around the districts of Dharwar and Shimoga.

== History ==
According to Ramendra Nath Nandi, the first known record of the Kalamukha sect is a grant issued by the Rashtrakuta dynasty in 807 CE, although he also refers to the existence of a Kalamukha monastery in Mysore in the 8th century. Among the references are a Kalamukha temple recorded in Srinivaspur in 870, another with a college at Chitradurga in 947, and a monastery and temple at Nanjangud by 977. Their major centre was at Balligavi and other temple sites included one at Vijayawada. There is a gap in the recorded evidence of them for around two centuries, after which they are well documented until the Vijayanagara era.

Ramanuja, a Vaishnavite acharya, may have confused the Kalamukha with the Kapalikas in his Sri Bhasya work, in which he noted them as eating from a skull and keeping wine. Such practices were common for the Kapalikas but are atypical for the Kalamukhas. His writings may have been coloured by his experienced of being a member of a different school and being forced by the Kalamukhas and other Shavites to leave his native Tamil Nadu. There was also possibly a desire to discredit because of an element of fear or jealousy driven by the then rising popularity of the Kalamukhas. Nandi notes that:

the Kalamukhas were a saivite sect of social and religious reformers with a strong social basis, whereas the Kapalikas were a sect of self-seekers practising queer and gruesome rites at the cremation ground, away from human localities.

Nonetheless, for many years scholars such as R. G. Bhandarkar believed the Kalamukhas to be a more extreme sect than the Kapalikas, despite acknowledging that Ramanuja's written accounta were confused. David Lorenzen believes this error lay in placing emphasis on Ramanuja's skewed written record above that placed on such epigraphical evidence from inscriptions as had been collated by the time Bhandarkar and others analysed the situation.
