= Panchachara =

Panchacharas in Lingayatism denote the five codes of conduct to be followed by the devotee. The Panchacharas include

- Sivāchāra – acknowledging Shiva as the supreme divine being and upholding the equality and well-being of all human beings.
- Lingāchāra – Daily worship of the individual Ishtalinga icon, one to three times day.
- Sadāchāra – Attention to vocation and duty, and adherence to the seven rules of conduct issued by Basavanna:
  - Kala beda (Do not steal)
  - Kola beda (Do not kill or hurt)
  - Husiya nudiyalu beda (Do not utter lies)
  - Thanna bannisabeda (Do not praise yourself, i.e. practice humility)
  - Idira haliyalu beda (Do not criticize others)
  - Muniya beda (Shun anger)
  - Anyarige asahya padabeda (Do not be intolerant towards others)
- Bhrityāchāra – Compassion towards all creatures.
- Ganāchāra – Defence of the community and its tenets.
