= Vachana sahitya =

Form of rhythmic writing in Kannada

Vachana sahitya is a form of rhythmic writing in Kannada (see also Kannada poetry) that evolved in the 11th century and flourished in the 12th century, as a part of the Sharana movement. The word "vachanas" literally means "(that which is) said". These are readily intelligible prose texts. These writings are notable for their simplicity and directness, often addressing social issues and personal devotion. They were composed in Kannada by saints of the Lingayat faith, most notably Basavanna, Akka Mahadevi, and Allama Prabhu. Vachanas critique rituals and caste discrimination, advocating a form of worship centered on Shiva, envisioned as a universal god.

== Vachanas and Sharana movement ==
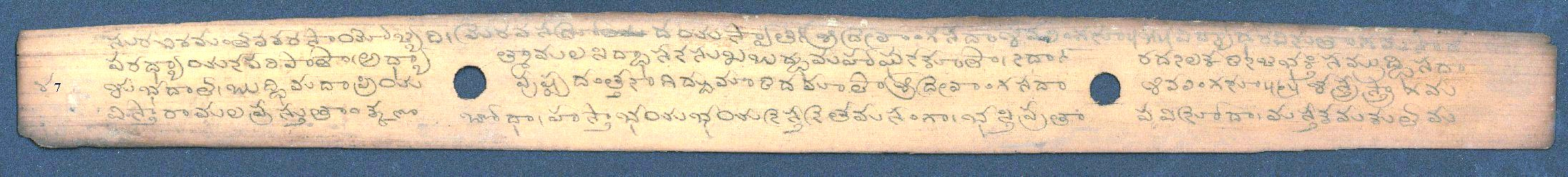
Palm leaf with Vachanas (11th - 12th century).

More than 200 Vachana writers (Vachanakaras also known as Sharanas) have been recorded and more than thirty of whom were women. This movement was notable for its emphasis on personal spiritual experiences and social reform. The Vachanas are characterized by their straightforward language and direct expression of spiritual ideas, making complex philosophical concepts accessible to the common people. This was a significant departure from the Sanskrit-dominated literary scene of the time, which was largely inaccessible to the general populace.

== Vachanas ==
Kannada:
ಉಳ್ಳವರು ಶಿವಾಲಯ ಮಾಡುವರು ನಾನೇನು ಮಾಡಲಿ ಬಡವನಯ್ಯಾ
ಎನ್ನ ಕಾಲೇ ಕಂಬ, ದೇಹವೇ ದೇಗುಲ, ಶಿರವೇ ಹೊನ್ನ ಕಳಸವಯ್ಯಾ
ಕೂಡಲಸಂಗಮದೇವಾ ಕೇಳಯ್ಯಾ, ಸ್ಥಾವರಕ್ಕಳಿವುಂಟು ಜಂಗಮಕ್ಕಳಿವಿಲ್ಲ,

uḷḷavaru shivālaya māḍuvaru nānēnu māḍali baḍavanayyā
enna kālē kamba dēhavē dēgula shiravē honna kaḷasavayyā
kūḍalasangamadēvā kēḷayyā sthāvarakkaḷivunṭu jangamakkaḷivilla

The rich will make temples for Shiva.
What shall I, a poor man, do?
My legs are pillars,
The body the shrine,
The head a cupola of gold.
Listen, Koodalasangama Deva,
Things standing shall fall,
But the moving ever shall stay.

Vachanas are brief paragraphs, and they end with one or the other local names under which Shiva is invoked or offered Pooja. In style, they are epigrammatical, parallelistic and allusive. They dwell on the vanity of riches, the valuelessness of mere rites or book learning, the uncertainty of life and the spiritual privileges of Shiva Bhakta (worshiper of lord Shiva). The Vachanas call men to give up the desire for worldly wealth and ease, to live lives of sobriety and detachment from the world and to turn to Siva for refuge.

Authors of a particular Vachana can be identified by the style of invocation of God (Basveshvara invokes "Kudala Sangama Deva", while Allama Prabhu invokes "Guheshwara", Akkamahadevi invokes "Channa Mallikarjuna", Siddhrama (Siddheshwar) of Solapur invokes "Kapilasidda Mallikarjuna") in the vachana. The existing readings of the vachanas are mostly set by the European understanding of the Indian traditions.

About 22,000 vachanas have been published. The government of Karnataka has published Samagra Vachana Samputa in 15 volumes. Karnataka University Dharwad has published collections of individual vachana poets.

Jedara Dasimaiah is called the 'Adya Vachanakara' (The First Vachanakara).

In spite of the large collection of Vachanas, there was no single place where all Vachanas could be obtained. The credit for restoring the Vachana literature goes to Vachana Pitamaha D. P.G Halakatti. He moved from door to door and collected and restored many Vachana literatures.

== See also ==
- Kalachuris of Kalyani Kingdom
- Kannada literature
- Palkuriki Somanatha

== Sources ==
- Vachana Sahityha
- Vachanas by Sri Basavanna, Dasimayya, Akka Mahadheviyavaru and Allamaprabhu dhevaru (trans. AK Ramanujan)
- Vachana Sahitya Web Site Published by Government of Karnataka
- Vachana Sanchaya, Vachana Sahitya Digitization & Research Project
