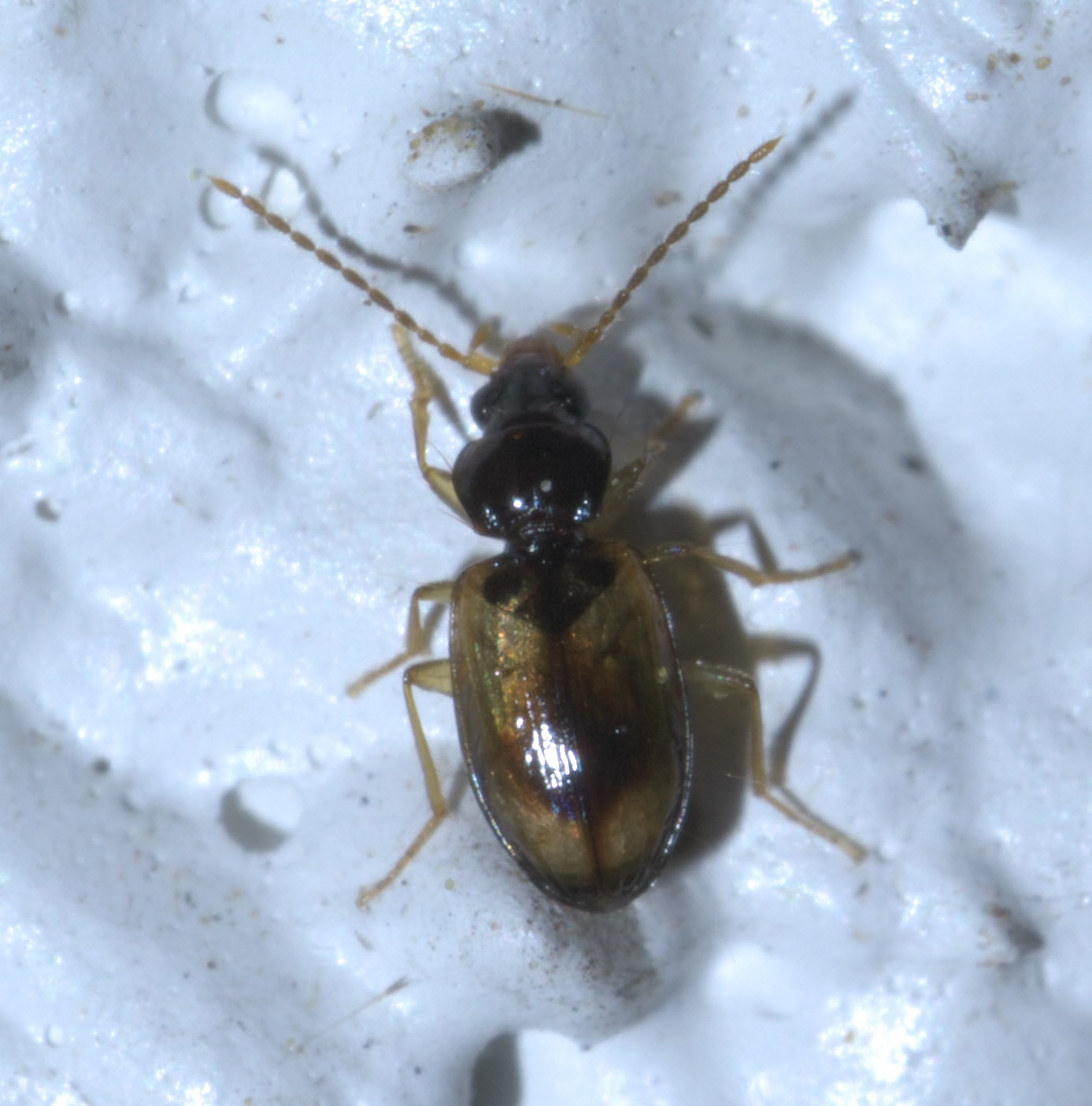
- Bembidion

Scientific classification
- Domain: Eukaryota
- Kingdom: Animalia
- Phylum: Arthropoda
- Class: Insecta
- Order: Coleoptera
- Suborder: Adephaga
- Family: Carabidae
- Subfamily: Trechinae
- Tribe: Bembidiini; Stephens, 1827

Subtribes
- Anillina; Bembidiina Stephens, 1827; Horologionina Jeannel, 1949; Lovriciina Giachino; B.Gueorguiev & Vailati, 2011; Tachyina Motschulsky, 1862; Xystosomina

= Bembidiini =

Tribe of beetles

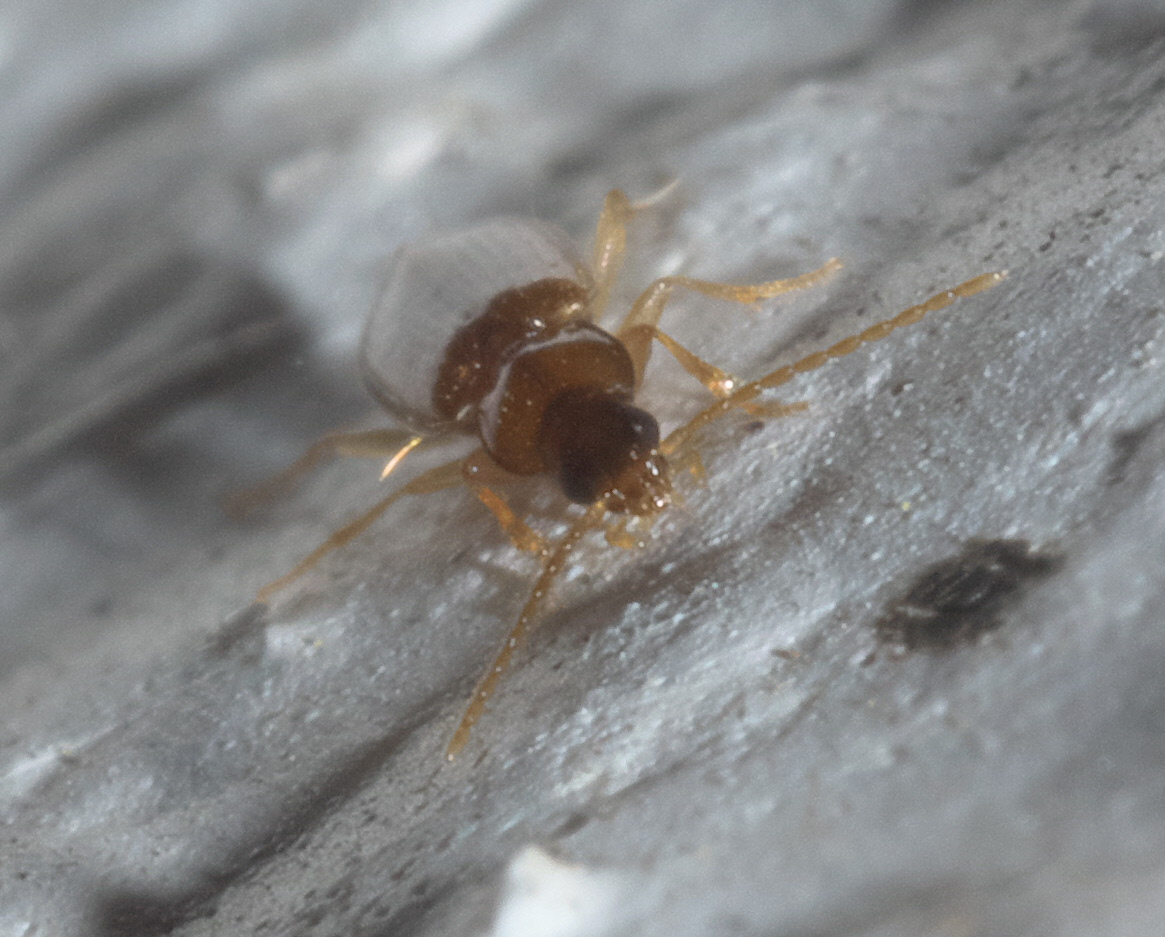
Micratopus

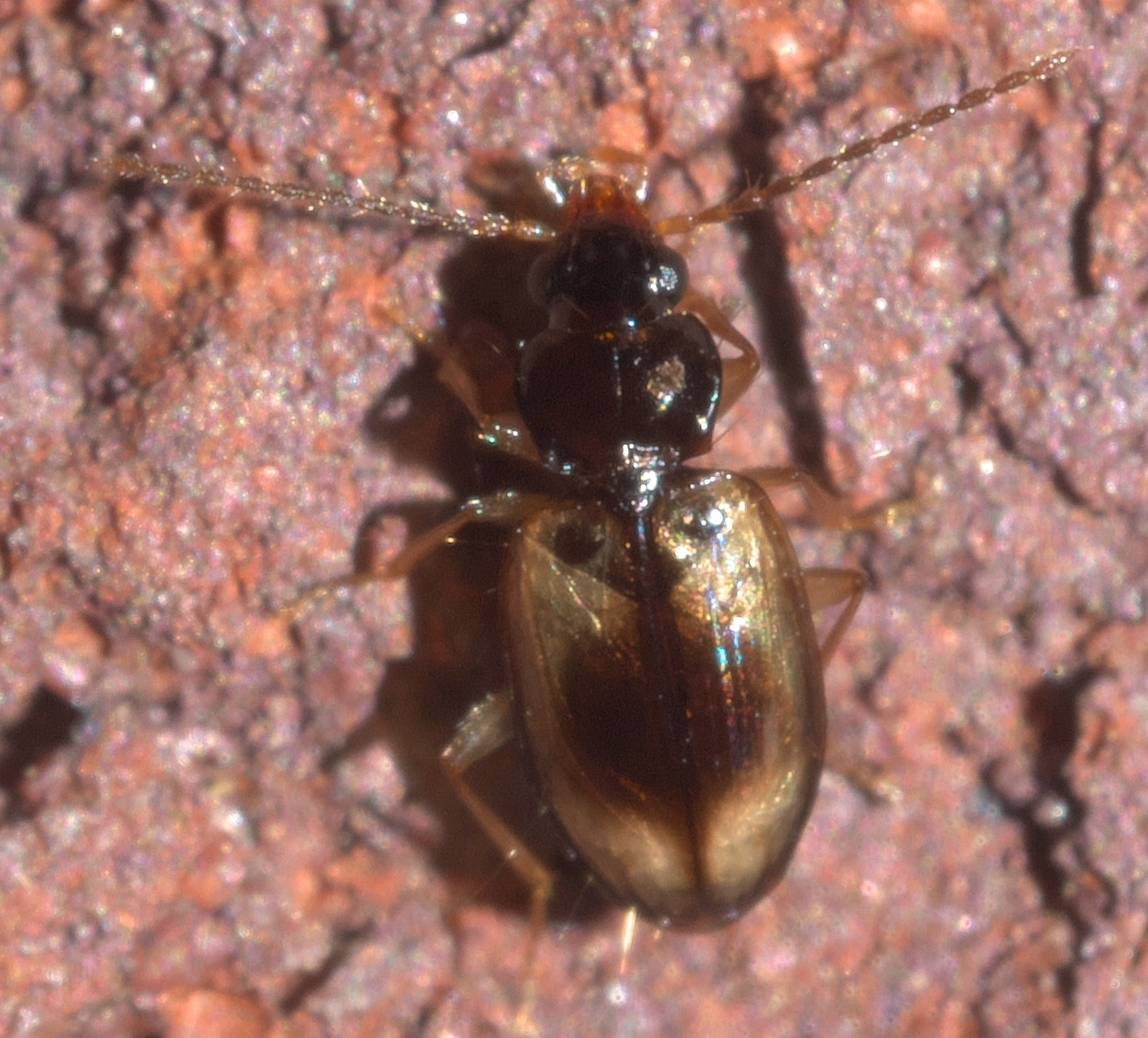
Tachys proximus, Oklahoma

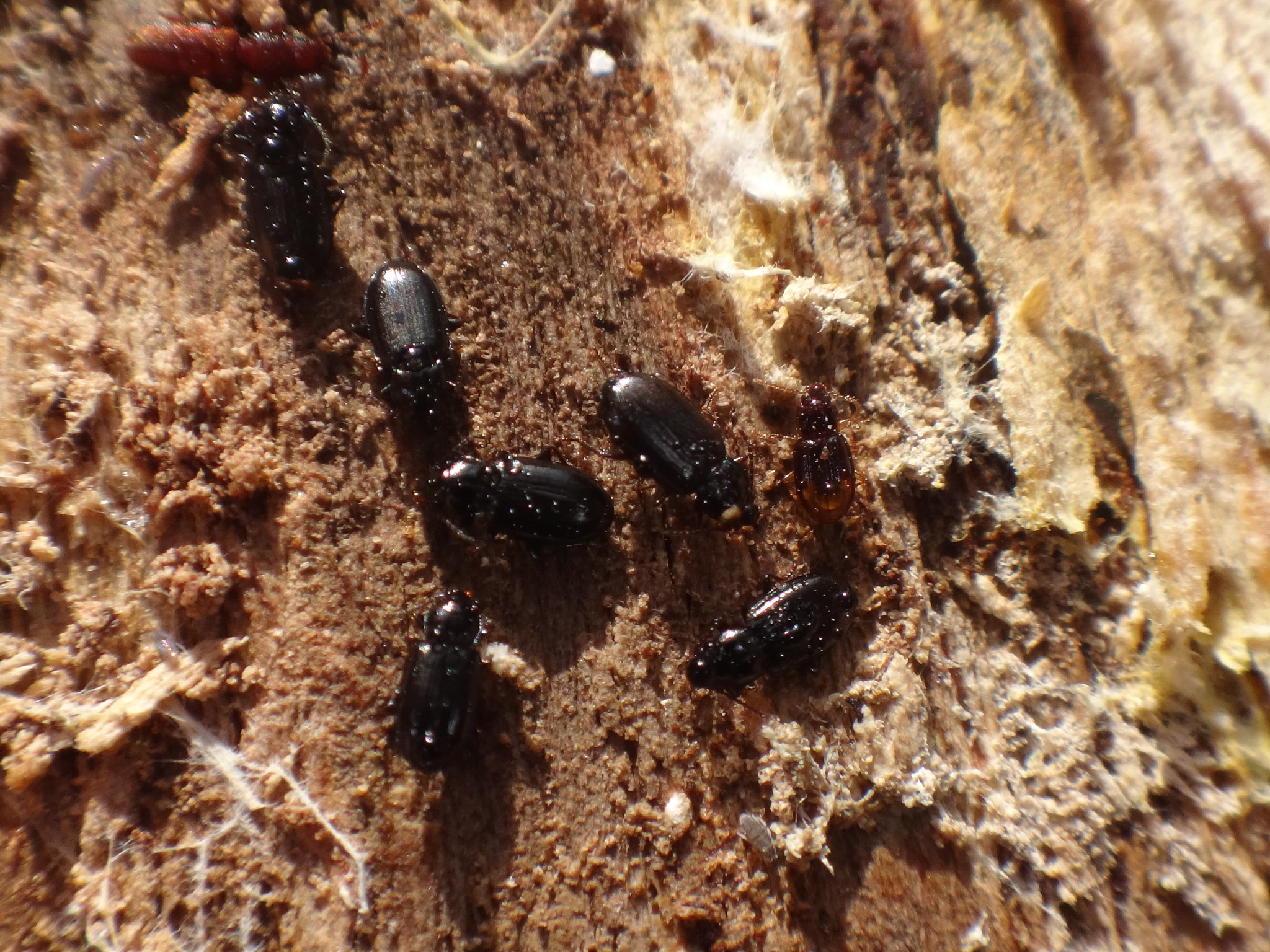
Mioptachys flavicauda, Pennsylvania

Bembidiini is a tribe of ground beetles in the family Carabidae. There are more than 120 genera and 3,100 described species in Bembidiini.

== Genera ==
Subtribe Anillina Jeannel, 1937
Afranillus Giachino, 2015
Afrodipnus Giachino, 2015
Angustanillus Baehr & Main, 2016
Anillaspis Casey, 1918
Anillinus Casey, 1918
Anillodes Jeannel, 1963
Anillopsidius Coiffait, 1969
Anillopsis Jeannel, 1937
Anillotarsus Mateu, 1980
Anillus Jacquelin du Val, 1851
Argiloborus Jeannel, 1937
Austranillus Giachino, 2005
Bafutyphlus Bruneau de Miré, 1986
Bhutanillus M.E.Schmid, 1975
Bulirschia Giachino, 2008
Bylibaraphanus Giachino; Eberhard & Perina, 2021
Caeconannus Jeannel, 1963
Caecoparvus Jeannel, 1937
Carayonites Bruneau de Miré, 1986
Cryptocharidius M.Etonti & Mateu, 1992
Cryptorites Jeannel, 1950
Dicropterus Ehlers, 1883
Elgonotyphlus Sciaky & Zaballos, 1993
Erwinanillus Giachino; Eberhard & Perina, 2021
Externanillus Baehr & Main, 2016
Geocharidius Jeannel, 1963
Geocharis Ehlers, 1883
Gilesdytes Giachino; Eberhard & Perina, 2021
Gracilanillus Baehr & Main, 2016
Gregorydytes Giachino; Eberhard & Perina, 2021
Hesperanillus Baehr & Main, 2016
Honduranillus Zaballos, 1997
Hygranillus B.Moore, 1980
Hypodipnites Jeannel, 1963
Hypotyphlus Jeannel, 1937
Iason Giachino & Vailati, 2011
Iberanillus Español, 1971
Illaphanus W.J.MacLeay, 1865
Kimberleytyphlus Giachino; Eberhard & Perina, 2021
Leleupanillus Basilewsky, 1976
Magnanillus Baehr, 2017
Malagasydipnus Giachino, 2008
Malagasytyphlus Giachino, 2008
Megastylulus Giachino & Sciaky, 2003
Mexanillus Vigna Taglianti, 1973
Microdipnites Jeannel, 1957
Microdipnodes Basilewsky, 1960
Microdipnus Jeannel, 1937
Microtyphlus Linder, 1863
Mystroceridius Reichardt, 1972
Neodipnus Jeannel, 1957
Neoillaphanus Giachino; Eberhard & Perina, 2021
Nesamblyops Jeannel, 1937
Nothanillus Jeannel, 1962
Orthotyphlus Mateu & Zaballos, 1998
Paranillopsis Cicchino & Roig-Juñent, 2001
Paranillus Jeannel, 1949
Parillaphanus Baehr, 2018
Parvocaecus Coiffait, 1956
Pelocharis Jeannel, 1960
Pelodiaetodes B.Moore, 1980
Pelodiaetus Jeannel, 1937
Pelonomites Jeannel, 1963
Perucharidius Mateu & M.Etonti, 2002
Pilbaradytes Giachino; Eberhard & Perina, 2021
Pilbaranillus Baehr & Main, 2016
Pilbaraphanus Giachino; Eberhard & Perina, 2021
Prioniomus Jeannel, 1937
Pseudanillus Bedel, 1896
Pseudillaphanus Giachino, 2005
Rhegmatobius Jeannel, 1937
Scotodipnus Schaum, 1860
Selenodipnus Jeannel, 1963
Serranillus Barr, 1995
Serratotyphlus Giachino, 2008
Stylulus L.Schaufuss, 1882
Tasmanillus Giachino, 2005
Typhlocharis Dieck, 1869
Typhlonesiotes Jeannel, 1937
Winklerites Jeannel, 1937
Zapotecanillus Sokolov, 2013
Zeanillus Jeannel, 1937
Zoianillus Sciaky, 1994
Subtribe Bembidiina Stephens, 1827
Amerizus Chaudoir, 1868
Asaphidion Gozis, 1886
Bembidion Latreille, 1802
Caecidium Ueno, 1971
Lionepha Casey, 1918
Ocys Stephens, 1828
Orzolina Machado, 1987
Sinechostictus Motschulsky, 1864
Subtribe Horologionina Jeannel, 1949
Horologion Valentine, 1932
Subtribe Lovriciina Giachino; B.Gueorguiev & Vailati, 2011
Lovricia Pretner, 1979
Neolovricia Lakota; Jalzic & J.Moravec, 2009
Paralovricia Giachino; B.Gueorguiev & Vailati, 2011
Subtribe Tachyina Motschulsky, 1862
Aenigmatachys Baehr, 2020
Afrotachys Basilewsky, 1958
Anomotachys Jeannel, 1946
Costitachys Erwin, 1974
Elaphropus Motschulsky, 1839
Kiwitachys Larochelle & Larivière, 2007
Liotachys Bates, 1871
Lymnastis Motschulsky, 1862
Meotachys Erwin, 1974
Micratopus Casey, 1914
Moirainpa Erwin, 1984
Nothoderis Boyd & Erwin, 2016
Pericompsus LeConte, 1852
Polyderidius Jeannel, 1962
Porotachys Netolitzky, 1914
Setitachys Baehr, 2016
Stigmatachys Boyd & Erwin, 2016
Straneoites Basilewsky, 1947
Tachys Dejean, 1821
Tachysbembix Erwin, 2004
Tachyta Kirby, 1837
Tachyxysta Boyd & Erwin, 2016
Subtribe Xystosomina Erwin, 1994
Erwiniana Paulsen & A.Smith, 2003
Geballusa Erwin, 1994
Gouleta Erwin, 1994
Inpa Erwin, 1978
Mioptachys Bates, 1882
Philipis Erwin, 1994
Xystosomus Schaum, 1863
