= Bembidion acticola =

Scientific classification
- Kingdom: Animalia
- Phylum: Arthropoda
- Class: Insecta
- Order: Coleoptera
- Suborder: Adephaga
- Family: Carabidae
- Subfamily: Trechinae
- Tribe: Bembidiini
- Subtribe: Bembidiina
- Genus: Bembidion
- Species: B. acticola

Binomial name
- Bembidion acticola Casey, 1884

Synonyms
- Bembidion argutum Casey, 1918; Bembidion assensum Casey, 1924

Species of beetle

Bembidion acticola is a species of beetle in the family Carabidae. It is found along the East Coast of the United States, from Maryland to Long Island.
