= Hypotyphlus =

Scientific classification
- Domain: Eukaryota
- Kingdom: Animalia
- Phylum: Arthropoda
- Class: Insecta
- Order: Coleoptera
- Suborder: Adephaga
- Family: Carabidae
- Subfamily: Trechinae
- Tribe: Bembidiini
- Subtribe: Anillina
- Genus: Hypotyphlus; Jeannel, 1937

Genus of beetles

Hypotyphlus is a genus of ground beetles in the family Carabidae. There are about 16 described species in Hypotyphlus.

== Species ==
These 16 species belong to the genus Hypotyphlus:

- Hypotyphlus andorranus Español & Comas, 1984
- Hypotyphlus aubei (Saulcy, 1863)
- Hypotyphlus bastianinii Magrini & Vanni, 1994
- Hypotyphlus degiovannii Magrini, 2013
- Hypotyphlus guadarramus (Ehlers, 1883)
- Hypotyphlus huetei Ortuño, 1997
- Hypotyphlus lidiae Hernando & Fresneda, 1993
- Hypotyphlus lorinae Avon & Courtial, 2009
- Hypotyphlus lusitanicus J.Serrano & Aguiar, 2004
- Hypotyphlus navaricus (Coiffait, 1958)
- Hypotyphlus pandellei (Saulcy, 1867)
- Hypotyphlus revelieri (Perris, 1866)
- Hypotyphlus rialensis (Guillebeau, 1890)
- Hypotyphlus ribagorzanus (Bolivar y Pieltain, 1919)
- Hypotyphlus sardous (Jeannel, 1937)
- Hypotyphlus sotilloi Español, 1971
