= Scotodipnus =

Scientific classification
- Domain: Eukaryota
- Kingdom: Animalia
- Phylum: Arthropoda
- Class: Insecta
- Order: Coleoptera
- Suborder: Adephaga
- Family: Carabidae
- Subfamily: Trechinae
- Tribe: Bembidiini
- Subtribe: Anillina
- Genus: Scotodipnus; Schaum, 1860

Subgenera
- Binaghites Jeannel, 1937; Scotodipnus Schaum, 1860

Synonyms
- Binaghites

Genus of beetles

Scotodipnus is a genus of ground beetles in the family Carabidae. There are about 10 described species in Scotodipnus, found in Europe.

== Species ==
These 10 species belong to the genus Scotodipnus:

- Scotodipnus affinis Baudi di Selve, 1871
- Scotodipnus alpinus Baudi di Selve, 1871
- Scotodipnus armellinii Ganglbauer, 1900
- Scotodipnus diottii (Magrini, 2008)
- Scotodipnus fagniezi Jeannel, 1937
- Scotodipnus glaber (Baudi di Selve, 1859)
- Scotodipnus grajus Jeannel, 1937
- Scotodipnus hirtus Dieck, 1869
- Scotodipnus mayeti Abeille de Perrin, 1892
- Scotodipnus subalpinus Baudi di Selve, 1871
