= Serranillus =

Scientific classification
- Domain: Eukaryota
- Kingdom: Animalia
- Phylum: Arthropoda
- Class: Insecta
- Order: Coleoptera
- Suborder: Adephaga
- Family: Carabidae
- Subfamily: Trechinae
- Tribe: Bembidiini
- Subtribe: Anillina
- Genus: Serranillus; Barr, 1995

Genus of beetles

Serranillus is a genus of ground beetles in the family Carabidae. There are at least three described species in Serranillus, found in the United States.

== Species ==
These three species belong to the genus Serranillus:

- Serranillus dunavani (Jeannel, 1963)
- Serranillus jeanneli Barr, 1995
- Serranillus septentrionis Sokolov & Carlton, 2008
