= Philipis =

Scientific classification
- Domain: Eukaryota
- Kingdom: Animalia
- Phylum: Arthropoda
- Class: Insecta
- Order: Coleoptera
- Suborder: Adephaga
- Family: Carabidae
- Subfamily: Trechinae
- Tribe: Bembidiini
- Subtribe: Xystosomina
- Genus: Philipis; Erwin, 1994

Genus of beetles

Philipis is a genus in the beetle family Carabidae. There are more than 40 described species in Philipis, found in Australia.

== Species ==
These 42 species belong to the genus Philipis:

- Philipis agnicapitis Baehr, 1995
- Philipis alpina Baehr, 2007
- Philipis alticola Baehr, 1995
- Philipis alutacea Baehr, 1995
- Philipis atra Baehr, 1995
- Philipis bicolor Baehr, 1995
- Philipis castanea Baehr, 1995
- Philipis cooki Baehr, 1995
- Philipis distinguenda Baehr, 1995
- Philipis ellioti Baehr, 1995
- Philipis frerei Baehr, 1995
- Philipis geoffreyi Baehr, 1995
- Philipis heatherae Baehr, 1995
- Philipis inermis Baehr, 1995
- Philipis inexspectata Baehr, 2002
- Philipis laevigata Baehr, 1995
- Philipis laevis Baehr, 1995
- Philipis lawrencei Baehr, 2007
- Philipis lustrans Baehr, 1995
- Philipis minor Baehr, 1995
- Philipis novaeangliae Baehr, 2017
- Philipis perstriata Baehr, 1995
- Philipis picea Baehr, 1995
- Philipis picta Baehr, 1995
- Philipis planicola Baehr, 1995
- Philipis quadraticollis Baehr, 1995
- Philipis reticulata Baehr, 1995
- Philipis rufescens Baehr, 1995
- Philipis ruficollis Baehr, 1995
- Philipis sinuata Baehr, 1995
- Philipis spurgeoni Baehr, 1995
- Philipis striata Baehr, 1995
- Philipis striatoides Baehr, 2002
- Philipis subtropica Baehr, 1995
- Philipis sulcata Baehr, 1995
- Philipis thompsoni Baehr, 1995
- Philipis tribulationis Baehr, 1995
- Philipis trunci (Darlington, 1963)
- Philipis unicolor Baehr, 1995
- Philipis unistriata Baehr, 2002
- Philipis vicina Baehr, 1995
- Philipis weiri Baehr, 2007
