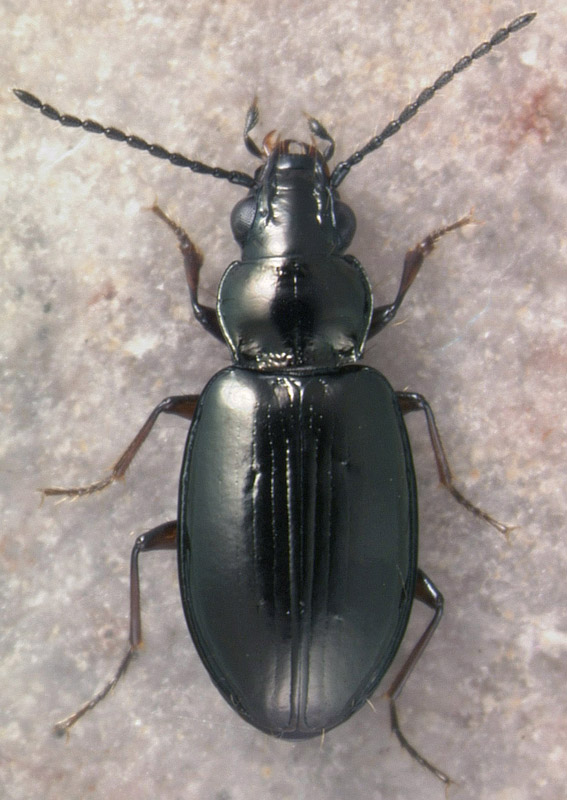

Scientific classification
- Kingdom: Animalia
- Phylum: Arthropoda
- Clade: Pancrustacea
- Class: Insecta
- Order: Coleoptera
- Suborder: Adephaga
- Family: Carabidae
- Genus: Lionepha
- Species: L. casta

Binomial name
- Lionepha casta (Casey, 1918)

Synonyms
- Bembidion brumale Casey, 1918; Bembidion castum Casey, 1918

= Lionepha casta =

Species of beetle

Lionepha casta is a species of ground beetle in the family Carabidae. It is found in North America.
