= Cryptocharidius =

Scientific classification
- Domain: Eukaryota
- Kingdom: Animalia
- Phylum: Arthropoda
- Class: Insecta
- Order: Coleoptera
- Suborder: Adephaga
- Family: Carabidae
- Tribe: Bembidiini
- Subtribe: Anillina
- Genus: Cryptocharidius; M.Etonti & Mateu, 1992
- Species: C. mandibularis

Binomial name
- Cryptocharidius mandibularis M.Etonti & Mateu, 1992

Genus of beetles

Cryptocharidius is a genus of ground beetles in the family Carabidae. This genus has a single species, Cryptocharidius mandibularis.
