= Anillus =

Scientific classification
- Domain: Eukaryota
- Kingdom: Animalia
- Phylum: Arthropoda
- Class: Insecta
- Order: Coleoptera
- Suborder: Adephaga
- Family: Carabidae
- Subfamily: Trechinae
- Tribe: Bembidiini
- Subtribe: Anillina
- Genus: Anillus; Jacquelin du Val, 1851

Genus of beetles

Anillus is a genus of ground beetles in the family Carabidae. There are about 19 described species in Anillus.

== Species ==
These 19 species belong to the genus Anillus:

- Anillus angelae Magrini & Vanni, 1989
- Anillus bordonii Magrini & Vanni, 1993
- Anillus caecus Jacquelin du Val, 1851
- Anillus cebennicus Balazuc & Bruneau de Miré, 1964
- Anillus cirocchii Magrini & Vanni, 1989
- Anillus convexus Saulcy, 1864
- Anillus corsicus Perris, 1869
- Anillus florentinus Dieck, 1869
- Anillus frater Aubé, 1863
- Anillus hypogaeus Aubé, 1861
- Anillus joffrei Sainte-Claire Deville, 1925
- Anillus latialis Jeannel, 1937
- Anillus marii Magrini & Vanni, 1989
- Anillus minervae Coiffait, 1956
- Anillus pacei Magrini & Vanni, 1993
- Anillus petriolii Magrini, 2014
- Anillus sekerai Reitter, 1906
- Anillus sulcatellus Coiffait, 1958
- Anillus virginiae Magrini & Vanni, 1993
