= Zapotecanillus =

Scientific classification
- Domain: Eukaryota
- Kingdom: Animalia
- Phylum: Arthropoda
- Class: Insecta
- Order: Coleoptera
- Suborder: Adephaga
- Family: Carabidae
- Subfamily: Trechinae
- Tribe: Bembidiini
- Subtribe: Anillina
- Genus: Zapotecanillus; Sokolov, 2013

Genus of beetles

Zapotecanillus is a genus of ground beetles in the family Carabidae. There are about eight described species in Zapotecanillus.

== Species ==
These eight species belong to the genus Zapotecanillus:

- Zapotecanillus iviei Sokolov, 2013
- Zapotecanillus ixtlanus Sokolov, 2013
- Zapotecanillus kavanaughi Sokolov, 2013
- Zapotecanillus longinoi Sokolov, 2013
- Zapotecanillus montanus Sokolov, 2013
- Zapotecanillus nanus Sokolov, 2013
- Zapotecanillus oaxacanus Sokolov, 2013
- Zapotecanillus pecki Sokolov, 2013
