= Rhegmatobius =

Scientific classification
- Domain: Eukaryota
- Kingdom: Animalia
- Phylum: Arthropoda
- Class: Insecta
- Order: Coleoptera
- Suborder: Adephaga
- Family: Carabidae
- Subfamily: Trechinae
- Tribe: Bembidiini
- Subtribe: Anillina
- Genus: Rhegmatobius; Jeannel, 1937

Genus of beetles

Rhegmatobius is a genus of ground beetles in the family Carabidae. There are about eight described species in Rhegmatobius.

== Species ==
These eight species belong to the genus Rhegmatobius:

- Rhegmatobius agostini Jeannel, 1937 (Sardinia and Italy)
- Rhegmatobius bastianinii Magrini & Casale, 2015 (Italy)
- Rhegmatobius fiorii (Ganglbauer, 1900) (Italy)
- Rhegmatobius paganettii Magrini & Pavesi, 1998 (Italy)
- Rhegmatobius petriolii Magrini & Degiovanni, 2008 (Italy)
- Rhegmatobius quadricollis (Ehlers, 1883) (Italy)
- Rhegmatobius solarii Magrini & Sciaky, 1995 (Italy)
- Rhegmatobius strictus (Baudi di Selve, 1891) (Sardinia and Italy)
