= Iason (beetle) =

Scientific classification
- Domain: Eukaryota
- Kingdom: Animalia
- Phylum: Arthropoda
- Class: Insecta
- Order: Coleoptera
- Suborder: Adephaga
- Family: Carabidae
- Subfamily: Trechinae
- Tribe: Bembidiini
- Subtribe: Anillina
- Genus: Iason; Giachino & Vailati, 2011

Genus of beetles

Iason is a genus in the ground beetle family Carabidae. There are about nine described species in Iason, found in Greece.

== Species ==
These nine species belong to the genus Iason:

- Iason argonauta Giachino & Vailati, 2011
- Iason beroni Giachino & Vailati, 2011
- Iason fulvii Giachino & Vailati, 2011
- Iason karametasi Giachino & Vailati, 2011
- Iason lompei Giachino & Vailati, 2019
- Iason minoicus Giachino & Vailati, 2019
- Iason olympicus (Casale, 1977)
- Iason paglianoi Giachino & Vailati, 2011
- Iason rossii Giachino & Vailati, 2011
