= Microdipnites =

Scientific classification
- Domain: Eukaryota
- Kingdom: Animalia
- Phylum: Arthropoda
- Class: Insecta
- Order: Coleoptera
- Suborder: Adephaga
- Family: Carabidae
- Subfamily: Trechinae
- Tribe: Bembidiini
- Subtribe: Anillina
- Genus: Microdipnites; Jeannel, 1957

Genus of beetles

Microdipnites is a genus of ground beetles in the family Carabidae. There are about six described species in Microdipnites.

== Species ==
These six species belong to the genus Microdipnites:

- Microdipnites kahuzianus (Basilewsky, 1951)
- Microdipnites mahnerti Garetto & Giachino, 1999
- Microdipnites minutissimus (Basilewsky, 1954)
- Microdipnites perreti Garetto & Giachino, 1999
- Microdipnites vanschuytbroecki Bruneau de Miré, 1990
- Microdipnites zicsii Giachino, 2015
