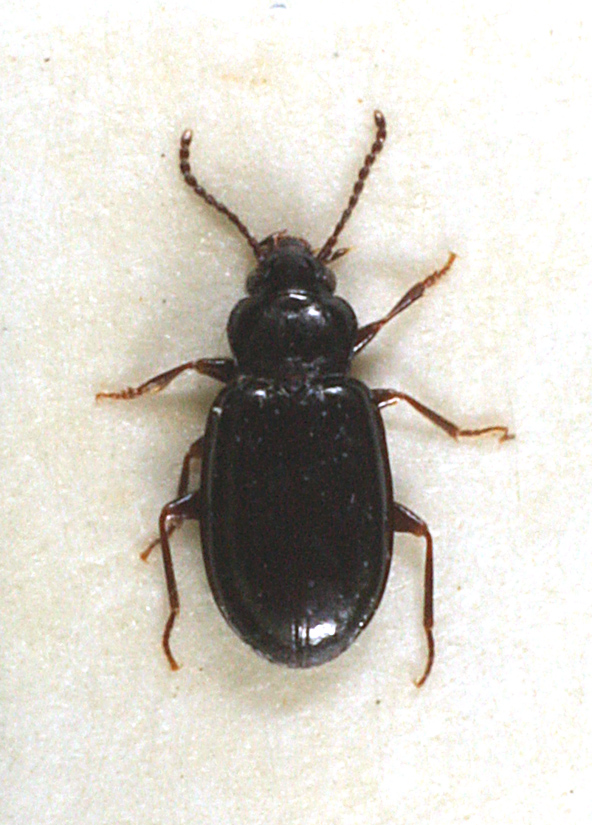
- Tachyta nana

Scientific classification
- Domain: Eukaryota
- Kingdom: Animalia
- Phylum: Arthropoda
- Class: Insecta
- Order: Coleoptera
- Suborder: Adephaga
- Family: Carabidae
- Subfamily: Trechinae
- Tribe: Bembidiini
- Subtribe: Tachyina
- Genus: Tachyta; Kirby, 1837

Subgenera
- Australotachyta Baehr, 2013; Eurytachyta Baehr, 2016; Paratachyta Erwin, 1975; Tachyta Kirby, 1837

= Tachyta =

Genus of beetles

Tachyta is a genus of ground beetles in the family Carabidae. There are more than 30 described species in Tachyta.

== Species ==
These 32 species belong to the genus Tachyta:

- Tachyta acuticollis (Putzeys, 1875) (Oceania)
- Tachyta alutacea Baehr, 2013 (Australia)
- Tachyta angulata Casey, 1918 (North America)
- Tachyta barda (Darlington, 1962) (New Guinea)
- Tachyta brunnipennis (W.J.MacLeay, 1871) (Australia)
- Tachyta coracina (Putzeys, 1875) (South and Southeast Asia)
- Tachyta falli (Hayward, 1900) (North America)
- Tachyta gilloglyi Erwin, 1975 (Vietnam)
- Tachyta guineensis Alluaud, 1933 (Sub-Saharan Africa)
- Tachyta hispaniolae (Darlington, 1934) (Hispaniola)
- Tachyta inornata (Say, 1823) (Central and North America)
- Tachyta insularum Baehr, 2018 (Australia)
- Tachyta kirbyi Casey, 1918 (North America)
- Tachyta laticollis Baehr, 2016 (Borneo, Indonesia, and Malaysia)
- Tachyta maa Erwin & Kavanaugh, 1999 (China)
- Tachyta malayica (Andrewes, 1925) (Southeast Asia)
- Tachyta monostigma (Andrewes, 1925) (Singapore)
- Tachyta nana (Gyllenhal, 1810) (Europe & Northern Asia)
- Tachyta ovata Baehr, 1986 (Australia)
- Tachyta palmerstoni Baehr, 2006
- Tachyta parvicornis Notman, 1922 (North America)
- Tachyta philipi Erwin, 1975 (New Guinea)
- Tachyta picina (Boheman, 1848) (Madagascar, Mozambique, and South Africa)
- Tachyta pseudovirens Bruneau de Miré, 1964 (West Africa)
- Tachyta punctipennis Baehr, 2013 (Australia)
- Tachyta quadrinotata Baehr, 2016 (Nepal)
- Tachyta quadriplagiata Baehr, 2014 (Vietnam)
- Tachyta rexensis B.Moore, 2001 (Australia)
- Tachyta subvirens Chaudoir, 1878 (Africa)
- Tachyta taiwanica Terada & Wu, 2014 (Taiwan and temperate Asia)
- Tachyta umbrosa (Motschulsky, 1851) (East and Southeast Asia)
- Tachyta wallacei (Andrewes, 1925) (Indonesia and New Guinea)
