= Tasmanillus =

Scientific classification
- Domain: Eukaryota
- Kingdom: Animalia
- Phylum: Arthropoda
- Class: Insecta
- Order: Coleoptera
- Suborder: Adephaga
- Family: Carabidae
- Subfamily: Trechinae
- Tribe: Bembidiini
- Subtribe: Anillina
- Genus: Tasmanillus; Giachino, 2005

Genus of beetles

Tasmanillus is a genus of ground beetles in the family Carabidae. It includes at least two described species, both found in Australia.

== Species ==
These two species belong to the genus Tasmanillus:

- Tasmanillus daccordii Giachino, 2005
- Tasmanillus pillingeri Giachino, 2005
