= Paranillopsis =

Scientific classification
- Domain: Eukaryota
- Kingdom: Animalia
- Phylum: Arthropoda
- Class: Insecta
- Order: Coleoptera
- Suborder: Adephaga
- Family: Carabidae
- Subfamily: Trechinae
- Tribe: Bembidiini
- Subtribe: Anillina
- Genus: Paranillopsis; Cicchino & Roig-Juñent, 2001

Genus of beetles

Paranillopsis is a genus of ground beetles in the family Carabidae. There are at least two described species in Paranillopsis found in Argentina.

== Species ==
These two species belong to the genus Paranillopsis:

- Paranillopsis pampensis Cicchino & Roig-Juñent, 2001
- Paranillopsis piguensis Cicchino & Roig-Juñent, 2001
