= Straneoites =

Scientific classification
- Domain: Eukaryota
- Kingdom: Animalia
- Phylum: Arthropoda
- Class: Insecta
- Order: Coleoptera
- Suborder: Adephaga
- Family: Carabidae
- Tribe: Bembidiini
- Subtribe: Tachyina
- Genus: Straneoites; Basilewsky, 1947
- Species: S. morogoro

Binomial name
- Straneoites morogoro Basilewsky, 1947

Genus of beetles

Straneoites is a genus of ground beetles in the family Carabidae. This genus has a single species, Straneoites morogoro. It is found in Tanzania.
