= Geballusa =

Scientific classification
- Domain: Eukaryota
- Kingdom: Animalia
- Phylum: Arthropoda
- Class: Insecta
- Order: Coleoptera
- Suborder: Adephaga
- Family: Carabidae
- Subfamily: Trechinae
- Tribe: Bembidiini
- Subtribe: Xystosomina
- Genus: Geballusa; Erwin, 1994

Genus of beetles

Geballusa is a genus in the ground beetle family Carabidae. There are about five described species in Geballusa, found in Central and South America.

== Species ==
These five species belong to the genus Geballusa:

- Geballusa microtreta (Erwin, 1973) (Costa Rica)
- Geballusa nannotreta Erwin, 1994 (Brazil)
- Geballusa oligotreta Erwin, 1994 (Panama)
- Geballusa polytreta (Erwin, 1973) (Brazil)
- Geballusa rex Erwin, 1994 (Brazil)
