= Iberanillus =

Scientific classification
- Domain: Eukaryota
- Kingdom: Animalia
- Phylum: Arthropoda
- Class: Insecta
- Order: Coleoptera
- Suborder: Adephaga
- Family: Carabidae
- Tribe: Bembidiini
- Subtribe: Anillina
- Genus: Iberanillus; Español, 1971
- Species: I. vinyasi

Binomial name
- Iberanillus vinyasi Español, 1971

Genus of beetles

Iberanillus is a genus of ground beetles in the family Carabidae. This genus has a single species, Iberanillus vinyasi.
