= Illaphanus =

Scientific classification
- Domain: Eukaryota
- Kingdom: Animalia
- Phylum: Arthropoda
- Class: Insecta
- Order: Coleoptera
- Suborder: Adephaga
- Family: Carabidae
- Subfamily: Trechinae
- Tribe: Bembidiini
- Subtribe: Anillina
- Genus: Illaphanus; W.J.MacLeay, 1865

Genus of beetles

Illaphanus is a genus of ground beetles in the family Carabidae. There are more than 30 described species in Illaphanus.

== Species ==
These 31 species belong to the genus Illaphanus:

- Illaphanus annani Giachino, 2005
- Illaphanus brittoni Giachino, 2005
- Illaphanus calderi Giachino, 2005
- Illaphanus chiarae Giachino, 2005
- Illaphanus cooki Giachino, 2005
- Illaphanus endeavouri Giachino, 2005
- Illaphanus eungellae Giachino, 2005
- Illaphanus gillisoni Giachino, 2005
- Illaphanus hanni Giachino, 2005
- Illaphanus lawrencei Giachino, 2005
- Illaphanus lordhowei Giachino, 2005
- Illaphanus mallacootae Giachino, 2005
- Illaphanus matthewsi Giachino, 2005
- Illaphanus montanus Giachino, 2005
- Illaphanus monteithi Giachino, 2005
- Illaphanus montislewisi Giachino, 2005
- Illaphanus moorei Giachino, 2005
- Illaphanus newtoni Giachino, 2005
- Illaphanus norfolkensis Giachino, 2005
- Illaphanus nothofagi Giachino, 2005
- Illaphanus oakviewensis Baehr, 2018
- Illaphanus pecki Giachino, 2005
- Illaphanus pteridophyticus Giachino, 2005
- Illaphanus stephensii W.J.MacLeay, 1865
- Illaphanus thayeri Giachino, 2005
- Illaphanus thompsoni Giachino, 2005
- Illaphanus toledanoi Giachino, 2005
- Illaphanus victoriae Giachino, 2005
- Illaphanus walfordi Baehr, 2018
- Illaphanus weiri Giachino, 2005
- Illaphanus windsori Giachino, 2005
