= Microdipnus =

Scientific classification
- Domain: Eukaryota
- Kingdom: Animalia
- Phylum: Arthropoda
- Class: Insecta
- Order: Coleoptera
- Suborder: Adephaga
- Family: Carabidae
- Subfamily: Trechinae
- Tribe: Bembidiini
- Subtribe: Anillina
- Genus: Microdipnus; Jeannel, 1937

Genus of beetles

Microdipnus is a genus of ground beetles in the family Carabidae. There are about eight described species in Microdipnus.

== Species ==
These eight species belong to the genus Microdipnus:

- Microdipnus corradoi Giachino, 2008 (Africa)
- Microdipnus gugheensis Jeannel, 1950 (Africa)
- Microdipnus janaki Giachino, 2008 (Africa)
- Microdipnus jeanneli (Alluaud, 1917) (Africa)
- Microdipnus kilimanus Jeannel, 1957 (Africa)
- Microdipnus latus Jeannel, 1963 (South Africa)
- Microdipnus madecassus Jeannel, 1954 (Africa)
- Microdipnus peyrierasi Basilewsky, 1973 (Africa)
