= Pelonomites =

Scientific classification
- Domain: Eukaryota
- Kingdom: Animalia
- Phylum: Arthropoda
- Class: Insecta
- Order: Coleoptera
- Suborder: Adephaga
- Family: Carabidae
- Subfamily: Trechinae
- Tribe: Bembidiini
- Subtribe: Anillina
- Genus: Pelonomites; Jeannel, 1963

Genus of beetles

Pelonomites is a genus of ground beetles in the family Carabidae. There are about five described species in Pelonomites.

== Species ==
These five species belong to the genus Pelonomites:

- Pelonomites celisi (Basilewsky, 1954) (the Democratic Republic of the Congo and Uganda)
- Pelonomites coiffaiti Bruneau de Miré, 1990 (the Democratic Republic of the Congo)
- Pelonomites leleupi (Basilewsky, 1953) (the Democratic Republic of the Congo)
- Pelonomites mahunkai Giachino, 2015 (Tanzania)
- Pelonomites vignai Zaballos & Casale, 1998 (Kenya)
