= Zoianillus =

Scientific classification
- Domain: Eukaryota
- Kingdom: Animalia
- Phylum: Arthropoda
- Class: Insecta
- Order: Coleoptera
- Suborder: Adephaga
- Family: Carabidae
- Tribe: Bembidiini
- Subtribe: Anillina
- Genus: Zoianillus; Sciaky, 1994
- Species: Z. acutipennis

Binomial name
- Zoianillus acutipennis Sciaky, 1994

Genus of beetles

Zoianillus is a genus of ground beetles in the family Carabidae. This genus has a single species, Zoianillus acutipennis. It is found in Ecuador.
