= Neolovricia =

Scientific classification
- Domain: Eukaryota
- Kingdom: Animalia
- Phylum: Arthropoda
- Class: Insecta
- Order: Coleoptera
- Suborder: Adephaga
- Family: Carabidae
- Tribe: Bembidiini
- Subtribe: Lovriciina
- Genus: Neolovricia; Lakota & Jalzic&J.Moravec, 2009
- Species: N. ozimeci

Binomial name
- Neolovricia ozimeci Lakota; Jalzic & J.Moravec, 2009

Genus of beetles

Neolovricia is a genus of ground beetles in the family Carabidae. This genus has a single species, Neolovricia ozimeci. It is found in Croatia.
