= Moirainpa =

Scientific classification
- Domain: Eukaryota
- Kingdom: Animalia
- Phylum: Arthropoda
- Class: Insecta
- Order: Coleoptera
- Suborder: Adephaga
- Family: Carabidae
- Tribe: Bembidiini
- Subtribe: Tachyina
- Genus: Moirainpa; Erwin, 1984
- Species: M. amazona

Binomial name
- Moirainpa amazona Erwin, 1984

Genus of beetles

Moirainpa is a genus of ground beetles in the family Carabidae. This genus has a single species, Moirainpa amazona. It is found in Brazil.
