= Anillopsis =

Scientific classification
- Domain: Eukaryota
- Kingdom: Animalia
- Phylum: Arthropoda
- Class: Insecta
- Order: Coleoptera
- Suborder: Adephaga
- Family: Carabidae
- Subfamily: Trechinae
- Tribe: Bembidiini
- Subtribe: Anillina
- Genus: Anillopsis; Jeannel, 1937

Genus of beetles

Anillopsis is a genus of beetles in the family Carabidae, found in Africa. Anillopsis contains the following species:

- Anillopsis capensis (Peringuey, 1896)
- Anillopsis franzi Basilewsky, 1971
