= Gouleta =

Scientific classification
- Domain: Eukaryota
- Kingdom: Animalia
- Phylum: Arthropoda
- Class: Insecta
- Order: Coleoptera
- Suborder: Adephaga
- Family: Carabidae
- Subfamily: Trechinae
- Tribe: Bembidiini
- Subtribe: Xystosomina
- Genus: Gouleta; Erwin, 1994

Genus of beetles

Gouleta is a genus of carabids in the beetle family Carabidae. There are at least four described species in Gouleta.

== Species ==
These four species belong to the genus Gouleta:

- Gouleta cayennensis (Dejean, 1831) (Central and South America)
- Gouleta gentryi Erwin, 1994 (Peru, Colombia)
- Gouleta notiophiloides (Erwin, 1973) (Brazil)
- Gouleta spangleri (Erwin, 1973) (Panama)
