= Paranillus =

Scientific classification
- Domain: Eukaryota
- Kingdom: Animalia
- Phylum: Arthropoda
- Class: Insecta
- Order: Coleoptera
- Suborder: Adephaga
- Family: Carabidae
- Subfamily: Trechinae
- Tribe: Bembidiini
- Subtribe: Anillina
- Genus: Paranillus; Jeannel, 1949

Genus of beetles

Paranillus is a genus of ground beetles in the family Carabidae. There are about 13 described species in Paranillus.

== Species ==
These 13 species belong to the genus Paranillus:

- Paranillus banari Giachino, 2015 (Madagascar)
- Paranillus elongatus Jeannel, 1963 (Madagascar)
- Paranillus insularis Giachino, 2008 (Seychelles)
- Paranillus janaki Giachino, 2008 (Madagascar)
- Paranillus latipennis Jeannel, 1958 (Madagascar)
- Paranillus longulus Jeannel, 1957 (Madagascar)
- Paranillus madecassus Giachino, 2015 (Madagascar)
- Paranillus milloti Jeannel, 1949 (Madagascar)
- Paranillus pauliani Jeannel, 1957 (Madagascar)
- Paranillus pavesii Giachino, 2008 (Madagascar)
- Paranillus punctatostriatus Jeannel, 1963 (Madagascar)
- Paranillus scapularis Jeannel, 1957 (Madagascar)
- Paranillus sogai Jeannel, 1963 (Madagascar)
