= Leleupanillus =

Scientific classification
- Domain: Eukaryota
- Kingdom: Animalia
- Phylum: Arthropoda
- Class: Insecta
- Order: Coleoptera
- Suborder: Adephaga
- Family: Carabidae
- Tribe: Bembidiini
- Subtribe: Anillina
- Genus: Leleupanillus; Basilewsky, 1976
- Species: L. uluguruanus

Binomial name
- Leleupanillus uluguruanus Basilewsky, 1976

Genus of beetles

Leleupanillus is a genus of ground beetles in the family Carabidae. This genus has a single species, Leleupanillus uluguruanus.
