= Parvocaecus =

Scientific classification
- Domain: Eukaryota
- Kingdom: Animalia
- Phylum: Arthropoda
- Class: Insecta
- Order: Coleoptera
- Suborder: Adephaga
- Family: Carabidae
- Subfamily: Trechinae
- Tribe: Bembidiini
- Subtribe: Anillina
- Genus: Parvocaecus; Coiffait, 1956

Genus of beetles

Parvocaecus is a genus of ground beetles in the family Carabidae. There are about five described species in Parvocaecus.

== Species ==
These five species belong to the genus Parvocaecus:

- Parvocaecus anatolicus (Coiffait, 1956) (Turkey)
- Parvocaecus assingi Giachino & Vailati, 2019 (Greece)
- Parvocaecus hetzeli Giachino & Vailati, 2019 (Greece)
- Parvocaecus perpusillus (Rottenberg, 1874) (Greece)
- Parvocaecus turcicus (Coiffait, 1956) (Turkey)
