= Anillotarsus =

Scientific classification
- Domain: Eukaryota
- Kingdom: Animalia
- Phylum: Arthropoda
- Class: Insecta
- Order: Coleoptera
- Suborder: Adephaga
- Family: Carabidae
- Tribe: Bembidiini
- Subtribe: Anillina
- Genus: Anillotarsus; Mateu, 1980
- Species: A. tetramerus

Binomial name
- Anillotarsus tetramerus Mateu, 1980

Genus of beetles

Anillotarsus is a genus of ground beetles in the family Carabidae. This genus has a single species, Anillotarsus tetramerus.
