= Tachysbembix =

Scientific classification
- Domain: Eukaryota
- Kingdom: Animalia
- Phylum: Arthropoda
- Class: Insecta
- Order: Coleoptera
- Suborder: Adephaga
- Family: Carabidae
- Subfamily: Trechinae
- Tribe: Bembidiini
- Subtribe: Tachyina
- Genus: Tachysbembix; Erwin, 2004

Genus of beetles

Tachysbembix is a genus of ground beetles in the family Carabidae. There are at least two described species in Tachysbembix.

== Species ==
These two species belong to the genus Tachysbembix:

- Tachysbembix sirena Erwin, 2004 (Costa Rica)
- Tachysbembix wendyporrasae Erwin, 2004 (Costa Rica)
