= Austranillus =

Scientific classification
- Domain: Eukaryota
- Kingdom: Animalia
- Phylum: Arthropoda
- Class: Insecta
- Order: Coleoptera
- Suborder: Adephaga
- Family: Carabidae
- Subfamily: Trechinae
- Tribe: Bembidiini
- Subtribe: Anillina
- Genus: Austranillus; Giachino, 2005

Genus of beetles

Austranillus is a genus of ground beetles in the family Carabidae. There are at least two described species in Austranillus.

== Species ==
These two species belong to the genus Austranillus:

- Austranillus jinayrianus Giachino; Eberhard & Perina, 2021
- Austranillus macleayi (Lea, 1906)
