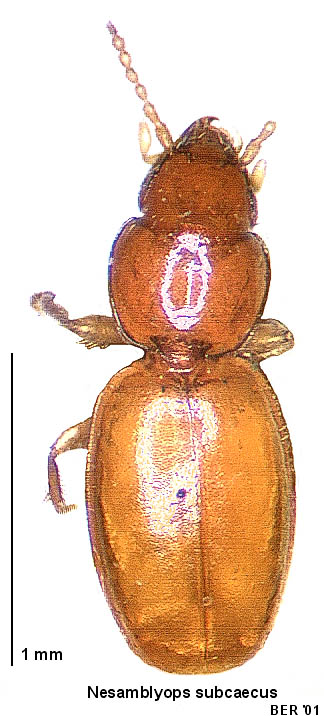
- Nesamblyops subcaecus

Scientific classification
- Kingdom: Animalia
- Phylum: Arthropoda
- Class: Insecta
- Order: Coleoptera
- Suborder: Adephaga
- Family: Carabidae
- Subfamily: Trechinae
- Tribe: Bembidiini
- Subtribe: Anillina
- Genus: Nesamblyops; Jeannel, 1937

= Nesamblyops =

Genus of beetles

Nesamblyops is a genus of beetles in the family Carabidae, containing the following species:

- Nesamblyops oreobius (Broun, 1893)
- Nesamblyops subcaecus (Sharp, 1886)
