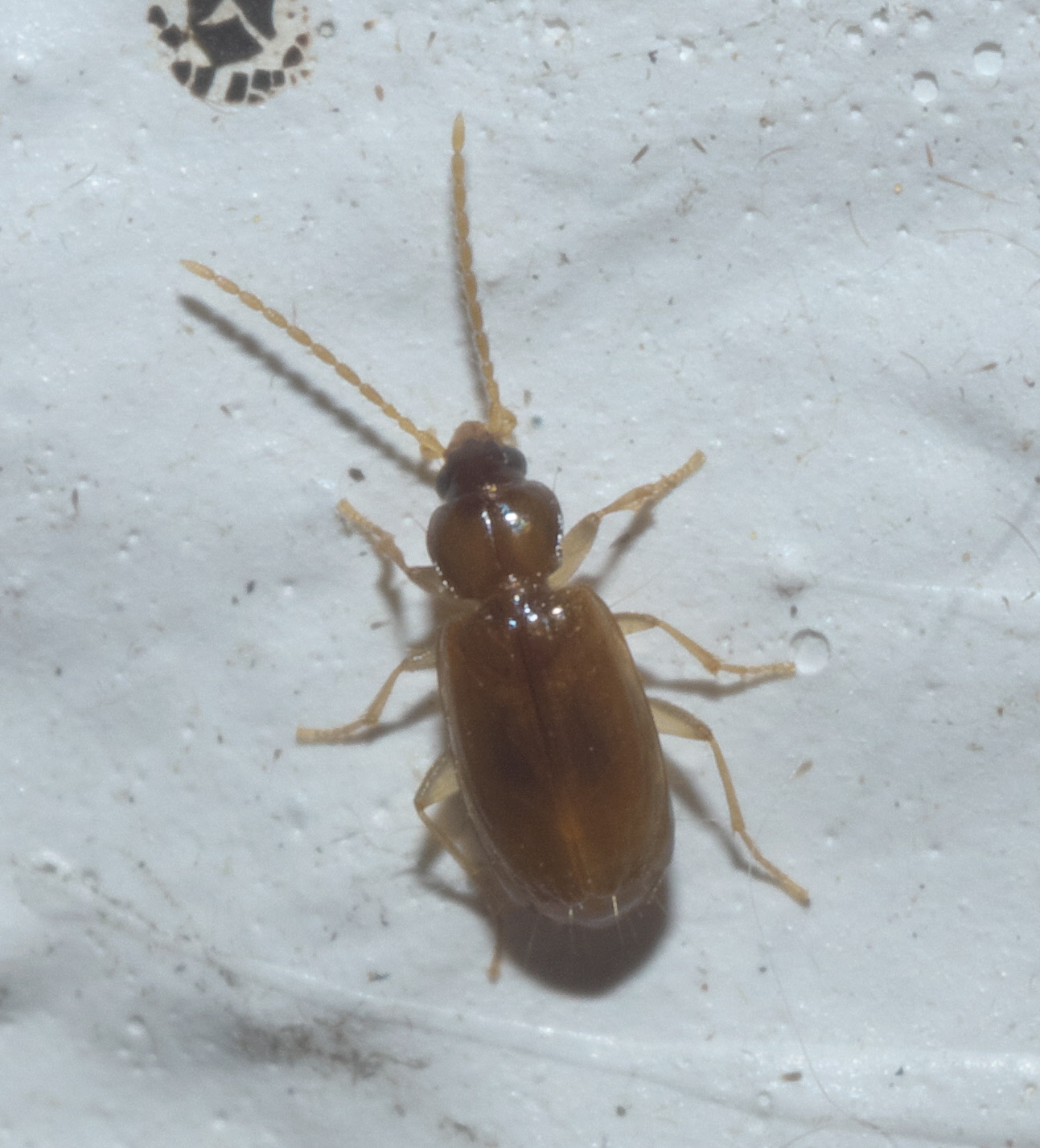

Scientific classification
- Kingdom: Animalia
- Phylum: Arthropoda
- Class: Insecta
- Order: Coleoptera
- Suborder: Adephaga
- Family: Carabidae
- Subfamily: Trechinae
- Tribe: Bembidiini
- Subtribe: Tachyina
- Genus: Micratopus; Casey, 1914

= Micratopus =

Genus of beetles

Micratopus is a genus of ground beetles in the family Carabidae. There are seven described species in the genus Micratopus.

== Species ==
These five species belong to the genus Micratopus:

- Micratopus aenescens (LeConte, 1848) (North America)
- Micratopus anaisae Lemaire, 2021 (Lesser Antilles)
- Micratopus erwini Lemaire, 2021 (Lesser Antilles)
- Micratopus exiguus (R.F.Sahlberg, 1844) (Brazil)
- Micratopus insularis Darlington, 1934 (Lesser Antilles)
- Micratopus parviceps Darlington, 1934 (Cuba)
- Micratopus withycombei Jeannel, 1932 (Lesser Antilles)
