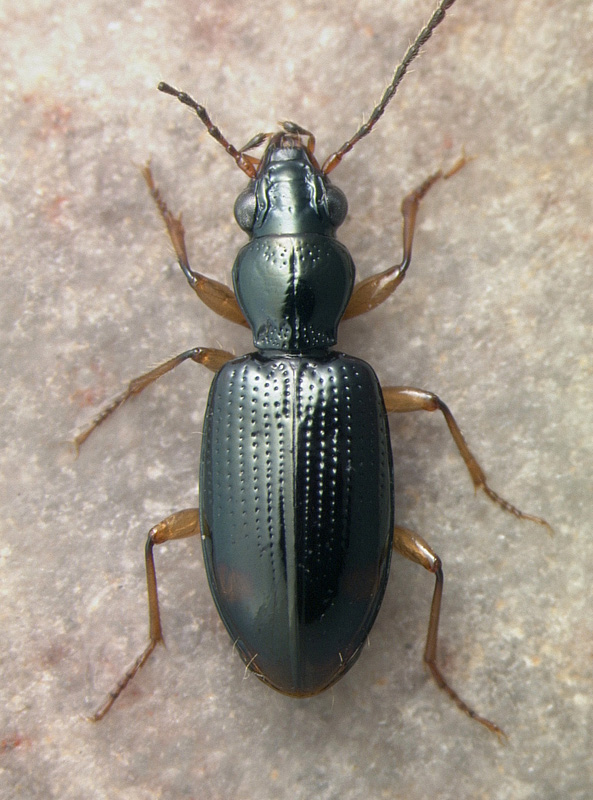
- Sinechostictus elongatus

Scientific classification
- Kingdom: Animalia
- Phylum: Arthropoda
- Class: Insecta
- Order: Coleoptera
- Suborder: Adephaga
- Family: Carabidae
- Subfamily: Trechinae
- Tribe: Bembidiini
- Subtribe: Bembidiina
- Genus: Sinechostictus; Motschulsky, 1864

Subgenera
- Pseudolimnaeum Kraatz, 1888; Sinechostictus Motschulsky, 1864

= Sinechostictus =

Genus of beetles

Sinechostictus is a genus of ground beetles in the family Carabidae. There are more than 30 described species in Sinechostictus.

== Species ==
These 32 species belong to the genus Sinechostictus:

- Sinechostictus afghanistanus (Jedlicka, 1968) (temperate Asia)
- Sinechostictus alesmetana (Toledano, 2008) (China)
- Sinechostictus arnosti (Nakane, 1978) (temperate Asia)
- Sinechostictus barbarus (G.Müller, 1918) (Africa)
- Sinechostictus cameroni (Andrewes, 1922) (Asia)
- Sinechostictus chuji (Jedlicka, 1951) (temperate Asia)
- Sinechostictus cribrum (Jacquelin du Val, 1852) (Africa and Europe)
- Sinechostictus cyprius (De Monte, 1949) (temperate Asia)
- Sinechostictus dahlii (Dejean, 1831) (Africa and Europe)
- Sinechostictus decoratus (Duftschmid, 1812) (Europe)
- Sinechostictus doderoi (Ganglbauer, 1891) (Europe)
- Sinechostictus elongatus (Dejean, 1831) (Europe)
- Sinechostictus emeishanicus Toledano, 2008 (China)
- Sinechostictus exaratus (Andrewes, 1924) (Asia)
- Sinechostictus frederici (G.Müller, 1918) (Africa and Europe)
- Sinechostictus galloisi (Netolitzky, 1938) (temperate Asia)
- Sinechostictus inustus (Jacquelin du Val, 1857) (Europe)
- Sinechostictus kosti (Matits, 1912) ((former) Yugoslavia)
- Sinechostictus kyushuensis (Habu, 1957) (Japan)
- Sinechostictus lederi (Reitter, 1888) (temperate Asia, North America, and Europe)
- Sinechostictus millerianus (Heyden, 1883) (Europe)
- Sinechostictus moschatus (Peyron, 1858) (temperate Asia, Europe, and North America)
- Sinechostictus multisulcatus (Reitter, 1890) (temperate Asia and North America)
- Sinechostictus muyupingi Toledano, 2008 (China)
- Sinechostictus nakabusei (Jedlicka, 1958) (temperate Asia)
- Sinechostictus nordmanni (Chaudoir, 1844) (temperate Asia and North America)
- Sinechostictus pendleburyi (Andrewes, 1931) (Indonesia and Borneo)
- Sinechostictus ruficornis (Sturm, 1825) (Europe)
- Sinechostictus solarii (G.Müller, 1918) (Europe)
- Sinechostictus stomoides (Dejean, 1831) (Europe)
- Sinechostictus tarsicus (Peyron, 1858) (Europe and temperate Asia)
- Sinechostictus wernermarggii Toledano, 2008 (China)
