= Hygranillus =

Scientific classification
- Domain: Eukaryota
- Kingdom: Animalia
- Phylum: Arthropoda
- Class: Insecta
- Order: Coleoptera
- Suborder: Adephaga
- Family: Carabidae
- Tribe: Bembidiini
- Subtribe: Anillina
- Genus: Hygranillus; B.Moore, 1980
- Species: H. kuscheli

Binomial name
- Hygranillus kuscheli B.Moore, 1980

Genus of beetles

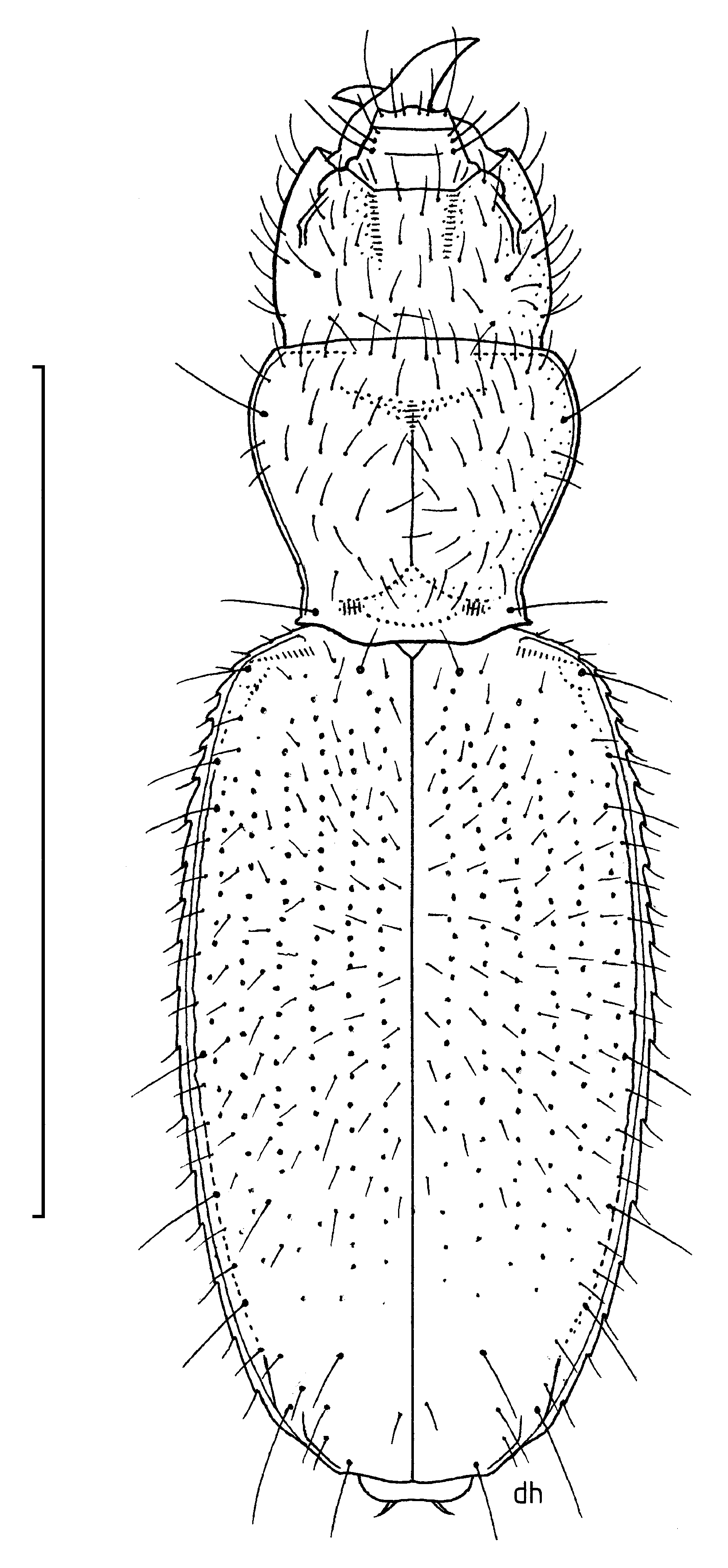

Hygranillus is a genus of ground beetles in the family Carabidae. This genus has a single species, Hygranillus kuscheli.
