= Elgonotyphlus =

Scientific classification
- Domain: Eukaryota
- Kingdom: Animalia
- Phylum: Arthropoda
- Class: Insecta
- Order: Coleoptera
- Suborder: Adephaga
- Family: Carabidae
- Tribe: Bembidiini
- Subtribe: Anillina
- Genus: Elgonotyphlus; Sciaky & Zaballos, 1993
- Species: E. zoiai

Binomial name
- Elgonotyphlus zoiai Sciaky & Zaballos, 1993

Genus of beetles

Elgonotyphlus is a genus of ground beetles in the family Carabidae. This genus has a single species, Elgonotyphlus zoiai.
