= Orzolina =

Scientific classification
- Domain: Eukaryota
- Kingdom: Animalia
- Phylum: Arthropoda
- Class: Insecta
- Order: Coleoptera
- Suborder: Adephaga
- Family: Carabidae
- Tribe: Bembidiini
- Subtribe: Bembidiina
- Genus: Orzolina; Machado, 1987
- Species: O. thalassophila

Binomial name
- Orzolina thalassophila Machado, 1987

Genus of beetles

Orzolina is a genus of ground beetles in the family Carabidae. This genus has a single species, Orzolina thalassophila. It is found in the Canary Islands.
