= Typhlonesiotes =

Scientific classification
- Domain: Eukaryota
- Kingdom: Animalia
- Phylum: Arthropoda
- Class: Insecta
- Order: Coleoptera
- Suborder: Adephaga
- Family: Carabidae
- Subfamily: Trechinae
- Tribe: Bembidiini
- Subtribe: Anillina
- Genus: Typhlonesiotes; Jeannel, 1937
- Species: T. swaluwenbergi

Binomial name
- Typhlonesiotes swaluwenbergi Jeannel, 1937

Genus of beetles

Typhlonesiotes is a genus of ground beetles in the family Carabidae. This genus has a single species, Typhlonesiotes swaluwenbergi. It is found in Hawaii.
