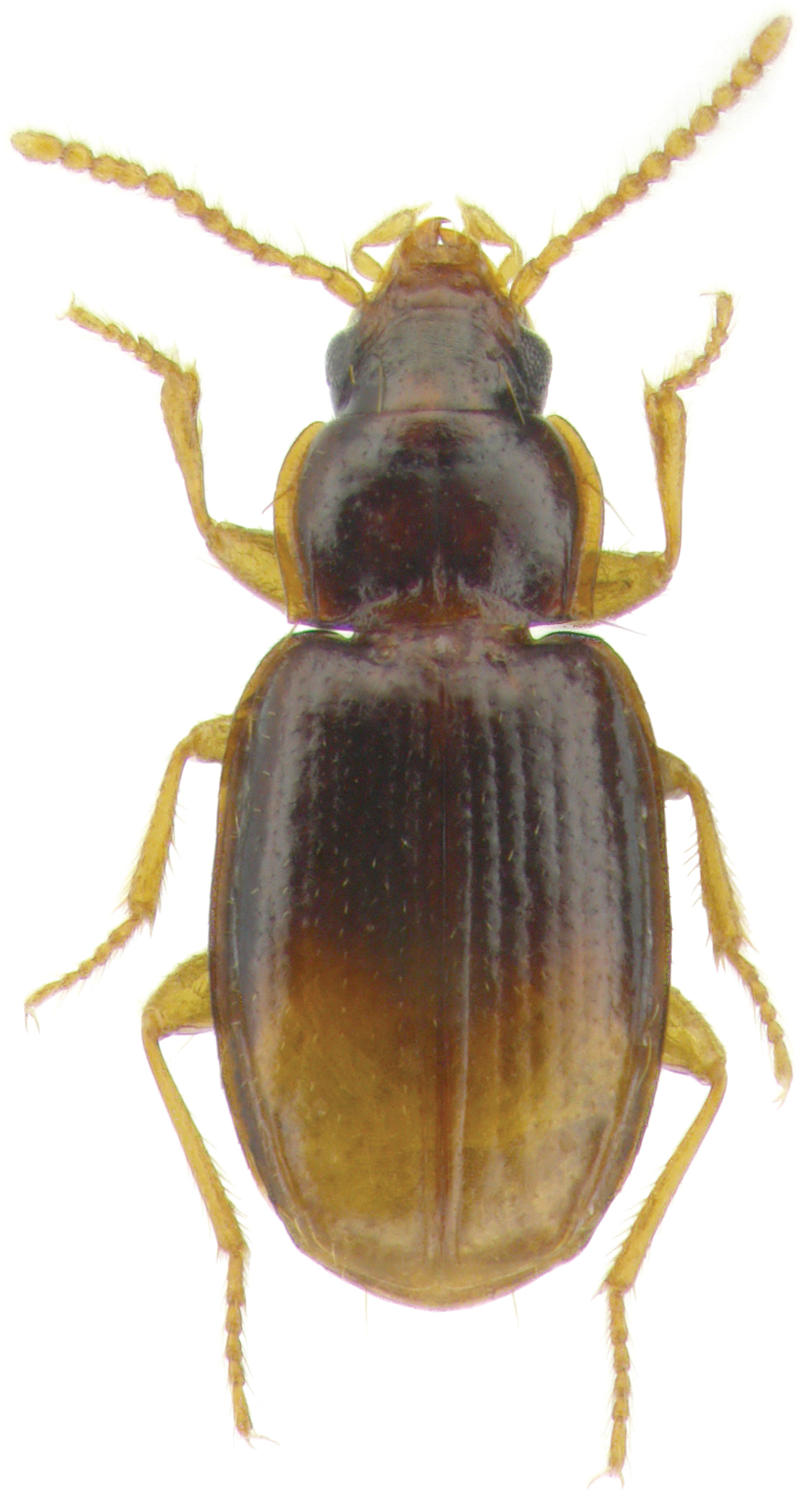

Scientific classification
- Domain: Eukaryota
- Kingdom: Animalia
- Phylum: Arthropoda
- Class: Insecta
- Order: Coleoptera
- Suborder: Adephaga
- Family: Carabidae
- Genus: Mioptachys
- Species: M. flavicauda

Binomial name
- Mioptachys flavicauda Say, 1823

= Mioptachys flavicauda =

Species of beetle

Mioptachys flavicauda is a ground beetle in the family Carabidae ("ground beetles"), in the suborder Adephaga ("ground and water beetles"). Mioptachys flavicauda is found in North America.
