= Pelocharis =

Scientific classification
- Domain: Eukaryota
- Kingdom: Animalia
- Phylum: Arthropoda
- Class: Insecta
- Order: Coleoptera
- Suborder: Adephaga
- Family: Carabidae
- Tribe: Bembidiini
- Subtribe: Anillina
- Genus: Pelocharis; Jeannel, 1960
- Species: P. remyi

Binomial name
- Pelocharis remyi Jeannel, 1960

Genus of beetles

Pelocharis is a genus of ground beetles in the family Carabidae. This genus has a single species, Pelocharis remyi. It is found in Sri Lanka.
