= Stylulus =

Scientific classification
- Domain: Eukaryota
- Kingdom: Animalia
- Phylum: Arthropoda
- Class: Insecta
- Order: Coleoptera
- Suborder: Adephaga
- Family: Carabidae
- Subfamily: Trechinae
- Tribe: Bembidiini
- Subtribe: Anillina
- Genus: Stylulus; L.Schaufuss, 1882

Subgenera
- Stylulites Jeannel, 1963; Stylulus L.Schaufuss, 1882

Genus of beetles

Stylulus is a genus of ground beetles in the family Carabidae. There are at least three described species in Stylulus.

== Species ==
These three species belong to the genus Stylulus:

- Stylulus isabelae Giachino & Sciaky, 2003 (the Lesser Antilles)
- Stylulus nasutus L.Schaufuss, 1882 (the Caribbean Sea)
- Stylulus plaumanni (Jeannel, 1963) (South America)
