= Argiloborus =

Scientific classification
- Domain: Eukaryota
- Kingdom: Animalia
- Phylum: Arthropoda
- Class: Insecta
- Order: Coleoptera
- Suborder: Adephaga
- Family: Carabidae
- Subfamily: Trechinae
- Tribe: Bembidiini
- Subtribe: Anillina
- Genus: Argiloborus; Jeannel, 1937

Subgenera
- Argilobius Jeannel, 1963; Argiloborus Jeannel, 1937

Genus of beetles

Argiloborus is a genus of ground beetles in the family Carabidae. There are more than 50 described species in Argiloborus.

== Species ==
These 51 species belong to the genus Argiloborus:

- Argiloborus agostii Giachino, 2003
- Argiloborus alutaceus (Jeannel, 1957)
- Argiloborus amblygonus Jeannel, 1960
- Argiloborus ambreanus Jeannel, 1963
- Argiloborus andriai Jeannel, 1963
- Argiloborus andringitrae Giachino, 2008
- Argiloborus angustus Jeannel, 1963
- Argiloborus ankaratrae Jeannel, 1957
- Argiloborus balinensis Giachino, 2003
- Argiloborus besucheti Giachino, 2003
- Argiloborus brevicollis Jeannel, 1958
- Argiloborus brevis Jeannel, 1963
- Argiloborus bulirschi Giachino, 2008
- Argiloborus burckhardti Giachino, 2003
- Argiloborus ceylanicus Jeannel, 1960
- Argiloborus curtus Jeannel, 1960
- Argiloborus fianarantsoae Giachino, 2008
- Argiloborus fisheri Giachino, 2008
- Argiloborus furcatus Giachino, 2008
- Argiloborus gracilis Jeannel, 1960
- Argiloborus huberi Giachino, 2003
- Argiloborus imerinae Jeannel, 1957
- Argiloborus indicus Jeannel, 1960
- Argiloborus indonesianus Giachino, 2003
- Argiloborus insularis Jeannel, 1957
- Argiloborus janaki Giachino, 2008
- Argiloborus javanicus Giachino, 2003
- Argiloborus laticollis Jeannel, 1963
- Argiloborus loebli Giachino, 2003
- Argiloborus malaysianus Giachino, 2003
- Argiloborus monticola Jeannel, 1960
- Argiloborus moraveci Giachino, 2008
- Argiloborus murphyi Mateu, 1969
- Argiloborus nativitatis Giachino, 2016
- Argiloborus pauliani (Jeannel, 1952)
- Argiloborus perineti Giachino, 2008
- Argiloborus planatus Jeannel, 1963
- Argiloborus praslinicus Giachino, 2015
- Argiloborus punctaticollis Jeannel, 1963
- Argiloborus pusillus Jeannel, 1958
- Argiloborus quadraticollis (Jeannel, 1957)
- Argiloborus remyi Jeannel, 1958
- Argiloborus riedeli Giachino, 2001
- Argiloborus roberti Giachino, 2003
- Argiloborus scotti Jeannel, 1937
- Argiloborus sogai Jeannel, 1963
- Argiloborus stricticollis Jeannel, 1960
- Argiloborus tenuis (Jeannel, 1952)
- Argiloborus thailandicus Zaballos, 1988
- Argiloborus thoracicus Jeannel, 1957
- Argiloborus vadoni (Jeannel, 1952)
