= Caecoparvus =

Scientific classification
- Domain: Eukaryota
- Kingdom: Animalia
- Phylum: Arthropoda
- Class: Insecta
- Order: Coleoptera
- Suborder: Adephaga
- Family: Carabidae
- Subfamily: Trechinae
- Tribe: Bembidiini
- Subtribe: Anillina
- Genus: Caecoparvus; Jeannel, 1937

Genus of beetles

Caecoparvus is a genus of ground beetles in the family Carabidae. There are more than 20 described species in Caecoparvus.

== Species ==
These 23 species belong to the genus Caecoparvus:

- Caecoparvus achaiae Giachino & Vailati, 2011
- Caecoparvus anatolicus (Jedlicka, 1968)
- Caecoparvus arcadicus (G.Müller, 1935)
- Caecoparvus assingi Giachino & Vailati, 2019
- Caecoparvus berrutii Giachino & Vailati, 2011
- Caecoparvus bialookii Giachino & Vailati, 2019
- Caecoparvus brachati Giachino & Vailati, 2019
- Caecoparvus daccordii Giachino & Vailati, 2011
- Caecoparvus hercules Giachino & Vailati, 2011
- Caecoparvus karavae Giachino & Vailati, 2011
- Caecoparvus leonidae Giachino & Vailati, 2011
- Caecoparvus lompei Giachino & Vailati, 2011
- Caecoparvus lydiae Giachino & Vailati, 2019
- Caecoparvus marchesii Giachino & Vailati, 2011
- Caecoparvus meschniggi (Winkler, 1936)
- Caecoparvus meybohmi Giachino & Vailati, 2019
- Caecoparvus muelleri (Ganglbauer, 1900)
- Caecoparvus parnassicus (Breit, 1923)
- Caecoparvus pavesii Giachino & Vailati, 2011
- Caecoparvus sciakyi Giachino & Vailati, 2011
- Caecoparvus tauricus Giachino & Vailati, 2019
- Caecoparvus tokatensis (Vigna Taglianti, 1976)
- Caecoparvus vavrai Giachino & Vailati, 2019
