= Mexanillus =

Scientific classification
- Domain: Eukaryota
- Kingdom: Animalia
- Phylum: Arthropoda
- Class: Insecta
- Order: Coleoptera
- Suborder: Adephaga
- Family: Carabidae
- Tribe: Bembidiini
- Subtribe: Anillina
- Genus: Mexanillus; Vigna Taglianti, 1973
- Species: M. sbordonii

Binomial name
- Mexanillus sbordonii Vigna Taglianti, 1973

Genus of beetles

Mexanillus is a genus of ground beetles in the family Carabidae. This genus has a single species, Mexanillus sbordonii.
