= Dicropterus =

Scientific classification
- Domain: Eukaryota
- Kingdom: Animalia
- Phylum: Arthropoda
- Class: Insecta
- Order: Coleoptera
- Suborder: Adephaga
- Family: Carabidae
- Tribe: Bembidiini
- Subtribe: Anillina
- Genus: Dicropterus; Ehlers, 1883
- Species: D. brevipennis

Binomial name
- Dicropterus brevipennis (J.Frivaldszky, 1879)

Genus of beetles

Dicropterus is a genus of ground beetles in the family Carabidae. This genus has a single species, Dicropterus brevipennis.
