= Bhutanillus =

Scientific classification
- Domain: Eukaryota
- Kingdom: Animalia
- Phylum: Arthropoda
- Class: Insecta
- Order: Coleoptera
- Suborder: Adephaga
- Family: Carabidae
- Subfamily: Trechinae
- Tribe: Bembidiini
- Subtribe: Anillina
- Genus: Bhutanillus; M.E.Schmid, 1975

Genus of beetles

Bhutanillus is a genus of ground beetles in the family Carabidae. There are at least two described species in Bhutanillus.

== Species ==
These two species belong to the genus Bhutanillus:

- Bhutanillus pygmaeus M.E.Schmid, 1975
- Bhutanillus yodai (Jedlicka, 1965)
