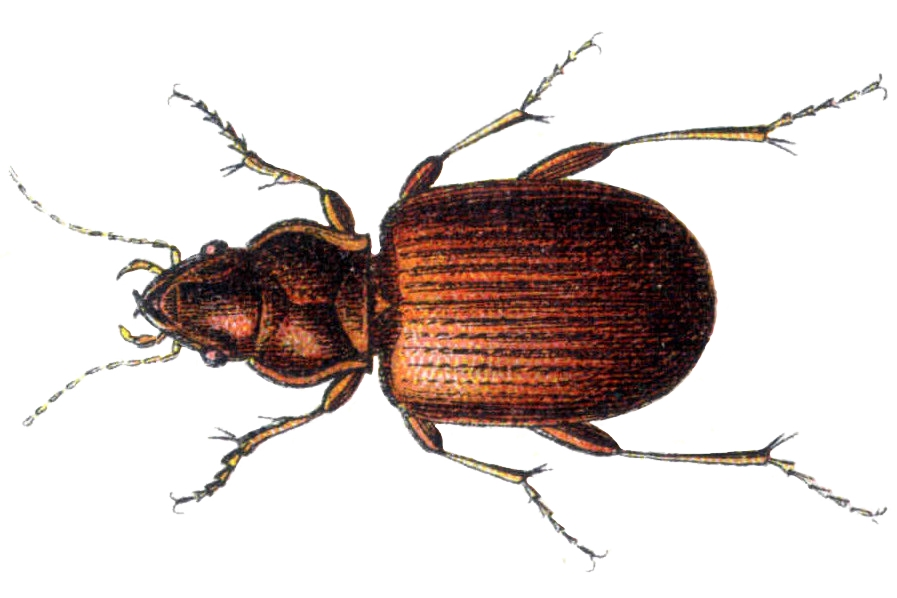

Scientific classification
- Domain: Eukaryota
- Kingdom: Animalia
- Phylum: Arthropoda
- Class: Insecta
- Order: Coleoptera
- Suborder: Adephaga
- Family: Carabidae
- Genus: Porotachys
- Species: P. bisulcatus

Binomial name
- Porotachys bisulcatus (Nicolai, 1822)

= Porotachys bisulcatus =

Species of beetle

Porotachys bisulcatus is a species of ground beetle in the family Carabidae. It is found in North America, Europe, Africa, and temperate Asia.
