= Erwiniana =

Scientific classification
- Domain: Eukaryota
- Kingdom: Animalia
- Phylum: Arthropoda
- Class: Insecta
- Order: Coleoptera
- Suborder: Adephaga
- Family: Carabidae
- Subfamily: Trechinae
- Tribe: Bembidiini
- Subtribe: Xystosomina
- Genus: Erwiniana; Paulsen & A.Smith, 2003

Synonyms
- Batesiana Erwin, 1994

Genus of beetles

Erwiniana is a genus in the ground beetle family Carabidae. There are more than 50 described species in Erwiniana, found in Central and South America.

== Species ==
These 57 species belong to the genus Erwiniana:

- Erwiniana aetholia (Erwin, 1973) (Bolivia)
- Erwiniana alticola (Erwin, 1994) (Colombia)
- Erwiniana am (Erwin, 1994) (Peru)
- Erwiniana ampliata (Bates, 1884) (Panama, Costa Rica)
- Erwiniana anchicaya (Erwin, 1994) (Colombia)
- Erwiniana angustia (Erwin, 1994) (Peru)
- Erwiniana anterocostis (Erwin, 1973) (Costa Rica)
- Erwiniana apicisulcata (Erwin, 1973) (Brazil)
- Erwiniana baeza (Erwin, 1994) (Ecuador)
- Erwiniana batesi (Erwin, 1973) (Brazil)
- Erwiniana belti (Bates, 1878)
- Erwiniana bisulcifrons (Erwin, 1973) (Brazil)
- Erwiniana chiriboga (Erwin, 1994) (Ecuador)
- Erwiniana crassa (Erwin, 1994) (Peru)
- Erwiniana dannyi (Erwin, 1994) (Ecuador)
- Erwiniana depressisculptilis (Erwin, 1994) (Ecuador)
- Erwiniana equanegrei (Erwin, 1994) (Ecuador)
- Erwiniana esheje (Erwin, 1994) (Peru)
- Erwiniana eugeneae (Erwin, 1994) (Peru)
- Erwiniana exigupunctata (Erwin, 1994) (Peru)
- Erwiniana foveosculptilis (Erwin, 1994) (Brazil)
- Erwiniana grossipunctata (Erwin, 1973) (Brazil)
- Erwiniana grutii (Bates, 1871) (Central and South America)
- Erwiniana hamatilis (Erwin, 1994) (Ecuador)
- Erwiniana henryi (Erwin, 1994) (Ecuador)
- Erwiniana hilaris (Bates, 1871)
- Erwiniana huacamayas (Erwin, 1994) (Ecuador)
- Erwiniana indetecticostis (Erwin, 1994) (Ecuador)
- Erwiniana iris (Erwin, 1973) (Bolivia, Peru)
- Erwiniana irisculptilis (Erwin, 1994) (Ecuador)
- Erwiniana jacupiranga (Erwin, 1994) (Brazil)
- Erwiniana jefe (Erwin, 1994) (Panama)
- Erwiniana manusculptilis (Erwin, 1994) (Peru)
- Erwiniana misahualli (Erwin, 1994) (Ecuador)
- Erwiniana negrei (Erwin, 1973) (Venezuela)
- Erwiniana nigripalpis (Erwin, 1973) (Panama)
- Erwiniana notesheje (Erwin, 1994) (Peru)
- Erwiniana notparkeri (Erwin, 1994) (Colombia)
- Erwiniana nox (Erwin, 1994) (Ecuador)
- Erwiniana ovatula (Bates, 1871) (Brazil)
- Erwiniana para (Erwin, 1994) (Brazil)
- Erwiniana parainsularis (Erwin, 1973) (Colombia, Venezuela, Hispaniola)
- Erwiniana parapara (Erwin, 1994) (Brazil)
- Erwiniana parkeri (Erwin, 1994) (Peru)
- Erwiniana pfunorum (Erwin, 1994) (Peru)
- Erwiniana protosculptilis (Erwin, 1994) (Peru)
- Erwiniana punctisculptilis (Erwin, 1994) (Peru)
- Erwiniana quadrata (Erwin, 1994) (Peru)
- Erwiniana rosebudae (Erwin, 1994) (Ecuador)
- Erwiniana samiria (Erwin, 1994) (Peru)
- Erwiniana sculpticollis (Bates, 1871) (Brazil)
- Erwiniana seriata (Erwin, 1973) (Brazil)
- Erwiniana strigosa (Bates, 1871) (Brazil)
- Erwiniana sublaevis (Bates, 1882) (Panama, Costa Rica)
- Erwiniana sulcicostis (Bates, 1882) (Panama)
- Erwiniana villiersi (Perrault, 1984) (Brazil)
- Erwiniana wygo (Erwin, 1994) (Colombia)
