= Costitachys =

Scientific classification
- Domain: Eukaryota
- Kingdom: Animalia
- Phylum: Arthropoda
- Class: Insecta
- Order: Coleoptera
- Suborder: Adephaga
- Family: Carabidae
- Subfamily: Trechinae
- Tribe: Bembidiini
- Subtribe: Tachyina
- Genus: Costitachys; Erwin, 1974

Genus of beetles

Costitachys is a genus of ground beetles in the family Carabidae. There are at least two described species in Costitachys.

== Species ==
These two species belong to the genus Costitachys:

- Costitachys inusitatus Erwin, 1974 (Brazil)
- Costitachys tena Erwin & Kavanaugh, 2007
