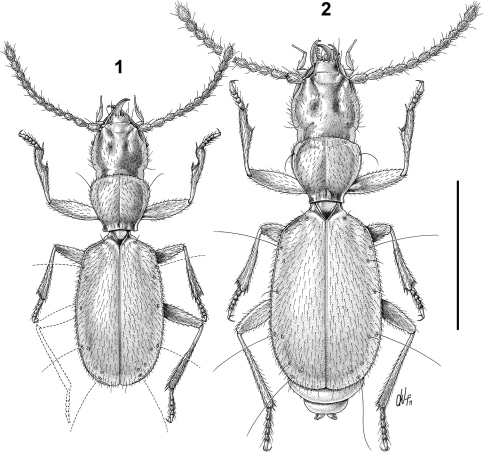

Scientific classification
- Domain: Eukaryota
- Kingdom: Animalia
- Phylum: Arthropoda
- Class: Insecta
- Order: Coleoptera
- Suborder: Adephaga
- Family: Carabidae
- Tribe: Bembidiini
- Subtribe: Lovriciina
- Genus: Paralovricia; Giachino et al., 2011
- Species: P. beroni

Binomial name
- Paralovricia beroni Giachino et al., 2011

= Paralovricia =

Genus of beetles

Paralovricia is a genus of ground beetles in the family Carabidae. This genus has a single species, Paralovricia beroni. It is found in Bulgaria.
