= Carayonites =

Scientific classification
- Domain: Eukaryota
- Kingdom: Animalia
- Phylum: Arthropoda
- Class: Insecta
- Order: Coleoptera
- Suborder: Adephaga
- Family: Carabidae
- Tribe: Bembidiini
- Subtribe: Anillina
- Genus: Carayonites; Bruneau de Miré, 1986
- Species: C. insignis

Binomial name
- Carayonites insignis Bruneau de Miré, 1986

Genus of beetles

Carayonites is a genus of ground beetles in the family Carabidae. This genus has a single species, Carayonites insignis.
