= Anillopsidius =

Scientific classification
- Domain: Eukaryota
- Kingdom: Animalia
- Phylum: Arthropoda
- Class: Insecta
- Order: Coleoptera
- Suborder: Adephaga
- Family: Carabidae
- Tribe: Bembidiini
- Subtribe: Anillina
- Genus: Anillopsidius; Coiffait, 1969
- Species: A. atlasicus

Binomial name
- Anillopsidius atlasicus Coiffait, 1969

Genus of beetles

Anillopsidius is a genus of ground beetles in the family Carabidae. This genus has a single species, Anillopsidius atlasicus.
