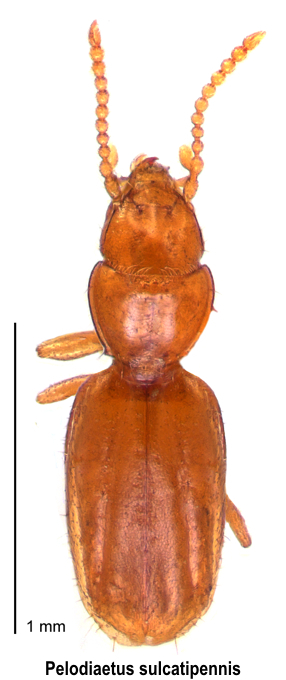
- Pelodiaetus sulcatipennis

Scientific classification
- Domain: Eukaryota
- Kingdom: Animalia
- Phylum: Arthropoda
- Class: Insecta
- Order: Coleoptera
- Suborder: Adephaga
- Family: Carabidae
- Subfamily: Trechinae
- Tribe: Bembidiini
- Subtribe: Anillina
- Genus: Pelodiaetus; Jeannel, 1937

= Pelodiaetus =

Genus of beetles

Pelodiaetus is a genus of ground beetles in the family Carabidae. There are at least two described species in Pelodiaetus, found in New Zealand.

== Species ==
These two species belong to the genus Pelodiaetus:

- Pelodiaetus nunni Sokolov, 2019
- Pelodiaetus sulcatipennis Jeannel, 1937
