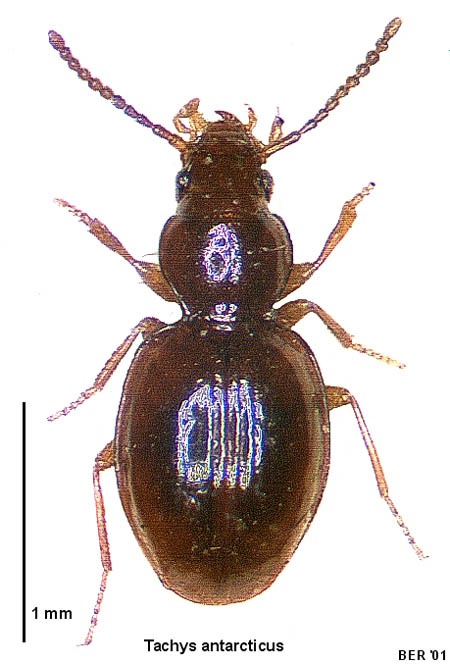
- Tachys antarcticus, numera Kiwitachys antarcticus, fotografi av Birgit E. Rhode, Landcare Research New Zealand Ltd.

Scientific classification
- Domain: Eukaryota
- Kingdom: Animalia
- Phylum: Arthropoda
- Class: Insecta
- Order: Coleoptera
- Suborder: Adephaga
- Family: Carabidae
- Subfamily: Trechinae
- Tribe: Bembidiini
- Subtribe: Tachyina
- Genus: Kiwitachys; Larochelle & Larivière, 2007

= Kiwitachys =

Genus of beetles

Kiwitachys is a genus of ground beetles in the family Carabidae. There are at least two described species in Kiwitachys, found in New Zealand.

== Species ==
These two species belong to the genus Kiwitachys:

- Kiwitachys antarcticus (Bates, 1874)
- Kiwitachys latipennis (Sharp, 1886)
