= Inpa =

Scientific classification
- Domain: Eukaryota
- Kingdom: Animalia
- Phylum: Arthropoda
- Class: Insecta
- Order: Coleoptera
- Suborder: Adephaga
- Family: Carabidae
- Tribe: Bembidiini
- Subtribe: Xystosomina
- Genus: Inpa; Erwin, 1978
- Species: I. psydroides

Binomial name
- Inpa psydroides Erwin, 1978

Genus of beetles

Inpa is a genus of ground beetles in the family Carabidae. This genus has a single species, Inpa psydroides. It is found in Brazil.
