= Mystroceridius =

Scientific classification
- Domain: Eukaryota
- Kingdom: Animalia
- Phylum: Arthropoda
- Class: Insecta
- Order: Coleoptera
- Suborder: Adephaga
- Family: Carabidae
- Subfamily: Trechinae
- Tribe: Bembidiini
- Subtribe: Anillina
- Genus: Mystroceridius; Reichardt, 1972

Genus of beetles

Mystroceridius is a genus of ground beetles in the family Carabidae. There are at least two described species in Mystroceridius, found in the Galapagos.

== Species ==
These two species belong to the genus Mystroceridius:

- Mystroceridius basilewskyi Reichardt, 1972
- Mystroceridius wittmeri Franz, 1978
