= Nothanillus =

Scientific classification
- Kingdom: Animalia
- Phylum: Arthropoda
- Class: Insecta
- Order: Coleoptera
- Suborder: Adephaga
- Family: Carabidae
- Subfamily: Trechinae
- Tribe: Bembidiini
- Subtribe: Anillina
- Genus: Nothanillus; Jeannel, 1962

Genus of beetles

Nothanillus is a genus of ground beetles in the family Carabidae. There are at least two described species in Nothanillus, found in Chile.

== Species ==
These two species belong to the genus Nothanillus:

- Nothanillus germaini Jeannel, 1962
- Nothanillus luisae Bonniard de Saludo, 1970
