= Caecidium =

Scientific classification
- Domain: Eukaryota
- Kingdom: Animalia
- Phylum: Arthropoda
- Class: Insecta
- Order: Coleoptera
- Suborder: Adephaga
- Family: Carabidae
- Subfamily: Trechinae
- Tribe: Bembidiini
- Subtribe: Bembidiina
- Genus: Caecidium; Ueno, 1971

Genus of beetles

Caecidium is a genus of ground beetles in the family Carabidae. There are at least two described species in Caecidium, found in Japan.

== Species ==
These two species belong to the genus Caecidium:

- Caecidium trechomorphum Ueno, 1971
- Caecidium yasudai Ueno, 1972
