= Geocharis (beetle) =

Scientific classification
- Domain: Eukaryota
- Kingdom: Animalia
- Phylum: Arthropoda
- Class: Insecta
- Order: Coleoptera
- Suborder: Adephaga
- Family: Carabidae
- Subfamily: Trechinae
- Tribe: Bembidiini
- Subtribe: Anillina
- Genus: Geocharis; Ehlers, 1883

Genus of beetles

Geocharis is a genus of ground beetles in the family Carabidae. There are more than 40 described species in Geocharis.

== Species ==
These 44 species belong to the genus Geocharis:

- Geocharis amicorum Zaballos, 1998
- Geocharis antheroi A.Serrano & Aguiar, 2011
- Geocharis auroque A.Serrano & Aguiar, 2019
- Geocharis barcorabelo A.Serrano & Aguiar, 2011
- Geocharis bifenestrata Zaballos, 2005
- Geocharis bivari A.Serrano & Aguiar, 2004
- Geocharis boieiroi A.Serrano & Aguiar, 2001
- Geocharis capelai A.Serrano & Aguiar, 2013
- Geocharis caseiroi A.Serrano & Aguiar, 2013
- Geocharis coiffaiti A.Serrano & Aguiar, 2006
- Geocharis cordubensis (Dieck, 1869)
- Geocharis elegantula Antoine, 1962
- Geocharis estremozensis A.Serrano & Aguiar, 2003
- Geocharis falcipenis Zaballos & Jeanne, 1987
- Geocharis femoralis Coiffait, 1969
- Geocharis fenestrata Zaballos, 2005
- Geocharis fermini A.Serrano & Aguiar, 2004
- Geocharis grandolensis A.Serrano & Aguiar, 2000
- Geocharis iborensis Zaballos, 1990
- Geocharis julianae Zaballos, 1989
- Geocharis juncoi Zaballos, 2005
- Geocharis korbi (Ganglbauer, 1900)
- Geocharis leoni Zaballos, 1998
- Geocharis liberorum Zaballos, 2005
- Geocharis margaridae A.Serrano & Aguiar, 2013
- Geocharis massinissa (Dieck, 1869)
- Geocharis monfortensis A.Serrano & Aguiar, 2000
- Geocharis montecristoi Zaballos, 2005
- Geocharis moscatelus A.Serrano & Aguiar, 2001
- Geocharis mussardi Antoine, 1962
- Geocharis notolampros Zaballos, 2005
- Geocharis noudari A.Serrano & Aguiar, 2013
- Geocharis olisipensis (Schatzmayr, 1936)
- Geocharis portalegrensis A.Serrano & Aguiar, 2001
- Geocharis quartaui A.Serrano & Aguiar, 2004
- Geocharis raclinae Antoine, 1962
- Geocharis rodriguesi A.Serrano & Aguiar, 2008
- Geocharis rotundata J.Serrano & Aguiar, 2006
- Geocharis ruiztapiadori Zaballos, 1996
- Geocharis sacarraoi A.Serrano & Aguiar, 2003
- Geocharis saldanhai A.Serrano & Aguiar, 2001
- Geocharis sebastianae J.Serrano & Aguiar, 2006
- Geocharis submersa A.Serrano & Aguiar, 2003
- Geocharis testatetrafoveata Zaballos, 2005
