= Tachyta falli =

Scientific classification
- Domain: Eukaryota
- Kingdom: Animalia
- Phylum: Arthropoda
- Class: Insecta
- Order: Coleoptera
- Suborder: Adephaga
- Family: Carabidae
- Genus: Tachyta
- Species: T. falli

Binomial name
- Tachyta falli (Hayward, 1900)

Species of beetle

Tachyta falli is a species of ground beetle in the family Carabidae. It is found in North America.
