= Microdipnodes =

Scientific classification
- Domain: Eukaryota
- Kingdom: Animalia
- Phylum: Arthropoda
- Class: Insecta
- Order: Coleoptera
- Suborder: Adephaga
- Family: Carabidae
- Tribe: Bembidiini
- Subtribe: Anillina
- Genus: Microdipnodes; Basilewsky, 1960
- Species: M. tshuapanus

Binomial name
- Microdipnodes tshuapanus Basilewsky, 1960

Genus of beetles

Microdipnodes is a genus of ground beetles in the family Carabidae. This genus has a single species, Microdipnodes tshuapanus.
