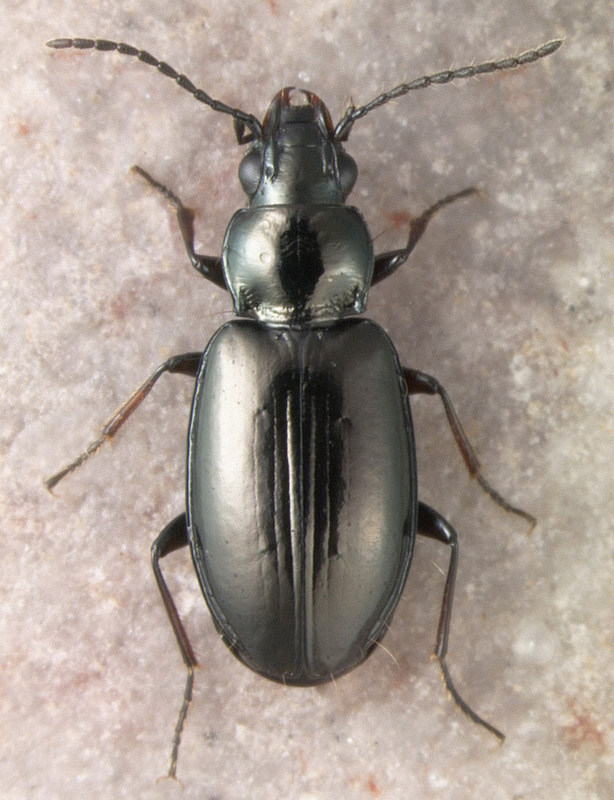
- Lionepha osculans (Bembidion osculans)

Scientific classification
- Kingdom: Animalia
- Phylum: Arthropoda
- Class: Insecta
- Order: Coleoptera
- Suborder: Adephaga
- Family: Carabidae
- Subfamily: Trechinae
- Tribe: Bembidiini
- Subtribe: Bembidiina
- Genus: Lionepha; Casey, 1918

Type species
- Bembidion erasum LeConte, 1859

Species
- 11, see text.

= Lionepha =

Genus of beetles

Lionepha is a genus of ground beetles in the family Carabidae. There are about 11 described species in Lionepha. Members of the genus are found in western North America from Alaska in the north, south to southern California and east to Colorado. The genus is morphologically similar to Bembidion, however they are genetically quite distinct.

== Species ==
There are currently 11 described species in Lionepha divided into two groups:

L. erasa group:

- Lionepha australerasa Maddison, 2020
- Lionepha casta (Casey, 1918)
- Lionepha disjuncta (Lindroth, 1963)
- Lionepha erasa (LeConte, 1859)
- Lionepha kavanaughi Maddison, 2020
- Lionepha lindrothi Maddison & Sproul, 2020
- Lionepha probata (Casey, 1918)

L. osculans group:

- Lionepha osculans (Casey, 1918)
- Lionepha pseudoerasa (Lindroth, 1963)
- Lionepha sequoiae (Lindroth, 1963)
- Lionepha tuulukwa Maddison, 2020

== Synonyms ==
The following is a list of selected synonyms:

Bembidion brumale Casey, 1918 is a synonym of Lionepha casta.

Lionepha erasa has multiple junior synonyms:

- Lionepha chintimini (Erwin & Kavanaugh, 1981)
- Lionepha lindrothella (Erwin & Kavanaugh, 1981)
- Lionepha lummi (Erwin & Kavanaugh, 1981)

Additionally, many species were formerly placed in the genus Bembidion, but later moved to Lionepha on the basis of genetic evidence.
