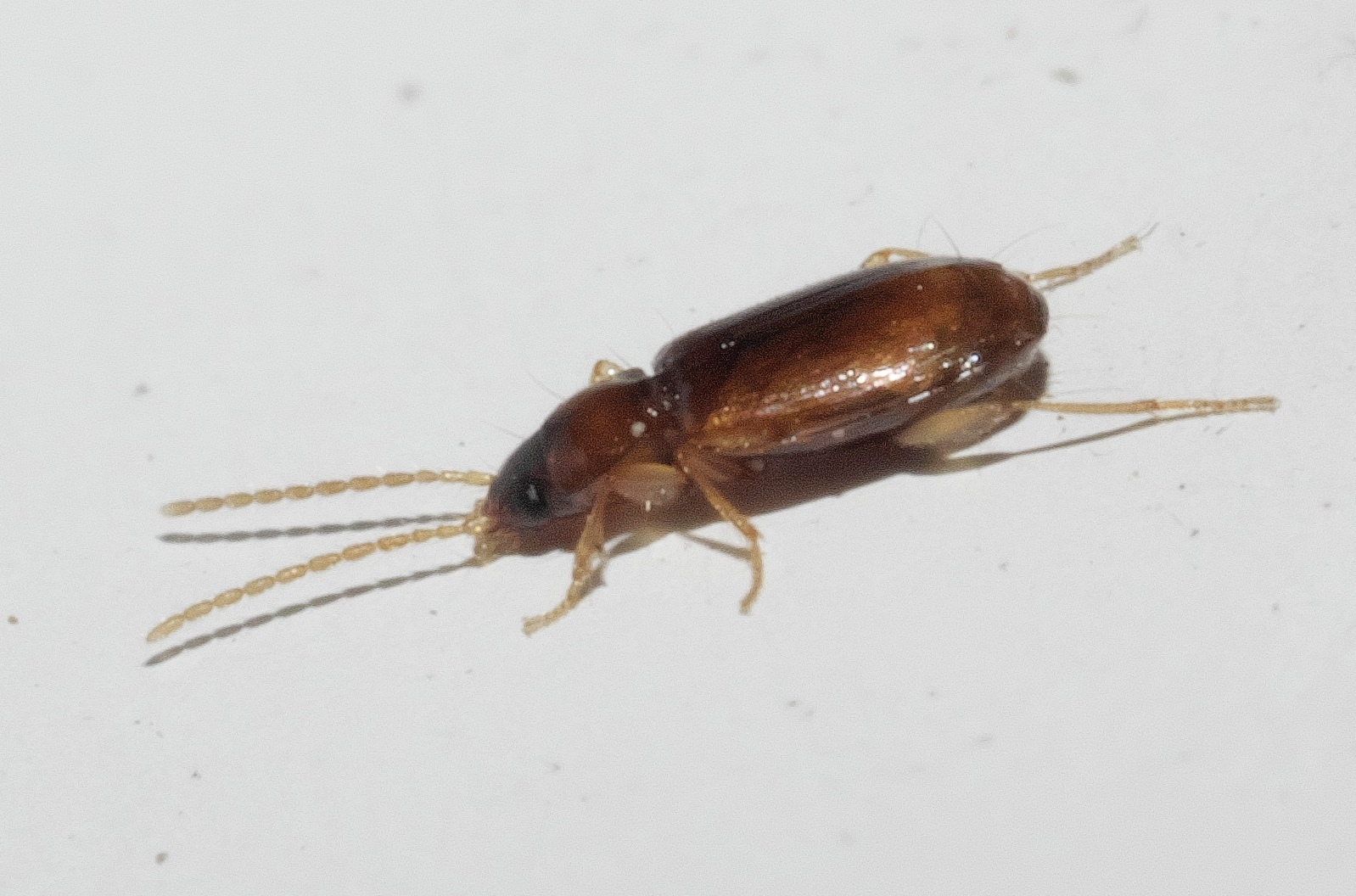
- Micratopus aenescens, Oklahoma

Scientific classification
- Domain: Eukaryota
- Kingdom: Animalia
- Phylum: Arthropoda
- Class: Insecta
- Order: Coleoptera
- Suborder: Adephaga
- Family: Carabidae
- Genus: Micratopus
- Species: M. aenescens

Binomial name
- Micratopus aenescens (LeConte, 1848)

= Micratopus aenescens =

Species of beetle

Micratopus aenescens is a species of ground beetle in the family Carabidae. It is found in North America.
