= Orthotyphlus =

Scientific classification
- Domain: Eukaryota
- Kingdom: Animalia
- Phylum: Arthropoda
- Class: Insecta
- Order: Coleoptera
- Suborder: Adephaga
- Family: Carabidae
- Tribe: Bembidiini
- Subtribe: Anillina
- Genus: Orthotyphlus; Mateu & Zaballos, 1998
- Species: O. franzi

Binomial name
- Orthotyphlus franzi (Zaballos & Mateu, 1998)

Synonyms
- Neotyphlus

Genus of beetles

Orthotyphlus is a genus of ground beetles in the family Carabidae. This genus has a single species, Orthotyphlus franzi. It is found in New Caledonia.
