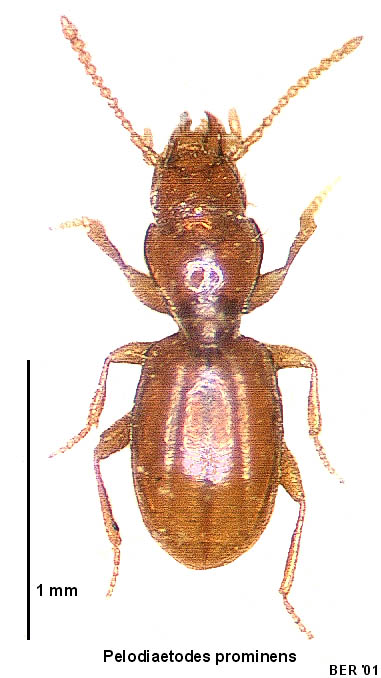
- Pelodiaetodes prominens

Scientific classification
- Domain: Eukaryota
- Kingdom: Animalia
- Phylum: Arthropoda
- Class: Insecta
- Order: Coleoptera
- Suborder: Adephaga
- Family: Carabidae
- Subfamily: Trechinae
- Tribe: Bembidiini
- Subtribe: Anillina
- Genus: Pelodiaetodes; Moore, 1980

Subgenera
- Monosetodes Sokolov, 2015; Pelodiaetodes B.Moore, 1980

= Pelodiaetodes =

Genus of beetles

Pelodiaetodes is a genus of ground beetles in the family Carabidae. There are about five described species in Pelodiaetodes, found in New Zealand.

== Species ==
These five species belong to the genus Pelodiaetodes:

- Pelodiaetodes aldermensis Sokolov, 2015
- Pelodiaetodes constricticollis Sokolov, 2015
- Pelodiaetodes moorei Sokolov, 2015
- Pelodiaetodes nunni Sokolov, 2015
- Pelodiaetodes prominens B.Moore, 1980
