= Perucharidius =

Scientific classification
- Domain: Eukaryota
- Kingdom: Animalia
- Phylum: Arthropoda
- Class: Insecta
- Order: Coleoptera
- Suborder: Adephaga
- Family: Carabidae
- Subfamily: Trechinae
- Tribe: Bembidiini
- Subtribe: Anillina
- Genus: Perucharidius; Mateu & M.Etonti, 2002

Genus of beetles

Perucharidius is a genus of ground beetles in the family Carabidae. There are at least two described species in Perucharidius, found in Peru.

== Species ==
These two species belong to the genus Perucharidius:

- Perucharidius andinus Mateu & M.Etonti, 2002
- Perucharidius etontii Magrini & Benelli, 2018
