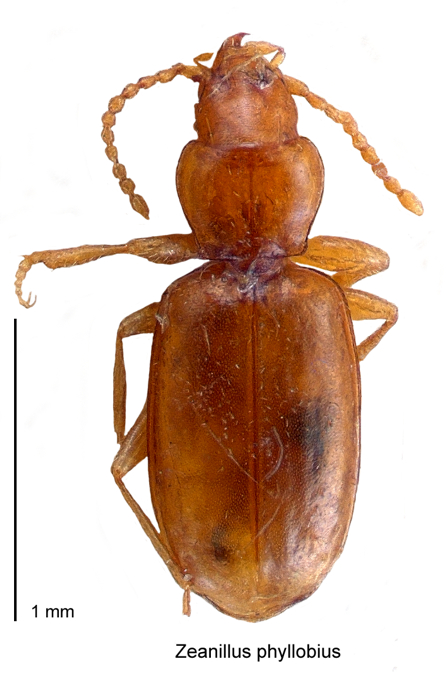
- Zeanillus phyllobius

Scientific classification
- Domain: Eukaryota
- Kingdom: Animalia
- Phylum: Arthropoda
- Class: Insecta
- Order: Coleoptera
- Suborder: Adephaga
- Family: Carabidae
- Subfamily: Trechinae
- Tribe: Bembidiini
- Subtribe: Anillina
- Genus: Zeanillus; Jeannel, 1937

Subgenera
- Brounanillus Sokolov, 2016; Nunnanillus Sokolov, 2016; Otagonillus Sokolov, 2016; Zeanillus Jeannel, 1937

= Zeanillus =

Genus of beetles

Zeanillus is a genus of ground beetles in the family Carabidae. There are about 10 described species in Zeanillus, found in New Zealand.

== Species ==
These 10 species belong to the genus Zeanillus:

- Zeanillus browni Sokolov, 2016
- Zeanillus carltoni Sokolov, 2016
- Zeanillus lescheni Sokolov, 2016
- Zeanillus montivagus Sokolov, 2016
- Zeanillus nanus Sokolov, 2016
- Zeanillus nunni Sokolov, 2016
- Zeanillus pallidus (Broun, 1884)
- Zeanillus pellucidus Sokolov, 2016
- Zeanillus phyllobius (Broun, 1893)
- Zeanillus punctigerus (Broun, 1914)
