= Tachyta inornata =

Scientific classification
- Domain: Eukaryota
- Kingdom: Animalia
- Phylum: Arthropoda
- Class: Insecta
- Order: Coleoptera
- Suborder: Adephaga
- Family: Carabidae
- Genus: Tachyta
- Species: T. inornata

Binomial name
- Tachyta inornata (Say, 1823)

Synonyms
- Tachyta picipes Kirby, 1837; Tachyta rivularis Motschulsky, 1850

Species of beetle

Tachyta inornata is a species of ground beetle in the family Carabidae.
