= Afrotachys =

Scientific classification
- Domain: Eukaryota
- Kingdom: Animalia
- Phylum: Arthropoda
- Class: Insecta
- Order: Coleoptera
- Suborder: Adephaga
- Family: Carabidae
- Tribe: Bembidiini
- Subtribe: Tachyina
- Genus: Afrotachys; Basilewsky, 1958
- Species: A. brincki

Binomial name
- Afrotachys brincki Basilewsky, 1958

Genus of beetles

Afrotachys is a genus of ground beetles in the family Carabidae. This genus has a single species, Afrotachys brincki. It is found in South Africa.
