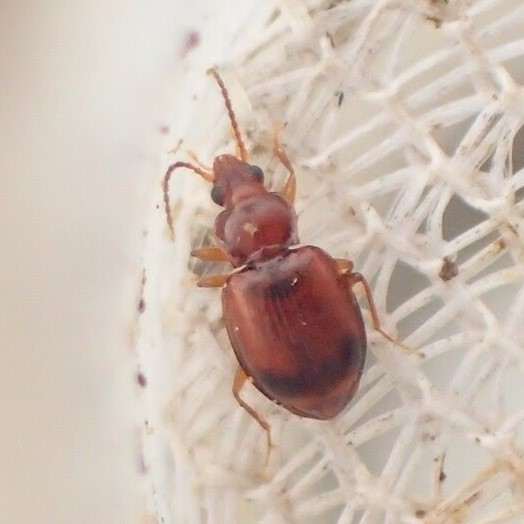
- Porotachys recurvicollis

Scientific classification
- Domain: Eukaryota
- Kingdom: Animalia
- Phylum: Arthropoda
- Class: Insecta
- Order: Coleoptera
- Suborder: Adephaga
- Family: Carabidae
- Subfamily: Trechinae
- Tribe: Bembidiini
- Subtribe: Tachyina
- Genus: Porotachys; Netolitzky, 1914

= Porotachys =

Genus of beetles

Porotachys is a genus of ground beetles in the family Carabidae. There are about six described species in the genus Porotachys.

== Species ==
These six species belong to the genus Porotachys:

- Porotachys bisulcatus (Nicolai, 1822) (North America, Europe, Africa, and temperate Asia)
- Porotachys efflatouni (Schatzmayr & Koch, 1934) (Egypt, Oman, Yemen, and Djibouti)
- Porotachys luxus (Andrewes, 1925) (Myanmar and Vietnam)
- Porotachys ottomanus Schweiger, 1968 (worldwide)
- Porotachys recurvicollis (Andrewes, 1925) (Japan)
- Porotachys termiticola (Andrewes, 1936) (Indonesia)
