= Honduranillus =

Scientific classification
- Domain: Eukaryota
- Kingdom: Animalia
- Phylum: Arthropoda
- Class: Insecta
- Order: Coleoptera
- Suborder: Adephaga
- Family: Carabidae
- Tribe: Bembidiini
- Subtribe: Anillina
- Genus: Honduranillus; Zaballos, 1997
- Species: H. balli

Binomial name
- Honduranillus balli Zaballos, 1997

Genus of beetles

Honduranillus is a genus of ground beetles in the family Carabidae. This genus has a single species, Honduranillus balli.
