= Lovricia =

Scientific classification
- Domain: Eukaryota
- Kingdom: Animalia
- Phylum: Arthropoda
- Class: Insecta
- Order: Coleoptera
- Suborder: Adephaga
- Family: Carabidae
- Subfamily: Trechinae
- Tribe: Bembidiini
- Subtribe: Lovriciina
- Genus: Lovricia; Pretner, 1979

Genus of beetles

Lovricia is a genus of ground beetles in the family Carabidae. There are at least two described species in Lovricia, found in Croatia.

== Species ==
These two species belong to the genus Lovricia:

- Lovricia aenigmatica Lakota; Mlejnek & Jalzic, 2002
- Lovricia jalzici Pretner, 1979
