= Pseudanillus =

Scientific classification
- Domain: Eukaryota
- Kingdom: Animalia
- Phylum: Arthropoda
- Class: Insecta
- Order: Coleoptera
- Suborder: Adephaga
- Family: Carabidae
- Subfamily: Trechinae
- Tribe: Bembidiini
- Subtribe: Anillina
- Genus: Pseudanillus; Bedel, 1896

Genus of beetles

Pseudanillus is a genus of ground beetles in the family Carabidae. There are about six described species in Pseudanillus.

== Species ==
These six species belong to the genus Pseudanillus:

- Pseudanillus cephalotes Coiffait, 1969 (Morocco)
- Pseudanillus elegantulus (Normand, 1916) (Tunisia)
- Pseudanillus laticeps (Normand, 1911) (Tunisia)
- Pseudanillus magdalenae (Abeille de Perrin, 1894) (Algeria and Tunisia)
- Pseudanillus marocanus (Coiffait, 1969) (Morocco)
- Pseudanillus pastorum Zaballos & Banda, 2000 (Morocco)
