= Cryptorites =

Scientific classification
- Domain: Eukaryota
- Kingdom: Animalia
- Phylum: Arthropoda
- Class: Insecta
- Order: Coleoptera
- Suborder: Adephaga
- Family: Carabidae
- Tribe: Bembidiini
- Subtribe: Anillina
- Genus: Cryptorites; Jeannel, 1950
- Species: C. scotti

Binomial name
- Cryptorites scotti Jeannel, 1950

Genus of beetles

Cryptorites is a genus of ground beetles in the family Carabidae. This genus has a single species, Cryptorites scotti.
