= Tachyta parvicornis =

Scientific classification
- Domain: Eukaryota
- Kingdom: Animalia
- Phylum: Arthropoda
- Class: Insecta
- Order: Coleoptera
- Suborder: Adephaga
- Family: Carabidae
- Genus: Tachyta
- Species: T. parvicornis

Binomial name
- Tachyta parvicornis Notman, 1922

Species of beetle

Tachyta parvicornis is a species of ground beetle in the family Carabidae. It is found in North America.
