= Anomotachys =

Scientific classification
- Domain: Eukaryota
- Kingdom: Animalia
- Phylum: Arthropoda
- Class: Insecta
- Order: Coleoptera
- Suborder: Adephaga
- Family: Carabidae
- Subfamily: Trechinae
- Tribe: Bembidiini
- Subtribe: Tachyina
- Genus: Anomotachys; Jeannel, 1946

Genus of beetles

Anomotachys is a genus of ground beetles in the family Carabidae. There are at least three described species in Anomotachys.

== Species ==
These three species belong to the genus Anomotachys:

- Anomotachys acaroides (Motschulsky, 1860) (Sri Lanka and Indonesia)
- Anomotachys curtus Jeannel, 1946 (Madagascar)
- Anomotachys cyrtonotus Jeannel, 1946 (worldwide)
