= Lymnastis =

Scientific classification
- Domain: Eukaryota
- Kingdom: Animalia
- Phylum: Arthropoda
- Class: Insecta
- Order: Coleoptera
- Suborder: Adephaga
- Family: Carabidae
- Subfamily: Trechinae
- Tribe: Bembidiini
- Subtribe: Tachyina
- Genus: Lymnastis; Motschulsky, 1862

Genus of beetles

Lymnastis is a genus of ground beetles of the subfamily Trechinae.

The body length of the adult is 2.0–2.2 millimetres (0.079–0.087 in). Body-color is yellow and flat. Representatives of this genus are characterized by the following features:

- Head is small and narrow;
- Compound eyes are usually large and are made up of about ten of the facet cells;
- Frontal supraorbital notch is reduced;
- Prischitkovaya groove on top is not bent;
- The elytron have fine hairs and have no return grooves;
- Vertex of the Abdomen appears from the elytron;
- The upper body is covered in soft hairs.

== Species ==
These 46 species belong to the genus Lymnastis:

- Lymnastis adventitius (Péringuey, 1896) (South Africa)
- Lymnastis americanus Darlington, 1934 (Cuba)
- Lymnastis angelinii Magrini, 2010 (Italy)
- Lymnastis assmanni Magrini & Wrase, 2013 (Israel)
- Lymnastis atricapillus Bates, 1892 (Myanmar, Oceania)
- Lymnastis barbieri Straneo, 1953 (Vietnam)
- Lymnastis brooksi Baehr, 2008 (Australia)
- Lymnastis coomani Jeannel, 1932 (Thailand and Vietnam)
- Lymnastis decorsei Jeannel, 1932 (worldwide)
- Lymnastis dieneri Szekessy, 1938 (Slovakia, Hungary, and Croatia)
- Lymnastis foveicollis G.Müller, 1941 (Ethiopia)
- Lymnastis galilaeus Piochard de la Brûlerie, 1876 (worldwide)
- Lymnastis gaudini Jeannel, 1929 (Canary Islands)
- Lymnastis gomerae Franz, 1965 (Canary Islands)
- Lymnastis herlanti Basilewsky, 1951 (Democratic Republic of the Congo)
- Lymnastis indicus (Motschulsky, 1851) (India and Myanmar)
- Lymnastis inops Darlington, 1962 (New Guinea and Papua)
- Lymnastis jeanneli Basilewsky, 1951 (Democratic Republic of the Congo)
- Lymnastis leleupi Basilewsky, 1949 (Democratic Republic of the Congo)
- Lymnastis lesnei Jeannel, 1932 (D.R. Congo, Rwanda, and Mozambique)
- Lymnastis luigionii Dodero, 1899 (Italy)
- Lymnastis macrops Jeannel, 1932 (worldwide)
- Lymnastis meersmanae Basilewsky, 1951 (Democratic Republic of the Congo)
- Lymnastis minutus Basilewsky, 1953 (Democratic Republic of the Congo)
- Lymnastis niloticus Motschulsky, 1862 (worldwide)
- Lymnastis novikovi Mikhailov, 1998 (Ukraine)
- Lymnastis paladinii Magrini, 2010 (Italy)
- Lymnastis pilosus Bates, 1892 (worldwide)
- Lymnastis poggii Magrini, 2010 (Romania)
- Lymnastis pullulus Motschulsky, 1862 (India)
- Lymnastis remyi Jeannel, 1949 (Madagascar)
- Lymnastis rugegeiensis Basilewsky, 1953 (Rwanda and Burundi)
- Lymnastis sanctaehelenae Basilewsky, 1972 (St. Helena)
- Lymnastis scaritides Bruneau de Miré, 1965 (Democratic Republic of the Congo)
- Lymnastis schachti Baehr, 2003 (Senegal/ Gambia)
- Lymnastis schoutedeni Jeannel, 1937 (Democratic Republic of the Congo)
- Lymnastis schuelkei Magrini & Wrase, 2012 (Albania)
- Lymnastis sinaiticus Schatzmayr, 1936 (Egypt)
- Lymnastis subovatus Machado, 1992 (Canary Islands)
- Lymnastis sugimotoi Habu, 1975 (Japan)
- Lymnastis swaluwenbergi Jeannel, 1932 (Hawaii)
- Lymnastis tesquorum Arnoldi & Kryzhanovskij, 1964 (Kazakhstan and Russia)
- Lymnastis thoracicus Machado, 1992 (Canary Islands)
- Lymnastis tibesticus Bruneau de Miré, 1990 (Chad)
- Lymnastis villiersi Bruneau de Miré, 1965 (Democratic Republic of the Congo)
- Lymnastis yanoi Nakane, 1963 (Japan)
