= Microtyphlus =

Scientific classification
- Domain: Eukaryota
- Kingdom: Animalia
- Phylum: Arthropoda
- Class: Insecta
- Order: Coleoptera
- Suborder: Adephaga
- Family: Carabidae
- Subfamily: Trechinae
- Tribe: Bembidiini
- Subtribe: Anillina
- Genus: Microtyphlus; Linder, 1863

Genus of beetles

Microtyphlus is a genus in the beetle family Carabidae. There are at least 20 described species in Microtyphlus.

== Species ==
These 20 species belong to the genus Microtyphlus:

- Microtyphlus alegrei (Español & Comas, 1985) (Spain)
- Microtyphlus aurouxi Español, 1966 (Spain)
- Microtyphlus bateti Hernando, 2000 (Spain)
- Microtyphlus canovasae Toribio & Beltran, 1993 (Spain)
- Microtyphlus charon Ortuño & Sendra, 2011 (Spain)
- Microtyphlus comasi (Vives; Escola & Vives, 2002) (Spain)
- Microtyphlus fadriquei (Español, 1999) (Spain)
- Microtyphlus fideli Viñolas & Escola, 1999 (Spain)
- Microtyphlus ganglbaueri (Breit, 1908) (Spain)
- Microtyphlus infernalis Ortuño & Sendra, 2010 (Spain)
- Microtyphlus jusmeti (Español, 1971) (Spain)
- Microtyphlus menorquensis Coiffait, 1961 (Spain and Baleares)
- Microtyphlus mesegueri Comas & Vives, 2018 (Spain)
- Microtyphlus saxatilis Magrini; Leo & Fancello, 2004 (Sardinia and Italy)
- Microtyphlus schaumi (Saulcy, 1863) (France and Spain)
- Microtyphlus serratensis Coiffait, 1958 (Spain)
- Microtyphlus torressalai Coiffait, 1958 (Spain)
- Microtyphlus virgilii (Vives; Escola & Vives, 2002) (Spain)
- Microtyphlus xaxarsi (Zariquiey, 1919) (Spain)
- Microtyphlus zariquieyi (Bolivar y Pieltain, 1916) (Spain)
