= Liotachys =

Scientific classification
- Domain: Eukaryota
- Kingdom: Animalia
- Phylum: Arthropoda
- Class: Insecta
- Order: Coleoptera
- Suborder: Adephaga
- Family: Carabidae
- Tribe: Bembidiini
- Subtribe: Tachyina
- Genus: Liotachys; Bates, 1871
- Species: L. antennatus

Binomial name
- Liotachys antennatus Bates, 1871

Genus of beetles

Liotachys is a genus of ground beetles in the family Carabidae. This genus has a single species, Liotachys antennatus. It is found in Brazil.
