= Typhlocharis =

Scientific classification
- Domain: Eukaryota
- Kingdom: Animalia
- Phylum: Arthropoda
- Class: Insecta
- Order: Coleoptera
- Suborder: Adephaga
- Family: Carabidae
- Subfamily: Trechinae
- Tribe: Bembidiini
- Subtribe: Anillina
- Genus: Typhlocharis; Dieck, 1869

Genus of beetles

Typhlocharis is a genus of ground beetles in the family Carabidae. There are more than 60 described species in Typhlocharis.

== Species ==
These 68 species belong to the genus Typhlocharis:

- Typhlocharis acutangula Perez-Gonzalez & Zaballos, 2013 (Spain)
- Typhlocharis aguirrei Zaballos & Banda, 2001 (Spain)
- Typhlocharis algarvensis Coiffait, 1971 (Portugal)
- Typhlocharis amara Zaballos; Andujar & Perez-Gonzalez, 2016 (Spain)
- Typhlocharis anachoreta Perez-Gonzalez et al., 2018 (Spain)
- Typhlocharis armata Coiffait, 1969 (Spain and Morocco)
- Typhlocharis atienzai Zaballos & Ruiz-Tapiador, 1997 (Spain)
- Typhlocharis baeturica Perez-Gonzalez & Zaballos, 2013 (Spain)
- Typhlocharis bazi Ortuño, 2000 (Spain)
- Typhlocharis belenae Zaballos, 1983 (Spain)
- Typhlocharis besucheti Vigna Taglianti, 1972 (Spain)
- Typhlocharis bivari A.Serrano & Aguiar, 2006 (Portugal)
- Typhlocharis boetica Ehlers, 1883 (Spain)
- Typhlocharis bullaquensis Zaballos & Ruiz-Tapiador, 1997 (Spain)
- Typhlocharis carinata A.Serrano & Aguiar, 2006 (Portugal)
- Typhlocharis carmenae Zaballos & Ruiz-Tapiador, 1995 (Spain)
- Typhlocharis carpetana Zaballos, 1989 (Spain)
- Typhlocharis coenobita Perez-Gonzalez et al., 2018 (Spain)
- Typhlocharis crespoi A.Serrano & Aguiar, 2008 (Portugal)
- Typhlocharis deferreri Zaballos & Perez-Gonzalez, 2011 (Spain)
- Typhlocharis diecki Ehlers, 1883 (Spain)
- Typhlocharis elenae A.Serrano & Aguiar, 2002 (Portugal and Spain)
- Typhlocharis eremita Perez-Gonzalez et al., 2018 (Spain)
- Typhlocharis estrellae Zaballos & Ruiz-Tapiador, 1997 (Spain)
- Typhlocharis fancelloi Magrini, 2000 (Spain)
- Typhlocharis farinosae Zaballos & Ruiz-Tapiador, 1997 (Spain)
- Typhlocharis fozcoaensis A.Serrano & Aguiar, 2005 (Portugal)
- Typhlocharis furnayulensis Zaballos & Banda, 2001 (Spain)
- Typhlocharis gomesalvesi A.Serrano & Aguiar, 2002 (Portugal)
- Typhlocharis gomezi Zaballos, 1992 (Spain)
- Typhlocharis gonzaloi Ortuño, 2005 (Spain)
- Typhlocharis hiekei Zaballos & Farinos, 1995 (Spain)
- Typhlocharis intermedia Zaballos, 1986 (Spain)
- Typhlocharis jeannei Zaballos, 1989 (Spain)
- Typhlocharis josabelae Ortuño & Gilgado, 2011 (Spain)
- Typhlocharis laurentii Magrini, 2000 (Spain)
- Typhlocharis loebli (Perez-Gonzalez & Zaballos, 2018) (Spain)
- Typhlocharis lunai A.Serrano & Aguiar, 2006 (Portugal and Spain)
- Typhlocharis martini Andujar; Lencina & A.Serrano, 2008 (Spain)
- Typhlocharis matiasi Zaballos & Banda, 2001 (Spain)
- Typhlocharis mendesi A.Serrano & Aguiar, 2017 (Portugal)
- Typhlocharis millenaria Zaballos & Banda, 2001 (Spain)
- Typhlocharis mixta Perez-Gonzalez & Zaballos, 2013 (Spain)
- Typhlocharis monastica Zaballos & Wrase, 1998 (Spain)
- Typhlocharis navarica Zaballos & Wrase, 1998 (Spain)
- Typhlocharis outereloi Novoa, 1978 (Spain)
- Typhlocharis pacensis Zaballos & Jeanne, 1987 (Spain)
- Typhlocharis passosi A.Serrano & Aguiar, 2005 (Portugal)
- Typhlocharis paulinoi A.Serrano & Aguiar, 2006 (Portugal)
- Typhlocharis peregrina Zaballos & Wrase, 1998 (Spain)
- Typhlocharis portilloi Zaballos, 1992 (Spain)
- Typhlocharis prima Perez-Gonzalez & Zaballos, 2013 (Spain)
- Typhlocharis quadridentata (Coiffait, 1969) (Portugal)
- Typhlocharis quarta Perez-Gonzalez & Zaballos, 2013 (Portugal)
- Typhlocharis rochapitei A.Serrano & Aguiar, 2008 (Portugal)
- Typhlocharis santschii Normand, 1916 (Tunisia)
- Typhlocharis sarrius A.Serrano & Aguiar, 2001 (Portugal)
- Typhlocharis scrofa Perez-Gonzalez & Zaballos, 2013 (Spain)
- Typhlocharis secunda Perez-Gonzalez & Zaballos, 2013 (Spain)
- Typhlocharis silvanoides Dieck, 1869 (Spain and Morocco)
- Typhlocharis simoni Ganglbauer, 1900 (Spain)
- Typhlocharis singularis A.Serrano & Aguiar, 2000 (Portugal)
- Typhlocharis tertia Perez-Gonzalez & Zaballos, 2013 (Spain)
- Typhlocharis tetramera Perez-Gonzalez & Zaballos, 2013 (Spain)
- Typhlocharis toletana Lencina & Andujar, 2010 (Spain)
- Typhlocharis toribioi Ortuño, 1988 (Spain)
- Typhlocharis wrasei Zaballos & Farinos, 1995 (Spain)
- Typhlocharis zaballosi A.Serrano & Aguiar, 2014 (Portugal)
