= Meotachys =

Scientific classification
- Domain: Eukaryota
- Kingdom: Animalia
- Phylum: Arthropoda
- Class: Insecta
- Order: Coleoptera
- Suborder: Adephaga
- Family: Carabidae
- Subfamily: Trechinae
- Tribe: Bembidiini
- Subtribe: Tachyina
- Genus: Meotachys; Erwin, 1974

Subgenera
- Hylotachys Boyd & Erwin, 2016; Meotachys Erwin, 1974; Scolistichus Boyd & Erwin, 2016

Genus of beetles

Meotachys is a genus of ground beetles in the family Carabidae. There are about 11 described species in Meotachys.

== Species ==
These 11 species belong to the genus Meotachys:

- Meotachys amplicollis (Bates, 1882) (Central America and Mexico)
- Meotachys ballorum Boyd & Erwin, 2016 (South America)
- Meotachys fraterculus (Bates, 1871) (South America)
- Meotachys insularum (Bates, 1884) (Central America)
- Meotachys jansoni (Bates, 1882) (Central America)
- Meotachys platyderus (Bates, 1871) (South America)
- Meotachys riparius Boyd & Erwin, 2016 (South America)
- Meotachys rubrum Boyd & Erwin, 2016 (South America)
- Meotachys rufulus (Motschulsky, 1855) (Central America)
- Meotachys squiresi (Bates, 1871) (South America)
- Meotachys sulcipennis (Bates, 1871) (South America)
