= Prioniomus =

Scientific classification
- Domain: Eukaryota
- Kingdom: Animalia
- Phylum: Arthropoda
- Class: Insecta
- Order: Coleoptera
- Suborder: Adephaga
- Family: Carabidae
- Tribe: Bembidiini
- Subtribe: Anillina
- Genus: Prioniomus; Jeannel, 1937

Synonyms
- Turkanillus; Corcyranillus Jeannel, 1937

Genus of beetles

Prioniomus is a genus of beetles in the family Carabidae, containing the following species:

- Prioniomus abnormis (J.Sahlberg, 1900)
- Prioniomus aegeicus Giachino & Vailati, 2019
- Prioniomus antonellae Giachino & Vailati, 2011
- Prioniomus assingi Giachino & Vailati, 2019
- Prioniomus brachati Giachino & Vailati, 2019
- Prioniomus caoduroi Giachino & Vailati, 2012
- Prioniomus cassiopaeus Pavesi, 2010
- Prioniomus etontii Giachino & Vailati, 2011
- Prioniomus gabriellae Giachino & Vailati, 2011
- Prioniomus giachinoi Vailati, 2002
- Prioniomus lombardorum Fancello & Magrini, 2015
- Prioniomus lompei Giachino & Vailati, 2019
- Prioniomus maleficus Giachino & Vailati, 2012
- Prioniomus menozzii (Schatzmayr, 1936)
- Prioniomus meybohmi Giachino & Vailati, 2019
- Prioniomus moczarskii Jeannel, 1937
- Prioniomus pedemontanorum Fancello & Magrini, 2015
- Prioniomus peloponnesiacus Giachino & Vailati, 2011
- Prioniomus scaramozzinoi Giachino & Vailati, 2011
- Prioniomus strinatii (Coiffait, 1956)
- Prioniomus vailatii Giachino, 2001
