= Winklerites =

Scientific classification
- Domain: Eukaryota
- Kingdom: Animalia
- Phylum: Arthropoda
- Class: Insecta
- Order: Coleoptera
- Suborder: Adephaga
- Family: Carabidae
- Subfamily: Trechinae
- Tribe: Bembidiini
- Subtribe: Anillina
- Genus: Winklerites; Jeannel, 1937

Genus of beetles

Winklerites is a genus of ground beetles in the family Carabidae. There are more than 20 described species in Winklerites.

== Species ==
These 21 species belong to the genus Winklerites:

- Winklerites andreae Giachino & Vailati, 2011 (Greece)
- Winklerites blazeji Giachino & Vailati, 2012 (North Macedonia)
- Winklerites casalei Giachino & Vailati, 2011 (Greece)
- Winklerites durmitorensis Nonveiller & Pavicevic, 1987 ((former) Yugoslavia and Montenegro)
- Winklerites fodori B.V.Gueorguiev, 2007 (North Macedonia)
- Winklerites gueorguievi Giachino & Vailati, 2012 (North Macedonia)
- Winklerites hercegovinensis (Winkler, 1925) (Bosnia-Herzegovina)
- Winklerites imathiae Giachino & Vailati, 2011 (Greece)
- Winklerites kuciensis Nonveiller & Pavicevic, 1987 ((former) Yugoslavia and Montenegro)
- Winklerites lagrecai Casale; Giachino & M.Etonti, 1990 (Greece)
- Winklerites luisae Giachino & Vailati, 2011 (Greece)
- Winklerites macedonicus Hristovski, 2014 (North Macedonia)
- Winklerites moraveci Giachino & Vailati, 2012 (North Macedonia)
- Winklerites paganettii (G.Müller, 1911) (Croatia)
- Winklerites serbicus Curcic et al. ((former) Yugoslavia and Serbia)
- Winklerites stevanovici Hlavac & Magrini, 2016 ((former) Yugoslavia and Serbia)
- Winklerites thracicus Giachino & Vailati, 2011 (Greece)
- Winklerites vailatii Giachino, 2001 (Greece)
- Winklerites vonickai Giachino & Vailati, 2012 (North Macedonia)
- Winklerites weiratheri (G.Müller, 1935) (Greece)
- Winklerites zaballosi Giachino & Vailati, 2011 (Greece)
