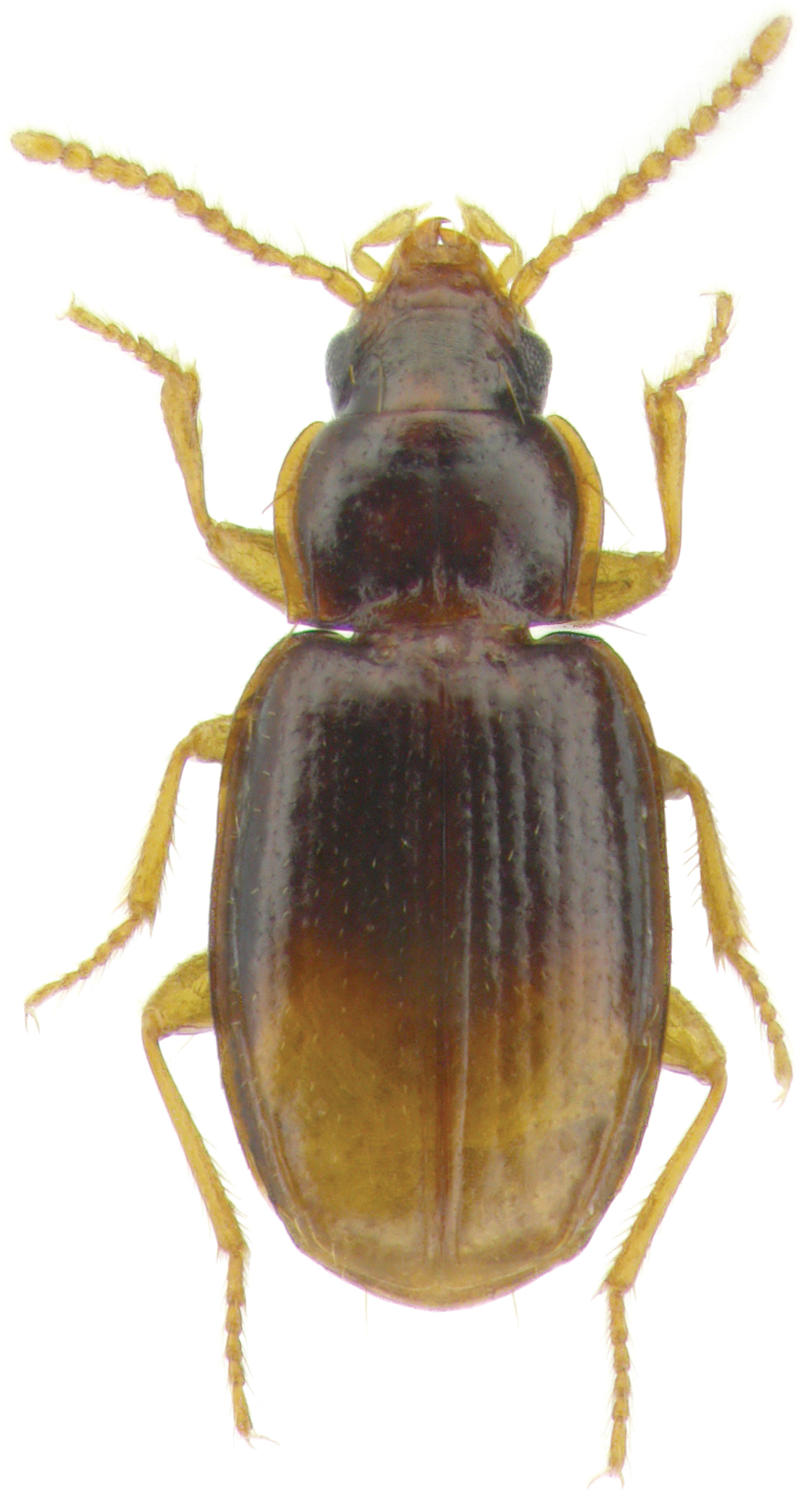
- Mioptachys flavicauda

Scientific classification
- Kingdom: Animalia
- Phylum: Arthropoda
- Class: Insecta
- Order: Coleoptera
- Suborder: Adephaga
- Family: Carabidae
- Subfamily: Trechinae
- Genus: Mioptachys; Bates, 1882

= Mioptachys =

Genus of beetles

Mioptachys is a genus of beetles in the family Carabidae, containing the following species:

- Mioptachys autumnalis (Bates, 1882)
- Mioptachys cruciger (Bates, 1871)
- Mioptachys cucujoides (Bates, 1882)
- Mioptachys flavicauda (Say, 1823)
- Mioptachys insularis (Darlington, 1939)
- Mioptachys melanius (Bates, 1871)
- Mioptachys neotropicus (Csiki, 1928)
- Mioptachys noctis (Darlington, 1935)
- Mioptachys ocularis (Casey, 1918)
- Mioptachys oopteroides Bates, 1882
- Mioptachys parallelus (Bates, 1871)
- Mioptachys trechoides Bates, 1882
- Mioptachys xanthura (Bates, 1871)
