= Anillodes =

Scientific classification
- Kingdom: Animalia
- Phylum: Arthropoda
- Class: Insecta
- Order: Coleoptera
- Suborder: Adephaga
- Family: Carabidae
- Subtribe: Anillina
- Genus: Anillodes; Jeannel, 1963

Genus of beetles

Anillodes is a genus of beetles in the family Carabidae, containing the following species:

- Anillodes affabilis (Brues, 1902)
- Anillodes debilis (Leconte, 1853)
- Anillodes depressus (Jeannel, 1963)
- Anillodes minutus Jeannel, 1963
- Anillodes sinuatus Jeannel, 1963
- Anillodes walkeri Jeannel, 1963
