= Xystosomus =

Scientific classification
- Kingdom: Animalia
- Phylum: Arthropoda
- Class: Insecta
- Order: Coleoptera
- Suborder: Adephaga
- Family: Carabidae
- Subfamily: Trechinae
- Genus: Xystosomus; Schaum, 1859

Genus of beetles

Xystosomus is a genus of beetles in the family Carabidae, containing the following species:

- Xystosomus convexus Erwin, 1973
- Xystosomus impressifrons Erwin, 1973
- Xystosomus inflatus (Schaum, 1859)
- Xystosomus laevimicans Erwin, 1973
- Xystosomus laevis Erwin, 1973
- Xystosomus niger Erwin, 1973
- Xystosomus paralaevis Erwin, 1973
- Xystosomus tholus Erwin, 1973
- Xystosomus turgidus (Schaum, 1863)
