= Malidevaraju =

12th-century ruler of Macherla in India

Malidevaraju was a monarch of Macherla in the Palnadu kingdom, in present-day Andhra Pradesh, India. He fought for the complete control of Palnadu in the Battle of Karempudi but was killed during the conflict by Nalagmaraju Yadava king of same haihaya dynasty .

Malideva was exiled from his kingdom by his step-brother Nalagmaraju, on the pretext of his defeat in a cock-fight held at Rentachintala, halfway between the kingdoms of Gujarla and Macherla.

He was assisted by the statesman and social reformer Brahma Naidu against his half-brother Nalagamaraju, who was ruling at Gurajala. He also received support from the Southern Kalachuris because he had married a Kalachuri princess of Kalyana who was the daughter of Rayamurari Sovideva, the Kalachuri king of Kalyani.
