= Rayavaram =

Rayavaram may refer to places in India:

- Rayavaram (Tamil Nadu), a Town in Pudukkottai district, Tamil Nadu
- Rayavaram, Krishna, a village in Krishna district, Andhra Pradesh
- Rayavaram, East Godavari, a village and a Mandal in East Godavari district, Andhra Pradesh
- Rayavaram, Guntur, a village in Guntur district, Andhra Pradesh
- Rayavaram, Prakasam, a village in Prakasam district, Andhra Pradesh
- Rayavaram, Kadapa, a village in Kadapa district (formerly Cuddapah district), Andhra Pradesh
- Rayavaram, Mahbubnagar, a village in Mahbubnagar district, Andhra Pradesh
- Rayavaram, Medak, a village in Medak district, Andhra Pradesh
- S.Rayavaram, a village and a Mandal in Visakhapatnam district, Andhra Pradesh
