= Chaturtha =

Jain community

The Jain Chaturtha (also spelled Chaturth, Chaturth Jains or Chaturtha-kālin Jains) are a Jain community primarily found in Karnataka and Maharashtra. they were originally Kannada and Marathi speakers. They follow the Digambar tradition of Jainism and are historically associated with landholding, agriculture, business, industries and village leadership. Community traditions also record them as having connections with ruling lineages that patronised Jainism in Karnataka and Maharashtra.

The Chaturtha Jains are mentioned in medieval inscriptions of Karnataka as important patrons of Jain temples and monasteries. They were among the early Digambar communities to settle in southern India after the decline of Jain political power in the north. Traditionally, their community history associates them with the Jain dynasties that ruled Karnataka and Maharashtra, including the Rashtrakutas, Gangas, Chalukyas, Hoysalas, and Kalachuris, Shilaharas, Kakatiyas, Alupas,and Rattas who were noted for their patronage of Jainism in the region.

== Etymology ==
The name "Chaturtha" has been interpreted in multiple ways. One explanation links it to their settlement during the "Chaturtha-kāl" (the “fourth era” in Jain cosmology) in southern India. Another theory suggests that the term refers to them being among the earliest or “fourth-period” Jains (the “fourth era” in Jain cosmology). Similarly, A parallel belief exists among the Pancham Jains, who are traditionally regarded as migrants to South India during the Pañcam-kāl (the “fifth era”), or associated with being Jain in the pancham-kāl.

== History ==
=== Origin ===
The Chaturtha Jains are regarded as one of the earliest Jain communities to have settled in Karnataka.

Historians trace their origin to North India, particularly the Magadha region (present-day Bihar), from where Jain monks and lay followers migrated to the south. According to Jain traditions, their migration is linked with the era of Bhadrabahu and the southward movement of Jain monks and communities during periods of upheaval in North India.

Epigraphic records and inscriptions indicate that Chaturthas were established in regions such as Shravanabelagola, Hassan, Mysore, Mandya, and parts of northern Karnataka including Bijapur and Banavasi region. They are considered the first Jain community to settle permanently in Karnataka.

=== Political role ===
Members of the Chaturtha Jain community are recorded as landholders and administrators, often serving as village heads (Gowdas), local chiefs (Patils and Desais), and regional officers (Nadagoudas). Some ruling lineages associated with the Gangas, Rashtrakutas, Chalukyas, and Hoysalas are traditionally believed to have been linked with the Chaturthas.

=== Migration and dispersal ===
A distinctive feature of Chaturtha Jain tradition is the record-keeping maintained by the Helavas, a community historically entrusted by King Bijjala II of the Kalachuris of Kalyani. Bijjala is said to have ordered them to preserve genealogical lists of Chaturtha Jains, and even today Helavas recite ancestral records tracing lineages for about twenty generations.

The late 12th century also witnessed severe conflict between Jains and the followers of Basava, the founder of the Veerashaiva movement. Bijjala II, who was a patron of Jainism, was assassinated in 1167 CE by radical Sharanas, according to tradition. In retaliation, Jains are believed to have killed Basava soon after at Kudalasangama. This cycle of violence deepened hostility between Jains and Veerashaivas and contributed to the collapse of the Kalachuri kingdom.

After Bijjala’s death, the Sharanas began attacking Jain temples and institutions, As political instability spread, Jain communities began migrating to safer regions They moved particularly into areas under Jain-ruled or Jain- dynasties, such as the Rattas of Saundatti and the Shilaharas of Kolhapur who were originally Jains and provided refuge. A 13th-century Shilahara inscription from Kolhapur confirms that dynasty as staunch supporters of Jainism, and encouraged their settlement in settling displaced Jains across Kolhapur, Belgaum, Bagalkot, Sangli, and along the Krishna River belt.

This dispersal explains why northern Karnataka and western Maharashtra remain historic centers of Jains, even after the decline of other Jain dynasties in southern Karnataka.

=== Later history ===
Some groups of Chaturtha Jains remained in southern Karnataka, particularly in the Gangavadi region, and maintained connections with agrarian and ruling classes. Certain traditions identify subgroups of Namadhari Gowdas and some Gangadikar Vokkaligas as originally linked to the Chaturtha Jains before they gradually assimilated into Vokkaliga identities.

Today, Chaturtha Jains are found across Karnataka and Maharashtra, particularly in Belgaum, Kolhapur, Sangli, and Bagalkot, Dharwad, where they continue to play an important role in Jain religious and cultural life and Many prominent Digambar Jain Acharyas have come from this community, including Acharya Shantisagar and Acharya Vidyasagar.

== Religious head ==
Bhattarka Jinasena of the Nadani and Kolhapur Jain Math of Sena Gana lineage, has traditionally served as the religious authority among the Chaturthas.

== Religious organizations ==
The Dakshin Bharat Jain Sabha is a religious and social service organization of the Jains of South India. The organization is headquartered at Sangli, Maharashtra, India. The association is credited with being one of the first Jain associations to start reform movements among the Jains in modern India. The organization mainly seeks to represent the interests of the native Jains of Maharashtra, Karnataka and Goa.

== See also ==
- Jainism in Mumbai
- Jainism in Maharashtra
- Jainism in North Karnataka
- Jainism in Karnataka
- Acharya Shantisagar
- Acharya Vidyasagar

== Bibiliogaraphy ==
- Sangave, Vilas Adinath (1980). Jaina Community: A Social Survey. Bombay: Popular Prakashan. ISBN 0317123467.
- Kumar, Bhuvanendra (1996). Canadian Studies in Jainism. Canada: Jain Humanities Press. ISBN 0969997825.
- Jain, Hiralal (2006). Prof. Hiralal Jain (ed.). Jain Shilalekh Sangrah, Volume I. Bombay: Manikchand Digambar Jain Granthamala Samiti. ISBN 8126311126.
- Kamath, Suryanath U. (1987). Karnataka State Gazetteer: Belgaum District. Belgaum, Karnataka: Director of Print, Stationery and Publications, Government Press.
