= Macherla mandal =

- Mandal
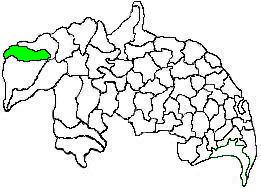
- Mandal map of Guntur district showing Macherla mandal (in green)
- Interactive map of Macherla mandal
- Location in Andhra Pradesh, India
- Coordinates: 16.2877°N 80.7519°E
- Country: India
- State: Andhra Pradesh
- District: Palnadu
- Headquarters: Macherla

Government
  - Body: Mandal Parishad
  - Tehsildar: G.Levi

Population (2011)
  - Total: 113,048

Languages
  - Official: Telugu
- Time zone: UTC+5:30 (IST)

Macherla mandal is one of the 28 mandals in the Palnadu district of the Indian state of Andhra Pradesh. It is under the administration of Gurazala revenue division and the headquarters are located at Macherla. The mandal is bounded by Rentachintala, Durgi and Veldurthi mandals and a portion of the mandal also borders the state of Telangana.

== Demographics ==
As of 2011 census, the mandal had a population of 160,303. The total population constitute, 57,140 males and 55,908 females —a sex ratio of 978 females per 1000 males. 13,486 children are in the age group of 0–6 years, of which 7,036 are boys and 6,450 are girls. The average literacy rate stands at 30.79% with 62,850 literates.

== Governance ==
The mandal is controlled by a tahsildar and the present tahsildar is G.Levi. Macherla mandal is one of the 3 mandals under Macherla (Assembly constituency), which in turn represents Narasaraopet (Lok Sabha constituency) of Andhra Pradesh.

== Towns and villages ==
As of 2011 census, the mandal has 14 settlements. It includes 1 town, 13 villages. Macherla (M) is the only town in the mandal.

The settlements in the mandal are listed below:

1. Amani Jammala Madaka
2. Kambhampadu
3. Koppunur
4. Kothapalle
5. Macherla (M)†
6. Macherla (rural)
7. Mutyalampadu
8. Nagulavaram
9. Pasuvemula
10. Rayavaram
11. Tallapalle
12. Vijayapuri South
13. Gannavaram

Note: †–Mandal headquarter, M-Municipality

== Education ==
The mandal plays a major role in education for the rural students of the nearby villages. The primary and secondary school education is imparted by government, aided and private schools, under the School Education Department of the state. As per the school information report for the academic year 2015–16, the mandal has more than 18,587 students enrolled in over 105 schools.

== See also ==
- List of mandals in Andhra Pradesh
- Villages in Macherla mandal
