= Palnati Yuddham =

Palnati Yuddham (lit. 'Palnati War') may refer to:

- Battle of Palnadu, 12th-century battle between the Macherla and Gurazala kingdoms in the Palnadu (or Palnati) region of Andhra Pradesh, India
- Palnati Yuddham (1947 film), a 1947 Indian historical film about the battle
- Palnati Yuddham (1966 film), a 1966 Indian historical film about the battle
