= Kothapalle, Palnadu district =

Kothapalle
- Village
- Interactive map of Kothapalle
- Location in Andhra Pradesh, India
- Coordinates: 16.315°N 79.912°E
- Country: India
- State: Andhra Pradesh
- District: Palnadu
- Mandal: Macherla

Government
  - Type: Panchayati raj
  - Body: Kothapalle gram panchayat

Area
  - Total: 2,557 ha (6,320 acres)

Population (2011)
  - Total: 5,992
  - Density: 234.3/km^{2} (606.9/sq mi)

Languages
  - Official: Telugu
- Time zone: UTC+5:30 (IST)
- PIN: 522426
- Area code: +91–863
- Vehicle registration: AP

Kothapalle is a village in Palnadu district of the Indian state of Andhra Pradesh. It is located in Macherla mandal of Gurazala revenue division.

== Geography ==
Kothapalle is situated to the west of the mandal headquarters, Macherla, at 16.315°N 79.912°E. It is spread over an area of 2,557 ha (6,320 acres).

== Governance ==
Kothapalle gram panchayat is the local self-government of the village. It is divided into wards and each ward is represented by a ward member.

== Education ==
As per the school information report for the academic year 2018–19, the village has a total of 3 schools. These include 1 private and 2 Zilla Parishad/MPP schools.
