= Julakanti Durgamba =

Indian politician

Julakanti Durgamba (born 22 April) is an Indian politician from Andhra Pradesh. She is a former member of the Andhra Pradesh Legislative Assembly from the Macherla Assembly constituency in the erstwhile Guntur district, later carved into Palnadu district, representing the Telugu Desam Party.

== Early life ==
Durgamba is from Macherla, Palnadu district, Andhra Pradesh. She married Julakanti Nagireddy, a former MLA from the same constituency in 1972. Her son Julakanti Brahmananda Reddy is also an MLA.

== Career ==
Durgamba won the Macherla Assembly constituency in the 1999 Andhra Pradesh Legislative Assembly election representing the Telugu Desam Party. She polled 54,128 votes and defeated her nearest rival, Pinnelli Laxma Reddy of the Indian National Congress, by 1951 votes.
