= Paluvayi =

- village
- Location within Andhra Pradesh Location within India
- Coordinates: 16°31′15″N 79°30′17″E
- Country: India
- State: Andhra Pradesh
- District: Guntur

Languages
  - Official: Telugu
- Time zone: UTC+5:30 (IST)
- Vehicle registration: AP
- Lok Sabha constituency: Narasaraopet
- Vidhan Sabha constituency: Macherla

Paluvayi, is a village in Rentachintala mandal, Palnadu district, in the Indian state of Andhra Pradesh. Apart from New Paluvayi, there is also another habitation called Paluvayi gate. The Postal Index Number of the village is 522421. It has a population of 6231 with females (3136) more than males (3095) as per 2011 census.
