= Helavaru =

Community of genealogists in Karnataka and Maharashtra

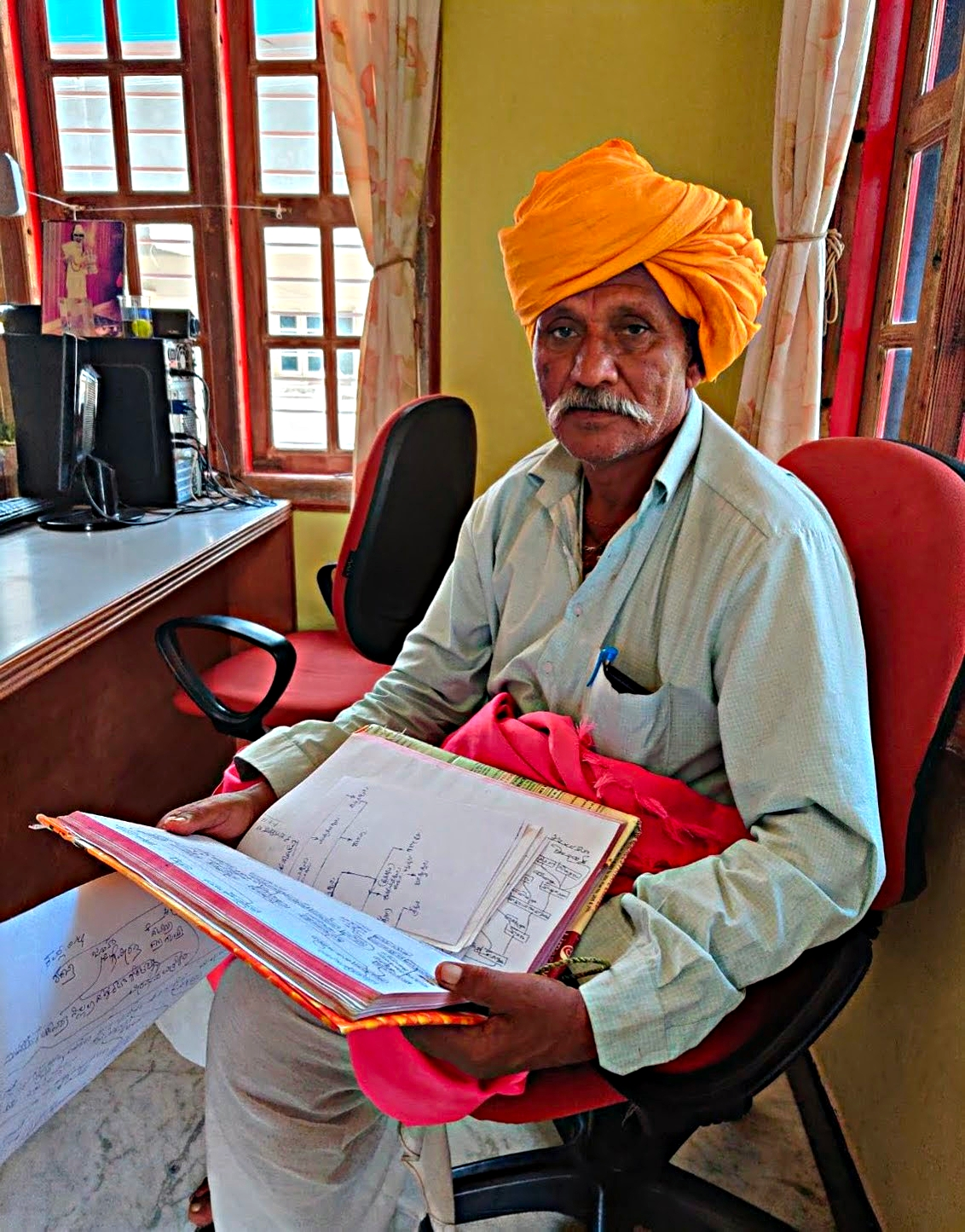
Person from the Helavaru community, a traditional group in North Karnataka

The Helavaru or Helavas are a traditional community of genealogists found mainly in Karnataka and Maharashtra, India. They are known for maintaining family lineages, reciting ancestral histories, and preserving genealogical records across generations.

The term Helava is derived from the Kannada word helu (to say or narrate), reflecting their traditional role as narrators of religious stories, genealogies, and legends associated with sacred places.

== Historical background ==
The Helava tradition is believed to have originated during the reign of the Kalachuri king Bijjala II (r. 1157–1167 CE). According to oral tradition, Bijjala, who was a patron of Jainism, appointed the Helavas to maintain the genealogical records of the Chaturtha Jains Particularly ruling lineages and Chaturtha Jains were ruling linages at the time in Karnataka.

Even today, Helavas invoke Bijjala’s name while reciting genealogies, and many Chaturtha Jain families continue to preserve ancestral details through them. Over time, the system expanded beyond Jains, and other communities—including Vokkaliga and Lingayats and many other communities of Karnataka and Maharashtra —Gradually adopted this practice of relying on Helavas for genealogical preservation.

They also acted as genealogists, preserving family histories across generations, and were patronised by local chieftains and landed families. and people of the Helava's narrate in their North Karnataka tone:- "Raja Bijjala told our ancestors to keep all these records" This oral tradition is still remembered and repeated within families as the origin of their role as record-keepers.

== Role and practice ==
Helavas travel from village to village carrying record books, which often list twenty or more generations of families. When visiting households, they recite the genealogical accounts, update the records with new births, marriages, or deaths, and collect offerings in return for their services. Their role has been important in preserving community memory, particularly in rural areas where written documentation was historically limited.

== Distribution ==
The Helava community is concentrated in Northern Karnataka districts such as Bagalkot, Belagavi, Dharwad, Gadag, and Bijapur, Sangali, Kolhapur, Bagalkot and with smaller numbers in parts of Maharashtra. They primarily speak Kannada and Marathi, depending on their regional location.

== See also ==
• Chaturtha Jains

• Kalachuris of Kalyani

== Bibliography ==
- Ramachandran, C. N. (1998). Folklore and Oral Tradition in Karnataka. Institute of Kannada Studies. p. 92.
- Nagarajaiah, Hampa (1999). Jainism in Southern Karnataka. Bangalore: Sapna Book House. pp. 112–113. OCLC 45166444.
