= Veldurthi =

Veldurthi may refer to the following places:

- Veldurthi, Guntur district, a village in Guntur district, Andhra Pradesh, India
- Veldurthi, Kurnool district, a village in Kurnool district, Andhra Pradesh, India
