= Julakanti Nagireddy =

Indian politician

Julakanti Nagi Reddy was an Indian politician from Andhra Pradesh. He was a former member of the Andhra Pradesh Legislative Assembly from the Macherla Assembly constituency in the erstwhile Guntur district representing as an independent candidate.

== Personal life ==
Reddy is from Macherla, Guntur district, Andhra Pradesh. He married Julakanti Durgamba, also a politician who became an MLA after him. His son Julakanti Brahmananda Reddy is also an MLA from Macherla.

== Career ==
Reddy first entered electoral politics contesting the 1967 Andhra Pradesh Lagislative Assemblyy election but lost the Macherla seat to the Indian National Congress candidate, Venna Linga Reddy, by 80 votes. But he came back and won the Macherla Assembly constituency in the 1972 Andhra Pradesh Lagislative Assemblyy election also as an independent candidate. He polled 36,738 votes and defeated his nearest rival and sitting MLA, Linga Reddy of the Congress, this time aruond by a margin of 11,169 votes. Later, he shifted to the Indian National Congress but could only finish third in the 1978 Andhra Pradesh Legislative Assembly election behind winner Challa Narapa Reddy of the Indian National Congress (Indira) and Karpurapu Kotaiah of the Janata Party.

He started active politics as Veldurthi grama sarpanch.
