= Vijayapuri South =

- Village
- Interactive map of Vijayapuri South
- Location in Andhra Pradesh, India
- Coordinates: 16.5579600°N 79.3085283°E
- Country: India
- State: Andhra Pradesh
- District: Palnadu
- Mandal: Macherla

Government
  - Type: Panchayati raj
  - Body: Vijayapuri South gram panchayat

Area
  - Total: 4,704 ha (11,620 acres)

Population (2011)
  - Total: 8,393
  - Density: 178.4/km^{2} (462.1/sq mi)

Languages
  - Official: Telugu
- Time zone: UTC+5:30 (IST)
- PIN: 522615
- Area code: +91–863
- Vehicle registration: AP

Vijayapuri South is a village in Palnadu district of the Indian state of Andhra Pradesh. It is located in Macherla mandal of Gurazala revenue division.

== Geography ==
Vijayapuri South is situated amidst Rayavaram Reserved Forest and to the northwest of the mandal headquarters, Macherla, at 16.315°N 79.912°E. It is spread over an area of 4,704 ha (11,620 acres).

== Governance ==
Vijayapuri South gram panchayat is the local self-government of the village. It is divided into wards and each ward is represented by a ward member.

== Education ==
As per the school information report for the academic year 2018–19, the village has a total of 8 schools. These include one government, one MPP, 4 private and 2 other type of schools.
