= Kambhampadu =

Kambhampadu may refer to:

- Kambhampadu, Macherla mandal, a village in Macherla mandal, Guntur district, Andhra Pradesh
- Kambhampadu, Pedakurapadu mandal, a village in Pedakurapadu mandal, Guntur district, Andhra Pradesh
