= Sovideva =

King of the Southern Kalachuris from 1167 to 1176

King of Southern Kalachuris
- Reign: c. 1167 – c. 1176 CE
- Predecessor: Bijjala II c. 1130 – c. 1167 CE
- Successor: Sankama II c. 1176 – c. 1180 CE
- Father: Bijjala II
- Religion: Jainism

Rayamurari Sovideva was a king of the Kalyana Kalachuris or Southern Kalachuris, who ruled over parts of present-day northern Karnataka and Maharashtra. Sovideva's rule was a "reign of terror", persecuted insurgents and the followers of Basavanna.

== Ascension to the throne ==
Rayamurari Sovideva was the younger son of the Kalachuri king Bijjala II. Bijjala II abdicated the throne and nominated Sovideva as his successor in about 1167 CE. He also persuaded Channabasavanna, the nephew of the late Basavanna, to become prime minister for the purpose of pacifying the followers of the sharana movement. However, Bijalla had become so unpopular with the statesman Basavanna's followers that he was assassinated by them. This occurred three months after the death of Basavanna. Sovideva was the father-in-law of Malidevaraju, a prince of Palnadu kingdom who fought for the throne unsuccessfully.

== Reign ==
Sovideva's succession was fiercely resisted by Mailugi, a younger brother of Bijjala II and Karna, a grandson of Bijalla. They claimed independence from Sovideva but were crushed by Sovideva, assisted by a general named Madhava.

Sovideva persecuted followers of the sharana movement and his troops chased the insurgents. According to Dr. Ratnakar D. Hosamani- "Chaos and confusion reigned supreme, insurrections and street fights became common". He was succeeded by his younger brother Sankama II.
