= Kambhampadu, Macherla mandal =

Kambhampadu Sthambapuri
- Village
- Interactive map of Kambhampadu
- Location in Andhra Pradesh##Location in India
- Coordinates: 16°59′7.0794″N 80°39′12.24″E
- Country: India
- State: Andhra Pradesh
- District: Palnadu
- Mandal: Macherla

Government
  - Type: Panchayati raj
  - Body: Kambhampadu gram panchayat

Area
  - Total: 3,068 ha (7,580 acres)

Population (2011)
  - Total: 8,681
  - Density: 283.0/km^{2} (732.8/sq mi)

Languages
  - Official: Telugu
- Time zone: UTC+5:30 (IST)
- PIN: 522xxx
- Area code: +91–8649
- Vehicle registration: AP

Kambhampadu is a village in Palnadu district of the Indian state of Andhra Pradesh. It is located in Macherla mandal of Gurazala revenue division.

== Geography ==
Kambhampadu is situated to the northeast of the mandal headquarters, Macherla, at 16°59′7.0794″N 80°39′12.24″E. It is spread over an area of 3,068 ha (7,580 acres).

== Demographics ==
Kambhampadu has a population of 8,681 of which 4,434 are male and 4,247 are female, as per the Population Census of 2011. In 2011, the literacy rate of Kambhampadu village was 54.90%, compared to 67.02% in the rest of the state. The male rate in Kambhampadu is 67.82% while the female rate is 41.61%.

== Governance ==
Kambhampadu gram panchayat is the local self-government of the village. It is divided into wards and each ward is represented by a ward member.

== Education ==
As per the school information report for the academic year 2018–19, the village has a total of 3 Zilla Parishad/MPP schools.
