= Kayithi Narsi Reddy =

Kayithi Narsi Reddy is an Indian politician initially associated with INC and then with YSR Congress Party. He was elected as MLA from Gurazala constituency in the year 1989 for the term 89–94. Reddy was born in Rentachintala village of Guntur district, Andhra Pradesh into an agrarian family. His father is a widely respected man and is seen as a leader all around the Palnadu area.

Reddy won the 1989 general elections with a margin of 23,000+ votes which is the highest in district as well as one of the highest margins in the state.
