= Khilegaon =

- Village
- Country: India
- State: Karnataka
- District: Belgaum

Languages
  - Official: Kannada
- Time zone: UTC+5:30 (IST)

Khilegaon is a village in Belgaum district in Karnataka, India. It is famous for its Basaveshwara temple. History has it that the sultan wanted to destroy the temple but the villagers didn't resent. It was impossible to break the basava and ended up asking for forgiveness by the same Adilshahi, second sultan of Vijayapur.

The Shree Basaveshwar Temple (also known as the Khilegaon Basavanna Temple) is a highly revered historical shrine located in Khilegaon village, within the Athani Taluk of the Belagavi district in Karnataka. Dedicated to Lord Basavanna (the sacred Nandi bull, Vahana of Lord Shiva), this temple holds a significant place in the cultural and spiritual heritage of the Lingayat community and attracts thousands of devotees from across Karnataka and neighboring Maharashtra.History & Legend The Cow and the Burrow: Local legend dictates that a humble, devout farmer named Davalhappa noticed one of his cows regularly feeding its milk into a snake's burrow. He later received a divine dream revealing that a sacred presence resided there, leading to the discovery of the Swayambhu (self-manifested) idol of Basavanna. Adil Shahi Confrontation: Historical lore states that the second Sultan of Bijapur (Adil Shahi dynasty) attempted to destroy the temple. When soldiers struck the stone Basavanna idol with a spear, milk allegedly flowed out of one side and blood from the other. Astonished and deeply remorseful, the Sultan desisted from further destruction, asked the villagers for forgiveness, and instead contributed to the completion of the temple.Core Rituals & Practices Agrani Holy Water: Every single day, priests bring holy water from the nearby Agrani River (located near the Shri Sangamnath Temple) to perform special poojas for the deity three times. Belhe Pooja: A highly unique decorative ritual where the massive Basavanna idol is beautifully adorned using various lentils, grains, rice, and flowers.Weekly Procession: A ceremonial Pallakki Utsava (palanquin procession) takes place around the temple grounds every Monday evening.Festivals & Devotee Services Major Fairs: Massive annual festivals (Jatre) gather during the auspicious times of Ugadi (the Kannada New Year) and the holy month of Shravan, drawing hundreds of thousands of pilgrims. Nitya Anna Dasoha: Embracing the core philosophy of Basavanna, the temple functions as a community hub providing free food (breakfast, lunch, and dinner) to all visitors 365 days a year.Facilities: For travelers visiting this border-region shrine, the temple management offers halting rooms, clean public restrooms, and ample parking facilities.
