= Rayavaram, Palnadu district =

Rayavaram
- Village
- Interactive map of Rayavaram
- Location in Andhra Pradesh, India
- Coordinates: 16.315°N 79.912°E
- Country: India
- State: Andhra Pradesh
- District: Palnadu
- Mandal: Macherla

Government
  - Type: Panchayati raj
  - Body: Rayavaram gram panchayat

Area
  - Total: 1,913 ha (4,730 acres)

Population (2011)
  - Total: 4,149
  - Density: 216.9/km^{2} (561.7/sq mi)

Languages
  - Official: Telugu
- Time zone: UTC+5:30 (IST)
- PIN: 522426
- Area code: +91–863
- Vehicle registration: AP

Rayavaram is a village in Palnadu district of the Indian state of Andhra Pradesh. It is located in Macherla mandal of Gurazala revenue division.

== Geography ==
Kambhampadu is situated to the northeast of the mandal headquarters, Macherla, at 16.315°N 79.912°E. It is spread over an area of 1,913 ha (4,730 acres).

== Governance ==
Rayavaram gram panchayat is the local self-government of the village. It is divided into wards and each ward is represented by a ward member.

== Education ==
As per the school information report for the academic year 2018–19, the village has only one MPP school.
