= Pinnelli Ramakrishna Reddy =

Indian politician

Member of Legislative Assembly, Andhra Pradesh
- In office 2009–2024
- Preceded by: Pinnelli Laxma Reddy
- Succeeded by: Julakanti Brahmananda Reddy
- Constituency: Macherla

Personal details
- Born: 15 February 1970 (age 56) Kandlakunta, Veldurthi Mandalam, Guntur district (now Palnadu district), Andhra Pradesh
- Party: YSR Congress Party
- Other political affiliations: Indian National Congress (until 2011)
- Spouse: Pinnelli Ramadevi
- Parent: Pinnelli Venkateswara Reddy (father)
- Education: B.Com (1991)
- Alma mater: A. C. College

Pinnelli Ramakrishna Reddy (born 1970) is an Indian politician from Andhra Pradesh. He is a member of the Andhra Pradesh Legislative Assembly from Macherla Assembly constituency in Guntur district. He won the 2019 Andhra Pradesh Legislative Assembly election representing the YSR Congress Party. He was nominated again to contest the Macherla seat in the 2024 Assembly election and lost.

== Early life and education ==
Reddy was born in Kandlakunta village, Veldurthi mandal, Guntur district. His father's name is Pinnelli Venkateswara Reddy. He completed his intermediate, the pre university course from SKRBR college, Narasaraopet and did his B.Com. degree from Andhra Christian College, Guntur.

== Career ==
Reddy started his political journey with Indian National Congress. He was a member of ZPTC before serving as MLA of Macherla representing Indian National Congress in 2009. Reddy, who was a loyalist to Y. S. Jagan Mohan Reddy, resigned from the Congress and won for the second time from Macherla constituency in the 2012 Andhra Pradesh Legislative Assembly by-election and went on to win the 2014 Andhra Pradesh Legislative Assembly election. He was elected for the fourth time winning the 2019 Andhra Pradesh Legislative Assembly election defeating Annapureddy Anji Reddy of Telugu Desam Party by a margin of 21,918 votes. In January 2020, he was allegedly attacked by unidentified protestors who were agitating against YSRCP's announcement of three capitals for the state. He again contested from the same constituency as a YSRCP candidate in the 2024 Andhra Pradesh Legislative Assembly election and lost decisively to the TDP candidate, Julakanti Brahmananda Reddy, by a margin of 33,318 votes.

== Controversies ==
=== EVM Damage case ===
On 13 May 2024, Reddy was recorded on CCTV entering a polling booth in Macherla constituency and damaging a voter-verified paper audit trail machine at the booth. A first information report was lodged against him and the Andhra Pradesh High Court granted him anticipatory bail. the Supreme Court of India barred Reddy from entering the vote counting station for his constituency on 4 June, when election results would be declared, and termed his conduct and the anticipatory bail granted to him by the Andhra Pradesh High Court as "sheer mockery of justice system". He was subsequently arrested and jailed for 90 days in Nellore jail for investigation.

=== Palnadu Double Murder case ===
Reddy and his brother Pinnelli Venkatarami Reddy were named among the accused in the brutal killing of two TDP workers. The victims were allegedly chased, rammed with a Scorpio, dragged along the road and finally bludgeoned to death. Andhra Pradesh High Court dismissed the anticipatory bail petitions filed by Reddy and his brother citing the seriousness of the charges and the need for custodial interrogation. The Supreme Court upheld the AP High Court decision and dismissed the anticipatory bail petitions of Reddy and his brother. The court directed both brothers to surrender within two weeks and expressed displeasure over the alleged access to case diary material even before the chargesheet was filed.

== Electoral statistics ==
#	Year	Constituency	Party	Opponent	Votes	Vote %	Margin	Result
1	2009	Macherla	INC	Julakanti Brahmananda Reddy	66,953	58,720	+9,785	Won
2	2012	Macherla	YSRCP	Chirumamilla Madhu Babu	79,751	64,272	+15,479	Won
3	2014	Macherla	YSRCP	Kommareddy Chalama Reddy	92,249	90,714	+3,535	Won
4	2019	Macherla	YSRCP	Annapureddy Anji Reddy	1,10,406	88,488	+21,918	Won
5	2024	Macherla	YSRCP	Julakanti Brahmananda Reddy	89,095	1,22,413	-33,318	Lost
