= Palnati Yuddham (1966 film) =

- Theatrical release poster
- Directed by: G. Ramineedu
- Written by: Vempati Sadasivabrahmam (story / dialogues)
- Screenplay by: G. Ramineedu
- Produced by: T. Hanumantha Rao; Y. Lakshmaiah Chowdary; D. Suryanarayana
- Starring: N. T. Rama Rao; Bhanumathi
- Cinematography: C. Nageswara Rao
- Edited by: Gopal
- Music by: S. Rajeswara Rao
- Production company: Sri Anurupa Films
- Release date: 18 February 1966
- Running time: 182 minutes
- Country: India
- Language: Telugu

Palnati Yuddham (transl. The Battle of Palnadu) is a 1966 Indian Telugu-language historical war film directed by G. Ramineedu. It stars N. T. Rama Rao and P. Bhanumathi, with music composed by S. Rajeswara Rao. The film is based on the Battle of Palnadu which occurred in Palnadu region in c. 1180 CE. It was produced by T. Hanumantha Rao, Y. Lakshmaiah Chowdary, and D. Suryanarayana under the Sri Anurupa Films banner. The film was first made under the same title in 1947. It received the Certificate of Merit for Best Feature Film in Telugu at the 13th National Film Awards.

== Plot ==
The film begins at Palnadu, where Chief Minister Brahmanaidu and his wife, Ithamba, are blessed with a long-awaited son. The capital city of Gurajala is filled with ecstasy during the naming ceremony, where the child is named Balachandra. King Nalagamaraju, his brother Narasimha Raju, and their stepmother Vidhyala Devi all arrive to offer their blessings to the newborn. However, the joy is short-lived when palace astrologers foresee an omen: the child is destined to cause a catastrophic, blood-drenched war across Palnadu. Devastated but bound by his steadfast pacifism, Brahmanaidu commands his men to kill the infant to save the kingdom. Unbeknownst to him, his brother-in-law, Kannamma Naidu, shields the baby and raises him in secret.

== Cast ==
- N. T. Rama Rao as Palnati Brahmanaidu
- Bhanumathi as Nayakuralu Nagamma
- Kanta Rao as Alaraju
- Haranath as Balachandrudu
- Gummadi as Nalagaama Raju
- Rajanala as Narasimha Raju
- M. Balaiah as Malidevadulu
- Mikkilineni as Kannama Naidu
- Mukkamala as Kommaraju
- K. V. S. Sarma as Gopa Mantri
- Prabhakar Reddy as Kannama Dasu
- Tyagaraju as Veerabhadrudu
- Anjali Devi as Ithamba
- Jamuna as Maguva Manchala
- Hemalatha as Vidyala Devi
- Chayadevi as Rekhanba
- L. Vijayalakshmi as Subbai
- Vasanthi as Peerindevi

== Soundtrack ==
Palnati Yuddham

Film score by S. Rajeswara Rao
- Released: 1966
- Genre: Soundtrack
- Length: 29:59
- Producer: S. Rajeswara Rao

Music composed by S. Rajeswara Rao.

S. No.	Song title	Lyrics	Singers	length
1	"Satavahana"	Pulupula Sivaiah	B. Gopalam	1:36
2	"Velugocchene"	Malladi Ramakrishna Sastry	Swarnalatha, Vasantha	3:57
3	"Jaya Sambho"	Malladi Ramakrishna Sastry	Bhanumathi Ramakrishna	3:02
4	"Teeyani Tolireyi"	Aarudhra	P. B. Srinivas, S. Janaki	4:02
5	"Rammante Raavemira"	Kosaraju	P. Susheela	4:33
6	"Oka Megham"	Dasaradhi	P. Susheela, S. Janaki	3:59
7	"Amma Bangaru Talli"	Malladi Ramakrishna Sastry	P. Susheela	1:20
8	"Sheelamugalavari Chinavada"	Malladi Ramakrishna Sastry	M. Balamuralikrishna, P. Susheela	3:00
9	"Rati Cheti Rachiluka"	Malladi Ramakrishna Sastry	M. Balamuralikrishna, P. Susheela	4:30

== Awards ==
- The film won National Film Award for Best Feature Film in Telugu - certificate of merit in 1967. Also Bhanumathi received the Rashtrapati Award for her role.

== See also ==
- Palnati Yuddham (1947 film)
