= New Paluvayi =

- village
- Interactive map of New Paluvayi
- Location in Andhra Pradesh, India
- Coordinates: 16°31′14″N 79°30′17″E
- Country: India
- State: Andhra Pradesh
- District: Palnadu

Population
  - Total: 600

Languages
  - Official: Telugu
- Time zone: UTC+5:30 (IST)
- Vehicle registration: AP
- Nearest city: Guntur
- Lok Sabha constituency: Narsaraopet
- Vidhan Sabha constituency: Macherla

New Paluvayi also spelled as Kotha Paluvoi, is a hamlet of Paluvayi in Rentachintala mandal, Palnadu district, Andhra Pradesh, India. The village population is approximately 600. It has a Zilla Parishad High School which was established in 1997. Paluvayi village Postal Index Number (PIN) is 589836. It also has a Railway halt station.
