= Gurazala =

- Town
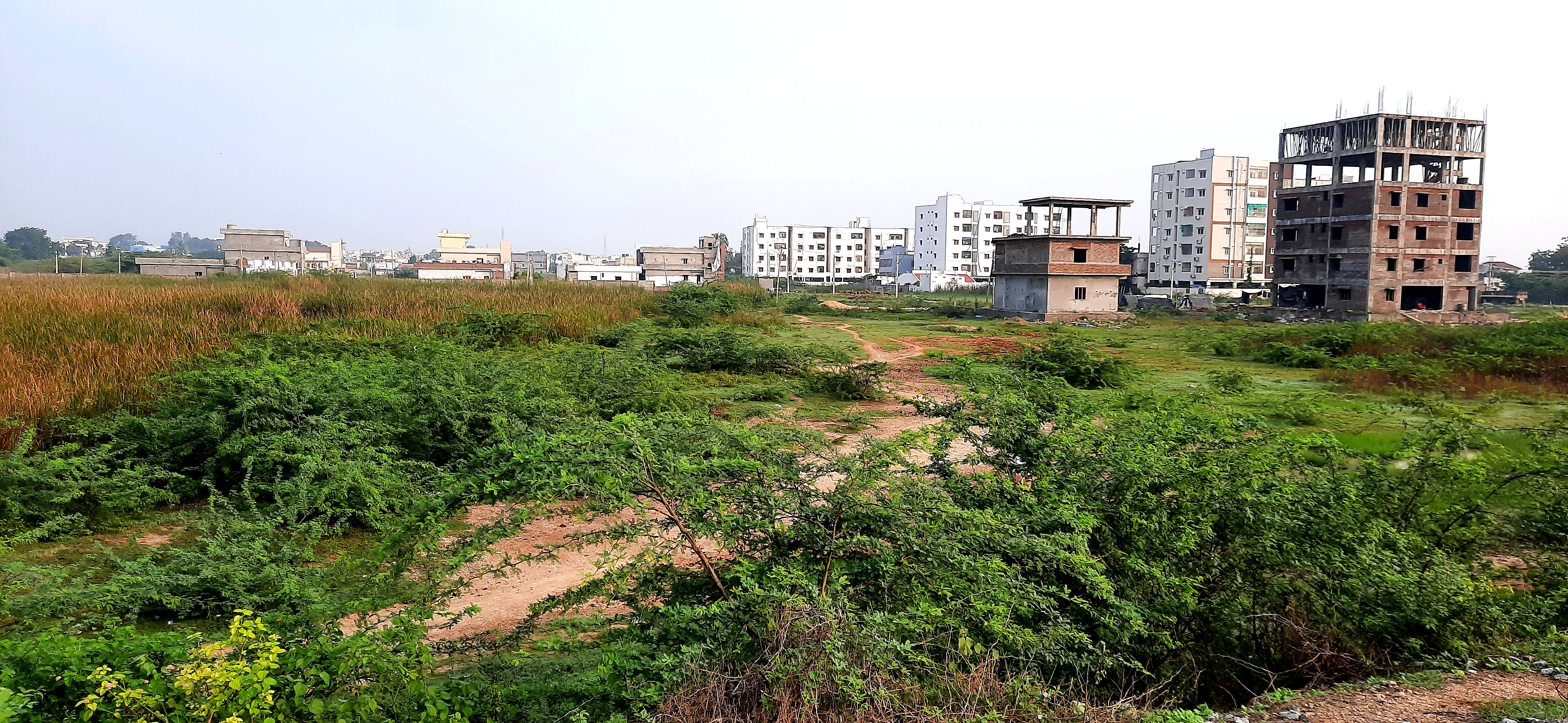
- Interactive map of Gurazala
- Location in Andhra Pradesh, India
- Coordinates: 16.58°N 79.57°E
- Country: India
- State: Andhra Pradesh
- District: Palnadu
- Revenue division: Gurazala
- Assembly constituency: Gurazala
- Mandal: Gurazala
- Established: 11th century AD
- Incorporated (town): 25-01-2020
- Seat: Gurazala Nagar Panchayat
- MajorAreas: Srirampuram, Jangamaheswarapuram, kattela Adithi Center, Old Lakshmi Talkies Center, The iconic Palanati Bramhanaidu Statue Center/Macherla-Guntur-Karempudi Junction Road

Government
  - Type: Municipality
  - Body: GurazalaNagar Panchayat
  - Member of Legislative Assembly of Andhra Pradesh: Yarapathineni Srinivasa Rao

Area
  - Total: 4,341 ha (10,730 acres)

Population (2011)
  - Total: 35,500 + (estd)
  - Density: 818/km^{2} (2,120/sq mi)

Languages
  - Official: Telugu
- Time zone: UTC+5:30 (IST)
- PIN: 522415
- Area code: +91–8649
- Vehicle registration: AP

Gurazala is a town in Palnadu district in the Indian state of Andhra Pradesh. It is the headquarters of Gurazala mandal, Gurazala Assembly constituency and Gurazala revenue division.It was formed as a Nagar Panchayat combining panchayats of Gurazala and (J.M.Puram) Jangamaheswarapuram in 2020 by the government of Andhra Pradesh. The town has a history over 900+ years in the historical palnadu times (11th century) and served as the headquarters/capital of the region during 11th century.

== History ==
The battle of Palnadu took place between Gurazala and Macherla between 1176 AD – 1182 AD at Karampudi (Yuddabhoomi). Gurazala is capital of the Palnadu kingdom. This is one of the historical places in Andhra Pradesh.

== Geography ==
Gurazala is situated at 16.58°N 79.57°E. It is spread over an area of 4,341 ha (10,730 acres).

== Governance ==
Gurazala nagar panchayat is the municipal body of the town.

Governance
Department	Incharge
Legislative	Gurazala MLA, Gurazala Municipality Chairman
Executive	Gurazala RDO, Gurazala MRO
Judiciary	Hon'ble Gurazala Court Judge, Addl.District Court Complex.
Police Sub Division	Gurazala DSP
Health	PHC, UHC Gurazala

== Culture ==
Amaralingeswara Swami Temple is located in the village of Daida Bilam, near Gurazala. The temple features a significant Shiva Lingam and a large Nandi, both situated inside a small cave (Bilam). The temple's central feature is the Nagarjunasila, under which the main Shiva Lingam is located. Additionally, the temple includes a common arched structure that houses deities such as Lord Shiva, Bramaramba Devi, Ganesha, and Subramanya Swamy.

== Notable people ==
- Nayakuralu Nagamma, minister of the Gurajala faction who led the army against Macherla faction in the Battle of Palnadu,
- Kaneganti Hanumanthu, started the Palnadu Rebellion against taxes.
- Kayithi Narsi Reddy, politician
- Palnati Bramhanaidu, Minister of Palnadu Kingdom and a great social reformer of medieval india.
- Kavuri Venkaiah, a freedom fighter, started training institutes for teachers and free education for many poor people around the Palnadu area.

== Education ==
The village had 25 schools in 2018–2019, including one each of government, model, KGBV and state welfare residential schools; 11 private and 10 Zilla/Mandal Parishad schools. Jagarlamudi Zilla Parishad High School is a district council funded school, which provides Secondary education in the village.
