= Karempudi =

- Village
- Interactive map of Karempudi
- Location in Andhra Pradesh, India
- Coordinates: 16.4333°N 79.7167°E
- Country: India
- State: Andhra Pradesh
- District: Palnadu
- Mandal: Karempudi

Government
  - Type: Panchayati raj
  - Body: Karempudi gram panchayat

Area
  - Total: 1,726 ha (4,270 acres)

Population (2011)
  - Total: 14,385
  - Density: 833.4/km^{2} (2,159/sq mi)

Languages
  - Official: Telugu
- Time zone: UTC+5:30 (IST)
- PIN: 522614
- Area code: +91–8649
- Vehicle registration: AP

Karempudi is a village in Palnadu district of the Indian state of Andhra Pradesh. It is the headquarters of Karempudi mandal in Gurazala revenue division. The village is historically significant as a ground for the Battle of Palnadu that happened in 12th century, often referred to as the "Andhra Kurukshetra". In addition to its cultural heritage, Karempudi is also known for archaeological findings that date back to the Lower Paleolithic Age.

== History ==
The battle of Palnadu (Palnati Yudham) was immortalized in Telugu literature by the poet Srinatha in his 'Palnati Vira Charita'. The only other scholarly book on the subject was written by Gene Roghair titled "Epic of Palnadu: Study and Translation of Palnati Virula Katha, a Telugu Oral Tradition from Andhra Pradesh". It was a battle between two factions of the Kalachuris (Haihaya). Karempudi is also notable for its archaeological significance, with evidence of Lower Paleolithic habitation discovered in the area. The site has yielded some of the earliest examples of hafting technology in India, placing it among important prehistoric locations in Andhra Pradesh alongside Nagarjunakonda.

== Geography ==
Karempudi is situated at 16.4333°N 79.7167°E. It is spread over an area of 1,120 ha (2,800 acres). Naguleru stream is the source of water for the village.

== Governance ==
Karempudi gram panchayat is the local self-government of the village. It is divided into wards and each ward is represented by a ward member.

== Culture ==
The Palnati Veerula Gudi temple, built at the site of the battle on the banks of the Naguleru River, commemorates the warriors of the Battle of Palnadu. The temple is opened annually for five days, usually in November or December, during which a local fair called Tirunalla or Jatara is celebrated in Karempudi and neighboring villages. Other prominent temples in Karempudi include the Ankalamma Temple, Chenna Kesava Swamy Temple, Mantralamma Temple in the nearby forest, and the recently established Anjaneyaswami Temple, which was constructed after the discovery of a large Hanuman statue during canal excavation near the village.

== Education ==
As per the school information report for the academic year 2018–19, the village has 18 schools. These include one model, one KGBV, 6 private, 7 Zilla/Mandal Parishad and 3 other types of schools.
