= Palanati Brahmanaidu =

Indian politician

Palanati Brahmanaidu (flourished in the 12th century AD); real name: Seelam Brahma Naidu was the minister in a small Andhra kingdom of Palnadu (part of present Palnadu district). He was responsible for the administration of Palnadu ruled by Haihaya Chief Nalagama. Differences in ideology and court conspiracies led to Brahma Naidu leaving with his supporters, from the court of Gurajala ruled by Nalagamaraju. Nalagama's half brother Malideva established a domain with the support of Brahmanaidu at Macherla.

== The Battle of Palnadu ==
The Battle of Palnadu (Palnati Yudham) was immortalized in Telugu literature by the poet Srinatha in his 'Palnati Vira Charita'. The only other scholarly book on the subject was a study of its use in traditional Telugu poetry, Gene Roghair's 1982 Epic of Palnadu: Study and Translation of Palnati Virula Katha, a Telugu Oral Tradition from Andhra Pradesh. This war was very important in the social history of Andhra Pradesh. It was a battle between two factions of the Palanati Haihayas.

In the battle, Brahmanaidu's son named Balachundrudu fought courageously and died. Brahmanaidu won the battle and Nagamma, the minister of king Nalagmaraju fled from the field. However, Malidevaraju had died fighting in the battle and Brahmanaidu was forced to install Nalagmaraju as the king, who was the only surviving member of the Palnadu royal family. Subsequently, Brahma Naidu retired to the forests, renouncing the world.

== In popular culture ==
- The 1947 Telugu film Palnati Yudham depicted various aspects of the war and the human emotions surrounding it. It was directed by L. V. Prasad and starred Govindarajula Subba Rao as Brahmanaidu.
- Palnati Yudham was remade in 1966, directed by Gutta Ramineedu, with N.T.R in the role of Brahmanaidu.
- Palanati Brahmanaidu was a 2003 movie starring Nandamuri Balakrishna, a contemporary take on the conflict.
