= Palnati Yuddham (1947 film) =

- Theatrical release poster
- Directed by: L. V. Prasad; Gudavalli Ramabrahmam
- Written by: Samudrala Sr (dialogues)
- Story by: Vempati Sadasivabrahmam
- Produced by: Koganti Venkata Subba Rao
- Starring: Akkineni Nageswara Rao; Govindarajula Subba Rao; Kannamba; S. Varalakshmi
- Cinematography: Jiten Bannerjee
- Edited by: Maanikyam
- Music by: Gali Penchala Narasimha Rao
- Production company: Sri Sarada Productions
- Distributed by: Prasad Productions
- Release date: 24 September 1947
- Running time: 129 mins
- Country: India
- Language: Telugu

Palnati Yuddham is a 1947 Indian Telugu-language historical war film jointly directed by L. V. Prasad and Gudavalli Ramabrahmam. Based on the Battle of Palnadu, the film stars Akkineni Nageswara Rao, Govindarajula Subba Rao and Kannamba, with music composed by Galipenchala Narasimha Rao. It is produced by Koganti Venkata Subba Rao under the Sri Sarada Productions banner.

The film was remade in Telugu with the same title in 1966, starring N. T. Rama Rao and Bhanumathi Ramakrishna.

== Cast ==
- Akkineni Nageswara Rao as Balachandrudu
- Govindarajula Subba Rao as Brahmanaidu
- Kannamba as Nayakuralu Nagamma
- S. Varalakshmi as Maguva Manchala
- Teegala Venkateswarlu as Nalagama Raju
- Mudigonda Lingamurthy as Narasinga Raju
- D. S. Sadasiva Rao as Malideva Raju
- V. Koteswara Rao as Kannamadasu
- Gidugu Venkata Seetapati Rao as Kommaraju
- Koneru Kutumba Rao as Alaraju
- Vangara as Subbanna
- A. Annapoorna as Renukamba
- G. Visweswaramma as Iytamba
- J. Gangaratnam as Anmamba
- B. Narimani as Koyapilla
- T. Rajabala as Dancer

== Soundtrack ==
Palnati Yuddham

Film score by Galipenchala Narasimha Rao
- Released: 1947
- Genre: Soundtrack
- Producer: Galipenchala Narasimha Rao

Music was composed by Galipenchala Narasimha Rao. Lyrics were written by Samudrala Sr.

S. No.	Song title	Singers	length
1	Chandamama	S. Varalakshmi	2:12
2	Chutamurarayya	Ghantasala, Akkineni, Sundaramma	3:36
3	Ee Kuhu Raatri	Akkineni, S. Varalakshmi	5:55
4	Evaravaya Deva	Kannamba	2:10
5	Jhanajhana Kalantaka	Kannamba	
6	Kamala Manohara		
7	Maala Kuduga Maare		
8	Meta Daavani Macharla	Ghantasala, Akkineni, Sundaramma, Prayaga	4:22
9	Nedu Nijamura Nee Repu	Sundaramma	
10	Oho Bharata Yuvati	Susarla	
11	Oho Charusheela	Akkineni, S. Varalakshmi	2:37
12	Raa Kadali Raa		
13	Teeripoyena Maata	Ghantasala	
14	Tera Teeyagarada Deva	Ghantasala, Kannamba	
15	Tana Pantamu Naatona	Kannamba	
16	Vachunate Raju Naa Raju Mana Raju	S. Varalakshmi	

== Production ==
- The shooting of the movie started in 1945 when after 10% of the shoot was completed, director Gudavalli Ramabrahmam expired with illness. Then L. V. Prasad took up the megaphone and completed it with Katuri Jaganmohan as his associate. At the beginning of the movie, Gudavalli's death and funeral scenes were shown.
- Gudavalli Ramabrahmam and lyricist Samudrala were colleagues at the magazine Prajamithra, they had worked together the first time in this film.
- The movie was the first historical movie in Telugu and it is the debut film for S. Varalakshmi as a singer.
