= Kambhampadu, Pedakurapadu mandal =

Kambhampadu
- Village
- Interactive map of Kambhampadu
- Location in Andhra Pradesh, India
- Coordinates: 16.5078°N 79.4825°E
- Country: India
- State: Andhra Pradesh
- District: Palnadu
- Mandal: Macherla ( Macherla)

Government
  - Type: Panchayati raj
  - Body: Kambhampadu gram panchayat

Area
  - Total: 746 ha (1,840 acres)

Population (2011)
  - Total: 1,934
  - Density: 259/km^{2} (671/sq mi)

Languages
  - Official: Telugu
- Time zone: UTC+5:30 (IST)
- PIN: 522436
- Area code: +91–8641
- Vehicle registration: AP

Kambhampadu is a village in the Palnadu district of the Indian state of Andhra Pradesh in Macherla mandal of Guntur revenue division.

== Government and politics ==
Kambhampadu gram panchayat is the local self-government of the village. It is divided into wards and each ward is represented by a ward member. The ward members are headed by a Sarpanch. The village forms a part of Andhra Pradesh Capital Region and is under the jurisdiction of APCRDA.

== Education ==
As of the academic year 2018–19, the village had two Mandal Parishad schools.
