= Macherla Assembly constituency =

Constituency of the Andhra Pradesh Legislative Assembly, India

Coordinates: 16.48°N 79.44°E

Macherla
- Constituency No. 101 for the Andhra Pradesh Legislative Assembly
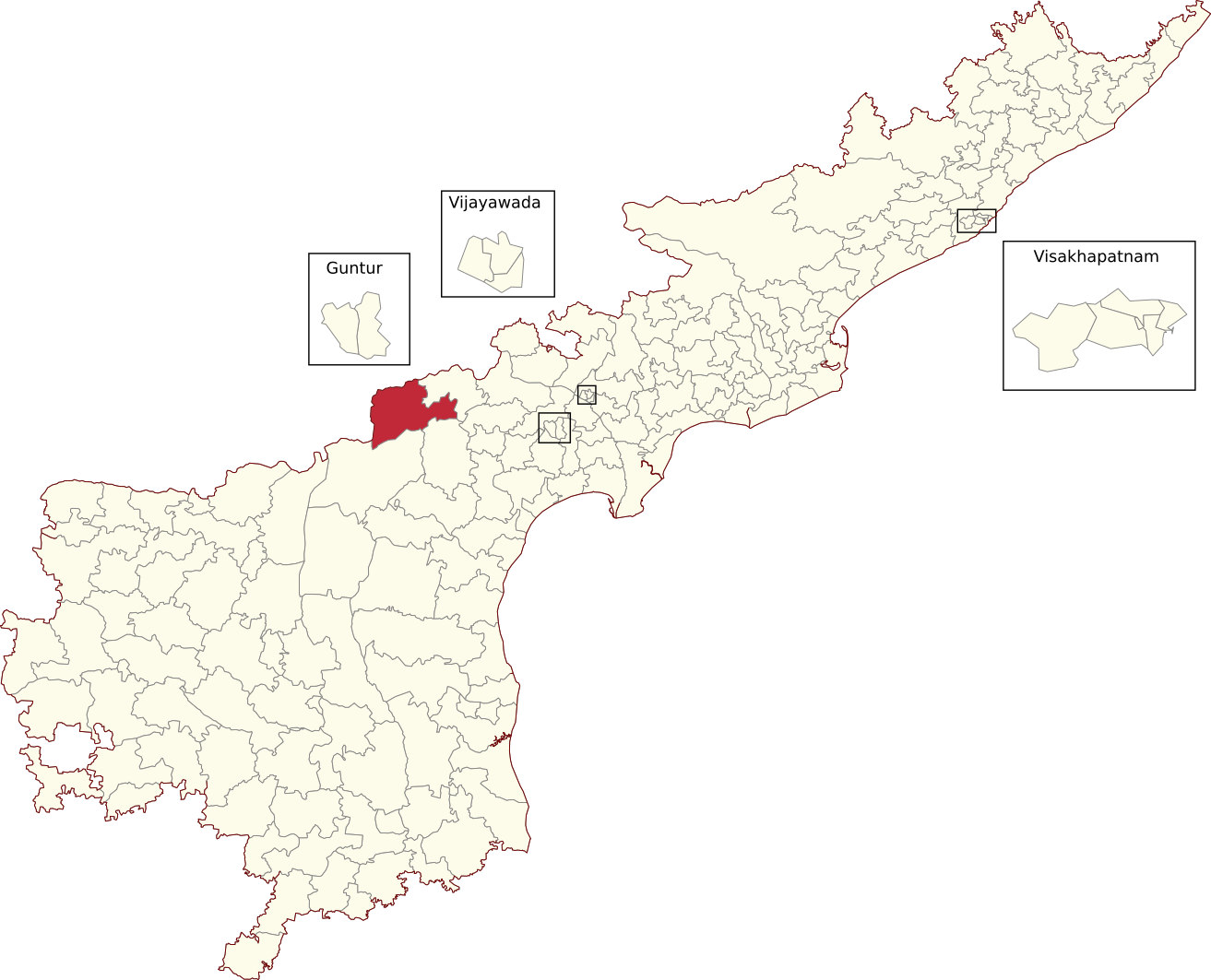
- Location of Macherla Assembly constituency within Andhra Pradesh

Constituency details
- Country: India
- Region: South India
- State: Andhra Pradesh
- District: Palnadu
- Lok Sabha constituency: Narasaraopet
- Established: 1955
- Total electors: 250,330
- Reservation: None

Member of Legislative Assembly
- 16th Andhra Pradesh Legislative Assembly
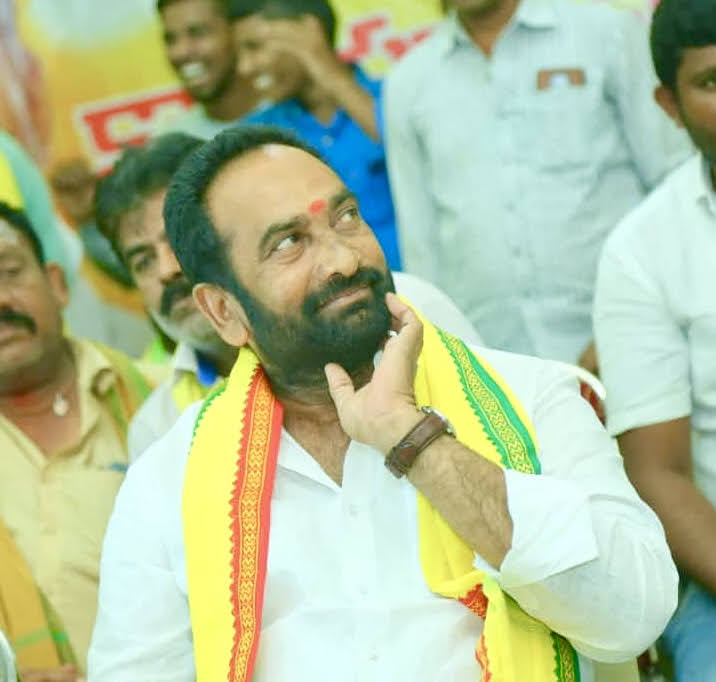
- Incumbent Julakanti Brahmananda Reddy
- Party: TDP
- Alliance: NDA
- Elected year: 2024

Macherla Assembly constituency is a constituency in Palnadu district of Andhra Pradesh that elects representatives to the Andhra Pradesh Legislative Assembly in India. It is one of the seven assembly segments of Narasaraopet Lok Sabha constituency.

Julakanti Brahmananda Reddy is the current MLA of the constituency, having won the 2024 Andhra Pradesh Legislative Assembly election from Telugu Desam Party. He clinched victory with a record-breaking majority of 33,318 votes, marking the highest margin in the history of Macherla thus far. Additionally, this stands as the largest majority in General Elections within Palnadu district. As of 2019, there are a total of 250,330 electors in the constituency. The constituency was established in 1955, as per the Delimitation Orders (1955).

== Mandals ==
Mandal
Macherla
Veldurthi
Durgi
Rentachintala
Karempudi

Mandals in Macherla Assembly Constituency

== Members of the Legislative Assembly ==
Year	Member	Party
1955	Mandapati Nagi Reddy	Communist Party of India
1962	Mudavathu Kesavanayakudu	Indian National Congress
1967	Venna Linga Reddy	Indian National Congress
1972	Julakanti Nagireddy	Independent
1978	Challa Narapa Reddy	Indian National Congress (I)
1983	Korrapati Subba Rao	Telugu Desam Party
1985	Nattuva Krishnamurthy	Indian National Congress
1989	Nimmagadda Sivarama Krishnaprasad	Telugu Desam Party
1994	Kurri Punna Reddy (Palnadu Puli)	Telugu Desam Party
1999	Julakanti Durgamba	Telugu Desam Party
2004	Pinnelli Laxma Reddy	Indian National Congress
2009	Pinnelli Ramakrishna Reddy	Indian National Congress
2012	Pinnelli Ramakrishna Reddy	YSR Congress Party
2014	Pinnelli Ramakrishna Reddy	YSR Congress Party
2019	Pinnelli Ramakrishna Reddy	YSR Congress Party
2024	Julakanti Brahmananda Reddy	Telugu Desam Party

== Election results ==
=== 2024 ===
2024 Andhra Pradesh Legislative Assembly election: Macherla
Party	Candidate	Votes	%	±%
TDP	Julakanti Brahmananda Reddy	122,413	55.62	▲13.62
YSRCP	Pinnelli Ramakrishna Reddy	89,095	40.48	▼11.52
INC	Ramachandra Reddy Yeramala	2,237	1.02	
NOTA	None Of The Above	1,746	0.79	
Majority		33,318	15%	▲4.7
Turnout		2,19,763	83.75	▼1.21
Registered electors		2,62,404		
TDP gain from YSRCP		Swing	▲13.63	

=== 2019 ===
2019 Andhra Pradesh Legislative Assembly election: Macherla
Party	Candidate	Votes	%	±%
YSRCP	Pinnelli Ramakrishna Reddy	110,406	52	
TDP	Annapureddy Anji Reddy	88,488	42	
Majority		21,918	10.30%	
Turnout		212,733	84.96	
Registered electors		250,403		
YSRCP hold		Swing		

=== 2014 ===
2014 Andhra Pradesh Legislative Assembly election: Macherla
Party	Candidate	Votes	%	±%
YSRCP	Pinnelli Ramakrishna Reddy	94,249	48.96	
TDP	Kommareddy Chalama Reddy	90,714	47.12	
Majority		3,535	1.84	
Turnout		193,482	81.21	+5.89
Registered electors		238,236		
YSRCP hold		Swing		

=== 2012 ===
2012 Andhra Pradesh Legislative Assembly by-election: Macherla
Party	Candidate	Votes	%	±%
YSRCP	Pinnelli Ramakrishna Reddy	79,751		
TDP	Chirumamilla Madhu Babu	64,272		
Majority		15,479		
Turnout				
YSRCP gain from INC		Swing		

=== 2009 ===
2009 Andhra Pradesh Legislative Assembly election: Macherla
Party	Candidate	Votes	%	±%
INC	Pinnelli Ramakrishna Reddy	66,953	44.03	−16.95
TDP	Julakanti Brahmananda Reddy	58720	37.60	+3.20
PRP	Manganti Sudhakar	16,386	10.78	
Majority		9,785	6.43	
Registered electors		201,861		
Turnout		152,051	75.32	+5.28
INC hold		Swing		

=== 2004 ===
2004 Andhra Pradesh Legislative Assembly election: Macherla
Party	Candidate	Votes	%	±%
INC	Pinnelli Lakshma Reddy	70,354	60.97	
TDP	Julakanti Brahmananda Reddy	39688	34.39	
Majority		30666	26.58	
Turnout		115,396	70.06	+3.88
Registered electors		164,721		
INC gain from TDP		Swing		

=== 1999 ===
1999 Andhra Pradesh Legislative Assembly election: Macherla
Party	Candidate	Votes	%	±%
TDP	Julakanti Durgamba	54,128	50.18%	
INC	Pinnelli Laxma Reddy	52,177	48.37%	
Margin of victory		1,951	1.81%	
Turnout		111,933	68.67%	
Registered electors		163,006		
TDP hold		Swing		

=== 1994 ===
1994 Andhra Pradesh Legislative Assembly election: Macherla
Party	Candidate	Votes	%	±%
TDP	Kurri Punna Reddy	53,108	50.61%	
INC	Sundara Ramireddy Pinnelli	46,634	44.44%	
Margin of victory		6,474	6.17%	
Turnout		107,672	69.34%	
Registered electors		155,284		
TDP hold		Swing		

=== 1989 ===
1989 Andhra Pradesh Legislative Assembly election: Macherla
Party	Candidate	Votes	%	±%
TDP	Nimmagadda Sivarama Krishna Prasad	47,538	51.89%	
INC	Krishnamurthy Nattuva	42,761	46.68%	
Margin of victory		4,777	5.21%	
Turnout		94,644	62.78%	
Registered electors		150,744		
TDP gain from INC		Swing		

=== 1985 ===
1985 Andhra Pradesh Legislative Assembly election: Macherla
Party	Candidate	Votes	%	±%
INC	Krishnamurthy Nattuva	40,822	48.79%	
TDP	Jayaramaiah Vattikonda	39,118	46.76%	
Margin of victory		1,704	2.04%	
Turnout		84,702	71.05%	
Registered electors		119,215		
INC gain from TDP		Swing		

=== 1983 ===
1983 Andhra Pradesh Legislative Assembly election: Macherla
Party	Candidate	Votes	%	±%
TDP	Korrapati Subba Rao	45,206	65.49%	
INC	Challa Narapa Reddy	19,040	27.58%	
Margin of victory		26,166	37.91%	
Turnout		70,302	62.95%	
Registered electors		111,681		
TDP gain from INC(I)		Swing		

=== 1978 ===
1978 Andhra Pradesh Legislative Assembly election: Macherla
Party	Candidate	Votes	%	±%
INC(I)	Challa Narapa Reddy	27,350	39.52%	
JP	Karpurapu Kotaiah	21,958	31.73%	
INC	Julakanti Nagireddy	18,625	26.91%	
Margin of victory		5,392	7.79%	
Turnout		71,318	68.59%	
Registered electors		103,970		
INC(I) gain from Independent		Swing		

=== 1972 ===
1972 Andhra Pradesh Legislative Assembly election: Macherla
Party	Candidate	Votes	%	±%
Independent	Julakanti Nagireddy	36,738	58.96%	
INC	Venna Linga Reddy	25,569	41.04%	
Margin of victory		11,169	17.93%	
Turnout		63,704	69.35%	
Registered electors		91,858		
Independent gain from INC		Swing		

=== 1967 ===
1967 Andhra Pradesh Legislative Assembly election: Macherla
Party	Candidate	Votes	%	±%
INC	Venna Linga Reddy	23,277	41.72%	
Independent	Julakanti Nagireddy	23,197	41.58%	
Margin of victory		80	0.14%	
Turnout		58,929	68.19%	
Registered electors		86,420		
INC hold		Swing		

=== 1962 ===
1962 Andhra Pradesh Legislative Assembly election: Macherla (ST)
Party	Candidate	Votes	%	±%
INC	Muadavathu Kesavanayakudu	21,283	54.00%	
SWA	Madigani Devadattu	18,127	46.00%	
Margin of victory		3,156	8.01%	
Turnout		41,121	55.96%	
Registered electors		73,479		
INC gain from CPI		Swing		

=== 1955 ===
1955 Andhra State Legislative Assembly election: Macherla
Party	Candidate	Votes	%	±%
CPI	Mandapati Nagireddy	10,657	36.13%	
INC	Kurumula Rangamma	8,386	28.43%	
Margin of victory		2,271	7.70%	
Turnout		29,497	54.53%	
Registered electors		54,095		
INC win (new seat)				

== See also ==
- List of constituencies of Andhra Pradesh Legislative Assembly
