= Veldurthi, Kurnool district =

Veldurthi
- village
- Location in Andhra Pradesh, India Veldurthi (India)
- Coordinates: 15.5667°N 77.9167°E
- Country: India
- State: Andhra Pradesh
- District: Kurnool

Area
  - Total: 5 km^{2} (1.9 sq mi)
- Elevation: 347 m (1,138 ft)

Population (2011)
  - Total: 17,890
  - Density: 3,600/km^{2} (9,300/sq mi)

Languages
  - Official: Telugu
- Time zone: UTC+5:30 (IST)
- Postal code: 518216
- Vehicle registration: AP 21

Veldurthi is a village in Kurnool district of Andhra Pradesh, India.

== Geography ==
- Veldurthi is a village and mandal Head quarter in Kurnool District. Veldurthi is located on national highway 44 to the south of Kurnool City at a distance of 30 km.
- Co-ordinates 15.5667°N 77.9167°E.
- It has an average elevation of 347 meters (1141 feet).
- Handri Neeva Sujala Sravanthi [HNSS] canal passes through the Veldurthi.
- Veldurthi mandal is bounded with Kallur Mandal on north, Bethamcherla and Orvakal mandals on east, Krishnagiri and Kodumur mandals on west, Dhone Mandal on South.

== Administration ==
Veldurthi has Grama panchayat grade in Municipality. As per constitution of India and Panchayat Raj Act, Veldurthi village is administrated by Sarpanch (Head of Village) who is elected representative of village.

Veldurthi comes under Pattikonda Assembly Constituency and Kurnool Parliament Constituency. The present Pattikonda MLA K.E.Shyam Kumar is from Veldurthi.

It comes under Kurnool Revenue Division.

== Demographics ==
The Veldurthi town has population of 17890 of which 8804 are males while 9086 are females as per Population Census 2011.

Average Sex Ratio of Veldurthi town is 1032 which is higher than Andhra Pradesh state average of 993.

== Economy ==
Main source of income for majority of the people is from Agriculture. Few industries are also present, such as Limestone, Stone Polishing etc. In Ramallakota village Iron ores are present. Small scale mining is going in Ramallakota.

== Transport ==
Veldurthy is very well connected by road as NH-44 passes through the town. State Highway 31 also passes through Veldurthi which connects Velugodu - Gadivemula - Kalvabugga - Veldurthi - Krishnagiri - P Kota Konda - Edula Devara Banda.

APSRTC Depots of Dhone and Kurnool -1 operate buses to Veldurthi. Buses are frequently available to Dhone, Kurnool and Kodumur and Time Bounded services to Bethamcherla and Krishnagiri.

=== Distance from Major Towns and cities from veldurthi ===
1. Dhone = 17 km
2. Kurnool = 33 km
3. Nandyal = 60 km
4. Pattikonda = 75 km
5. Anantapuram = 105 km
6. Hyderabad = 240 km
7. Bengaluru = 320 km

Veldurthi has Railway Station which is in Kacheguda - Dhone Jn line. It comes under Hyderabad Railway Division of SCR Zone.

== Education ==
Government and Private High Schools are present in Town. AP residential school also present in veldurthi.

Government Junior college also present in Veldurthi.

Some Private Degree colleges are also present in veldurthi.

== Climate ==
Climate in veldurthi is moderate. In extreme Summer Temp may reach 42 degree celsius. Rainfall here is moderate.
