= Julakanti Brahmananda Reddy =

Indian politician

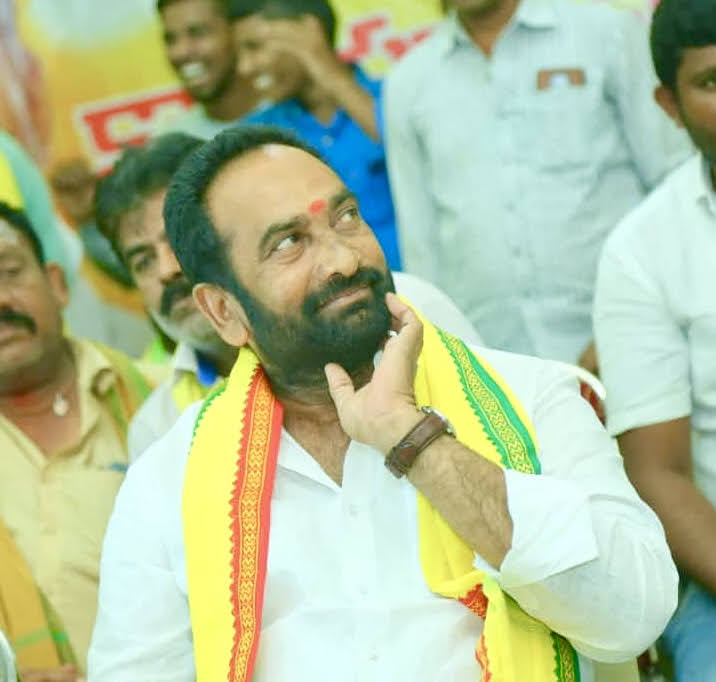

Member of the Andhra Pradesh Legislative Assembly
- Incumbent
- Assumed office 2024
- Preceded by: Pinnelli Ramakrishna Reddy
- Constituency: Macherla

Personal details
- Born: 18 April 1964 (age 62) Veldurthi,Veldurthi Mandalam, Guntur district (now Palnadu district), Andhra Pradesh
- Party: Telugu Desam Party
- Parents: Julakanti Nagi Reddy (father); Julakanti Durgamba (mother)
- Occupation: Politician

Julakanti Brahmananda Reddy (born 1964) is an Indian politician from Andhra Pradesh. He is MLA of Telugu Desam Party from Macherla Assembly Constituency in Palnadu district. In June 2024, he became MLA for the Macherla Assembly constituency following the 2024 Andhra Pradesh Legislative Assembly Election.

== Career ==
Reddy stood for the Telugu Desam Party as MLA for the Macherla Assembly constituency and lost in 2004 and 2009. He is the current MLA of the constituency, having won the 2024 Andhra Pradesh Legislative Assembly election from Telugu Desam Party with a highest recorded majority of 33,318 votes in Macherla Constituency.

== Personal life ==
Reddy is the son of Julakanti Nagi Reddy and Julakanti Durgamba, who were the former MLA's from the Macherla Assembly constituency.

== Electoral statistics ==
S.No	Year	Constituency	Party	Votes	Vote %	Margin	Result
1	2004	Macherla	TDP	39,688	34.39	-30,666	Lost
2	2009	Macherla	TDP	58,720	37.60	-9,785	Lost
3	2024	Macherla	TDP	1,22,413	55.62	33,318	Won
