= Rayavaram, Mahbubnagar district =

Rayavaram
- village
- Country: India
- State: Telangana

Languages
  - Official: Telugu
- Time zone: UTC+5:30 (IST)
- Vehicle registration: AP

Raya-varam is a village in the district of Mahbubnagar in the state of Telangana, India.
