= Battle of Palnadu =

12th-century battle in Southern India

The Battle of Palnadu took place sometime in the years 1178–1182 CE, between a Haihaya king called Nalagamaraju, who ruled the then Gurazala kingdom, and his step-brother Malidevaraju who ruled the then Macherla kingdom. Nalagamaraju was supported by Nayakuralu Nagamma while Malidevaraju was supported by Palanati Brahmanaidu| alias Seelam Brahmanaidu from Velama Caste. The story, as presented in both oral and written narratives, is largely corroborated by inscriptional records.

== Background ==
Palnadu is a region located in Palnadu district and covering some part of Prakasam district. It is spread over the present-day areas of Macherla, Karampudi, Gurazala and Narasaraopeta in the Palnadu district and Markapur in the Prakasam district of the state of Andhra Pradesh, India.

When Anuguraju of the Haihayas migrated to the Andhra area from Jabalpur in Madhya Pradesh, he clashed with the Velanati Chodas of Velanadu who ruled from Chandavolu. Velanati Gonkaraju installed Anuguraju as king of Palnadu at Gurajala after giving his daughter Mailama Devi to him in marriage. As Anuguraju was non-Telugu-speaking and had migrated to Andhra area only at that time, and unfamiliar with the local people, Gonkaraju appointed Seelam Dodda Naidu of Recherla Gotra as his minister to guide him. Anugu Raju had 2 more wives, Viravidya Devi and Bhoorama Devi. Anuguraju was however childless and adopted the eldest son of his minister Dodda Naidu. Soon after this Mailama Devi gave birth to a son called Nalagamaraju. Disillusioned with the turn of events, Dodda Naidu stepped down as minister of Anuguraju and appointed his younger son Brahma Naidu as a minister instead. Nalagamaraju became king after Anuguraju.

Nalagamaraju had a step-brother called Malidevaraju who married a princess from the Kalachuris of Kalyanadurga in Karnataka. Brahma Naidu was highly respected in his time and was a warrior, scholar and reformer. Brahmanaidu captured the fort of Shimoga from the Veera Saivaites on the request of the King of Kalyani. The king in turn married his daughter Sirimadevi to Malidevaraju. Brahma Naidu was a staunch Vaishnavaite and founded a new sect called Veera Vaishnavism as against Veera Saivism which was prevalent then and which allowed the Sudras including untouchables. Brahma Naidu allowed equal status to the untouchables. The social reforms like Chapa Koodu (having food sitting side by side on a mat irrespective of class) initiated by Brahma Naidu antagonized the orthodox people of the Palnadu society. Brahma Naidu did not stop with Chapakoodu and in this he was centuries ahead of the present day social reformers. He had people from all castes in his army. In fact, Kannamanedu from the untouchable was treated almost like Brahma Naidu's own son and was made the commander of his army.

The orthodox people found an able leader in one lady named Nagamma who was known as Nayakuralu. Nagamma joined the court of Nalagamaraju and gained his confidence. Thereafter, she made Nalagamarju displace Brahma Naidu's men from key positions. The differences in the court and the royal family grew which led to the division of the Kingdom.

Nalagamaraju's half brother Malidevaraju moved to Macherla and set up a separate kingdom there. Brahma Naidu moved to Macherla along with Malidevaraju.

Mutual suspicion between the two kingdoms grew and Nagamma under the pretext of Malideva's defeat in a cockfight exiled them for 7 years from Palnadu. After the exile Brahma Naidu sent Alaraju the brother in law of Malidevaraju to claim Malidevaraju's share. The demand was turned down and Alaraju was poisoned in Cherlagudipadu by the orders of Nagamma. His wife Perindevi committed Sati with Alaraju. This enraged Malidevaraju and Kommaraju who was the father of Alaraju. Brahma Naidu then declared war on Gurajala.

== Battle ==
The battle was fought at Karempudi on the banks of the river. Nalagamaraju was supported by the Kakatiyas, Hoysalas and Paricchedis. Malidevaraju was supported by the Kalachuris of Kalyanadurga.

Nalagamaraju's side was victorious and Malidevaraju died during the battle. Brahma Naidu was forced to reinstate Nalagamaraju. Balachandrudu, the son of Brahma Naidu, along with his wife Manchala, and a whole generation of Andhra warriors perished in the battle. This battle weakened the Velnati Chodas, and this later helped the Kakatiyas to take over their domain.
