= Gangavadi =

Historical region in Karnataka, India

Gangavadi is a historical region in southern Karnataka, India, corresponding broadly to the present-day districts of Mysuru, Mandya, and Chamarajanagar. It formed the heartland of the Western Ganga dynasty (c. 350–1000 CE) and retained its identity under later dynasties such as the Cholas, Hoysalas, and the Vijayanagara Empire. The name is preserved in inscriptions, literary references, and local tradition, though it is no longer used as an administrative division.

== History ==
The term Gangavadi originally referred to the territories ruled by the Western Ganga dynasty, whose capital was initially at Kolar and later at Talakad on the banks of the Kaveri River. The region roughly covered parts of present-day Mysuru, Mandya, Chamarajanagar, and surrounding areas.

After the decline of the Gangas in the 10th century, the region came under the control of the Cholas, followed by the Hoysalas in the 12th century. Inscriptions from the Hoysala and Vijayanagara periods continued to use the name Gangavadi to denote the southern Karnataka region.

== Cultural significance ==
Gangavadi was an important center for Jainism under the Western Gangas, who patronized Jain monasteries and commissioned monuments such as the famous Gommateshwara statue at Shravanabelagola. The region also witnessed the flourishing of early Kannada literature, temple architecture, and land grants recorded in numerous stone and copper-plate inscriptions.

== See also ==
- Western Ganga dynasty
- Talakad
- Shravanabelagola
