= Arjunwad =

Village in Maharashtra

- Village
- Country: India
- State: Maharashtra
- District: Kolhapur
- Taluka: Shirol

Government
  - Type: Panchayati raj (India)
  - Body: Gram panchayat

Languages
  - Official: Marathi
- Time zone: UTC+5:30 (IST)
- Postal code: 591309
- ISO 3166 code: IN-kar
- Website: maharashtra.nic.in

Arjunwad is a village in Kolhapur district in the Northern state of Karnataka, India.

== Transport ==
From Mumbai and Pune, take NH4 national highway to Peth by the state highway 138 to Sangli. Then travel by state highway SH75 from Sangli to Arjunwad. Arjunwad is 15 km from Sangli city.

Nearest railway junction

- Miraj - 4 km

Miraj railway station is connected to major cities by express and super fast trains. You can take MSRTC city buses, auto rickshaws and private cars from Miraj to Arjunwad. Travel time is 15–20 minutes.

Other railway stations

- Sangli - 14 km,
- Jaysingpur - 7 km
- Narsobawadi - 10 km

Express trains traveling on Pune-Miraj-Bangalore main line stop at Miraj railway station. One can take MSRTC city buses, auto rickshaws and private cars from Miraj to Arjunwad. Travel time is 15–20 minutes.
