= Durgi, Palnadu district =

Durgi
- Village
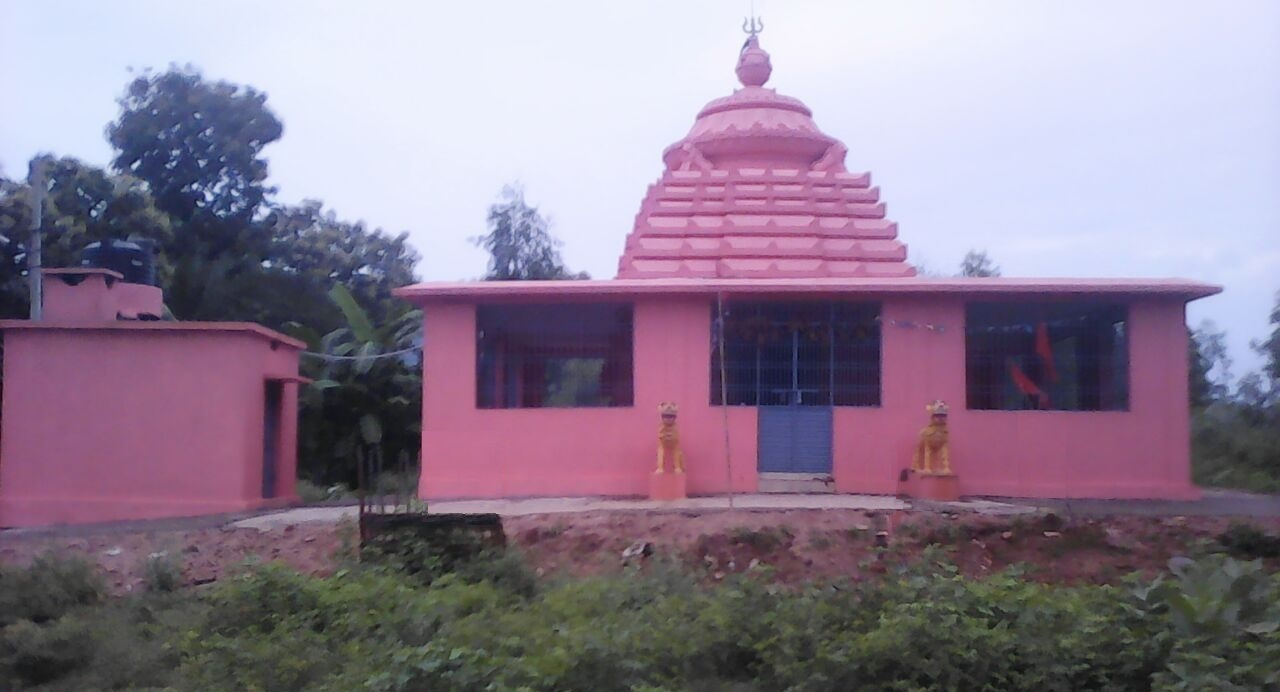
- Maa Gram Devi Temple
- Interactive map of Durgi
- Location in Andhra Pradesh, India
- Coordinates: 16°25′43″N 79°32′26″E
- Country: India
- State: Andhra Pradesh
- District: Palnadu
- Mandal: Durgi

Government
  - Type: Panchayati raj
  - Body: Durgi gram panchayat

Area
  - Total: 5,762 ha (14,240 acres)

Population (2011)
  - Total: 9,480
  - Density: 165/km^{2} (426/sq mi)

Languages
  - Official: Telugu
- Time zone: UTC+5:30 (IST)
- PIN: 522612
- Area code: +91–863
- Vehicle registration: AP

Durgi is a village in Palnadu district of the Indian state of Andhra Pradesh. It is the mandal headquarters of Durgi mandal in Gurazala revenue division. Durgi is named after a Durga temple in the village and is renowned for its stone carving tradition that began in the 15th century with the use of soft limestone. Though many artisans were relocated during the Nagarjuna Sagar project, the craft survives today through the production of simpler items like lampshades and paperweights.

== Geography ==
Durgi is situated at 16.4401661°N 79.6235407°E. It is spread over an area of 5,762 ha (14,240 acres).

== Governance ==
Durgi gram panchayat is the local self-government of the village. It is divided into wards and each ward is represented by a ward member.

== Culture ==
Durgi is named after a Durga temple, located on the eastern part of the village. The temple is known for its centuries-old stone carving tradition. The craft began in the 15th century when local sculptors started using soft limestone instead of granite. Many artisans from this village were relocated here during the construction of Nagarjuna Sagar reservoir. Today, the craft still survived, with artisans now making simpler items like lampshades and paperweights for wider markets.

== Education ==
As per the school information report for the academic year 2018–19, the village has 6 MPP, one KGBV, one model and 7 private schools.
