= Reningavaram (J. Panguluru mandal) =

- village
- Interactive map of Reningavaram
- Location in Andhra Pradesh, India
- Country: India
- State: Andhra Pradesh

Languages
  - Official: Telugu
- Time zone: UTC+5:30 (IST)
- Vehicle registration: AP

Reningavaram is a village in the district of Prakasam in the state of Andhra Pradesh, India.
