= Tallapalle =

- Census Town
- Location in Telangana, India Tallapalle (India)
- Coordinates: 18°06′57″N 78°34′12″E
- Country: India
- State: Telangana
- District: Adilabad

Area
  - Total: 12.08 km^{2} (4.66 sq mi)

Population (2011)
  - Total: 9,656
  - Density: 799.3/km^{2} (2,070/sq mi)

Languages
  - Official: Telugu
- Time zone: UTC+5:30 (IST)
- Vehicle registration: TS
- Website: telangana.gov.in

Tallapalle is a census town located in Adilabad district in the Indian state of Telangana.

== Demographics ==
As of 2001 India census, Tallapalle had a population of 10,937. Males constitute 52% of the population and females 48%. Tallapalle has an average literacy rate of 56%, lower than the national average of 59.5%: male literacy is 63%, and female literacy is 47%. In Tallapalle, 11% of the population is under 6 years of age.
