= Bijjala II =

King of the Southern Kalachuris from 1130 to 1167

- Samrat
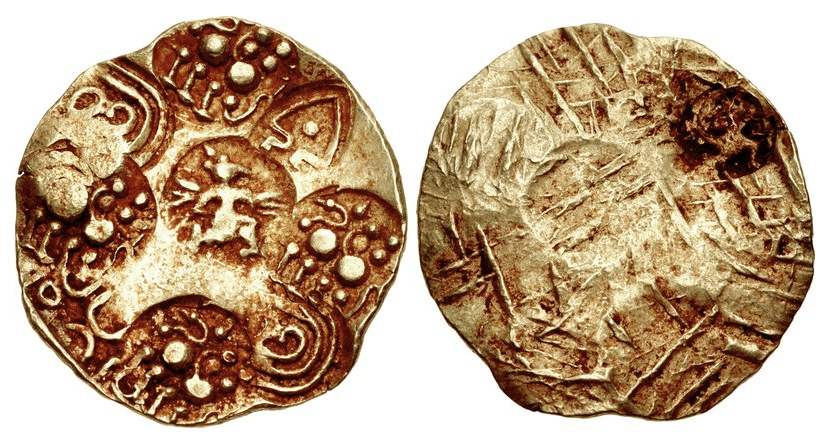
- Coinage of the Kalachuris of Kalyana, from the time of Bijjala

King of the Southern Kalachuris
- Reign: c. 1130 – c. 1167
- Predecessor: Permadi
- Successor: Sovideva
- Dynasty: Kalachuri Dynasty
- Religion: Jainism

Bijjala II (BijjalaDeva)(1130–1167 CE) was the Mahamandaleshwara of the Kalyani Chalukyas. He was the most famous of the southern Kalachuri kings who ruled initially as a vassal of Chalukya Vikramaditya VI. He ruled as the Mahamandalesvara (chief or governor) over Karhada-4000 and Tardavadi-1000 provinces, designations given to territories within the larger Western Chalukya kingdom.

He revolted against the Western Chalukya Empire, assumed imperial titles in 1157, and ruled along with his successors, the Deccan Plateau for a quarter of a century.

== Bijjala's opportunism ==
After the death of Vikramaditya VI, seeing the weakening empire, Bijjala II declared independence. The Chikkalagi inscription refers to Bijjala as Mahabhujabalachakravarti, which in Sanskrit literally means the great great (maha) unopposed ruler (cakravartin) with strong (bala) arms (bhuja). By the time of Chalukya Taila III, Bijjala's attempts towards independence seems to have spread to other feudatories as well. Kakatiya Prola II broke free of Chalukya rule in the middle of the 12th century. By 1162 CE. Bijjala II had managed to drive Taila III out of Kalyani, the Chalukya capital. He assumed Chalukyan titles like Sriprithvivallabha and Parameshvara. He shifted his capital from Mangalavada to Kalyani also known as Basavakalyan.

== Religion ==
Bijjala II was a follower of Jainism, as were many of his Kalachuri predecessors. Inscriptions and literary records indicate that he patronized Jain acharyas and issued land grants to Jain temples. Jainism was an influential religion in his court, and he maintained close connections with Jain monastic traditions.

His reign also coincided with the emergence of the Virashaiva (Lingayat) movement under the leadership of Basavanna, who served as his Mahamāṭraka (prime minister). Though Bijjala remained personally committed to Jainism, he allowed Basava to promote his reformist ideas and establish the Anubhava Mantapa.

Conflicts later arose between orthodox groups and some Lingayat followers, and Bijjala Deva was assassinated in 1167 CE, reportedly by Radical Sharanas Groups. This Ultimately led to political instability in Kalyani.

== Death ==
His rule was marked with turbulence, both domestic and social. According to the historian Dr. P.B. Desai, Bijjala II became very unpopular with the followers of Basava and was assassinated by them. Dr. Desai however does confirm that Basava himself was not responsible for this incident. He was succeeded by his younger son Sovideva to the throne.

== Bibliography ==
- Dr. Suryanath U. Kamat (2001). Concise History of Karnataka, MCC, Bangalore (Reprinted 2002)
