= Nayakuralu Nagamma =

Nayakuralu Nagamma was a 12th-century renowned statesperson and minister to King Nalagama, who held the power of kingdom in her hands, under the ruler of Palanadu in Guntur District. She is one of the key characters, along with Bramha Naidu, in the epic war - Palnati Yudham (War of Palnad) set in the medieval Andhra Pradesh, a southern state of India.
