= Palnadu =

Region of Andhra Pradesh, India

Palnadu is a region located in Palnadu district and covering a portion of Prakasam district in Andhra Pradesh, India. It is spread over the revenue divisions of Gurazala and Narasaraopeta in Palnadu district and Markapur in Prakasam district.

== History ==
The region is most notable for the Battle of Palnadu that was fought under the leadership of Brahma Naidu and Nagamma and their warriors.

In January 2020, the Government of Andhra Pradesh approved making the region a district. Narasaraopet and Gurazala were purported to be the choices for the district headquarters.

== Geography ==
The region comprises hills and mostly stony areas which has minerals such as limestone and granite. Narasaraopet in Palnadu district is considered as 'Gateway of Palnadu'.
