= Kalachuris of Kalyani =

Indian dynasty

- 1156–1183
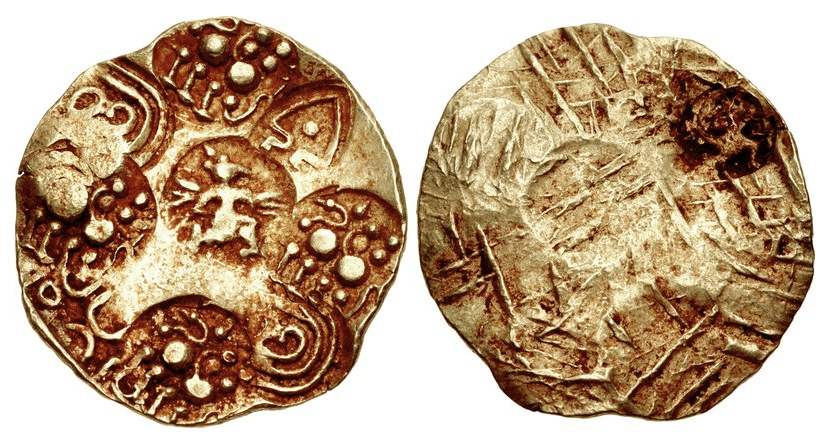
- Coinage of the Kalachuris of Kalyana, from the time of Bijjala
- Capital: Kalyani (Basavakalyana)
- Common languages: Kannada; Sanskrit
- Religion: Jainism (primary); Hinduism
- Government: Absolute monarchy
- History
  - Established: 1156–1183
Preceded by	Succeeded by
Western Chalukya Empire	Seuna (Yadava) dynasty; Hoysala Kingdom

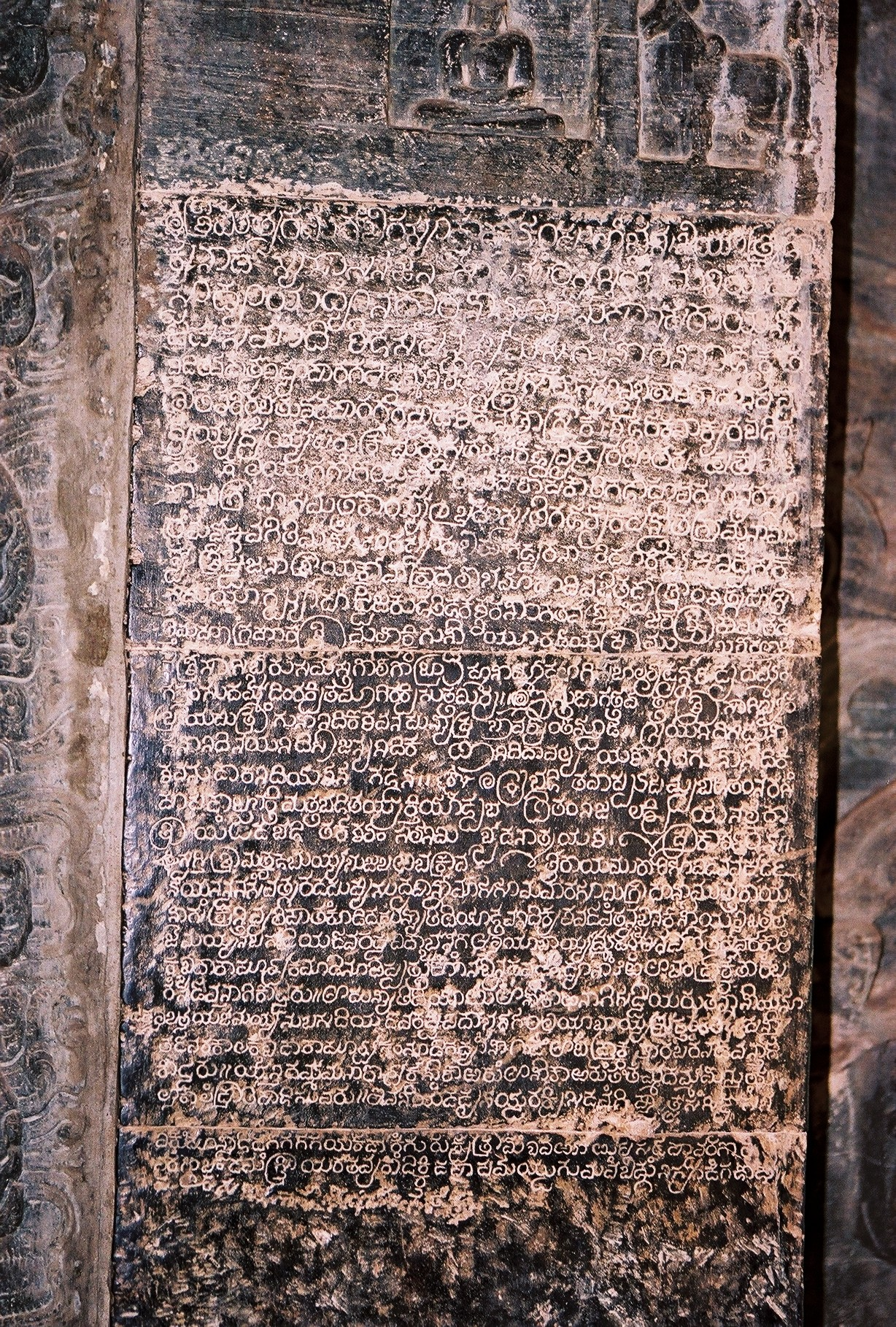
Old Kannada inscription of Rayamuri Sovideva dated 1172 CE at the Jain temple in Lakkundi, Gadag district, Karnataka state

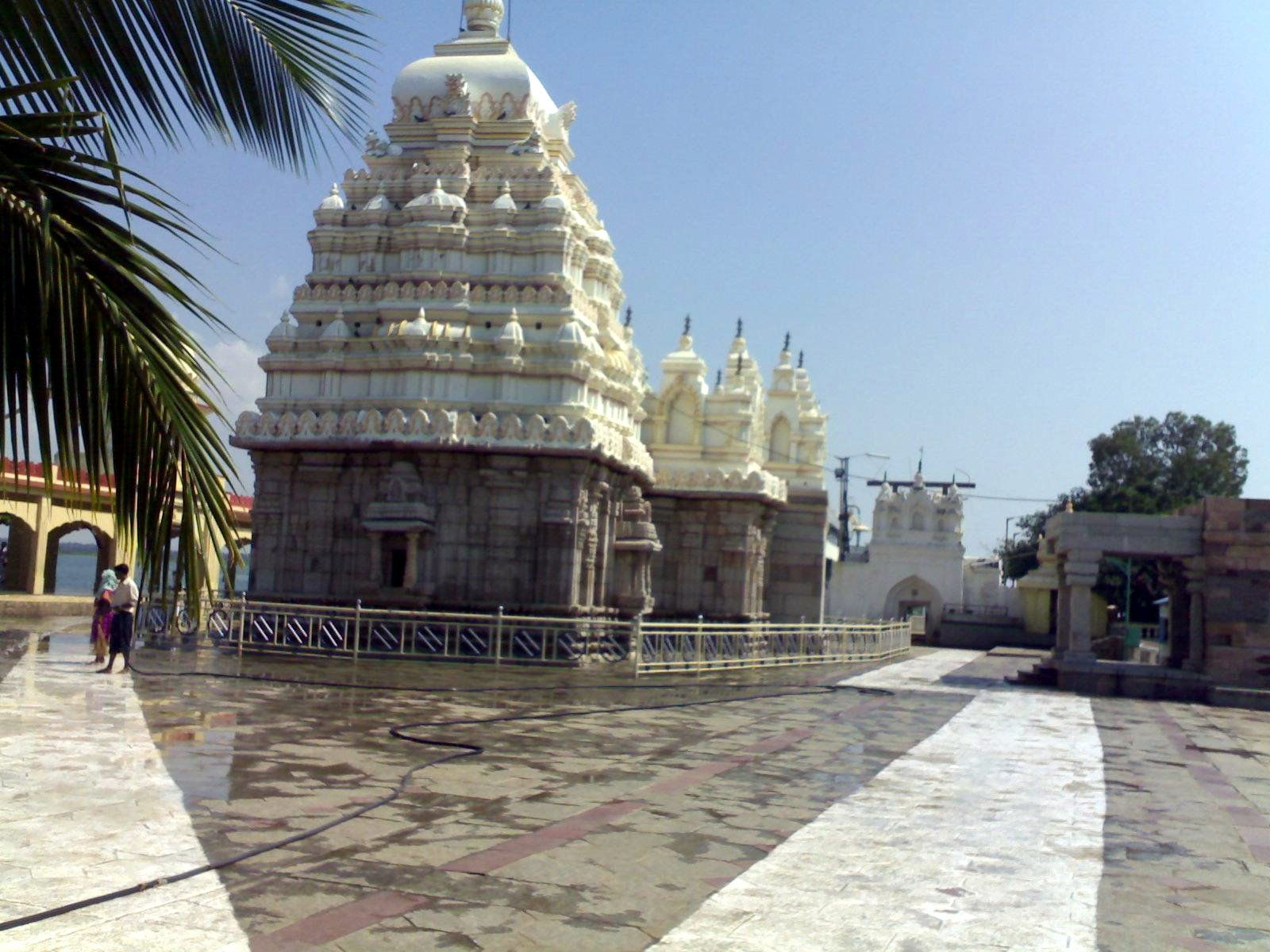
Sangamanatha temple at Kudalasangama, North Karnataka

The Kalachuris of Kalyani, also Southern Kalachuris, were a 10th-12th-century Indian dynasty, who ruled over parts of present-day northern Karnataka and Maharashtra. This dynasty rose to its peak power in the Deccan region between 1156 and 1183.

The rulers of the dynasty traced their origins to one Krishna, who is said to have conquered Kalinjar and Dahala in present-day Madhya Pradesh (see Kalachuris of Tripuri). Bijjala, a viceroy of the dynasty, is said to have established the authority over Karnataka after wresting power from the Chalukya king Taila III. Bijjala was succeeded by his sons Someshvara and Sangama but after 1183 CE, the Chalukyas gradually retrieved the territory. Their rule was short and turbulent and yet very important from a socio-religious point of view; a new sect known as the Lingayat or Virashaiva sect was founded during these times in a time extent of 25 years.

A unique and purely native form of Kannada literature-poetry called the Vachanas was also born during this time. The writers of Vachanas were called Vachanakaras (poets). Many other important works like Virupaksha Pandita's Chennabasavapurana, Dharani Pandita's Bijjalarayacharite and Chandrasagara Varni's Bijjalarayapurana were also written.

== History ==
=== Origin ===
The Kalachuris of Kalyani overthrew the Kalyani Chalukyas in the early part of the 12th century, and had a relatively short but stormy rule. The name "Kalachuri" is shared by multiple earlier dynasties, two of which ruled in central India. Some historians such as Dr. P.B. Desai believe that the southern Kalachuris of Kalyani are descendants of these central Indian dynasties. In the 6th century, before the rise of the Badami Chalukyas, the Kalachuris of Mahishmati had carved out an extensive empire covering areas of Gujarat, Malwa, Konkan and parts of Maharashtra. However, after their crippling defeat at the hands of Chalukya Mangalesha, they remained in obscurity for a prolonged period of time. Subsequently, the Kalachuris of Tripuri and their branches rose to power in central India.

An 1174 CE record says the Kalyani Kalachuri dynasty was founded by one Soma who grew beard and moustache to save himself from the wrath of Parashurama, and thereafter the family came to be known as "Kalachuris", Kalli meaning a long moustache and churi meaning a sharp knife. They migrated to the south and made Magaliveda or Mangalavedhe (Mangalavada) their capital. They titled themselves Kalanjara-puravaradhisvara ("Lord of Kalanjara"), which indicates their central Indian origin. Their emblem was Suvarna Vrishabha or the golden bull. They must have started as modest feudatories of the Chalukyas of Kalyani. They were also referred to as Katachuris (shape of a sharp knife) and Haihaya (or Heheya).

The later records of the dynasty claim that they descended from Brahma, the Creator of the universe.

=== Religion ===
Prof., Ramaswami Ayangar asserts:

Many Pallava and Pandya records describe how the Kalabharas attacked the Tamil country, defeated the Cholas, Cheras, and Pandyas, and established their kingdom. Prof., Ramaswami Ayangar asserts that these valiant Kalabhara kings were the devoted followers of Jainism. Basically, The Kalachuri kings were followers of Jainism He proved it on the basis of copper plate of Veluikundi and The "Pāṇḍyapurāṇam" of tamil language. Shri Ayangar presumes that the Kalabharas were a branch of the Kalachuri clan and that Jainism flourished after their arrival in the Tamil country. The Kalachuri kings themselves were known supporters of Jainism, The Kalachuri kings of Madhya Pradesh were related to the Rashtrakutas through familial ties. and the Rashtrakutas were originally Jain rulers. The influence of Jainism during the reign of the Kalachuris of Kalyani was notable. The prominent king Bijjala and several of his statesmen actively patronised Jainism. Bijjala and his minister Rechmayya set up an image of the Tirthankara Shantinath at Shravanabelagola.

=== Decline ===
The Southern Kaluchuri kingdom went into decline after the assassination of Bijalla. The rulers who followed were weak and incompetent, with the exception of Sovideva, who managed to maintain control over the kingdom. Western Chalukyas ended the Kalachuri Dynasty. Many Kalachuri families migrated to Kanara districts of Karnataka. The Kalachuris are the principal characters in the Andhra epic Palnati Veera Charitra, as the in-laws of the king Malidevaraju.

== Rulers ==
- Uchita
- Asaga
- Kannam
- Kiriyasaga
- Bijjala I
- Kannama
- Jogama
- Permadi
- Bijjala II (1130–1167): proclaimed independence in 1162.
- Sovideva (1168–1176)
- Mallugi; overthrown by brother Sankama
- Sankama (1176–1180)
- Ahavamalla (1180–1183)
- Singhana (1183–1184)

== Inscriptions and coinage ==
As per the 1163 CE inscription which records a religious offering (mahadana) in the presence of Hampi Lord Virupaksha by Bijjala the Kalachuri King.

The Southern Kalachuri kings minted coins with Kannada inscriptions on them.
