= Veldurthi, Palnadu district =

Veldurthi
- Village
- Interactive map of Veldurthi
- Location in Andhra Pradesh, India
- Coordinates: 16.35°N 79.3667°E
- Country: India
- State: Andhra Pradesh
- District: Palnadu
- Mandal: Veldurthi

Government
  - Type: Panchayati raj
  - Body: Veldurthi gram panchayat

Area
  - Total: 4,705 ha (11,630 acres)

Population (2011)
  - Total: 4,552
  - Density: 96.75/km^{2} (250.6/sq mi)

Languages
  - Official: Telugu
- Time zone: UTC+5:30 (IST)
- PIN: 522615
- Area code: +91–863
- Vehicle registration: AP

Veldurthy is a village in Palnadu district of the Indian state of Andhra Pradesh. It is located in Veldurthi mandal of Gurazala revenue division.

== Geography ==
Veldurthy is located at 16.35°N 79.3667°E. Jerri Vagu is the source of water for the village and its surrounding areas.

== Governance ==
Veldurthi gram panchayat is the local self-government of the village.
