= Rentachintala =

- Village
- Interactive map of Rentachintala
- Location in Andhra Pradesh, India
- Coordinates: 16.5525°N 79.5533°E
- Country: India
- State: Andhra Pradesh
- District: Palnadu
- Mandal: Rentachintala

Government
  - Type: Panchayati raj
  - Body: Rentachintala gram panchayat

Area
  - Total: 2,170 ha (5,400 acres)

Population (2011)
  - Total: 16,523
  - Density: 761/km^{2} (1,970/sq mi)

Languages
  - Official: Telugu
- Time zone: UTC+5:30 (IST)
- PIN: 522421
- Area code: 08642
- Vehicle registration: AP 07

Rentachintala is a village in Palnadu district of the Indian state of Andhra Pradesh. It is located in Rentachintala mandal of Gurazala revenue division.

== Geography and climate ==
Rentachintala is located near latitude 16.55 N and longitude 79.55 E. The village lies in the Krishna River plains, having an elevation of 130 metres (430 ft) above sea level. The nearest large water body is the Nagarjuna Sagar dam and reservoir, about 25 kilometres (16 mi) west of Rentachintala.

Rentachintala has a tropical wet and dry climate. The highest temperatures are experienced in the month of May, when the summer season is at its peak. The maximum temperature averages more than 40 degrees, occasionally reaching as high as 45 degrees. The highest temperature ever recorded is 48 degrees Celsius in 2012. Winters are pleasant, with occasional spells of rain from the northwest monsoon.

Climate data for Rentachintala (1991–2020, extremes 1936–2012)
Month	Jan	Feb	Mar	Apr	May	Jun	Jul	Aug	Sep	Oct	Nov	Dec	Year
Record high °C (°F)	37.4 (99.3)	40.6 (105.1)	44.4 (111.9)	46.6 (115.9)	49.9 (121.8)	47.9 (118.2)	42.2 (108.0)	40.1 (104.2)	42.1 (107.8)	41.0 (105.8)	37.0 (98.6)	35.6 (96.1)	49.9 (121.8)
Mean daily maximum °C (°F)	31.3 (88.3)	33.9 (93.0)	37.4 (99.3)	40.0 (104.0)	41.9 (107.4)	38.0 (100.4)	34.9 (94.8)	33.7 (92.7)	34.1 (93.4)	32.9 (91.2)	32.0 (89.6)	30.6 (87.1)	35.2 (95.4)
Mean daily minimum °C (°F)	17.0 (62.6)	19.1 (66.4)	23.0 (73.4)	25.7 (78.3)	28.2 (82.8)	27.2 (81.0)	26.1 (79.0)	25.3 (77.5)	25.4 (77.7)	24.0 (75.2)	20.8 (69.4)	17.4 (63.3)	23.3 (73.9)
Record low °C (°F)	7.3 (45.1)	9.4 (48.9)	15.0 (59.0)	14.7 (58.5)	18.3 (64.9)	20.0 (68.0)	19.2 (66.6)	16.5 (61.7)	18.8 (65.8)	16.0 (60.8)	12.2 (54.0)	10.0 (50.0)	7.3 (45.1)
Average rainfall mm (inches)	4.9 (0.19)	7.5 (0.30)	2.5 (0.10)	7.0 (0.28)	15.8 (0.62)	61.8 (2.43)	108.1 (4.26)	132.1 (5.20)	102.6 (4.04)	87.5 (3.44)	22.4 (0.88)	5.2 (0.20)	557.5 (21.95)
Average rainy days	0.4	0.5	0.3	0.6	1.0	3.7	7.0	7.8	6.7	4.7	1.4	0.4	34.5
Average relative humidity (%) (at 17:30 IST)	60	52	47	43	39	50	59	63	63	68	67	65	56
Source: India Meteorological Department

== Demographics ==
As of 2011 Census of India, Rentachintala has a total population of 16,523. Males constitute 51% and females constitute 49% of the population. The literacy rate in Retachintala is 55.46%, lower than the national average of 74.04%. Male literacy is at 63.33% and female literacy is at 47.27%. Less than 1% of the population at Rentachintala is below 6 years of age.

== Government and politics ==
Rentachintala gram panchayat is the local self-government of the village. It is divided into wards and each ward is represented by a ward member. The ward members are headed by a Sarpanch.

== In popular media and films ==
The village of Rentachintala is featured in Tollywood movie, dwrakalo em jarigindi dircoter of snsbsh
