= Gurazala revenue division =

- revenue division in Palnadu district
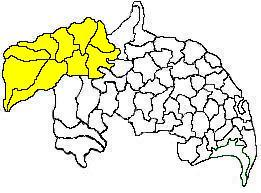
- Mandals in Gurazala revenue division (in yellow) of Guntur district
- Country: India
- State: Andhra Pradesh
- District: Palnadu

Gurazala revenue division is an administrative division in the Palnadu district of the Indian state of Andhra Pradesh. It is one of the three revenue divisions in the district, along with Sattenapalli and Narasaraopet formed in 2013 with nine mandals. On 4 April 2022, it has been restructured to contain nine mandals. Gurazala serves as the headquarters of the division.

== Mandals ==
The mandals in the revenue division are 9:

No.	Mandals
1	Gurajala mandal
2	Dachepalle mandal
3	Piduguralla mandal
4	Machavaram mandal
5	Macherla mandal
6	Veldurthi mandal
7	Durgi mandal
8	Rentachintala mandal
9	Karempudi mandal

== See also ==
- List of revenue divisions in Andhra Pradesh
