= Macherla =

- Town
- Location in Andhra Pradesh, India
- Coordinates: 16.48°N 79.43°E
- Country: India
- State: Andhra Pradesh
- District: Palnadu
- Founded: 2nd century
- Incorporated (town): 1983

Government
  - Type: Municipal council
  - Body: Macherla Municipality

Area
  - Total: 13.48 km^{2} (5.20 sq mi)
- Elevation: 136 m (446 ft)

Population (2011)
  - Total: 57,290
  - Density: 4,250/km^{2} (11,010/sq mi)

Languages
  - Official: Telugu
- Time zone: UTC+5:30 (IST)
- PIN: 522426
- Telephone code: 08642
- Website: macherla.cdma.ap.gov.in/en

Macherla is a town in Palnadu district of the Indian state of Andhra Pradesh. It is the headquarters of Macherla mandal in Gurazala revenue division.

== History ==
Macherla is capital of the region Palnadu. The name Macherla originated from Mahadevi Cherla. This town is in the heart of Palnadu, and has a history of over a thousand years. The famous battle Palnati Yudhdham (War of Palnadu) took place between Macherla and Gurazala between 1176 AD – 1182 AD. The Palnadu Battle is also called the Andhra Mahabharatam because of several similarities. The town is renowned for the Chennakesava Swamy temple built here during the reign of the Haihaya (clan of Yadavs) Kings. Brahmanaidu is the minister to Haihaya kings, who tried to abolish the caste system by "Chapa Koodu" or "Sahapankthi Bhojanalu" in the 12th century.

== Geography ==
Macherla is located at 16.48°N 79.43°E. It has an average elevation of 136 metres (446 feet). It is located 23 kilometers from Nagarjuna Sagar. Jerri Vagu is the source of water for the town and the surrounding villages.

== Demographics ==
As of 2011 census of India, the city had a population of 1,06,289. The average literacy rate stands at 71.13% with 86,176 literates, significantly higher than the state average of 67.41%.

== Governance and politics ==
=== Civic administration ===
Macherla Municipality is the civic body of the town and constituted in the year 1983. The municipality is classified as second grade and has a jurisdictional area of the municipality is present area of the corporation is 32.94 km^{2} (12.72 sq mi).

== Culture and tourism ==
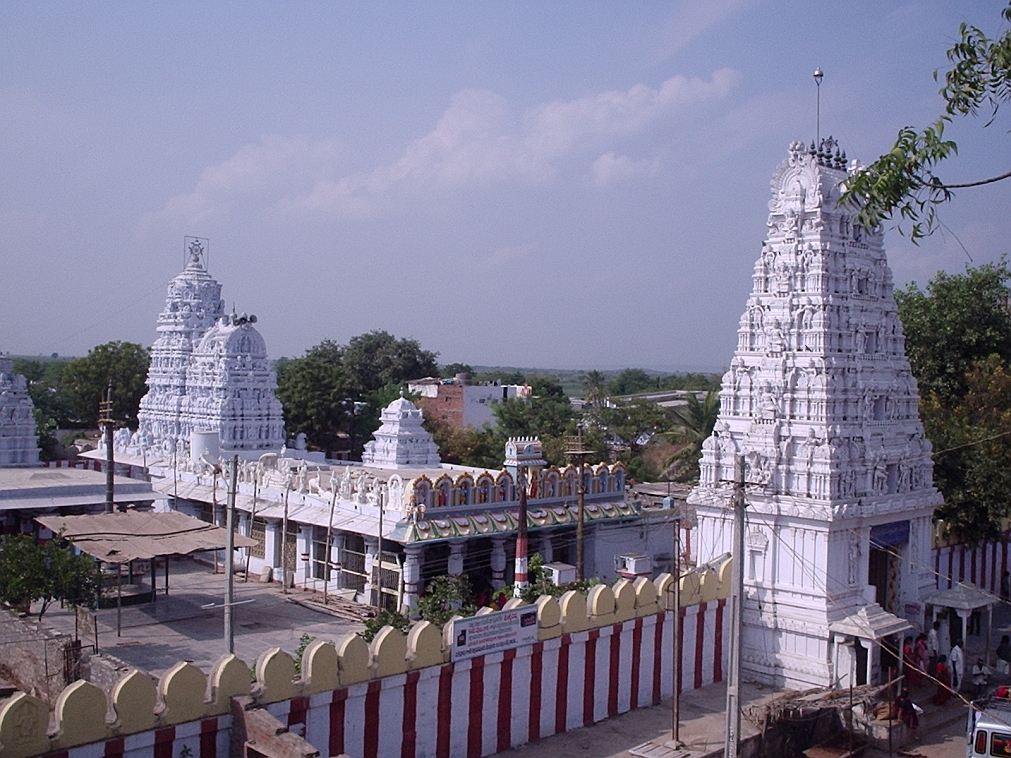
Sri Lakshmi Chennakesava swami temple

Nagarjunakonda Museum Nagarjunakonda, meaning the hill of Nagarjuna, was named after the Buddhist scholar and savant Acharya Nagarjuna. It was a great religious centre promoting Brahmanism and Buddhist faiths, moulding the early phases of art and architecture affiliated with them. The Ethipothala Falls lies 8 km from Macherla, is a mountain stream cascading down the hills as Chandravanka and Suryavanka streams. The Suryavanka falls from a height of 21 meters into a lagoon and joins River Krishna. The Sri Lakshmi Chennakesava swami temple hosts a yearly local festival, Tirunalla.

== Transport ==
The town has a total road length of 76.23 km (47.37 mi).

== Education ==
As per the school information report for the academic year 2018–19, the village has a total of 21 schools. These include 1 MPP, 1 KGBV and 19 private schools.
