= List of people from Karnataka =

This is a list of notable people from Karnataka, India. In order to be included, a person of influence needs only to have been born in Karnataka. This article can be expanded to accommodate newly surfacing information.

== Arts and entertainment ==
=== Cinema ===
- Ambareesh
- Anant Nag
- Aniruddha Jatkar
- Ananya Kasaravalli
- Anuradha Paudwal
- Arati Ankalikar Tikekar
- Arjun Sarja
- Aruna Balraj
- Aarathi
- Atul Kulkarni
- A. T. Raghu
- B. Saroja Devi
- B. C. Patil
- B. S. Ranga
- B. V. Karanth
- Bala
- Balakrishna
- Balaraj
- Bangalore Latha
- Bank Janardhan
- Bharathi Vishnuvardhan
- Bhargavi Narayan
- Bhavana
- Bhavani Prakash
- Bianca Desai
- Chandrika
- Chandulal Jain
- Chetan Kumar
- Darshan
- Daisy Bopanna
- Deepika Padukone
- Devaraj
- Dinesh
- Dingri Nagaraj
- Dwarakish
- Ere Gowda
- Ganesh
- Ganesh Hegde
- G. V. Iyer
- Geetha
- Girish Karnad
- Girish Kasaravalli
- Gulshan Devaiah
- Guru Dutt
- Hansika Motwani
- Harshika Poonacha
- Hema Bellur
- Hema Prabhath
- Honnavalli Krishna
- Jaggesh
- Jamuna
- Jayanth Kaikini
- Kalpana
- Kalyan Kumar
- Kashinath
- Keerthiraj
- Keerthi Bhat
- Krishna Kumari
- Kunigal Nagabhushan
- Lakshmi Chandrashekar
- Lakshmi Rai
- Leelavathi
- Leena Chandavarkar
- Lokesh
- M. S. Sathyu
- Madhuri Itagi
- Mandeep Roy
- Manjula
- Master Hirannaiah
- Master Manjunath
- Michael Madhu
- Mohan
- Mysore Lokesh
- Nagathihalli Chandrashekhar
- Narasimharaju
- Negro Johnny
- Nidhi Subbaiah
- Nirmala Chennappa
- Nishan Nanaiah
- Padma Vasanthi
- Padmaja Rao
- Pandari Bai
- Pattabhirama Reddy, settler
- Pooja Lokesh
- Pradeep Uppoor
- Prakash Raj
- Prabhu Deva, settler
- Pramila Joshai
- Prathap
- Prema
- Puneeth Rajkumar
- Puttanna Kanagal
- Raam Reddy
- Radhika Pandit
- Raghavendra Rajkumar
- Rajinikanth
- Rajesh Krishnan, settler
- Rajkumar
- Raju Sundaram, settler
- Raj B. Shetty
- Rakshita
- Ramesh Aravind
- Ram Kumar
- Ramu
- Ramya
- Ravichandran, settler
- Raju Talikote
- Rashmi
- Rekha Das
- Rockline Venkatesh
- Rohit Shetty
- Roopa Iyer, settler
- R. T. Rama
- Sarigama Viji
- Sakshi Shivanand
- Sanchita Shetty
- Sandeep Chowta
- Sanketh Kashi
- Sathyabhama
- Satyajith
- Shamita Shetty
- Shani Mahadevappa
- Shankar Nag
- Shanthamma
- Shashi Kumar
- Shiva Rajkumar
- Shilpa Shetty
- Shobaraj
- Shraddha Srinath
- Shruti Naidu
- Shylaja Nag
- Sihi Kahi Chandru
- Sihi Kahi Geetha
- Sneha Ullal
- Soundarya
- Sowcar Janaki
- Srinivas Prabhu
- Sudha Baragur
- Sudha Belawadi
- Sudha Narasimharaju
- Sunil
- Sriimurali
- Srinath
- Sudha Rani
- Sudheer
- Suman Nagarkar
- Suman Ranganathan
- Sundar Krishna Urs
- Sundar Raj
- Suniel Shetty
- Sunil Kumar Desai
- Sudeepa
- Syed Aman Bachchan
- T. S. Nagabharana
- Tara
- Tiger Prabhakar
- Umashree
- Upendra
- Vajramuni
- Vaishali Desai
- Vasundhara Das
- Vanishree
- Vijay Kashi
- Vinayak Joshi
- Vishnuvardhan
- Yashwant Sardeshpande

=== Theatre ===
- Arundathi Nag
- Bhargavi Narayan
- B. V. Karanth
- Chandrashekhara Kambara
- Chindodi Leela
- Girish Karnad
- Gubbi Veeranna
- K. V. Subbanna
- Kalpana
- Lakshmi Chandrashekar
- Lokesh
- Master Hirannaiah
- Mukhyamantri Chandru
- Prasanna
- Shankar Nag
- Shivananda
- Umashree
- Vajramuni
- Yashwant Sardeshpande

=== Ancient architecture and sculpture ===
- Gundan Anivaritachari
- Jakanachari
- Ruvari Malithamma

=== Modern and contemporary art, art criticism ===
- Dattatreya Aralikatte
- Ashwini Bhat
- Surekha
- S. G. Vasudev
- Yusuf Arakkal

=== Music ===
==== Classical music - Carnatic ====
- Anoor Anantha Krishna Sharma
- B. Shankar Rao
- Chowdiah
- Doreswamy Iyengar
- Giridhar Udupa
- Gopala Dasa
- Jagannatha Dasa
- Jayachamarajendra Wadiyar
- Jyotsna Srikanth
- K. V. Krishna Prasad
- Kadri Gopalnath
- Kanaka Dasa
- M. S. Sheela
- Harikesanallur Muthayya Bhagavathar
- Mysore Nagaraj
- Dr.Mysore Manjunath
- Mysore Sadashiva Rao
- Mysore Vasudevachar
- N. Ravikiran
- Purandara Dasa
- R. K. Srikantan
- R. R. Keshavamurthy
- Sripadaraja
- Mysore V. Ramarathnam
- Vadiraja Tirtha
- Veene Sheshanna
- Vidyabhushana
- Vijaya Dasa
- Vittal Ramamurthy
- Vyasatirtha

==== Classical music - Hindustani ====
- Bapu Padmanabha, bansuri
- Basavaraj Rajguru, vocal
- Bhimsen Joshi, vocal
- Ganapati Bhat, vocal
- Gangubai Hangal, vocal
- Gururao Deshpande, vocal
- Jayateerth Mevundi, vocal
- Keshav Ginde, flute
- Kumar Gandharva, vocal
- Lalith J. Rao, vocal
- Madhav Gudi, vocal
- Madhav Gudi, vocal
- Mallikarjun Mansur, vocal
- Milind Chittal, vocal
- Nachiketa Sharma, vocal
- Nagaraja Rao Havaldar, vocal
- Panchakshara Gawai, vocal
- Pravin Godkhindi, bansuri
- Puttaraj Gawai, vocal
- Rajeev Taranath, sarod
- S. Ballesh, vocal and shehnai
- Sangeetha Katti, vocal
- Sanjeev Chimmalgi, vocal
- Sawai Gandharva, vocal
- Shobha Gurtu, vocal
- Smita Bellur, vocal
- Taranath Ram Rao Hattiangadi, tabla
- Venkatesh Kumar, vocal
- Vinayak Torvi, vocal

==== Modern musicians ====
- Balappa Hukkeri, folklore
- Bapu Padmanabha, flute
- Biddu, composer
- C. Ashwath, Sugama Sangeetha
- G. V. Atri, bhavageete
- Ganesh Hegde, choreography
- Mysore Ananthaswamy, bhavageete
- Mysore Manjunath
- P. Kalinga Rao, bhavageete
- Pandit Narasimhalu Vadavati
- Pravin Godkhindi, flute
- S. Ballesh, playback singer, music director, shehnai
- Shimoga Subbanna, Sugama Sangeetha

==== Film music ====
- Arjun Janya
- B. V. Karanth
- Bapu Padmanabha
- C. Ashwath
- Dharma Vish
- G. K. Venkatesh
- G. V. Iyer, settler
- Gurukiran
- Hamsalekha
- J. Anoop Seelin
- Jayanth Kaikini
- Mano Murthy
- Raghu Dixit
- Rajan–Nagendra
- Ravichandran
- Sadhu Kokila
- Sandeep Chowta
- Shankar–Ganesh
- V. Harikrishna
- V. Manohar
- Vijaya Bhaskar

==== Film singers ====
- Chetan Sosca
- Nanditha
- Rajkumar
- Rajesh Krishnan
- Vijay Prakash

=== Dance ===
- Maya Rao (1928-2014), Kathak Guru and founder of NIKC, Bangalore

=== Fashion ===
- Deepika Padukone
- Prasad Bidapa

== Kings and nobles ==
- Abbakka Chowta
- Amoghavarsha I
- Basava
- Bijjala II
- Bukka Raya I
- Butuga II
- Chand Bibi
- Chavundaraya
- Chikka Devaraja
- Deva Raya I
- Deva Raya II
- Dhruva Dharavarsha
- Durvinita
- Govinda III
- Harihara I
- Hyder Ali
- Ibrahim Adil Shah II
- Indra III
- Jayachamarajendra Wadiyar
- Rani Chennamma of Keladi
- Kempe Gowda I
- Kittur Chennamma of Kittur
- Krishna III
- Krishna Raja Wadiyar IV
- Krishnadevaraya
- Madakari Nayaka V
- Mayuravarma
- Pulakeshin II
- Rama Raya
- Saluva Narasimha Deva Raya
- Sangolli Rayanna, army chief of the Kingdom of Kittur
- Tailapa II
- Tipu Sultan
- Veera Ballala II
- Veera Ballala III
- Vikramaditya II
- Vikramaditya VI
- Vishnuvardhana

== Industrialists and businesspeople ==
- A. B. Shetty, founder of Vijaya Bank
- Ammembal Subba Rao Pai, founder of Canara Bank
- Ashok Kheny, NICE
- B. R. Shetty, NMC Group
- G. R. Gopinath, founder of Deccan Aviation
- Gururaj Deshpande, venture capitalist
- K. V. Kamath, managing director and CEO of ICICI Bank
- Kiran Mazumdar-Shaw, Biocon India Ltd.
- N. R. Narayana Murthy, Infosys Technologies, Ltd.
- N. S. Narendra, founder of FirePro
- Nandan Nilekani, Infosys Technologies, Ltd.
- Phaneesh Murthy, iGATE Global Solutions, Ltd.
- Pradeep Kar, Microland
- R. N. Shetty, Murdeshwar Group
- T. M. A. Pai, co-founder of Syndicate Bank and Manipal Academy of Higher Education
- V. G. Siddhartha, Cafe Coffee Day
- Vaman Srinivas Kudva, co-founder of Syndicate Bank
- Vijay Mallya, UB Group
- Vijay Sankeshwar, Vijayanand Group
- Vittal Mallya, UB Group

== Health care ==
- Dr. C. N. Manjunath, cardiologist
- Dr. Devi Shetty, cardiovascular surgeon
- Dr. H. Sudarshan Ballal
- Dr. Murugappa Channaveerappa Modi, eye surgeon
- Dr. Y. G. Parameshwara

== Science and technology ==
Science

- Agnikumar G. Vedeshwar
- B. N. Suresh
- C. N. R. Rao, chemistry
- C. R. Rao, statistics
- Gururaj Deshpande
- K. N. Shankara
- M.L. Kulkarni, pediatrician
- M. C. Modi, ophthalmology
- N. K. Naik, Professor Emeritus at IIT Bombay
- Nandan Nilekani
- Narayan Sadashiv Hosmane, biochemistry, cancer research
- Raja Ramanna, physics
- Roddam Narasimha, aerospace, atmospheric sciences
- S. G. Balekundri
- S. K. Shivakumar
- Sudha Murty
- Udupi Ramachandra Rao , space science
- Vivek Kulkarni

Mathematics

- D. C. Pavate
- Mahaviracharya
- Shakuntala Devi

Technology

- Arun Netravali, Bell Lab
- Kumar Malavalli, co-founder of Brocade Communication Systems
- M. Visvesvaraya
- Sachidananda Kangovi

Engineering

- Rajeshwari Chatterjee, Karnataka's first female engineer
- S. S. Murthy, Electrical engineer,

Economics

- N. S. Subba Rao

== Literature ==
=== Classical writers ===
- Adikavi Pampa
- Akka Mahadevi
- Amoghavarsha
- Andayya, 13th-century writer
- Asaga
- Basava
- Gangadevi, 14th-century poet and author
- Harihara, poet
- Janna
- Kanaka Dasa
- Kumara Vyasa
- Kumudendu Muni, author of Siribhoovalaya
- Lakshmisa (Jaimeni Bharatha in Kannada)
- Muddana, 19th-century poet and author
- Narayana Panditacharya
- Ponna
- Purandara Dasa
- Raghavanka
- Ranna, 10th-century poet
- Rudrabhatta
- Sarvajna
- Shishunala Sharif, first Muslim poet in Kannada literature
- Sivakotiacharya
- Tirumalamba
- Trivikrama Panditacharya

=== Modern writers ===
- A. K. Ramanujan
- A. N. Krishna Rao
- Anupama Niranjana
- Aravind Adiga, won the Man Booker Prize in 2008
- B. G. L. Swamy
- B. M. Srikantaiah
- Beechi, comedian from Bellary District
- Chandrashekhara Kambara
- D. R. Bendre
- D. V. Gundappa
- Dinakara Desai
- Ferdinand Kittel
- G. P. Rajarathnam
- Venkatesh Galaganath
- Girish Karnad
- Gopalakrishna Adiga
- Gorur Ramaswamy Iyengar
- H. M. Nayak
- H. S. Krishnaswamy Iyengar
- Javaregowda
- Jayalakshmi Seethapura
- K. Anantharamu
- K. S. Narasimhaswamy
- K. S. Nissar Ahmed
- Karanth
- Kuvempu
- M. Govinda Pai
- Maa Naa Chowdappa
- Masti Venkatesha Iyengar
- Maya Kamath, political cartoonist
- P. Lankesh
- P. T. Narasimhachar
- Panchakshari Hiremath
- Poornachandra Tejaswi
- R. C. Hiremath
- R. K. Narayan, settler
- Raja Rao
- S. L. Bhyrappa
- S. Srikanta Sastri
- Shashi Deshpande
- Shatavadhani Dr. R. Ganesh
- Shivaram Karanth
- T. N. Srikantaiah
- T. P. Kailasam
- T. R. Subba Rao
- U. R. Ananthamurthy
- Vinayaka Krishna Gokak
- Yashwant Vithoba Chittal

== Politicians ==
- Adagur H. Vishwanath, former Minister, former M.P
- Ananth Kumar, Union Minister for chemicals and fertilizers & M.P.
- B. D. Jatti, former vice-president
- B. S. Yediyurappa, former chief minister, MP
- Bantwal Vaikunta Baliga, former law minister; former speaker, Mysore State
- Bhagwanth Khuba, Member of Parliament, Bidar
- C. K. Jaffer Sharief, former Union Minister
- D. Devaraj Urs, former chief minister
- Dharam Singh, former chief minister
- George Fernandes, former defense minister
- Gudleppa Hallikeri, freedom fighter, former chairman of the Legislative Council.
- H. D. Deve Gowda, former prime minister
- H. D. Kumaraswamy, former chief minister
- J. H. Patel, former chief minister
- Jagadish Shettar, former chief minister
- K. Chengalaraya Reddy, former chief minister
- K. H. Muniyappa, former Union minister of state for Railways
- Kadidal Manjappa, former chief minister
- Kamaladevi Chattopadhyay, freedom fighter
- Kengal Hanumanthaiah, former chief minister
- Khedinji Kanthappa Hegde, former Karnataka Minister of Health
- L. G. Havanur, former law minister
- M. N. Jois, freedom fighter, former M.L.C, Dy Speaker of Legislative Council
- M. P. Prakash, former deputy chief minister
- Mallikarjun Kharge, former home minister, former Union Railway Minister
- Margaret Alva, former Union Minister
- Neeraj Patil, Mayor of Lambeth district of London
- Oscar Fernandes, former Union Minister
- Prabhakar Kore, member of Rajya Sabha from Karnataka
- R. Gundu Rao, former chief minister
- Ramakrishna Hegde, former chief minister
- Ramesh Jigajinagi, former home minister, currently Union Minister of state for drinking water and sanitation and M.P
- S. M. Krishna, Governor of Maharashtra, former chief minister
- S. Nijalingappa, former chief minister
- S. R. Bommai, former chief minister
- S. R. Kanthi, former chief minister
- Sadananda Gowda, former chief minister and present union Statistics and Program implementation minister
- Sarekoppa Bangarappa, former chief minister
- Shantaveri Gopala Gowda, Socialist leader, former MLA
- Shri Thanedar, United States Representative
- Siddaramaiah, former chief minister
- Sudheendra Kulkarni
- U. Srinivas Mallya, former member of parliament
- V. S. Acharya, former Minister for Home affairs & Medical Education
- Vatal Nagaraj, former MLA
- Veerappa Moily, former chief minister
- Veerendra Patil, former chief minister
- Vishweshwar Hegde Kageri , former Education Minister

== Bureaucrats ==
- Abdul Rahman Infant, IPS, DG & IGP, Karnataka
- C. B. Muthamma, first woman IFS officer
- C. G. Somiah, Comptroller and Auditor General of India (1990-1996)
- Daya Nayak
- H. T. Sangliana, former police officer, and M.P. Lok Sabha
- Kempaiah
- M. H. Marigowda, former director of Horticulture
- Shankar Bidari, IPS, DG & IPG, Karnataka
- Veeranna Aivalli
- Vivek Kulkarni

== Cooperative movement ==
- S. K. Amin, founder of South Kanara District Co-Operative Fish Marketing Federation

== Religion and philosophy ==
- Akka Mahadevi
- Allama Prabhu
- Balagangadharanatha Swamiji
- Basava, founder of Veerashaivism, social reformer
- Dattatreya
- Gangadharendra Saraswati
- Jayatirtha
- Kaadsiddheshwar
- Kanaka Dasa, saint
- Keshavashram
- Madhvacharya
- Mangesh V. Nadkarni
- Narahari Tirtha
- Narayan Maharaj
- Narayanacharya Vaishvanathi
- Padmanabha Tirtha
- Purandara Dasa, saint
- Raghavendra Tirtha
- Raghaveshwara Bharati
- Raghunatha Tirtha
- Raghuttama Tirtha
- Raghuvarya Tirtha
- Sadhguru , founder of Isha Foundation
- Sarvajna
- Satyabodha Tirtha
- Satyadharma Tirtha
- Satyanatha Tirtha
- Satyanidhi Tirtha
- Satyapramoda Tirtha
- Satyapriya Tirtha
- Satyasandha Tirtha
- Satyavrata Tirtha
- Shishunala Sharif
- Shivakumara Swami, Karnataka Ratna, highest civilian awarded by the state
- Shivamurthy Shivacharya Mahaswamiji
- Siddharudha Swami
- Sripadaraja
- Vadiraja Tirtha
- Vidyaranya, 12th Shankaracharya of Sringeri, spiritual guide to Vijayanagar Empire
- Vyasatirtha

== Yoga ==
- B. K. S. Iyengar
- Geeta Iyengar
- K. Pattabhi Jois
- Malladihalli Raghavendra
- Sadhguru
- Tirumalai Krishnamacharya, known as "the father of modern yoga" and reviver of Hatha yoga

== Wildlife and environment ==
- Hanumappa Sudarshan
- K. Ullas Karanth, tiger conservation
- Krupakar-Senani
- Vandana Shiva

== Historians, epigraphists and archaeologists ==
- A. N. Narasimhia
- B. A. Saletore
- B. Lewis Rice
- G. S. Gai
- P. B. Desai
- P. Gururaja Bhat
- S. Srikanta Sastri
- Shikaripura Ranganatha Rao

== Social service ==
- Malladihalli Raghavendra
- S. K. Amin
- Saalumarada Thimmakka
- Shivakumara Swami
- Sudha Murty
- Tulsi Gowda
- Veerendra Heggade

== Sports ==
=== Cricket ===
- Vijay Bhardwaj
- Raghuram Bhat
- Roger Binny
- Stuart Binny
- Bhagwat Chandrasekhar
- Deepak Chougule
- Rahul Dravid
- Doddanarasaiah Ganesh
- David Johnson
- Sunil Joshi
- Syed Kirmani
- Vinay Kumar
- Anil Kumble
- Sanjay Manjrekar
- Abhimanyu Mithun
- Manju Nadgoda
- Manish Pandey
- Brijesh Patel
- Venkatesh Prasad
- E.A.S. Prasanna
- KL Rahul
- A. Ramakrishnappa
- Shantha Rangaswamy
- Barrington Rowland
- Ganesh Satish
- Sujith Somasunder
- Javagal Srinath
- Robin Uthappa
- Gundappa Vishwanath
- Sadanand Viswanath

=== Hockey ===
- B. P. Govinda (former captain, Arjun award)
- M. P. Ganesh (former captain, Arjun Award)
- Ashish Ballal
- Arjun Halappa
- M M Somaiya (former captain)

=== Football ===
- Vinoth Kumar
- Xavier Vijay Kumar
- N.S. Manju
- Kuppuswami Sampath
- Shankar Sampingiraj
- Karma Tsewang
- Sanjeeva Uchil (Represented India in 1948 Olympics)

=== Athletics ===
- Ashwini Nachappa
- J. J. Shobha
- Vandana Rao
- Vandana Shanbagh
- Vikas Gowda
- Girisha Nagarajegowda Para-athletics

=== Badminton ===
- Prakash Padukone
- Anup Sridhar
- Ashwini Ponnappa

=== Tennis ===
- Rohan Bopanna
- Poojashree Venkatesh
- Srinath Prahlad

=== Others ===
- C.C. Machaiah, former boxer, Olympian and coach, 1978 Arjuna Awardee
- Chetan Baboor, Table Tennis
- Nisha Millet, Swimming
- Pankaj Advani, Billiards
- Malathi Krishnamurthy Holla

== Military ==
- Ajjamada B Devaiah, Pilot in Indian air force, Maha Vir Chakra (posthumous), war martyr.
- Field Marshal K.M. Cariappa, Commander-in-Chief, Indian Armed Forces
- Gen.K. S. Thimayya, Chief of Staff, Indian Army
- Gen. A C Iyappa, Prisoner-of-War in World War II, Indian Army, BEL chief.
- Air Marshal C D Subbaiah, VrC, PVSM, World War II fighter pilot, Indian Army.
- Ramesh Halagali, AVSM, SM, Deputy Chief of Indian Army.
- Major M C Muthanna, killed by terrorists in Jammu and Kashmir, Shaurya Chakra awardee.
- Major Sandeep Unnikrishnan, killed in action during the November 2008 Mumbai attacks, consequently awarded the Ashoka Chakra, Indian Army

== Judiciary ==
- Justice Manepalli Narayana Rao Venkatachaliah, retired Chief Justice of the Supreme Court
- Justice N Y Hanumanthappa, Chief Justice of Orissa High Court and Ex-Member of Parliament, Chitra Durga
- Justice Santhosh Hegde, retired Supreme Court Judge
- Justice H.L.Dattu, retired Chief Justice of the Supreme Court
- Justice V. Gopala Gowda, Supreme Court Judge
- Chief Justice of India P. B. Gajendragadkar, from Gajendragad

== Award winners ==
=== Bharat Ratna ===
- Sir M. Visvesvaraya, 1955
- Bhimsen Joshi, 2008
- C.N.R. Rao, 2014

=== Jnanpith Award ===
- Kuvempu, for his epic Sri Ramayana Darshanam, in 1969
- D. R. Bendre, for his anthology of poems Naku Thanthi, in 1974
- K. Shivaram Karanth, for his novel Mookajjiya Kanasugalu, in 1977
- Masti Venkatesha Iyengar, for his historical novel Chikkaveera Rajendra, in 1983
- V. K. Gokak, for Bharatha Sindhu Rashmi, in 1990
- U. R. Ananthamurthy, for his monumental contributions, in 1994
- Girish Karnad, for his monumental contributions to Kannada literature and for contributions to Kannada theatre (Yayati), in 1998
- Chandrashekhara Kambara, for his monumental contributions to Kannada literature, in 2010

=== Saraswati Samman ===
- S. L. Bhyrappa, for his novel Mandra, in 2010

== Militants ==
- Iqbal Bhatkal
- Kafeel Ahmed, 2007 London car bombing
- Riyaz Bhatkal
- Yasin Bhatkal

== Others ==
- Shakuntala Devi, calculating prodigy; "called human computer"
- N. Someswara, doctor and quiz master of Thatt Antha Heli
- Aluru Venkata Rao
- Huilgol Narayana Rao
- Ravi Belagere
- Mayurasharma
- Pulakesi I
- Krishna Deva Raya
- Kudroli Ganesh, magician
- Kumara Rama
- Mala Honnatti, mountain climber.
- Somesvara I
- Belawadi Mallamma
- Kittur Chennamma
- Attimabbe
- Raghavendra Acharya
- Pandita Ramabai, reformer for women's education, Sanskrit scholar, Christian Bible translator into Marathi
- Saraswati Gangadhar
- S. D. Phadnis, cartoonist
- A. N. Prahlada Rao, crossword writer; created 40,000 crosswords; name mentioned in LIMCA Book of Records 2015

== See also ==
- List of Kannada poets
- List of people from Bengaluru
- Kannadigas
- Tuluva
- Kodava people
- Konkani people
- Lists of Indians by state
- List of Lingayats
