= FirePro =

FirePro may refer to:

- FirePro Systems, a fire engineering company based in Europe; see Automatic fire suppression
- Firepro Systems (India)
- AMD FirePro, a graphics card from US-based Advanced Micro Devices
- Firepro Systems Private Limited (India), a security and building management systems provider
- Fire Pro Wrestling, a wrestling video game series from Japan
