= Allama (film) =

- Directed by: T. S. Nagabharana
- Screenplay by: T. S. Nagabharana
- Story by: T. S. Nagabharana
- Produced by: Srihari L. Khode
- Starring: Dhananjaya; Meghana Raj
- Cinematography: G. S. Bhaskar
- Music by: Bapu Padmanabha
- Production company: Yajaman Enterprises
- Distributed by: Mars Distributors
- Release date: 26 January 2017
- Running time: 139 minutes
- Country: India
- Language: Kannada

Allama is a 2017 Indian Kannada musical drama Historical film directed by T. S. Nagabharana. The film stars Dhananjaya and Meghana Raj in the lead roles. Principal photography of the film started in late 2015. It was released theatrically on 26 January 2017.

The film was nominated as India's entry for the International Council for Film, Television and Audio-visual Communication (ICFT) UNESCO Gandhi Medal. At the 64th National Film Awards, it won awards for Best Music Direction for Songs and Best Background Score (Bapu Padmanabha) and Best Make-up Artist (N. K. Ramakrishna).

== Plot ==
The film captures the story of the rebellious thinker Allama, also known as Allama Prabhu. It narrates the tale of the 12th-century metaphysician, a son of a temple dancer, who embarks on a quest for knowledge and answers to his four core sentiments, yearning, and obsession – Maddales, failures, and self-realization.

== Cast ==
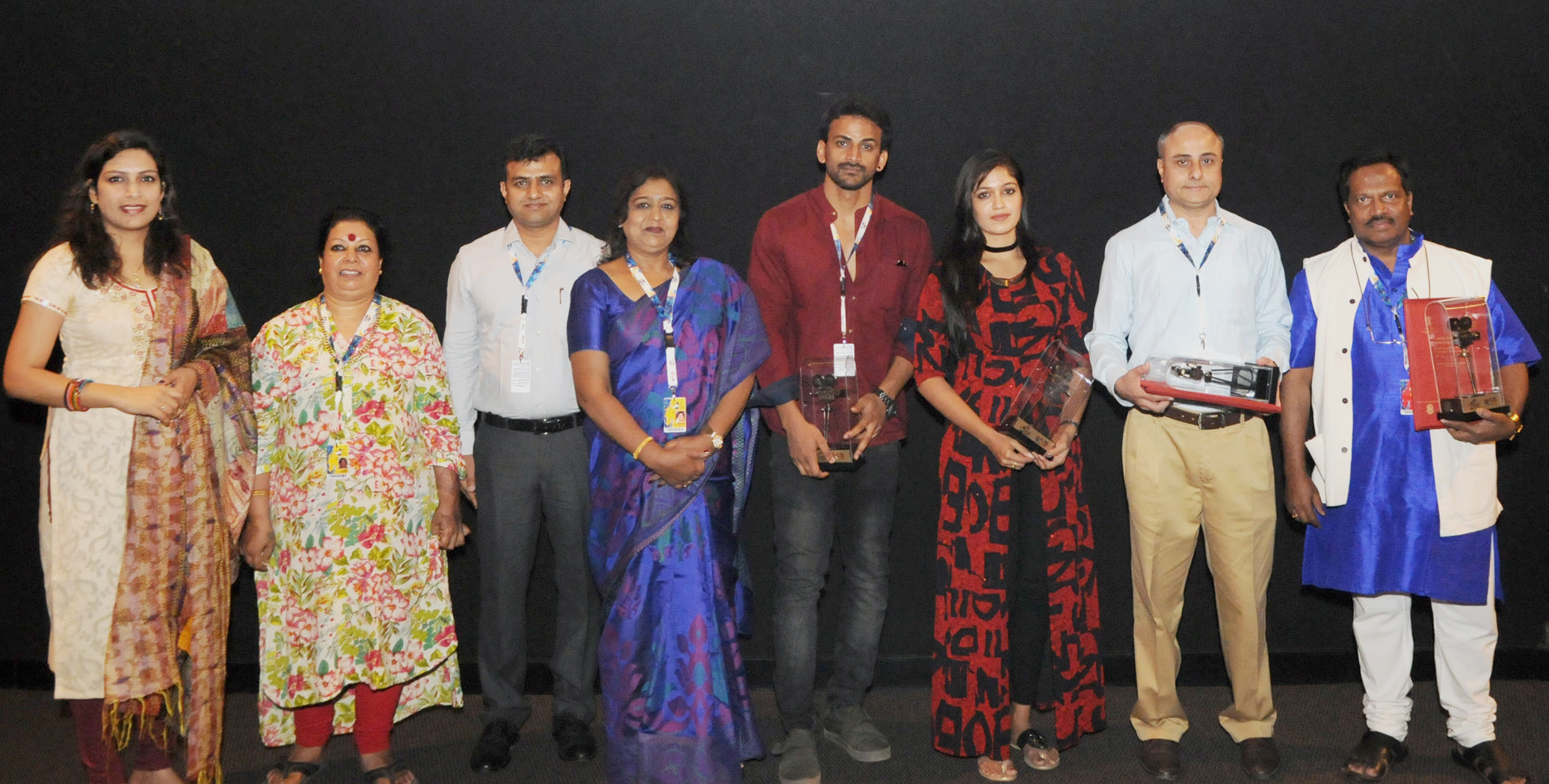
Director Nagabhararana (extreme right) with the cast and crew at the presentation of Allama, during the 47th International Film Festival of India, 2016

- Dhananjaya as Allama Prabhu
- Meghana Raj as Maya Devi, a temple dancer
- Taushir
- Lakshmi Gopalaswamy as Allama's mother
- Sanchari Vijay as Basavanna
- Ramakrishna
- Prasanna Shetty as Bahuroopi Shivayya
- Mico Manju as Siddarama
- Bajarangi Chetan as Shambhunatha
- Ashalatha
- Shrutha Bharana as Akkamahadevi

== Soundtrack ==
Allama
- Soundtrack cover

Soundtrack album by Bapu Padmanabha
- Released: 31 March 2016
- Genre: Feature film soundtrack
- Length: 41:12
- Language: Kannada
- Label: Aantardhwani

Bapu Padmanabha scored the film's background and soundtrack. The soundtrack album consists of 18 tracks. It includes 14 vachanas; 11 of Allama Prabhu, and 1 each of Basava, Akka Mahadevi and Siddheshwar. The album was released on 31 March 2016 in Bangalore.

Track listing
No.	Title	Lyrics	Artist(s)	Length
1.	"Honnu Maaye Embaru"	Allama Prabhu	Hemanth	2:05
2.	"Ayya Nimma"	Basava	Ganesh Desai	1:30
3.	"Banavasi Kaada Tumba"	Doddarange Gowda	Rajesh Krishnan	3:46
4.	"Sri Guruve Enage"	Traditional	Rajesh Krishnan	2:02
5.	"Pranathiyu Ide Batthiyu Ide"	Allama Prabhu	Hemanth	3:07
6.	"Sambandha Asambandha"	Allama Prabhu	Hemanth	1:28
7.	"Temple Dance"	Traditional	Tejaswini M. K.	3:51
8.	"Nelada Bombeya Maadi"	Allama Prabhu	Bapu Padmanabha	1:35
9.	"Maya Shringara"	B. R. Lakshmana Rao	Manjula Gururaj	3:17
10.	"Kaana Baarada Lingavu"	Allama Prabhu	Rajesh Krishnan	1:29
11.	"Kaalugaleradu Gaali Kandayya"	Allama Prabhu	Shankar Mahadevan	2:09
12.	"Agniya Suduvalli"	Allama Prabhu	Shankar Mahadevan	2:17
13.	"Ettana Maamara Ettana Kogile"	Allama Prabhu	Shankar Mahadevan	2:10
14.	"Sutthi Sutthi Bandhadilla"	Allama Prabhu	Shankar Mahadevan	1:36
15.	"Sangana Basavannana Paadava"	Akka Mahadevi	Sangeetha Katti	2:53
16.	"Vachanaanubhava"	Siddheshwar	Ganesh Desai	1:04
17.	"Kendadha Giriya Melondu"	Allama Prabhu	Bapu Padmanabha	1:28
18.	"Bayalu Bayalane Bitthi"	Allama Prabhu	Rajesh Krishnan	3:25
Total length:				41:12

== Reception ==
The Kannada movie Allama, which hit screens in 2017, got a proper mixed response from critics. Deccan Chronicle said it's like "Allama with a guidebook"—interesting but feels a bit too textbook-ish, not fully gripping. The Hindu was straight-up disappointed, calling it a "disappointing saga" that didn't live up to the hype around the philosopher's story. New Indian Express gave it a light pat, saying it's "Allama for beginners"—good for newbies but too simple for those who know the real deal. Meanwhile, Deccan Herald was all praises, calling it an "engaging portrait" of the philosopher that keeps you hooked. The Times of India had a middle-ground take, saying it's decent with some strong moments but doesn't fully hit the mark. Vijaya Karnataka liked the effort, saying it's a solid try to show Allama's life, even if not perfect. Prajavani also gave it a nod, appreciating the deep vibes and how it brings out the thinker's journey.

== Controversy ==
The film landed in controversy prior to its release in January 2016, after groups, such as Rashtriya Basavadal and Basava Peetha, staged demonstrations in Dharwad calling for its ban. They alleged that the film wrongly depicts the ritual of wearing miniaturized iconographic form of the deity Shiva, the Jyotirlinga. They claimed that, instead, Ishtalinga should have been depicted. The film shows the worship of Lingam performed placing it on the devotee's right hand, when they claimed that history states that it was done by keeping it in the left hand. The protesters also said that Allama Prabhu and Akka Mahadevi are depicted in the film without wearing the lingam. They claimed that "all these scenes prove that it is a systematic approach to fabricate vachana sahitya", in a memorandum submitted to the Chief Minister of Karnataka calling for the film's ban.

== Awards and nominations ==
64th National Film Awards

- Best Music Direction (Songs) — Bapu Padmanabha
- Best Music Direction (Best Background Score) — Bapu Padmanabha
- Best Make-up Artist — N. K. Ramakrishna

65th Filmfare Awards South

- Critics Best Actor – Kannada — Dhananjaya
