= Allama (disambiguation) =

Allama might stand for:

- Allama Prabhu, a mystic-saint and Vachana poet of the Kannada language in the 12th century
- Allama (film), an upcoming film
- Allamah, an honorary title carried by the highest scholars of Islamic thought
