= Shiralakoppa =

- Town
- Location in Karnataka, India
- Coordinates: 14.38°N 75.25°E
- Country: India
- State: Karnataka
- District: Shivamogga
- Elevation: 595 m (1,952 ft)

Population (2001)
  - Total: 14,501

Languages
  - Official: Kannada
- Time zone: UTC+5:30 (IST)
- Postal code: 577428

Shiralakoppa is a panchayat town in Shikaripur Taluk, Shivamogga district in the Indian state of Karnataka.

== Geography ==
Shiralakoppa is located at 14.38°N 75.25°E. It has an average elevation of 595 metres (1952 feet). Shiralakoppa is 70 km away from Shimoga and 20 km from Shikaripura.

== Demographics ==
As of 2001 India census, Shiralakoppa had a population of 14,501. Males constitute 50% of the population and females 50%. Shiralakoppa has an average literacy rate of 68%, higher than the national average of 59.5%: male literacy is 70%, and female literacy is 66%. In Shiralakoppa, 15% of the population is under 6 years of age.

== Places of interest ==
The historical Belligavi temple is located 2 km away from shiralakoppa. Uduthadi, birthplace of Akka Mahadevi, is located 4 km southerly to Siralakoppa.
