= Society of the Hoysala Kingdom =

The Hoysala Kingdom (Kannada: ಹೊಯ್ಸಳ ಸಾಮ್ರಾಜ್ಯ) was a South Indian Kannada dynasty that ruled most of the modern-day state of Karnataka between the 10th to the 14th centuries. The capital of the empire was initially based at Belur, and later transferred to Halebidu. Hoysala society in many ways reflected the emerging religious, political and cultural developments of those times.

== Society ==
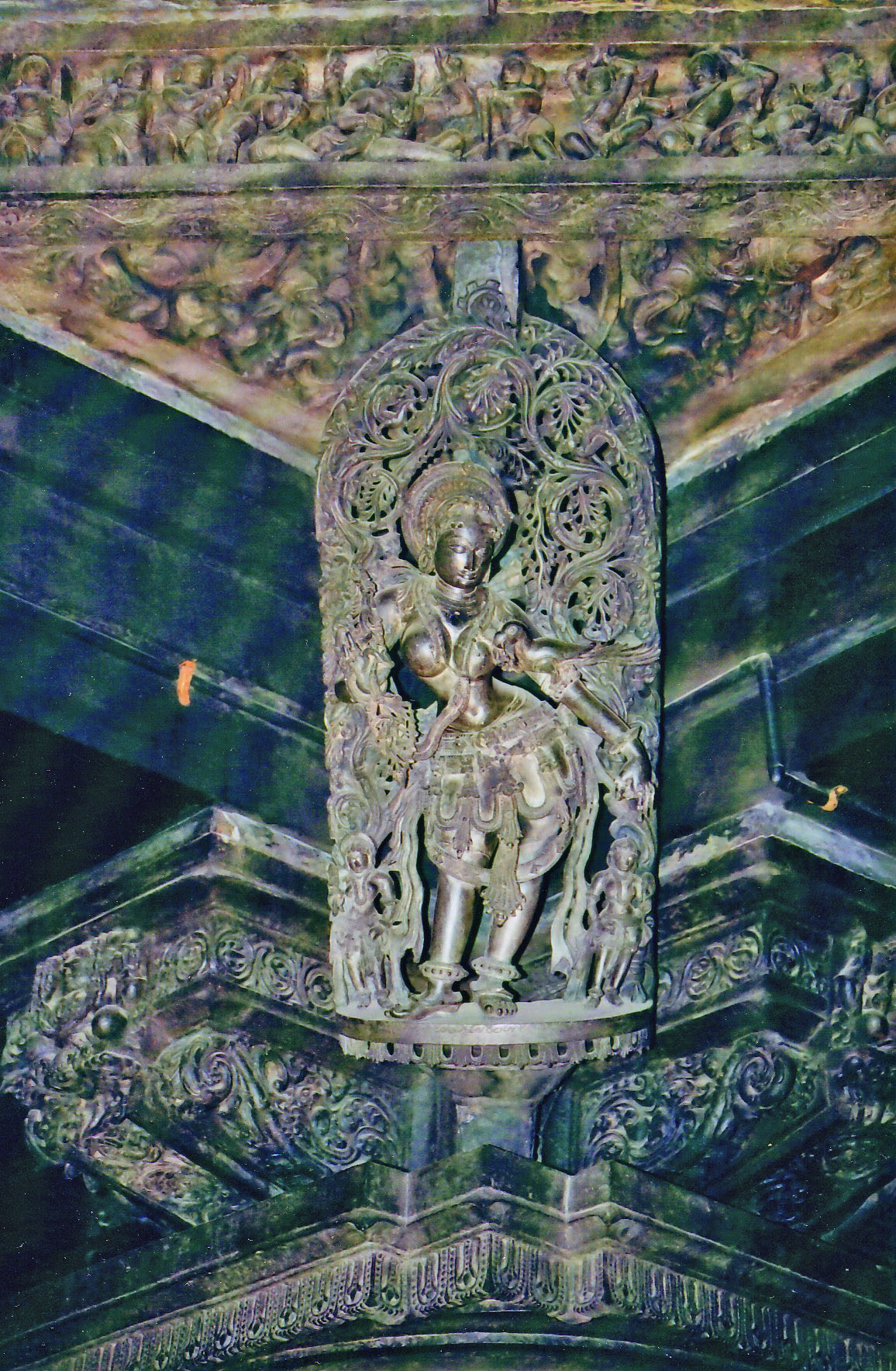
Lady with Parrot, Belur

A notable feature of the Hoysala kingdom was the involvement of women, especially of royalty, in administrative matters. Queen Umadevi governed Halebidu in the absence of Veera Ballala II and is known to have fought wars against antagonistic feudatories. Women participated in music, dance, literature, poetry, politics and administration. Queen Shantala Devi was well versed in dance and music and rendered public performances. Akka Mahadevi, a Vachana poet who renounced the temporal world in favour of one of devotion became an example for woman of the day. The practice of sati, though voluntary was prevalent and prostitution was socially acceptable. Temple dancers (Devadasi) were common in temples and some were well educated and accomplished in arts. These qualifications gave them more freedom than other urban and rural women who were restricted to daily mundane tasks. Like in most of India, the Indian caste system was conspicuously present.

Trade on the west coast brought many foreigners to India including Arabs, Jews, Persians, Chinese and people from the Malay Peninsula. Large scale migration of people from present day Karnataka to Tamil Nadu happened during this time. With the expansion of Hoysala territory in Tamil country, these immigrants went as officers and soldiers of the empire and were given land concessions. Migration of Tamil sculptors to Belur and Halebidu is also apparent from the presence of some Chola style sculptures in a few Hoysala temples. The marketplace was the nuclei of urban centres. This is where materials and produce was brought and exchanged hands. These were the location of recurring festivals and fairs. In South India, towns were called Pattana or Pattanam and the marketplace, Nagara or Nagaram. Important marketplaces gradually grew into townships and so did famous pilgrim places. Shravanabelagola in Hassan district developed from a place of religion in the 7th century to an important settlement by the 12th century when rich Jain merchants were established here. The market place was also closely tied with temple administration.

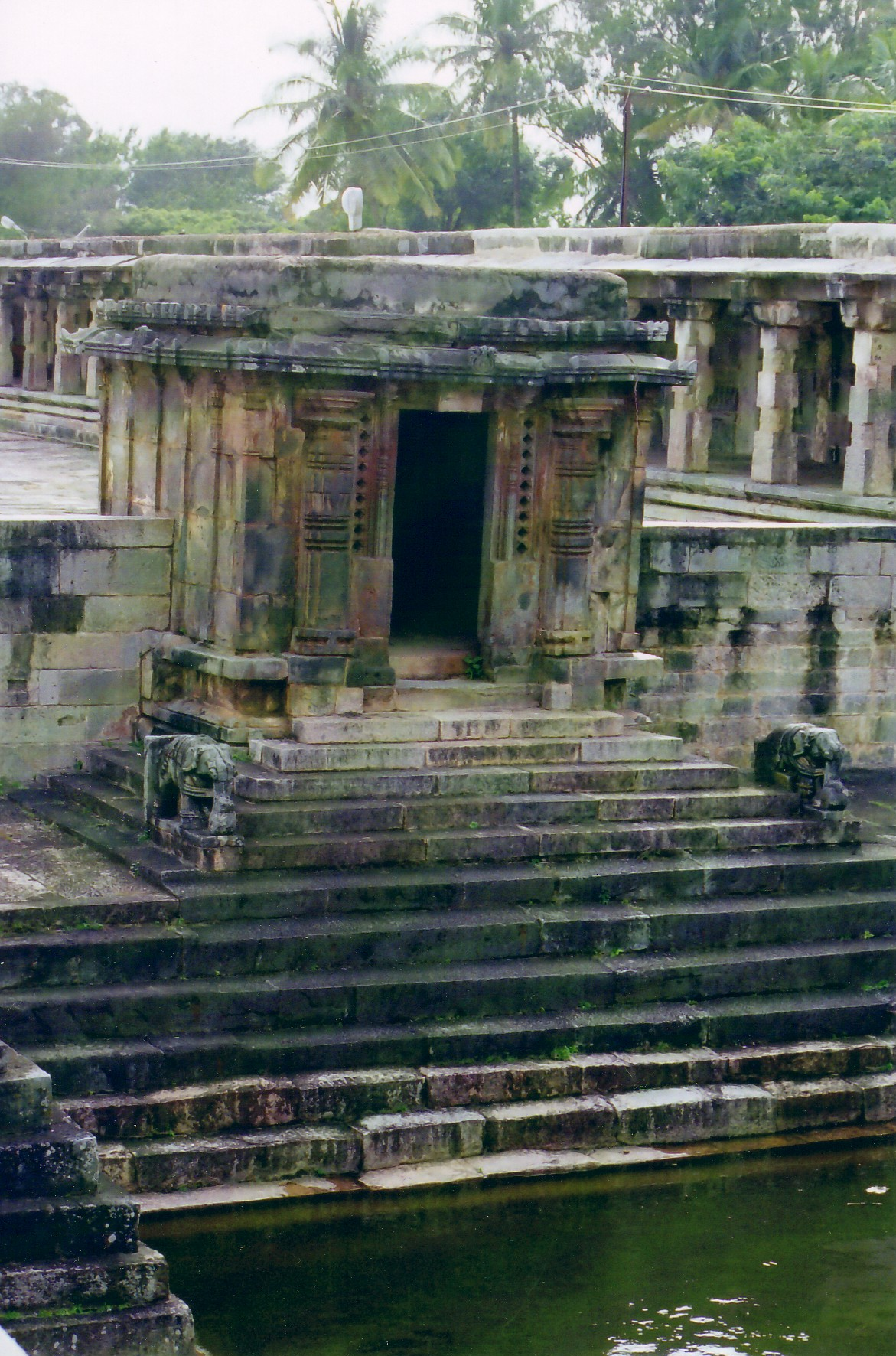
Temple tank in Belur

The prolific temple construction was not entirely for religious reasons. Temples acted as local courts or as surrogate courts, especially when built from royal endowments. They were seen as palaces and the rituals marking the daily routine of the deity imitated those of the king. Some temples also received local patronage from rich landlords. Temples built from royal patronage took on an aura of a leading ceremonial centre. When king Vishnuvardhana built the Chennakesava Temple ( a Vaishnava temple) at Belur, the town was transformed into a famous city. Competition from the Shaiva merchants of Halebidu resulted in the construction of the Hoysaleswara temple which gave the town prominence. Often temples built in rural areas were not supported by royal patronage. They evolved into complex institutions related to fiscal, political, cultural and religious needs. Irrespective of patronage, temples were also establishments that provided employment to hundreds of people. Temple funds maintained families of priests, record keepers, administrators, guards, garland makers, dancers, devadasis, sculptors, carpenters and craftsmen. They were also a source of loans. Inscriptions mention 12%–15% interest on loans. In short, Hindu temples began to take on the shape of wealthy Buddhist monasteries.
