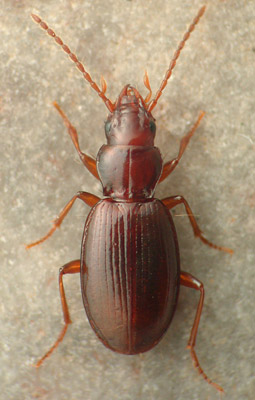
- Amerizus wingatei

Scientific classification
- Kingdom: Animalia
- Phylum: Arthropoda
- Class: Insecta
- Order: Coleoptera
- Suborder: Adephaga
- Family: Carabidae
- Subfamily: Trechinae
- Tribe: Bembidiini
- Subtribe: Bembidiina
- Genus: Amerizus; Chaudoir, 1868

Subgenera
- Amerizus Chaudoir, 1868; Tiruka Andrewes, 1935

= Amerizus =

Genus of beetles

Amerizus is a genus of ground beetles in the family Carabidae. There are more than 50 described species in Amerizus.

== Species ==
These 53 species belong to the genus Amerizus:

- Amerizus arunachalensis Deuve, 2006 (the Indian Subcontinent)
- Amerizus barkamensis Deuve, 1998 (China)
- Amerizus baxiensis Deuve, 1998 (China)
- Amerizus beatriciae Queinnec & Perreau, 2002 (the Indian Subcontinent)
- Amerizus bhutanensis (Morvan, 2004) (the Indian Subcontinent)
- Amerizus bolivari (Andrewes, 1927) (the Indian Subcontinent)
- Amerizus camillae Queinnec & Perreau, 2002 (the Indian Subcontinent)
- Amerizus casalei Perrault, 1985 (the Indian Subcontinent)
- Amerizus davidales Sciaky & Toledano, 2007 (China)
- Amerizus deuvei Perrault, 1985 (the Indian Subcontinent)
- Amerizus eremita (Queinnec, 1984) (the Indian Subcontinent)
- Amerizus faizae Queinnec & Perreau, 2002 (the Indian Subcontinent)
- Amerizus farkaci Sciaky & Toledano, 2007 (China)
- Amerizus ganesh (Queinnec, 1984) (the Indian Subcontinent)
- Amerizus gaoligongensis Gueorguiev, 2015 (China)
- Amerizus garuda Queinnec & Perreau, 2002 (the Indian Subcontinent)
- Amerizus gologensis Deuve, 2004 (China)
- Amerizus gongga Deuve, 1998 (China)
- Amerizus gosainkundensis (Habu, 1973) (the Indian Subcontinent)
- Amerizus hubeiensis Deuve, 2002 (China)
- Amerizus indecorus Queinnec & Perreau, 2002 (the Indian Subcontinent)
- Amerizus kashmiricus (Jedlicka, 1938) (the Indian Subcontinent)
- Amerizus lama Sciaky & Toledano, 2007 (China)
- Amerizus lassallei Perrault, 1985 (the Indian Subcontinent)
- Amerizus ledouxi Perrault, 1985 (the Indian Subcontinent)
- Amerizus loebli Marggi & Toledano, 2015 (the Indian Subcontinent)
- Amerizus macrocephalus Queinnec & Perreau, 2002 (the Indian Subcontinent)
- Amerizus maquensis Deuve, 2004 (China)
- Amerizus markamensis Deuve, 1998 (China)
- Amerizus martensi Queinnec & Perreau, 2002 (the Indian Subcontinent)
- Amerizus morvani Queinnec & Perreau, 2002 (the Indian Subcontinent)
- Amerizus mourzinei Deuve, 1998 (China)
- Amerizus oblonguloides (Lindroth, 1963) (North America)
- Amerizus oblongulus (Mannerheim, 1852) (North America)
- Amerizus panda Sciaky & Toledano, 2007 (China)
- Amerizus perraulti Deuve, 1998 (China)
- Amerizus puetzi Sciaky & Toledano, 2007 (China)
- Amerizus queinneci Deuve, 1998 (China)
- Amerizus sabinae Queinnec & Perreau, 2002 (the Indian Subcontinent)
- Amerizus sarkimani Queinnec & Perreau, 2002 (the Indian Subcontinent)
- Amerizus schawalleri Queinnec & Perreau, 2002 (the Indian Subcontinent)
- Amerizus schmidti Sciaky & Toledano, 2007 (China)
- Amerizus shatanicus Deuve, 2004 (China)
- Amerizus songpanensis Deuve, 1998 (China)
- Amerizus spectabilis (Mannerheim, 1852) (North America)
- Amerizus teles Belousov & Dudko, 2010 (Russia)
- Amerizus tiani Deuve, 2004 (China)
- Amerizus turnai Deuve, 1998 (China)
- Amerizus utahensis (Van Dyke, 1926) (North America)
- Amerizus wingatei (Bland, 1864) (Europe & Northern Asia (excluding China) and North America)
- Amerizus wittmeri Queinnec & Perreau, 2002 (the Indian Subcontinent)
- Amerizus wolongensis Deuve, 2002 (China)
- Amerizus wrzecionkoi Deuve, 1998 (China)
