= Ajithana Sahasagalu =

- Original title: ಅಜಿತನ ಸಾಹಸಗಳು
- Genre: Detective
- Starring: B. V. Rajaram as Ajith
- Country of origin: India
- Original language: Kannada

Original release
- Network: DD Chandana

Ajithana Sahasagalu was a Kannada language detective teleserial that aired on DD Kannada in the early 1990s. The serial was based on Arthur Conan Doyle detective stories.
