= Nachiketa (name) =

Nachiketa is an Indian masculine given name. It is most well-known through the character of the same name in the ancient Katha Upanishad.

Notable people with the name include:

- Kambampati Nachiketa (born 1973), Indian Air Force Pilot
- Nachiketa Ghosh (1925–1976), Indian music director and composer
- Nachiketa Sharma, musician
- Nachiketa Chakraborty, musician
