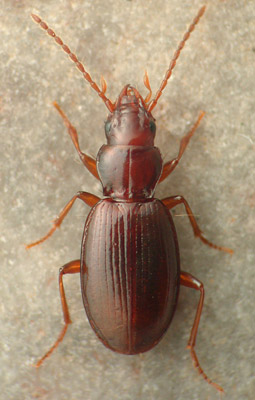

Conservation status
- Secure (NatureServe)

Scientific classification
- Kingdom: Animalia
- Phylum: Arthropoda
- Class: Insecta
- Order: Coleoptera
- Suborder: Adephaga
- Family: Carabidae
- Genus: Amerizus
- Species: A. wingatei

Binomial name
- Amerizus wingatei (Bland, 1864)

Synonyms
- Bembidion wingatei Bland, 1864

= Amerizus wingatei =

Species of beetle

Amerizus wingatei, also known as Wingate's riverbank ground beetle, is a species of ground beetle in the family Carabidae. It is found in the eastern North America. The Integrated Taxonomic Information System (ITIS) reports it also for Europe and northern Asia (excluding China), but this is not supported by Bousquet (2012) and Carabcat database (2021).
