= Kudroli Ganesh =

Indian magician

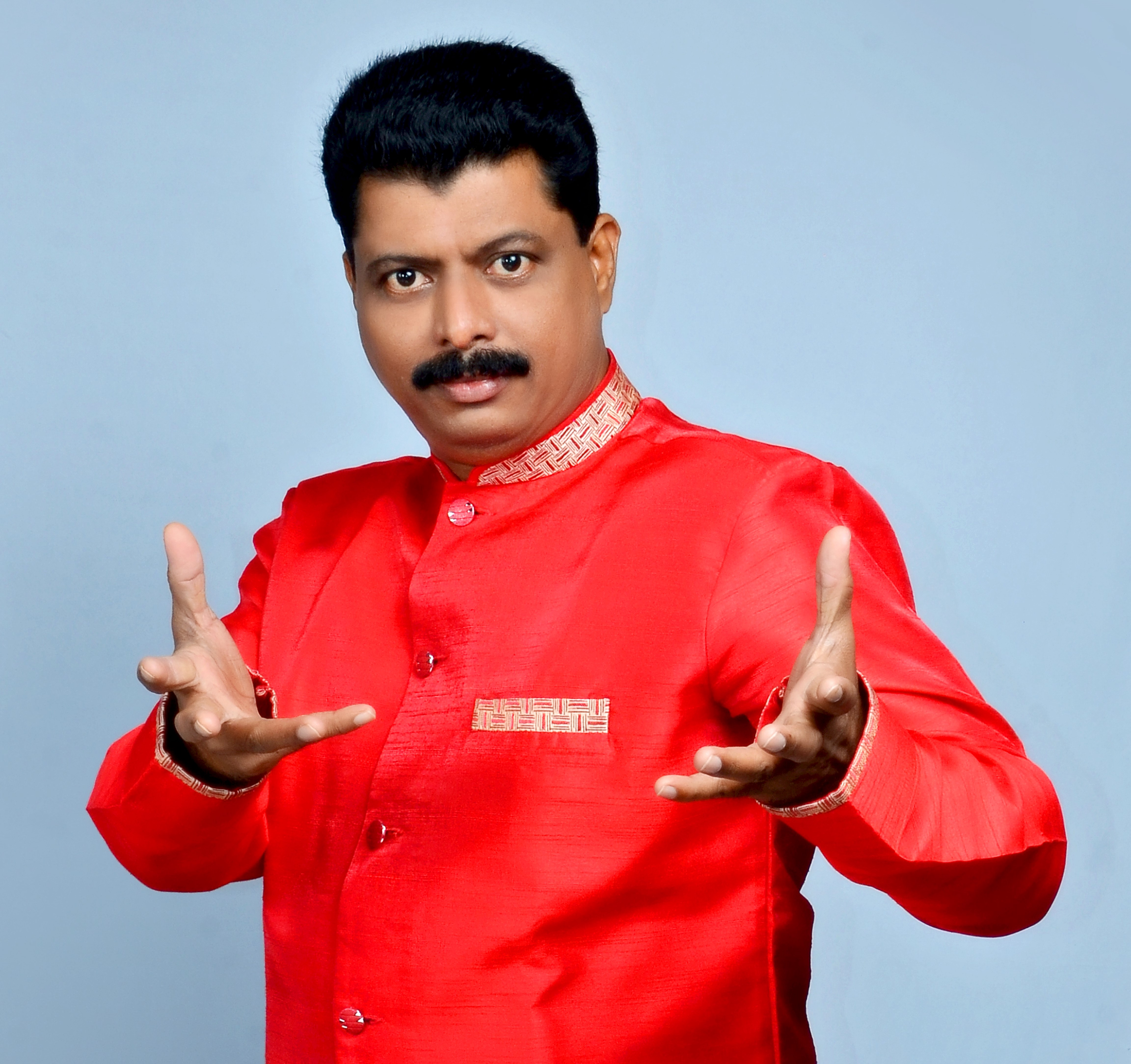
- Ganesh, in Colors Kannada program, Comedy Talkies
- Born: Kudroli, Mangalore, Karnataka, India
- Occupation: Magician
- Website: www.kudroliganesh.com

Kudroli Ganesh is an Indian magician.

== Career ==
As a magician, Kudroli Ganesh has won many national and international awards including the first ever Illusion Magic Award. He has held more than 2000 shows in the country including 245 shows in schools.

=== Series ===
- Vismaya (meaning: wonder), (completed 10 years as in October 2009)
- Maya Spatikada Chamatkara (meaning: Magical sphere's wonder)

== See also ==
- Indian magicians
- List of people from Karnataka
