= N. Someswara =

Indian television presenter and writer (born 1955)

- Born: Narappa Someswara; 14 May 1955 (age 71); Malleshwara, Bangalore, Mysore State (now Karnataka), India
- Other name: Someswara Narappa
- Education: Bangalore Medical College
- Occupations: Television presenter, writer
- Years active: 1984–present
- Spouse: Rukmavathy B. V.
- Children: 1

Narappa Someswara (born 14 May 1955) is an Indian quiz master, television presenter and writer. He is known for popularising science and medicine in the print and the electronic media in the Kannada language. He was also the editor of Jeevanaadi, a monthly medical magazine. He has also published 41 books on various aspects of medicine, 5 books are under different stages of publication and multiple articles on health and medicine in various journals. Someswara also hosts the game show Thatt Antha Heli which in 2012 entered the Limca Book of Records to become the longest running television quiz show.

== Personal life ==
Someswara was born to Narappa and mother was Anjana . He was born on 14 May 1955 in Malleshwaram locality of Bangalore, in the erstwhile Mysore State (now Karnataka). He received his bachelor's degree in medicine from Bangalore Medical College in 1986. He is married to Rukmavathy B. V. and they have a son together, Nachiketha.

== Career ==
=== As writer ===
Someswara is a well-known writer of medicine in Kannada and was instrumental in popularising science and medicine in the print and the electronic media. He is also the editor of Jeevanaadi, a monthly medical magazine. He has also published 30 books on various aspects of medicine and innumerable articles on health and medicine in various journals. He has also conducted more than 1,200 programmes on Doordarshan on science and health awareness, and 75 programmes on the same on All India Radio.

=== As television presenter ===
Someshwar is a presenter of Thatt Antha Heli, a quiz program broadcast by DD Chandana TV channel telecast from Doordarshan Kendra, Bangalore, Monday to Friday 09.30PM IST. This show has completed a record 4000+ episodes without any sponsorship. With three participants, this show consists of 10 questions in different fields like education, science and technology, culture, heritage etc. Each answer is awarded a valuable book published and printed by Kannada Sahitya Parishat, instead of cash prize, which is a speciality of this program.

== Awards ==
In 2004, Someswara was awarded the Dr. P. S. Shankar Shreshtha Vaidya Sahitya Prasashthi for 2003, for how work Elu Suttina Koteyalli Entu Koti Bhantaru (Eight crore warriors in a seven layered fort). The work dealt with diseases caused from immunodeficiency such as AIDS, and the mechanism involved in anaphylaxis and other auto immune disorders. Someswara is also a two-time winner of the Karnataka Sahitya Academy Award, both times in the category of scientific literature. The first award was for his book Badukaneeduva Badali Jodane in 2001, and second for 2015. In 2013, he was awarded the Best Science Writer Kannada for 2012–13 by the Karnataka Science and Technology Academy for his work Gnanendriyagalu Matthu Namma Odala Visarjanangagalu. Other awards won by him include the Dr. B. C. Roy Doctors day Award, Aryabhata International Award and the Samadana Janaseva Award.

== See also ==
- Quizzing in India
