= Amerizus spectabilis =

Conservation status
- Unranked (NatureServe)

Scientific classification
- Kingdom: Animalia
- Phylum: Arthropoda
- Clade: Pancrustacea
- Class: Insecta
- Order: Coleoptera
- Suborder: Adephaga
- Family: Carabidae
- Genus: Amerizus
- Species: A. spectabilis

Binomial name
- Amerizus spectabilis (Mannerheim, 1852)

Synonyms
- Trechus spectabilis Mannerheim, 1852; Bembidion spectabile (Mannerheim, 1852); Amerizus longicornis Casey, 1918

Species of beetle

Amerizus spectabilis, also known as spectacular riverbank ground beetle, is a species of ground beetle in the family Carabidae. It is found in North America along the Pacific coast from Alaska to California.
