= Udutadi =

Udutadi (or Udugani) is a small village located in Shikaripur taluk of Shimoga District in India. It is located about fifteen kilometers northwesterly to Shikaripura and five kilometers southerly to Siralkoppa. During the 12th century, it was the capital of King Kaushika. There is an old fort here.

Udutadi is the birthplace of Saint Akka Mahadevi, a 12th-century legendary poet who sang Lord Shiva's glory. Her verses in Kannada are known as Vachanas. A temple has been built in the memory of Akka Mahadevi.

Shimoga Town railway station is the nearest rail-head.
