= Shankar Bidari =

Indian police chief

- ಶಂಕರ್ ಬಿದರಿ

Director General and Inspector General of Karnataka Police
- In office July 1978 – May 2012

Personal details
- Born: Shankar Mahadev Bidari; 27 August 1954 (age 71) Galagali, Bagalkot district, Karnataka, India
- Spouse: Dr. Umadevi
- Children: 2
- Occupation: Civil servant
- Website: www.shankarbidari.com

Shankar Mahadev Bidari is an Indian Police Service (IPS) officer, who was the Director General and Inspector General of Police (DGP) of the state of Karnataka.

An Indian Police Service officer of the 1978 cohort, he was the Police Commissioner of Bangalore. Bidari comes from Banahatti City in Bagalkot District, Karnataka. He was succeeded as DG & IGP by Abdul Rahman Infant in March 2012. The Karnataka High Court had held the Special Task Force under his command responsible for rape and torture of women. The Karnataka High Court dubbed him worse than Saddam Hussein or Gaddafi for his role as the leader of the Task Force that was responsible for fake encounters, gang-rapes and harassment of tribals.

== Family background ==
Shankar Bidari's family has five civil servants from a single family. Bidari comes from a Lingayat family. Bidari's daughter Vijayalakshmi Bidari, IAS undertook the Civil Services Examination in 2001. Her husband Mallikarjuna Prasanna, an IPS officer is a DCP in Mumbai. His son Vijayendra Bidari, an IPS officer is the Deputy Joint Director of CBI of Delhi. His wife Rohini Bhajibhakare, IAS from Solapur is a probationer working as collector in Salem, Tamil Nadu. Shankar Bidari's wife Umadevi, a doctor, is the only non-IAS and non-IPS person in the family.

== Awards and honours ==
- Karnataka Chief Minister’s Gold Medal in 1989
- Andhra Pradesh Mukyamantri Shourya Padakam in 1990.
- Karnataka Chief Minister’s Gold Medal for the 2nd time in 1991.
- The Police Medal for Gallantry in 1991.
- President’s Police Medal for Meritorious service in 1995.
- President’s Police Medal for Distinguished Service in 2003.
- First Bar to the Police Medal for Gallantry in 2011.

Institutions and associations have given him titles such as "Vishwashri", "Kayakashri", "Basawashri" award, carrying a cash component of Rs.5 Lakhs by Shree Murga Mutt, Chitradurga in the year 2012 in recognition of his service, "Tippu Sultan Award", "Sri Vishveshwaraiah Award", "Pride of Karnataka", "Shishunala Shariff Award", "Kumara Rama Award", "Karnatakashri Award", "Mallikarjun Mansoor Award", "Sangolli Rayanna award", "Dr. Ambedkar Award".

== Karnataka High Court Order set aside by the Supreme Court of India ==
On 30 March 2012, the Karnataka High Court, in response to a petition filed by then most senior IPS officer of Karnataka DGP Abdul Rahman Infant challenging the appointment of Shankar Bidari as Karnataka Director General, struck down Bidari’s appointment. This appears related to Bidari's role as commandant of a Special Task Force to tackle Veerappan. The decision by the High Court for removal of Bidari was based on the decision taken by the Central Administrative Tribunal (CAT), Bangalore bench, on 16 March 2012, which quashed the appointment of Shankar M Bidari as DG&IGP of Karnataka. It then directed the Karnataka State Government to appoint Infant as DG&IGP of Karnataka on an ad hoc basis.

He referred an appeal to the Supreme Court which gave a judgement exonerating him of allegations, and held that the order of the High Court was not correct. He retired after 34 years of service, in May 2012.
