= Maa Naa Chowdappa =

M. N. Chowdappa
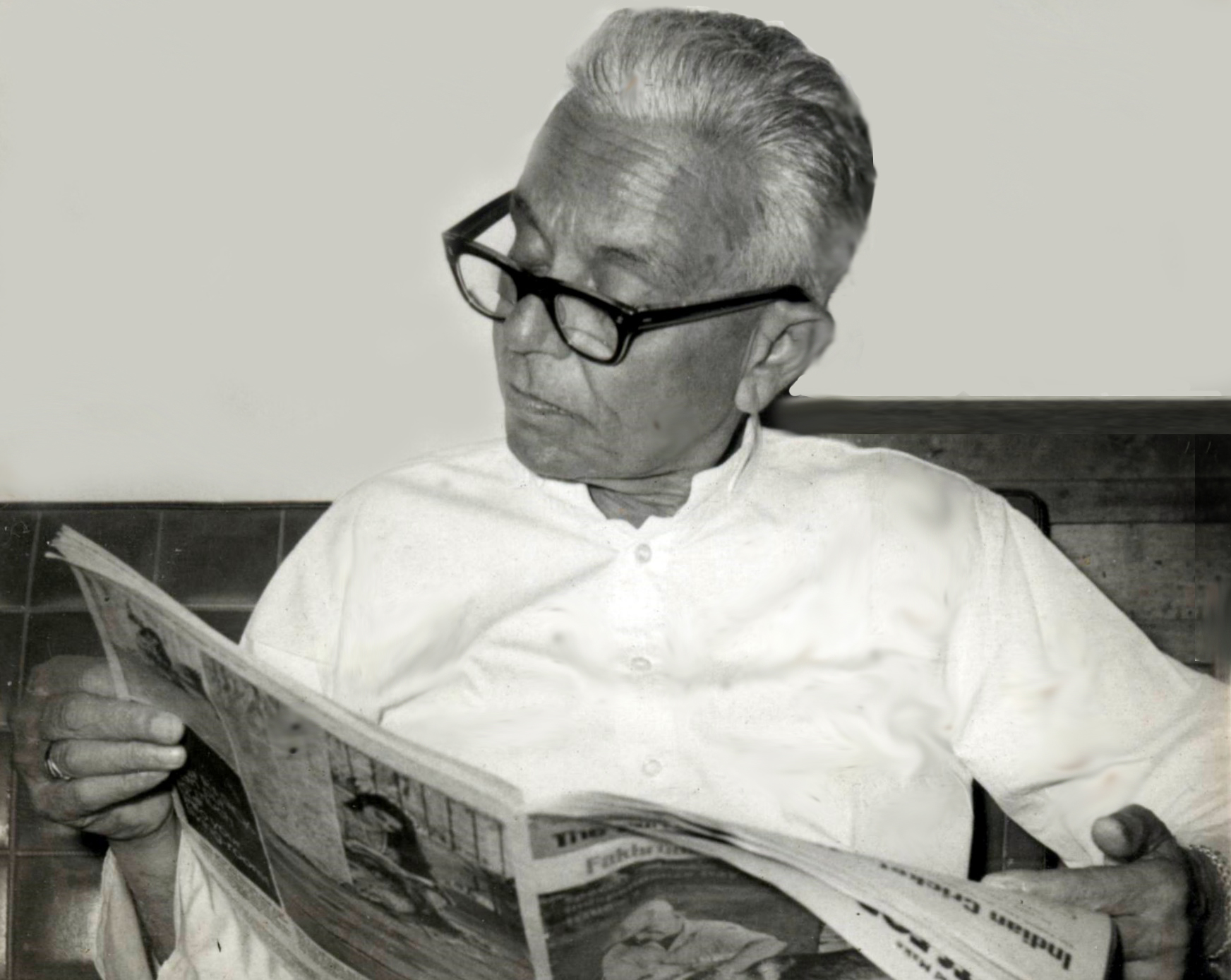
- Born: 29 July 1909; Karnataka, India
- Died: 20 February 1985 (aged 75); Bangalore, Karnataka, India
- Occupations: Journalist, Novelist, Radio Broadcaster
- Writing career
- Genres: History, Editing, Translation and Contemporary writing

M. N. Chowdappa was an Indian journalist, broadcaster and author born in July 1909.

Chowdappa completed his intermediate in Mysore. During his student days he developed an interest in literature, radio broadcasting and theatre under influence of his Guru N. Kasturi.

Chowdappa started his career at Akashavani ("All India Radio"), Mysore and Madras. Later Chowdappa was associated with B.N. Gupta in launching and editing Prajamatha (an illustrated weekly magazine in the Kannada language). During the pre-independence days, the erstwhile Kingdom of Mysore was under the control of the British and Prajamatha was banned for its pro-nationalistic stance. At this juncture Chowdappa shifted to Hubli (which was at that time part of Mysore State) and published Prajamatha from there.

Chowdappa worked for Samyukta Karnataka (a Kannada daily) and was the first editor of Vakchitra (the first Kannada magazine dedicated to films and other fine arts). He also worked for Kathanjali and other publications. Later he joined Bangalore station of All India Radio as a co-producer for features and worked till 1969.

Post retirement, Chowdappa worked for Congress Sandesha (a magazine of Indian National Congress). In 1972, Shri Devaraj Urs, the then Chief Minister of Karnataka invited Chowdappa to be his press secretary. Chowdappa also got an invitation from writer Niranjana to be one of the editors for Gnana Gangothri (an encyclopedia project in Kannada). His passion for literature and history made Chowdappa to choose the encyclopedia project instead of being a press secretary to the Chief Minister.

Chowdappa had a vast knowledge of Karnataka history, especially of the Karnataka dynasties, culture and literature. Hence he was requested by editors of various encyclopedias to contribute articles.

A simple person who never bragged about his achievements, Chowdappa was hailed by friends as a silent worker.

== Books/novels ==
- Shri Krishna Bhoopala
- Kunthi
- Kumara sambhava (drama)
- Chandragupta (drama)
- Vidura
- P. Kodanda Rao
- Sir. K. Sheshadri Iyer

== Journalism ==
- Kathanjali
- Prajamatha
- Samukta Karnataka
- Vakchitra

== Awards ==
- Shri Krisha Bhoopala won the state Sahitya Academy award
- He was honoured on the occasion of Golden Jubilee of the Indian and also Kannada films as the senior most film journalist.
- Kunti, a novel on the Mahabaratha character of Kunti was prescribed as a text book for high school second years for two consecutive years in the 1950s.
