= Thatt Antha Heli =

- Genre: Game show
- Directed by: Arathy H. N.
- Presented by: N. Someswara
- Country of origin: India
- Original language: Kannada
- No. of episodes: 5,015

Production
- Producers: Mahesh Joshi; Usha Kini; Arathy H. N. Raghu G.
- Production locations: Bangalore, Karnataka, India
- Running time: approx. 30 minutes

Original release
- Network: DD Chandana
- Release: 4 January 2002 – present

Thatt Antha Heli?! is an Indian television game show (quiz show) in Kannada language. Shot in and telecast from the DD Chandana station in Bangalore, the show was first aired on 4 January 2002 and in 2012 entered the Limca Book of Records upon completing 1,756 episodes. In October 2025, the show completed 5,000 episodes.

== Description ==
This show has completed over 3,000 episodes without any sponsorship. The host is N. Someswara. Each episode has three participants, who answer 12 questions in different fields such as education, science and technology, culture, and heritage. Each correct answer earns the contestant a new book. The show is telecast from 09:30 PM to 10:00 PM in DD Chandana channel from Monday to Friday. The re-run is telecast next day between 11.30 AM to 12:00 PM.In 2023 the number of questions has been reduced from 12 to 10.

== Rules ==
1. Total of 10 questions and each question has four options.
2. Each question carries 10 points.
1. If correct answer is given before the options are announced, two books are awarded instead of one.
2. Even if a person gives a correct answer as a third person, he/she gets no points.
3. If a person crosses 100 points, as an encouragement, a special CD is given as a gift.
4. No negative tricks are allowed.
5. The quiz is open to any one aged above 14 years. No maximum age limit.
6. The interested may write a letter to DD Chandana with their basic information like name, gender, age, address, educational qualification, hobbies and contact information.

== Type of Questions ==
The quiz questions includes Kannada Idioms and phrases, Kannada proverbs, Kannada riddles, Kannada jumble word, Kannada cross-word, Kannada word synonyms and a mental calculation Math problem. It has a picture question also. Usually there are two visual questions. One is exclusively meant for identifying Kannada poets/litterateurs and other visual question is related to identifying a Plant species or an Animal, Identifying a celebrity, a place etc. The Final question is a bumper question, which can earn 4 books. This question also includes 3 clues. Apart from these there are questions on State, National and international importance. If no clue is used, the contestant gets all four books. If one clue is used, three books are given, Two books if two clues used and a single book if all the three clues are used. This question is supposed to be toughest of the lot.
