= Abdul Rahman Infant =

Indian director general and inspector general of police

Abdul Rahman Infant IPS (A.R. Infant IPS) (born June 23, 1952), was the former director general and inspector general of police (DGP & IG) in the state of Karnataka, India. His appointment was announced by the Karnataka state home minister R. Ashoka on 31 of March 2012 following a state high court order directing the removal of its current DGP & IG Shankar Bidari and replacing the DGP & IG position with Infant. However Shankar Bidri was later cleared of these allegations by Supreme Court of India. He hails from Kerala. He was born in Paravoor in Kollam district.
