= Karanth =

Karanth is a surname. Notable people with the surname include:

- B. V. Karanth, Indian theatre personality from Karnataka
  - BV Karanth:Baba, a 2012 Indian film about him
- K. Shivaram Karanth, major Kannada writer, social reformer, environmentalist, artist, movie maker
- K. Ullas Karanth, Indian conservation zoologist
- Prema Karanth, Indian theatre personality
