= Mala Honnatti =

Indian mountaineer

Mala Honnatti is an Indian mountain climber, trekker, and former bank employee.

== Biography ==
She insisted that she was a studious girl during her childhood and she paid firm attention on her studies to gain good grades at college entrance examinations. She pursued both Bachelor of Science and Bachelor of Laws. She hails from Karnataka.

== Career ==
She developed an ardent interest and passion towards adventure sports during her 30s. After making a career-defining move by venturing into adventure sports, she broke the stereotypes about the patriarchal mindset that has been incorporated within the typical traditional South Indian family backdrop, where girls are generally groomed only for education and marriage. In 1984, she had applied to enroll in a trekking program in Chandrakhani, Himachal Pradesh. She then agreed for a low-altitude programme organised by the Youth Hostels Association of India. Her decision to join the trekking program at that time marked a significant milestone in her career aspirations towards fulfilling her goals of exploring the adventure.

She then joined the Himalayan Mountaineering Institute, Darjeeling, in 1986. She successfully climbed 12 mountain ranges in India including Stok Kangri, and Mount Kilimanjaro. She also engaged in running marathons to enhance her fitness levels and she also began practicising karate as part of her physical training activities. As of 2024, she had established a significant track record of having completed a record tally of 26 full marathons and two ultra-marathons across the world in her lifetime.

She set a new record by becoming the first Indian woman to complete the Antarctica Ice Marathon & 100k ultra race. She also successfully competed in the 2011 edition of the Everest Base Camp Marathon. At the age of 62, in April 2015, she made ambitious efforts to realize the dream of conquering Mount Everest. However, due to a deadly fatal earthquake which rocked the entirety of Nepal, claiming the lives of over 8000 people, her planned expedition was called off, thereby putting an end to her goal of reaching the summit of Mount Everest. She nearly missed out on setting a new record of being the oldest male or female Indian to successfully climb Mount Everest. In an exclusive to The Better India, she recalled the memories of her gearing up for Mount Everest summit in April 2015 and she insisted that she was reading a book inside the dining tent, at the time when tremors struck the area. The earthquake was a vital blow for her in terms of finance, as she spent INR 23 lakhs for the preparation.
