= N. S. Narendra =

N S Narendra
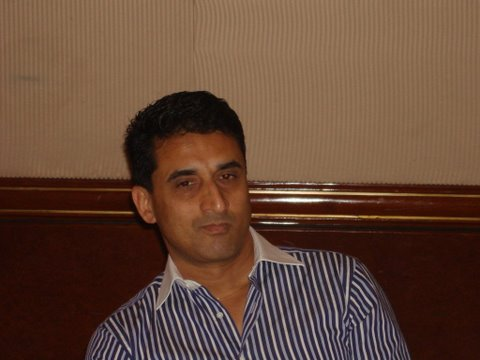
- Born: Coorg, Karnataka
- Education: University of Mysore
- Occupation: Founder of FirePro Systems

N S Narendra is the chairman and managing director of FirePro Systems. He founded Firepro in 1992 with the intent of providing a professional platform in the Fire Solutions and Security space. He is a first-generation entrepreneur and has scaled up Firepro Systems to a leadership position in the Fire Safety and Security industry in less than decades.

== Early life ==
Narendra's father was an engineer in the KEB. Narendra was an Electronics engineering graduate from Mysore University's National Institute of Engineering in the year 1990, specialising in electronics. Narendra had been selected to join the army but he chose not to join at the last moment.

== FirePro ==
Firepro is a company that has been providing integrated solutions for fire protection, security and building management systems. It takes an integrated approach towards providing fire protection and security and was catering to a fast-moving construction industry. Narendra says, "I started with just Rs 10,000 which were my savings. It was just less money and a lot of ambition."

In 2008 when the real estate market suffered a setback, FirePro was affected. But in 2011, with N.S. Narendra as the chairman of Firepro Systems, the company became a leader in its sector. It had 1,300 employees and a business of Rs. 700 crore. The company went global early and used to get 25% of its revenues from overseas. However that same year, the company ran into a financial crisis and was unable to pay some of its employees. On 11 May 2012, Panasonic announced plans to acquire a 76.2% stake in Firepro Systems. Ever since Firepro is a part of Panasonic Corporation, Japan.
