= S. S. Murthy =

S. S. Murthy is a senior professor at Indian Institute of Technology Delhi. He has taught for 40 years at IIT Delhi, IIT Ropar, BITS Pilani, NSIT Delhi.

== Early life and education ==
Murthy was born in Shikaripur, Karnataka, India, in 1946. He received his B.E., M.Tech. and Ph.D.degrees respectively from Bangalore University, Indian Institute of Technology (IIT) Bombay, and IIT Delhi.

== Teaching and research ==
After serving a year at BITS Pilani he became faculty member at IIT Delhi. He became a professor in 1983. He has held many visiting Positions in India and abroad, including Visiting Fellow, University of Newcastle (UK); Visiting Professor, University of Calgary (Canada); Visiting Consultant, Kirloskar Electric Company; Director, ERDA Baroda; Adjunct Prof. IISc Bangalore; and Director of NITK, Surathkal.

== Publications ==
Murthy has published about 200 research papers in international journals and presentations at conferences. In 1962, he was awarded the Prime Minister of India Prize in the electrical engineering division for his paper 'Modern Trends in Construction and Maintenance of Transmission Lines'.

Murthy holds four patents concerning the self-excited induction generator, Micro Hydel Applications and a novel-braking scheme. He has also transferred technology of self-excited and grid connected induction generators to industry for low-and medium-power generation under standalone or grid connected mode using energy sources such as wind, wave, small hydro, biomass, and fossil fuels. He designed the first indigenous 55 kW wind electric generator for Kirloskar Electric. in 1987 which was installed in field. He developed 150 kW generator for wave energy which was installed near Trivandrum. He has transferred technology on a novel generator for portable gensets to industry. The indigenous technology developed by him under a DST funded project was used to install five Pico hydro stand alone power plants in Karnataka. He has completed over 100 industry sponsored research and constancy projects dealing with electrical machines, drives, and energy systems. He was instrumental in establishing up to date energy audit and energy conservation facilities at IIT under World Bank funding.

As a professor, Murthy has contributed to curriculum development in electrical engineering for AICTE at IIT Delhi, and has set up three new UG/PG programs there. He is frequently interviewed by the press as an expert in electrical systems and engineering.

In 2009, Murthy was the Faculty Association chairman at ITT Delhi.

IN 2013, Murthy was appointed Vice Chancellor of the Central University of Karnataka, Gulbarga. His first task there was to integrate the various elements of the engineering program.
