= Khedinji Kanthappa Hegde =

Khedinji Kanthappa Hegde, better known as K. K. Hegde, was an Indian politician from the Indian National Congress who the Minister of Health in the Government of Karnataka (then known as Mysore State).
