= Dattatreya Aralikatte =

Indian puppeteer and teacher

Dr. Dattatreya Aralikatte, known in Karnataka as Datta (born 22 February 1953) is three time National Award winner and an Indian puppeteer and a teacher. He was born in Aralikatte village, in the Chikkamagaluru district of Karnataka, India, and resides in Bangalore, India. He heads the "Putthali Kalaranga" (Puppet Theater), a well known traditional puppet theater group in India.

== Early life ==
Datta grew up in Aralikatte and graduated from high school from Basarikatte school. He is born to a Gandhian father, M.S. Ramarao and Lalithamma. He earned his Bachelor of Arts and in Bachelor of Education Degrees from the Mysore University and Master of Arts and Master of Education from the Bangalore University. Being a student, he was very much interested in the field of theater.

His first endeavour with theater was during his college days and then on, theater has been an indispensable part of his life. He worked with playwrights and senior theater persons like Parvatha Vani and Dr. B.S. Narayana Rao both in Kannada and Sanskrit languages. As he excelled in the field of theater, he got inspired to write his own plays, keeping in mind the current social problems, amalgamated with inclusion of mythological characters in his plays. He has highlighted problems such as pollution, deforestation, and adulteration in his plays.

He is married to Ramamani Dattatreya, who assists him with his theater and has two sons, Karthik Datta and Manohar Datta who live in Houston, Texas. They assist their father in his puppetry talks occasionally.

== Plays ==
The theater has efficiently adopted plays like Sri Krishna Thulabhara, Lankadahana, Kumara Sambhava, Sri Krishna Digvijaya. The plays convey the myths and realities of life, thus supporting a moral in each play adorned with classical music along with Yakshagana beats, making it a complete show.

Datta, as a part of his educational plans for his students, has taken many chapters in textbooks; to name a few, Panchatantra, Buddha's Life.

Mudrika style puppeteer

=== Synopsis ===
The troupe is famous for its Kumara Sambhava (Birth of Lord Kumara) shows. The story: during the mythological churning of the ocean, the celestial nectar that was produced was rightfully handed over to the Devas (The Gods) and they became immortal after consuming it. The Rakshasas (The Demons) too felt the need to become immortal and one amongst them was Tarakasura. He performed severe penance to propitiate Lord Brahma and ask him to grant immortality. But lord Brahma granted him invincibility instead, with the exception of defeat from Lord Shiva's son Kumara.

Tarakasura knew about the demise of Dakshayani the erstwhile consort of Lord Shiva at her father Daksha's Yagna and he also knew that Lord Shiva himself was in deep penance in the Himalayas. That Lord Shiva would again get married immediately and a son begot did not seem probable to Tarakasura and hence the prospect of his impending death at the hands of Kumara (Shiva's son) did not frighten him. After receiving the boon of invincibility, Taraka became a tyrant causing trouble to one and all.

The Devas who had to bear the brunt of the newly acquired prowess of Taraka turned to Lord Vishnu for advice and protection. Lord Vishnu summoned Manmatha, and entrusted him with the dangerous task of breaking Lord Shiva's penance and make him fall in love with Parvathi who was in the vicinity undertaking a severe penance to win over Lord Shiva. Manmatha arrived on the location and performed his task which eventually led him being reduced to ashes, when lord Shiva opened his third eye.

Lord Shiva after testing Parvathi's love and devotion towards him in a few subtle ways married her. The birth of Kumara ensued and this led to the slaying of Tarakasura ending his tyranny.

== Guru ==
He learned practical puppetry under his Guru M.R. Ranganatha Rao, a Central Sangeet Natak Akademi Award Winner. He understood the philosophical meaning under Sriranga Mahaguru, the founder of the "AshtangaYoga Vijnana Mandiram" a spiritual Centre and Sri Sri RangaPriya Swamiji. As a result, he established his own puppet theater called "Putthali Kalaranga", evolving a new style in the field of Puppet Theater called "Mudrika Style".

== The theater ==
His puppets weigh around 8 to 10 kg, ornamented with traditional sarees. The movements are made by jerking them with iron rods thus making them lively. His plays have got easy conversation, classical Karnatic music with melodious tunes.

== Recognition ==
Recognizing his contribution in this field, he has been bestowed several State, National and International awards. He was conferred with the prestigious Sangeet Natak Academi Award for his outstanding contribution to the field of Puppetry by the President of India Ram Nath Kovind on January 17, 2018. In addition, he has won the Karnataka Janapadha Yakshagana Academy Award, CCRT Presidents' National Award, India, American Biographical Center, North Carolina, USA and International Biographical Center, Cambridge, UK. Datta was chosen by the Karnataka Janapada and Yakshagana Academy for its Annual award for 1996. He has also been honored by Directorate of State Educational Research & Training for using "Puppetry as an Educational Aid." He has participated in several puppet festivals and seminars in India and abroad. The prestigious Centre for Cultural Research and Training "Teachers Award" for 1996 has been a feather in his cap. His name is included in World Puppeteer's Encyclopedia.

The Indian Government, Ministry of Human Resource and Development on recognizing Mr. Datta's contribution to the educational field and puppetry has bestowed him with the national award as the Best Teacher for the year 2004. He has conducted several workshops and shows in India and around the world. His visit to Iran, Brazil, South America, Israel and the United States has got him and his nation, great recognition. The media has featured him several times Several live interviews have been telecasted throughout South America, the United States, Canada, Mexico, India and Iran. His works have been lauded by the Media and the public. His name is included in the "Who's Who" general knowledge book and Asia Pacific Men of Arts and Culture. Through his puppet theatre he has been serving the Society and the field of Arts. He is also a Resource person in the field of Geo-Sciences and Arts.

Other awards include Karnataka State Janapada Yakshagana Award, DSERT State Award, Excellence in Education Award, Aryabhata award and Raghasuddhalaya Puraskar. In 2018, he was awarded an honorary Doctorate in traditional Puppetry and Teaching – 22nd Sep 2018.

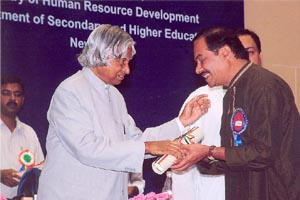
Datta receiving the National Award from Indian President Dr. Abdul Kalam (2004)

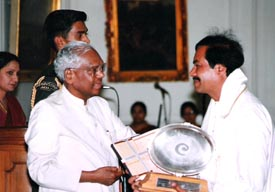
Datta receiving the National Award from Indian President Dr. K. R. Narayanan(1998)

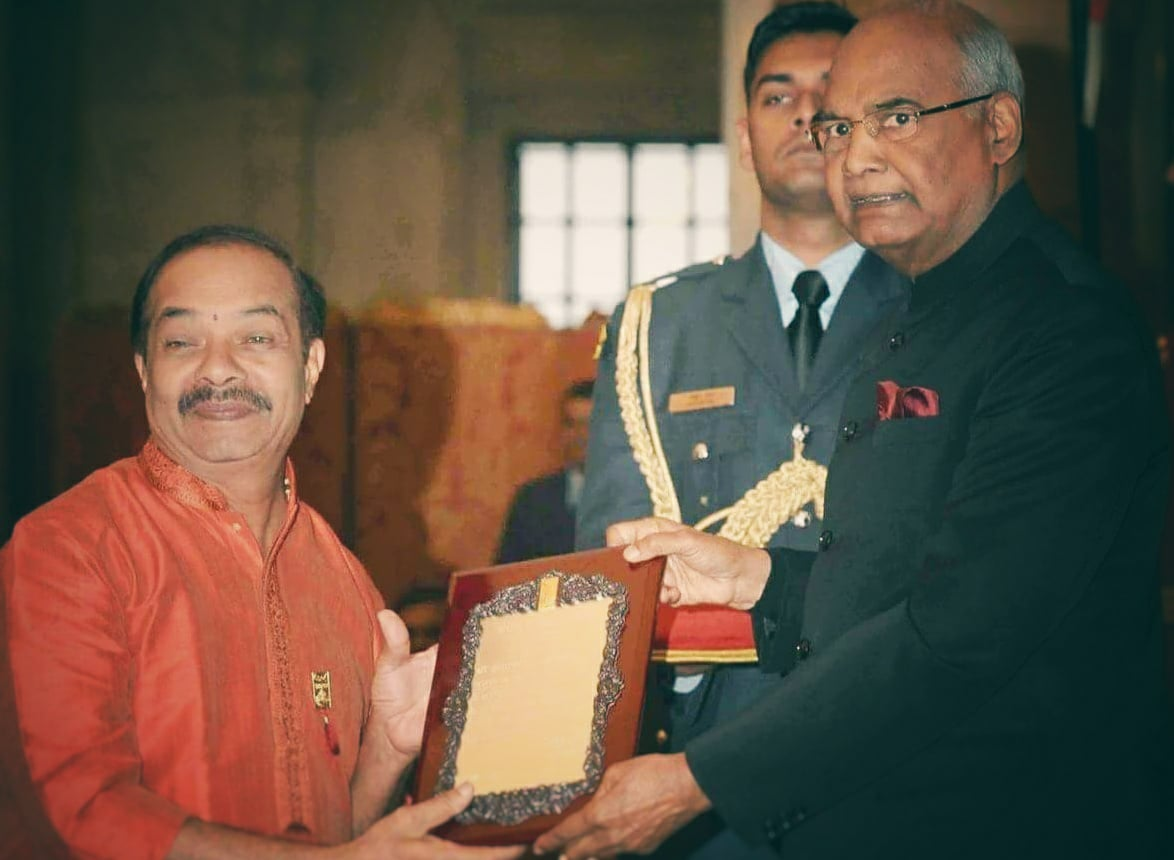
Datta receiving the National Award from Indian President Dr. Ram Nath Kovind (2018)

== Philosophy ==
Mudrika Style: Datta's Puppet shows are temple-based and of Mudrika Style. Mudrika means "Mudra" or impression of God, Culture and Tradition. Mudra aims at preserving for the future generation, the philosophy of life, the philosophy of culture and tradition. Mudra symbolizes Union of God and the Soul. This Philosophy is stressed in Mudrika style puppet theatre.

Natya Shastra is an ancient script which deals with Indian Dance and Drama. "Abhinaya" (acting, expression and movement) is important here. Vaachikabhinaya (facial expression), Aangikabhinaya (body expression) together constitute Abhinaya. This aspect receives more importance in Mudrika style puppet theatre and leaves a lasting impression on the minds and the hearts of the audience. The costume design for the puppets is done keeping in view the essential features ancient culture. Hence classical Indian dance, music and literature are an integral part of Mudrika School. The songs are based on Karnatic Classical tunes.

Putthali: Putthali in Sanskrit means the Puppet used for the performance. Manipulation of an intricate web of strings, enables the movement of the puppet.

Sutradhara: The protagonist of the show introduces the story and the characters to the audience and also performs rituals before and after the show. Some times, he narrates the story. The concept of "Sutradhara" is a gift given by the Puppet Theatre to the Indian Theatre.."
