= DD Chandana =

Indian Kannada-language television channel

- Country: India
- Broadcast area: India
- Headquarters: Bengaluru, Karnataka, India

Programming
- Language: Kannada
- Picture format: 1080i HDTV

Ownership
- Owner: Prasar Bharati

History
- Launched: 15 October 1994; 31 years ago

Links
- Website: Official Website

DD Chandana is an Indian Kannada-language state-owned television network owned and operated by Prasar Bharati under the Doordarshan network, supported by its studios in Bengaluru and Kalaburagi and serving the state of Karnataka. Originating as a relay station in Kalaburagi in 1977 and a full-fledged station in Bangalore in 1981, it was launched in 1994, and has a diverse range of programming, including entertainment and infotainment series, news and current affairs, and films. DD Chandana is terrestrially available throughout Karnataka, and available nationwide through satellite and cable platforms, including DD Free Dish. The name of the channel, chandana, means sandalwood in Kannada.

== History ==
Television in Karnataka began under the Satellite Instructional Television Experiment (SITE) from 1975 to 1976, with the experiment being conducted in the districts of Gulbarga, Bijapur, and Raichur. The broadcasts were transmitted from the television studio and relay centre in Gulbarga, covering multiple villages with television sets installed in community centres. A while following the end of the SITE experiment, the Indian government decided to restart the transmitter in Gulbarga on 3 September 1977 to meet the needs of education and development in the state.

Doordarshan established its television station via a makeshift studio in Bangalore on 1 November 1981, before India began converting to colour television. The base production centre for Doordarshan Kendra Bangalore was inaugurated on 11 November 1983, facilitating the introduction of Kannada-language news. It also began airing feature films on the same day. Doordarshan established low-power transmitter relay stations in several districts of Karnataka in 1984, covering most of the state. In 1985, the station began introducing sponsored programming following the success of Hum Log on the national network, paving the way for the first Kannada-language soap opera. On 16 January 1988, Bangalore got an advanced permanent Doordarshan studio and relay station in JC Nagar, with its first transmission occurring on 4 February. On 1 November 1990, all Doordarshan relay stations in Karnataka were hooked up to the Bangalore station. There were 23 Doordarshan relay stations established in Karnataka by the end of 1993.

A regional language satellite channel was launched on 15 August 1991, which became 24 hrs channel on 1 January 2000. This channel was commonly known as DD-9 Kannada which came to be later on renamed as "Chandana", on 5 April 2000 which true to its name has been the true cultural ambassador of the State. Doordarshan Kendra Bangalore was digitised on 23 October 2008. On 18 April 2016, DD Chandana premiered Raita Rathna, India's first interactive/reality talk show dedicated to farmers. Doordarshan Kendra Kalaburagi ceased all analogue terrestrial broadcasts on 31 October 2021, fully migrating to digital terrestrial television.

== List of programmes ==
The channel has given the audience a number of programmes of which most popular being:

- Dance Samara- Dance reality show
- Gana Chandana – Singing reality show
- Varthegalu (meaning: News) – News program
- Chitramanjari (meaning: Picture snow) – Program on Kannada film songs
- Thatt Antha Heli (meaning: Answer in a flash) – Quiz program
- Suththona Namma Nadu (meaning: Lets travel our place) – A program on Karnataka state travel guide
- Kathaa Saritha/Maalike/ (meaning: Story garland) – A showcase of numerous short stories of Kannada literature
- Karnataka Shasthreeya Sangeetha (meaning: Classical music) – Musical program
- Belagu (meaning: Lighten) – Interview program of any renowned Guest
- Chalanchitra (meaning: Movie)
- Swaraj
- Shubhodaya Karnataka (Season 1& Season 2)
- Vaarada Athithi (Guest of the week) Interview program of renowned Guest from different fields.

== See also ==
- List of programs broadcast by DD National
- All India Radio
- Ministry of Information and Broadcasting
- DD Free Dish
- List of South Asian television channels by country
