= Nachiketa Sharma =

Indian-American classical vocalist

Nachiketa (Sharma) Yakkundi
- Genres: Indian classical music
- Occupations: Vocalist, software Engineer
- Website: Ganapriya.com

Nachiketa (Sharma) Yakkundi (Kannada: ನಚಿಕೇತ, Devanagari:नचिकेत, IAST: Naciketā) is an Indian classical vocalist in the San Francisco Bay Area.

== Background ==
Born in Dharwad, Karnataka, Nachiketa was initiated into Hindustani classical vocal music by his parents. His formal study began in Madras under B. N. Simha and later under B. Hanumantachar. He then learnt from Basavaraj Rajguru.

== Career ==
Nachiketa has extensively performed in cities across India and North America. He runs Rajguru Sangeet Vidyaniketan, a school of music in the memory of his guru in Cupertino, California, a school for both adults and kids. Nachiketa was also a senior teacher at the Sangeetaanjali College of Music, Fremont for over 20 years until the institution closed its doors in October, 2015.

== Discography ==
- Samarpan (May 2002)
- Hindustani Vocal (May 2000)
- Dasa compositions in Kannada - Rama nama payasa (May 2002)
- Vachanas in Kannada - Neenolidare (May 2002)
- A two-CD Hindustani album titled Guru Naman consisting of nine raagas (May 2007)
- Sumiran Karle composed of seven Hindi bhajans, three composed by Nachiketa himself. (May 2007)
