= Bapu Padmanabha =

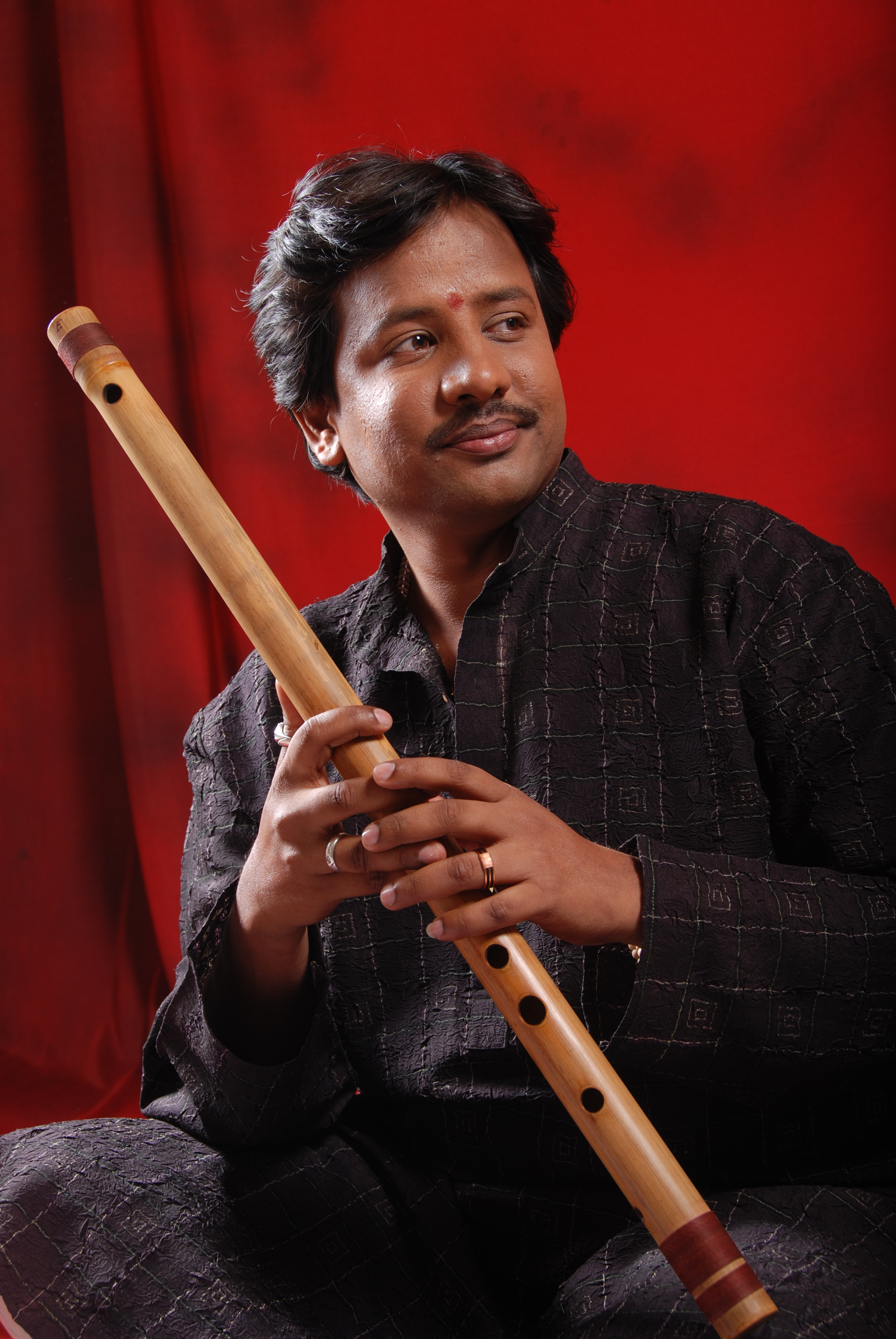
- Portrait of Bapu Padmanabha, flutist and music composer

Background information
- Born: 18 November 1978 (age 47); Harihar, Karnataka, India
- Genres: Hindustani classical music, mantra, film scores, Indian classical, Vachana sahitya, meditation, world music
- Occupations: Flutist, music director, composer, singer, record producer
- Instruments: Bansuri, flautist, singer
- Years active: 1999–present
- Labels: Lahari Music, TuneCore
- Website: bapuflute.com

Bapu Padmanabha, also known as Bapu Flute, is an Indian bansuri flautist, vocalist, and music director. He performs Hindustani classical music on his bansuri, a type of bamboo flute, and is also known for meditative flute music, Vachana-based compositions, and work in Kannada cinema. He was born on 18 November 1978 in Harihar, which is in Davanagere district of Karnataka state in India.

He received the National Film Award for Best Music Direction (Songs) and Best Music Direction (Background Score) at the 64th National Film Awards for the Kannada feature film "Allama".

His music has been included in the Government of India's cultural series "Music as Therapy", released by the Public Diplomacy Division of the Ministry of External Affairs. Several of these albums are catalogued internationally by the National Academic Library of the Republic of Kazakhstan (NABRK) as part of India's cultural outreach collections.

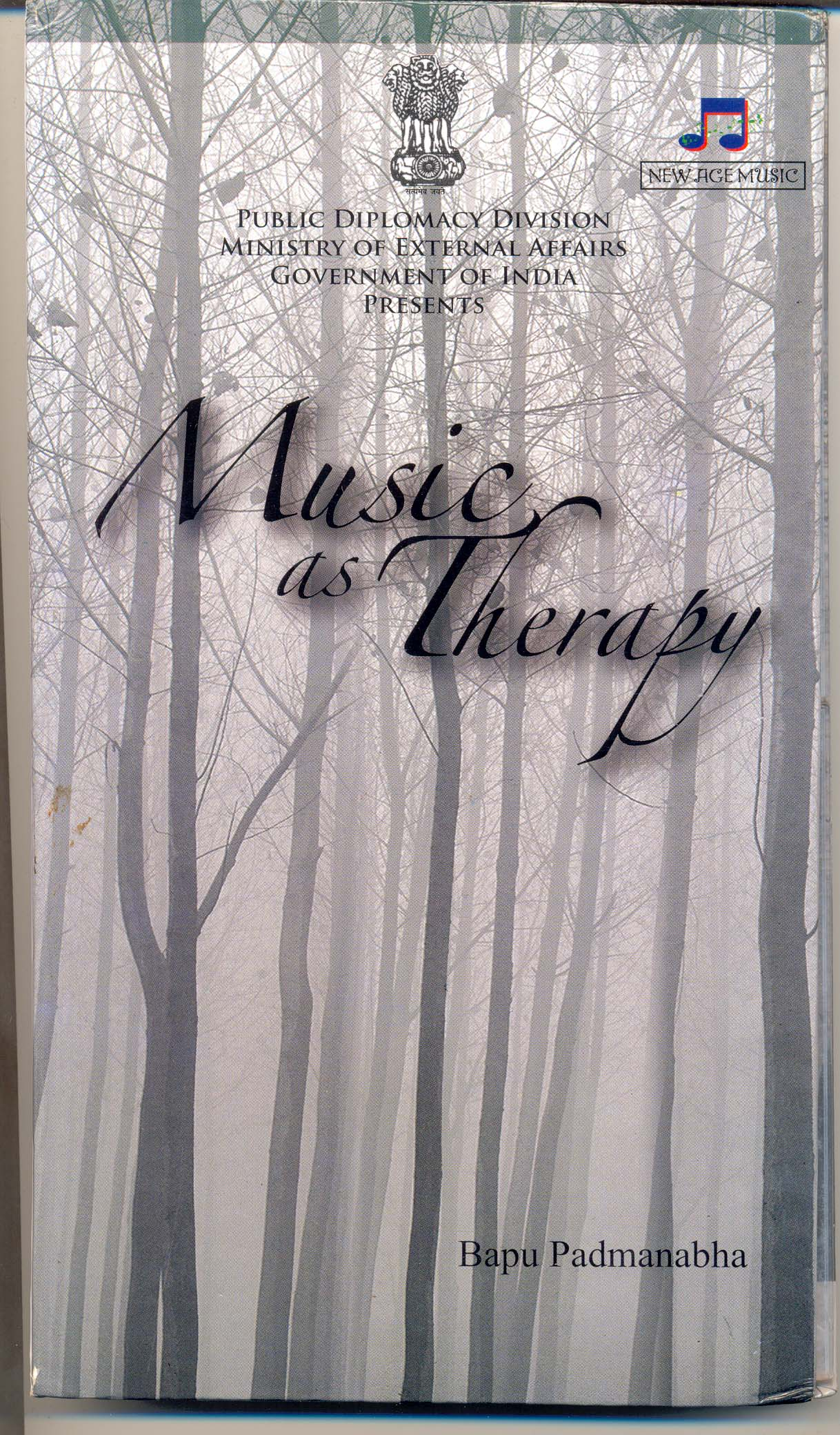
Bapu Padmanabha presenting the "Music as Therapy" album released by the Government of India's Ministry of External Affairs

== Early life ==
Bapu Padmanabha was born in Harihar, Karnataka. His interest in the bansuri began after purchasing a flute at the Sannakki Veerabhadreshwara Jatra in Hospet. While studying Tool and Die Making at the Government Tool Room and Training Centre (GTTC), Hospet, he continued to pursue music alongside his technical education. In September 1999, following a brief audition performance, he was accepted as a disciple of Padmavibhushan Pt. Hariprasad Chaurasia at the Brindavan Gurukul in Mumbai.

== Musical Training ==
Bapu received training from:

- Hariprasad Chaurasia – Hindustani classical bansuri (from 1999)
- Vidwan Mandolin Prasad – Light music improvisation, Ragashree music academy (2008–2022)
- Vidwan Ravishankar Sharma – South Indian rhythmic studies and taala structures, Shruthi Sindoora Music Academy (2009–2019)
- Veda Murthy Sri Dattatreya Bhat – Vedic Mantra chantings Shankara Veda Patha Shaala Omkar Mutt (1990–1997)

His early musical exposure and transition toward formal classical training were discussed in a 2013 interview published in the Kannada newspaper "Kannada Prabha".

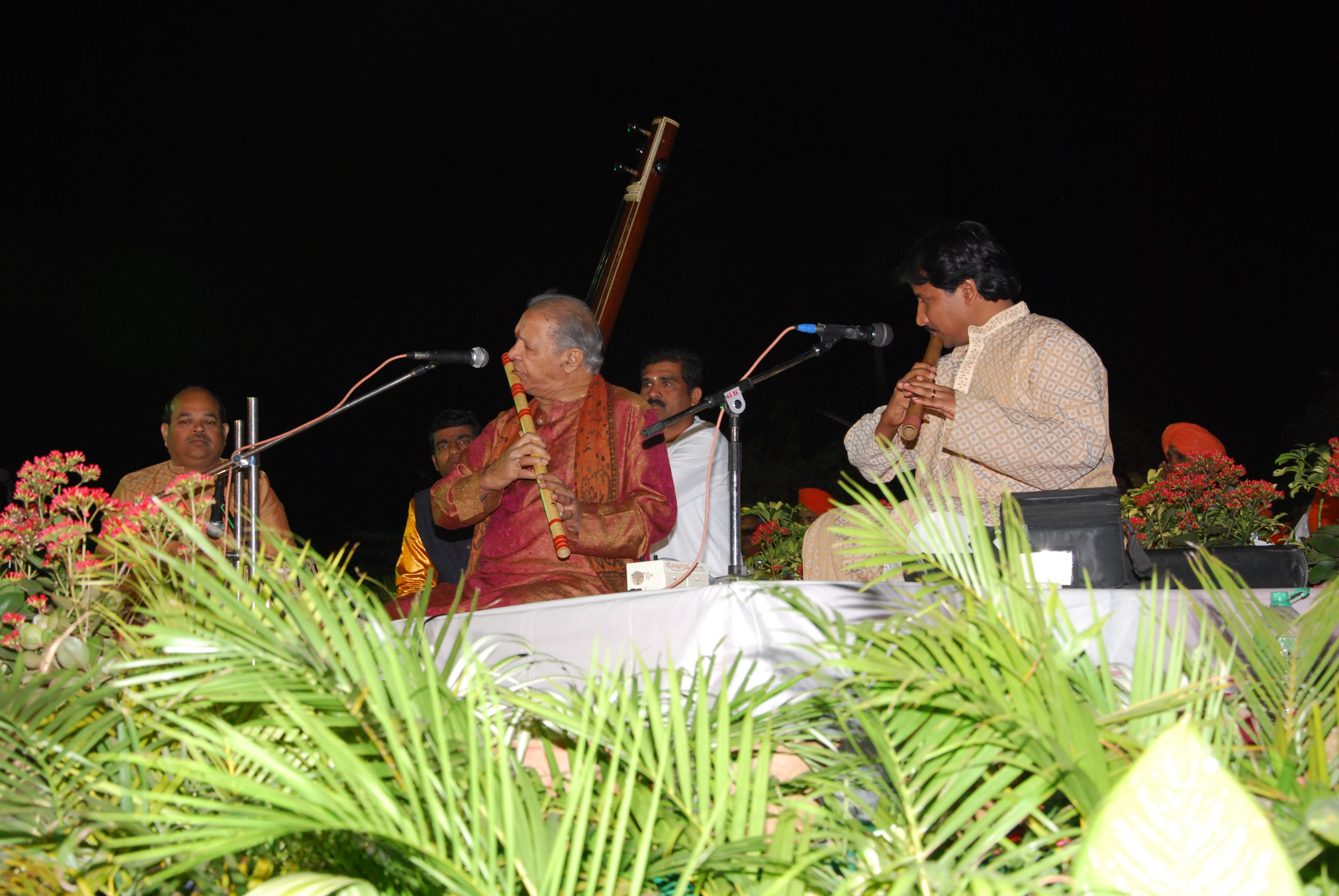
Padmanabha accompanying his Guru Hariprasad Chaurasia during a performance

== Career ==
=== Performance and collaborations ===
Bapu performs Hindustani classical flute concerts and has collaborated with musicians from Germany, Italy, Australia, and the Czech Republic. He has performed duet flute concerts with Czech flautist Jan Kyncl and participated in meditation-based music programmes, including performances at the OSHO International Commune between 2003 and 2006.

He has recorded with Indian playback singers such as Shankar Mahadevan, Hariharan_(singer), Shaan_(singer), Rajesh_Krishnan and Sangeetha_Katti.

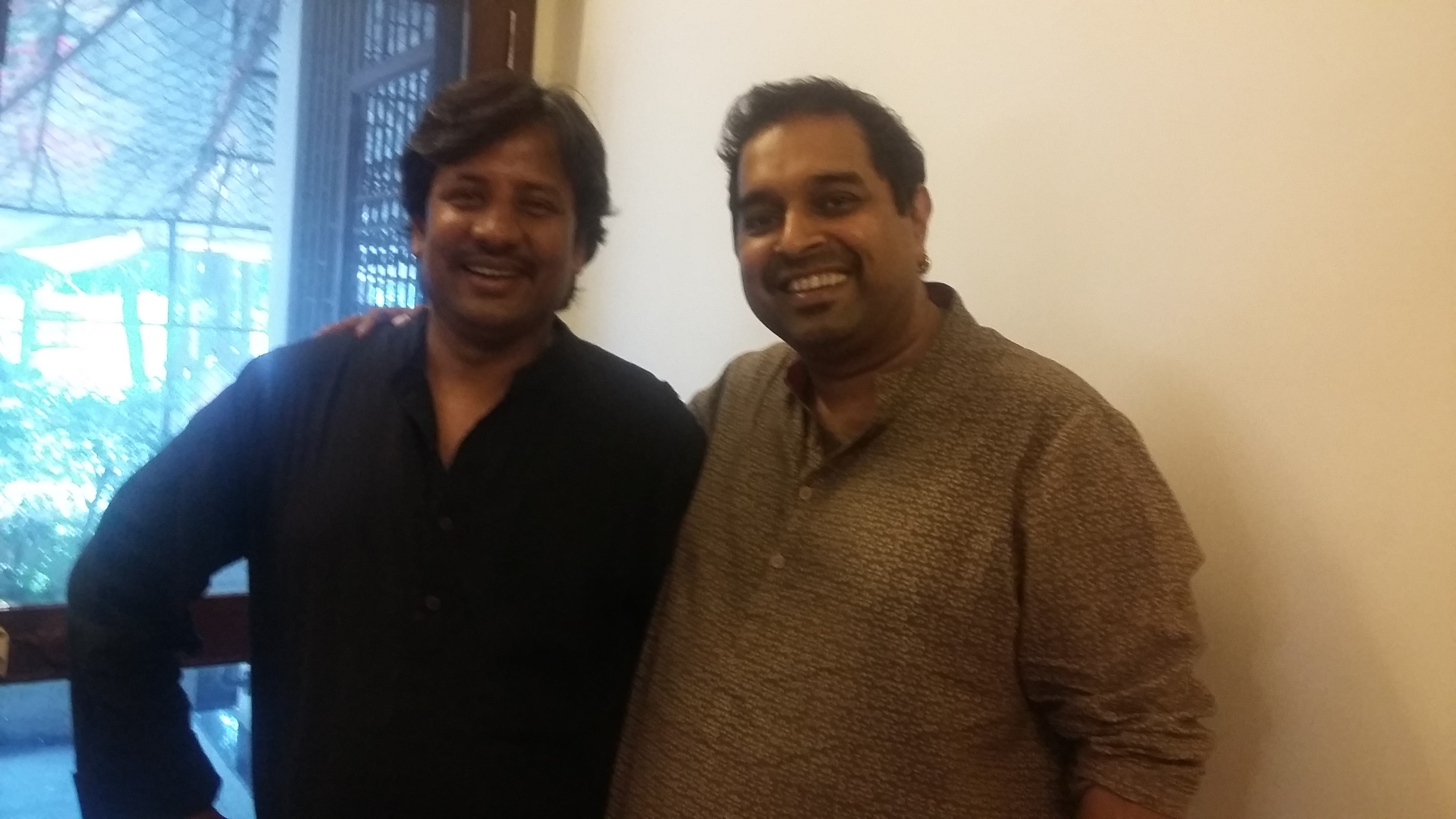
Bapu Padmanabha with Shankar Mahadevan during a studio recording

His work encompasses Hindustani classical music, mantra chanting, ambient music, and world music. In the Kannada feature film "Allama", he employed elements from Hindustani and Carnatic music traditions alongside contemporary textures to interpret Vachana literature.

A concert review published in "Vijaya Karnataka" discussed his approach to raga development and meditative phrasing in live performance.

== Film music ==
Padmanabha composed the music for the Kannada feature film "Allama" (2016), directed by T. S. Nagabharana. The film's soundtrack and background score earned him the National Film Award for Best Music Direction (Songs) and Best Music Direction (Background Score).

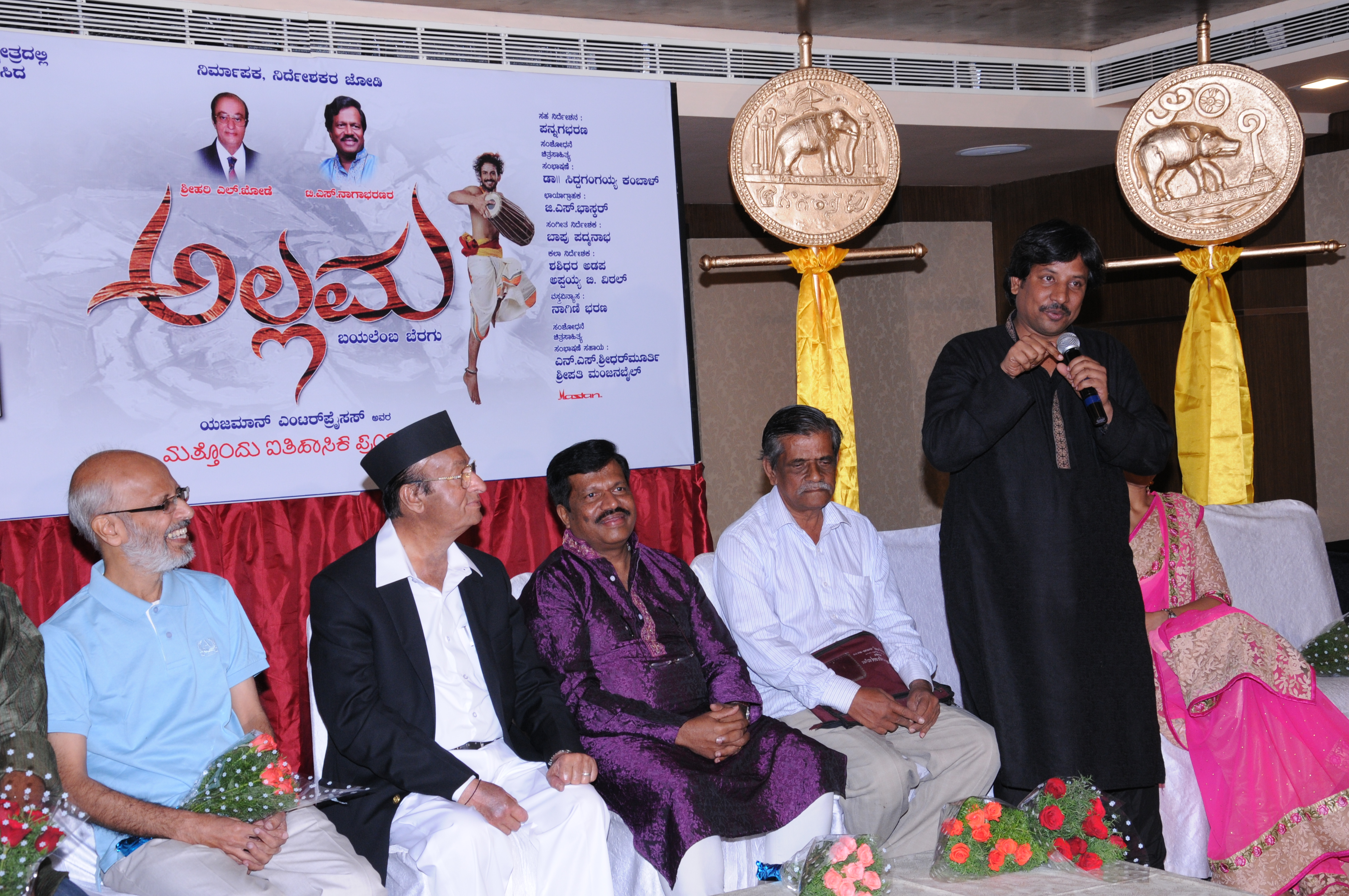
Padmanabha at the press meet for the film Allama

He later composed music for another Kannada feature film, "Genius Mutta" (2024), directed by Nagini Bharana and starring Vijay Raghavendra.

=== Digital presence ===
Bapu's music is available on major streaming platforms. Publicly accessible streaming analytics list him among artists categorized under Hindustani classical music; these listings are based on aggregated platform data.

== Awards and recognition ==
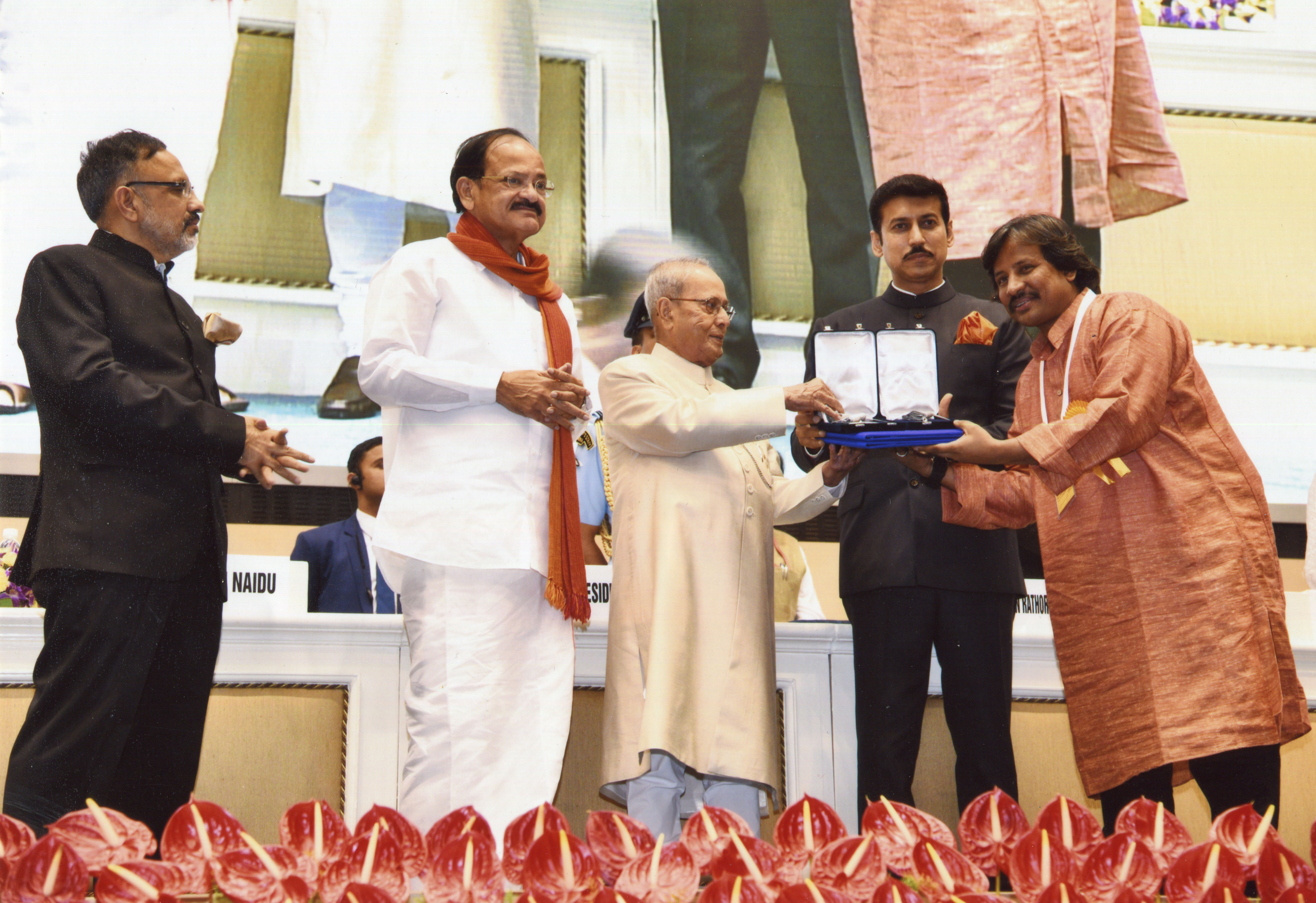
Bapu Padmanabha receiving the National Film Award

- National Film Award for Best Music Direction (Songs) – Allama (2016)
- National Film Award for Best Music Direction (Background Score) – Allama (2016)
- Pannadevi Music Scholarship awarded by Hariprasad Chaurasia (1999)

== Discography ==
Bapu Padmanabha released albums across Hindustani classical music, meditation, Vachana-based compositions, Vedic chantings, and film music. Selected work includes:

=== Audio albums ===
- "Vividha" (2005)
- "Des" (2005)
- "Meditation Flute" (2012)
- "Journey with Shiva" (2012)
- "Rudra Chantings" (2013)
- "Bamboo Flute Music for Pranayama" (2014)
- "Allama – Original Motion Pictures Sound Track" (2016)
- "Chill Flute" (2024)
- "Adi Shankaracharya Stotras" (2024)
- "Angadinda Lingadedege" Vol 1–3 (2025)

== Filmography ==
=== As music director ===
- "Allama" (2016)
- "Genius Mutta" (2024)

== Influences and style ==
Bapu's music reflects the influence of Hariprasad Chaurasia, Indian spiritual traditions, Hindustani and Carnatic musical elements, and Vachana_sahitya.
