= Malladihalli Raghavendra =

Indian Hindu guru (1890–1996)

Tiruka
- Born: 27 July 1890; Barkur Karnataka, India
- Died: 21 August 1996; Bangalore, India
- Occupations: Teacher of Yoga and Ayurveda, author
- Writing career
- Notable works: Swayum Vaidya (Ayurvedic encyclopedia), Dehaswasthyakkagi Yogasana
- Website: www.malladihalliast.com

Raghavendra Swami of Malladihalli (Kannada: ಮಲ್ಲಾಡಿಹಳ್ಳಿ ಶ್ರೀ ರಾಘವೇಂದ್ರ ಸ್ವಾಮಿ) (1890–1996), popularly known as ತಿರುಕ Tiruka ("beggar"), was the founder of Anatha Sevashrama Trust, Malladihalli. He taught yoga from his base as Malladihalli near Holalkere in Chitradurga district, a village in Karnataka, India.

== Early life ==
Raghavendra Swami, was born on 27 July 1890, in a small village Barkur, in Karnataka. He was their only child. His parents named him Kumaraswamy. Later, urged by the head priest of Mantralaya Mutt, his name was changed to Raghavendra.

He has said that he met Palani Swami, a yogi. He has claimed to have learned hatha yoga, asanas and pranayama from him. He was adopted by Puthali Bai and Narasimhaiah on the advice of Bhirthi Ramachandra Shastry after the death of his mother. Anantha Padmanabha, leaving his son in the care of the foster parents went on a pilgrimage to Himalayas.

He learnt Carnatic music, singing Bhajans and devotional songs. As a school boy he participated and acted in many plays, Yakshagana, and Thala Maddale.

== Later life ==
He met Siddharudha Swami to do social works in Hubli, Karnataka; but left after few days for Tumkur.

Kumaraswamy started his association with K. Shivaram Karanth, a budding artist, who later, acquired the skills of drama, and its intricate styles, at the Amba Prasaditha Nataka Company, in Tumkur. Shivaram Karanth took Raghavendra to Ranganatha Thamankar, who offered him a job as a clerk at his drama company. He was entrusted with the sales of tickets and disbursement of salaries and wages to the staff of the drama company. Later during this period, he left his job.

He has said he learnt from Paramahamsa Yogananda, Swami Shivananda Tirtha and the wrestler Rajaratna Manick Rao. Kumaraswamy learnt various martial arts under the guidance of Manekrao.

He was sent to Lahore to learn under from Lakshman Das, a Yoga and Ayurvedic practitioner.

Jaggi Vasudev was 12 or 13 years of age when he came in contact with Swamiji (who was then about 81 years old) and learned hatha yoga from him. Later on Jaggi Vasudev founded the Isha Foundation and came to be known as Sadhguru by his followers.

== Social works ==
He claimed that he had treated more than 3 million people for various diseases with ayurvedic medicines, and yoga without any surgery. He built an Ayurvedic hospital at Malladihalli and Vishwa Yoga Mandira (World Yoga Trust) and various educational institutions, on a non-profit basis.

== Bibliography ==
He was the author of books on yoga and ayurveda, as well as novels and plays in Kannada published under the pen name of Tiruka.

=== Yogasana ===
- Surya Namaskara (ಸೂರ್ಯ ನಮಸ್ಕಾರ)
- Surya Namaskara (Salutations to the Sun—English)
- Surya Namaskara (pictures, chart)
- Pranayama (ಪ್ರಾಣಾಯಾಮ)
- Pranayama (English)
- Angamardhana (ಅಂಗಮರ್ದನ)
- Dehaswasthyakkagi Yogasanagalu (ದೇಹ ಸ್ವಾಸ್ಥ್ಯಕ್ಕಾಗಿ ಯೋಗಾಸನಗಳು)
- Dehaswasthyakkagi Yogasanagalu (Yogasanas for good health—English)
- Katharoopaka Yogasana (ಕಥಾರೂಪಕ ಯೋಗಾಸನ)
- Shatkarmavidhi (ಶಟ್ಕರ್ಮವಿಧಿ)
- Sarvangasundara Vyayama (Kannada)
- Gurunamaskara (ಗುರುನಮಸ್ಕಾರ)
- Gurunamaskara (English)
- Pranayama for Body and Soul (English) 1988. XIV, 90 S.: Ill

=== Ayurveda ===
- Swayum Vaidhya (Ayurvedic Encyclopedia) (ಸ್ವಯಂ ವೈದ್ಯ)
- Aushadhi Ayurveda Chikitsa Sangraha (ಔಷಧಿ ಆಯುರ್ವೇದ ಚಿಕಿತ್ಸಾ ಸಂಗ್ರಹ)
- Gruha Vaidhya Kaipidi (ಗೃಹ ವೈದ್ಯ ಕೈಪಿಡಿ)
- Vanaushadhigala Gunadharma (ವನೌಷಧಿಗಳ ಗುಣಧರ್ಮ)

=== Kadambari (Novels) ===
- Koneya Gutuku (ಕೊನೆಯ ಗುಟುಕು)
- Mooleya Handara (ಮೂಳೆಯ ಹಂದರ)
- Chiteyo Samaadiyo (ಚಿತೆಯೋ ಸಮಾಧಿಯೋ)
- Udayastha (ಉದಯಾಸ್ಥ)
- Soothrada Bombe (ಸೂತ್ರದ ಬೊಂಬೆ)
- Rasarushi (ರಸಋಷಿ)
- Thyagajeevi (ತ್ಯಾಗಜೀವಿ)
- Changaoli Cheluva (ಚಂಗೋಳಿ ಚೆಲುವ)

=== Plays ===
- Ranachandi (ರಣಚಂಡಿ)
- Mahakavi Bharavi (ಮಹಾಕವಿ ಭಾರವಿ)
- Nyayamantri (ನ್ಯಾಯಮಂತ್ರಿ)
- Usha Swayumvara (ಉಶಾ ಸ್ವಯಂವರ)
- Vanamahotsava (ವನಮಹೋತ್ಸವ)
- Thirunama (ತಿರುನಾಮ)
- Sukhee Raajya (ಸುಖೀ ರಾಜ್ಯ)
- KarmaYogi (ಕರ್ಮ ಯೋಗಿ)
- Uddara (ಉದ್ಧಾರ)
- Bhakta Shabari (ಭಕ್ತ ಶಬರಿ)

=== Other ===
- Joligeya Pavada(ಜೋಳಿಗೆಯ ಪವಾಡ)
- Athma Nivedane (ಆತ್ಮ ನಿವೇದನೆ)
- Bhava Bindu (ಭಾವ ಬಿಂದು)
- Bruhadyoga Darshana (Collections from expert saints) (ಬೃಹದ್ ಯೋಗ ದರ್ಶನ)
- Devaru Yaaru? (ದೇವರು ಯಾರು)
