= Firepro Systems (India) =

Firepro Systems, incorporated in 1992 by N S Narendra as a proprietorship, is an Indian company that provides services for fire protection, security, and building management systems. The company went global early and used to get 25% of its revenues from overseas. In 2008 when the real estate market suffered a setback, FirePro was affected. In 2011 the company ran into a financial crisis and was unable to pay some of its employees. On 11 May 2012, Panasonic announced plans to acquire a 76.2% stake in the Rs. 700 crore Firepro Systems.
