= Anillinus depressus =

Scientific classification
- Kingdom: Animalia
- Phylum: Arthropoda
- Class: Insecta
- Order: Coleoptera
- Suborder: Adephaga
- Family: Carabidae
- Genus: Anillinus
- Species: A. depressus

Binomial name
- Anillinus depressus (Jeannel, 1963)

Species of beetle

Anillinus depressus is a species of ground beetle in the family Carabidae. It is found in North America.
