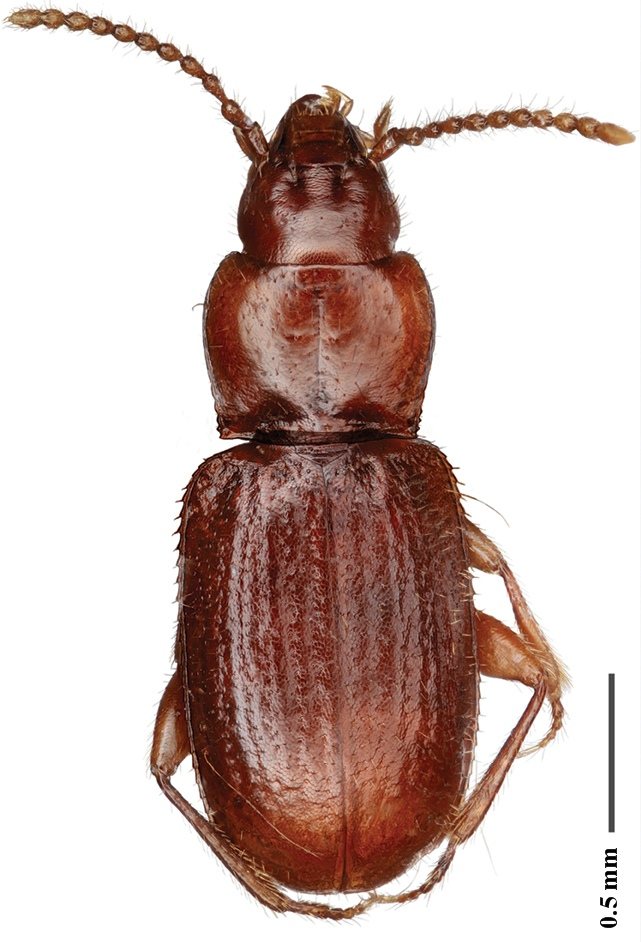
- Anillinus felicianus, Louisiana

Scientific classification
- Kingdom: Animalia
- Phylum: Arthropoda
- Class: Insecta
- Order: Coleoptera
- Suborder: Adephaga
- Family: Carabidae
- Subfamily: Trechinae
- Tribe: Bembidiini
- Genus: Anillinus; Casey, 1918

Synonyms
- Troglanillus Jeannel, 1963

= Anillinus =

Genus of beetles

Anillinus is a genus in the ground beetle family Carabidae. There are more than 60 described species in Anillinus, from the southeastern United States. They range from the east coast as far west as Texas and Oklahoma. Two species, Anillinus magnus and Anillinus minor, have been described from Brazil, although validity of these species has been questioned.

Like other members of the subtribe Anillina, the species of Anillinus are blind, wingless, and small, typically 3 mm long or less. They live in deep forest litters, under rocks or in soil, or in caves as true troglobites.

Anillinus species tend to have extremely localized distributions, with a relatively large number of species in a few states. They have a geologically recent history of lineage diversification. This provides a valuable source of biogeographic information used in modeling evolutionary systems of regional biotas.

The genus Anillinus remains one of the most incompletely known genera of ground beetles in the United States. In just the 20 years from 2003 to 2023, the number of known species of Anillinus increased from 11 to 63 species.

== Species ==
These 65 species belong to the genus Anillinus:

- Anillinus acutipennis Sokolov & Reddell, 2014
- Anillinus affabilis (Brues, 1902)
- Anillinus aleyae Sokolov & Watrous, 2008
- Anillinus alleni Sokolov & Carlton, 2017
- Anillinus balli Sokolov & Carlton, 2004
- Anillinus barberi Jeannel, 1963
- Anillinus barri Sokolov & Carlton, 2004
- Anillinus campbelli Giachino, 2011
- Anillinus carltoni Sokolov, 2011
- Anillinus cavicola Sokolov, 2012
- Anillinus chandleri Sokolov, 2011
- Anillinus cherokee Sokolov & Carlton, 2008
- Anillinus chilhowee Sokolov, 2011
- Anillinus cieglerae Sokolov & Carlton, 2007
- Anillinus clinei Sokolov, 2020
- Anillinus comalensis Sokolov & Reddell, 2014
- Anillinus cornelli Sokolov & Carlton, 2004
- Anillinus daggyi Sokolov & Carlton, 2004
- Anillinus davidsoni Sokolov, 2012
- Anillinus depressus (Jeannel, 1963)
- Anillinus docwatsoni Sokolov & Carlton, 2004
- Anillinus dohrni (Ehlers, 1884)
- Anillinus elongatus Jeannel, 1963
- Anillinus erwini Sokolov & Carlton, 2004
- Anillinus felicianus Sokolov, 2021
- Anillinus folkertsi Sokolov & Carlton, 2004
- Anillinus folkertsioides Sokolov, 2020
- Anillinus forthoodensis Sokolov & Reddell, 2014
- Anillinus fortis (G.Horn, 1869)
- Anillinus gimmeli Sokolov & Carlton, 2010
- Anillinus hildebrandti Sokolov, 2020
- Anillinus hirsutus Sokolov, 2012
- Anillinus humicolus Sokolov, 2020
- Anillinus indianae Jeannel, 1963
- Anillinus inexpectatus Sokolov, 2014
- Anillinus juliae Sokolov & Carlton, 2010
- Anillinus kingi Sokolov, 2012
- Anillinus kovariki Sokolov & Carlton, 2004
- Anillinus langdoni Sokolov & Carlton, 2004
- Anillinus lescheni Sokolov & Carlton, 2004
- Anillinus longiceps Jeannel, 1963
- Anillinus loweae Sokolov & Carlton, 2004
- Anillinus magazinensis Sokolov & Carlton, 2004
- Anillinus magnus Zaballos & Mateu, 1998
- Anillinus merritti Sokolov & Carlton, 2010
- Anillinus minor Zaballos & Mateu, 1998
- Anillinus moseleyae Sokolov & Carlton, 2004
- Anillinus murrayae Sokolov & Carlton, 2004
- Anillinus nantahala Dajoz, 2005
- Anillinus pecki Giachino, 2011
- Anillinus pusillus Sokolov & Carlton, 2007
- Anillinus relictus Sokolov, 2021
- Anillinus robisoni Sokolov & Carlton, 2004
- Anillinus sinuaticollis Jeannel, 1963
- Anillinus sinuatus (Jeannel, 1963)
- Anillinus smokiensis Sokolov, 2011
- Anillinus steevesi Barr, 1995
- Anillinus stephani Sokolov & Carlton, 2004
- Anillinus tishechkini Sokolov & Carlton, 2004
- Anillinus tombarri Sokolov, 2012
- Anillinus turneri Jeannel, 1963
- Anillinus unicoi Sokolov, 2011
- Anillinus valentinei (Jeannel, 1963)
- Anillinus virginiae Jeannel, 1963
- Anillinus wisemanensis Sokolov & Reddell, 2014
