= Anillinus stephani =

Scientific classification
- Domain: Eukaryota
- Kingdom: Animalia
- Phylum: Arthropoda
- Class: Insecta
- Order: Coleoptera
- Suborder: Adephaga
- Family: Carabidae
- Genus: Anillinus
- Species: A. stephani

Binomial name
- Anillinus stephani Sokolov & Carlton, 2004

Species of beetle

Anillinus stephani is a species of ground beetle in the family Carabidae. It is found in North America.
