= Anillinus fortis =

Scientific classification
- Domain: Eukaryota
- Kingdom: Animalia
- Phylum: Arthropoda
- Class: Insecta
- Order: Coleoptera
- Suborder: Adephaga
- Family: Carabidae
- Genus: Anillinus
- Species: A. fortis

Binomial name
- Anillinus fortis (Horn, 1869)

Synonyms
- Anillus fortis Horn, 1869; Anillinus carolinae Casey, 1918

Species of beetle

Anillinus fortis is a species of ground beetle in the family Carabidae. It is endemic to the Eastern United States.
