= List of Asuras =

List of a class of beings in Hinduism

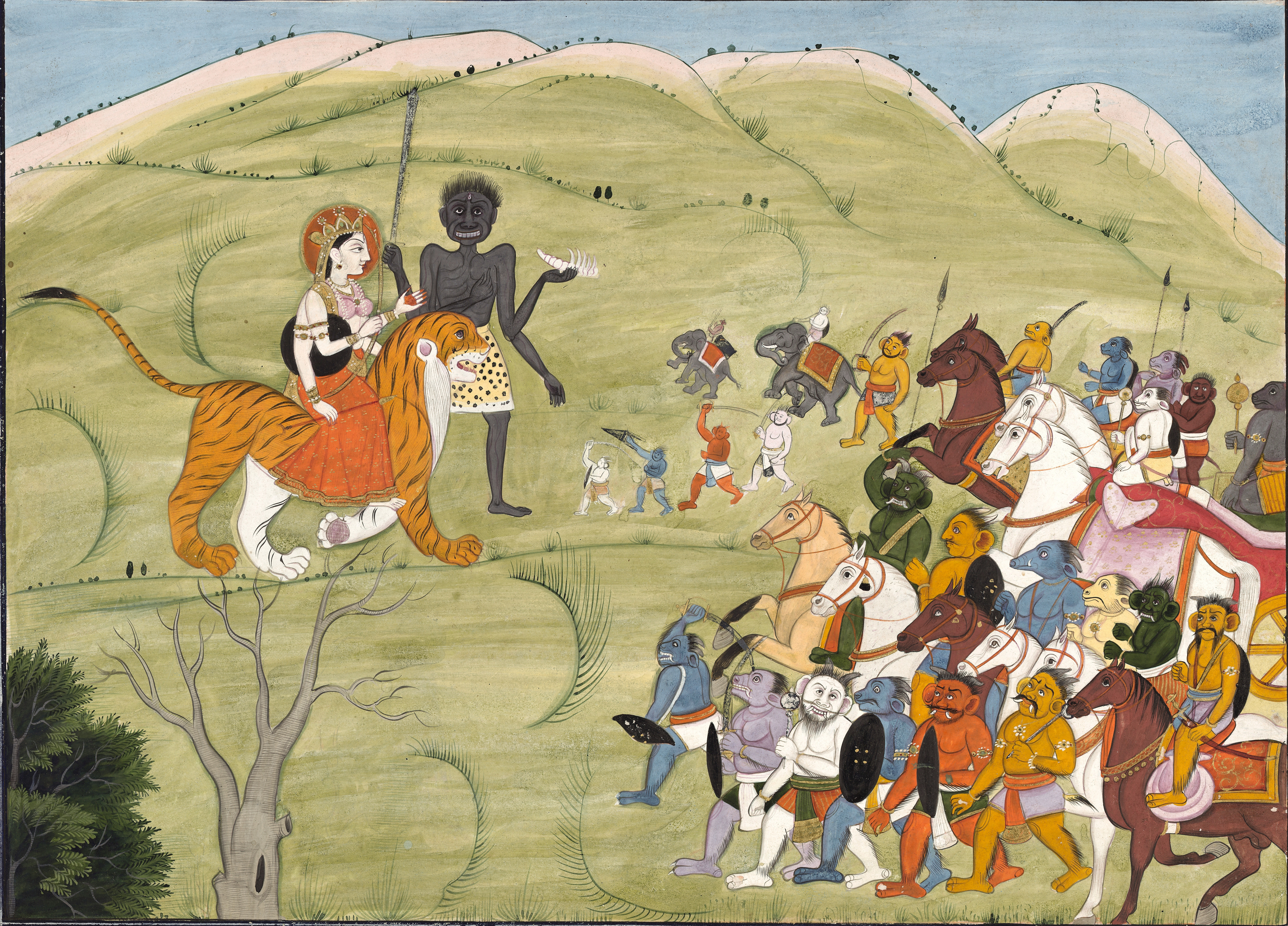
The asuras fight the goddess Kali

Asuras (Sanskrit: असुर) are a class of beings or power-seeking clans, related to the more benevolent devas (also known as suras) in Hinduism.

== Clans ==
The two major clans of the Asuras are the Daityas and the Danavas.

- Daitya - a clan of asuras born from the demonic Diti and Kashyapa.
- Dānava - a clan of asuras born from the primordial sea Danu (Known as Dānaveghasā in Buddhism) and Kashyapa.
- Rakshasa - a class of beings sometimes categorised as synonymous with asuras

== Legend ==
- ॐ - mentioned in Hindu scriptures
- ☸ - mentioned in Buddhist scriptures

== A ==
- Āḍi ॐ
- Aghāsura ॐ
- Ahirāvaṇa - Described as a brother of Rāvaṇa in some versions of the Rāmāyaṇa ॐ
- Akṣayakumāra - Son of Rāvaṇa ॐ
- Alāmbāsa - A powerful asura mentioned in the Hindu epic Mahābhārata ॐ
- Alambuṣa - A powerful asura from the Mahabharata ॐ
- Alāyudha - A powerful asura from the Mahabharata ॐ
- Andhaka ॐ
- Anuhlāda - Son of Hiraṇyakaśipu ॐ
- Apasmāra ॐ☸
- Aśva - Son of Diti ॐ
- Atikāya - Son of Rāvaṇa ॐ
- Āyu - Son of Hiraṇyakaśipu (Harivaṃśa) ॐ

== B ==
- Bhaṇḍāsura - asura slain by Tripura Sundarī ॐ
- Bāṇāsura - warred against Krishna ॐ
- Bhasmāsura ॐ
- Bakāsura - slain by Bhima ॐ
- Bakāsura - slain by Krishna ॐ
- Bali - banished to Pātāla by Vāmana avatāra of Viṣṇu ॐ

== C ==
- Chanda ॐ
- Candravarma ॐ

== D ==
- Danu - Mother of the Danavas ॐ☸
- Darika ॐ
- Dhenuka ॐ
- Diti - Mother of the Daityas ॐ
- Dūṣaṇa ॐ
- Dhumralochana ॐ
- Dhantasura - Son of Gajasura and grandson of Mahishasura

== G ==
- Gajāsura - The name of several asuras who take the form of an elephant ॐ
- Gayāsura ॐ

== H ==
- Hiraṇyakaśipu ॐ
- Hiraṇyākṣa ॐ
- Hlāda - Son of Hiraṇyakaśipu ॐ
- Holikā ॐ

== I ==
- Ilvala - Also referred to as Atapi ॐ
- Indrajit (rakshasa) ॐ

== J ==
- Jālāndhāra ॐ
- Jvārāsura ॐ☸
- Jātāsuraॐ
- Jambasura - Slain by Mahalakshmi ॐ

== K ==
- Kamsa - A powerful king killed by Krishna, referred to as an asura in the Padma Purana ॐ
- Kaiṭabha ॐ
- Kakasura ॐ
- Kāla - Son of Hiraṇyakaśipu (Harivaṃśa) ॐ
- Kali - Ruler of the Kali Yuga ॐ
- Kālanemi ॐ
- Kālayāvana ॐ
- Karambha ॐ
- Karindrāsura ॐ
- Keśī - An asura horse slain by Krishna ॐ
- Ketu - Personification of the descending lunar node ॐ☸卐
- Kābāndhā - A powerful rakshasa from the Ramayana ॐ
- Khara ॐ
- Kolhasura - Slain by Mahalakshmi ॐ
- Kamlasura - Slain by Ganesha ॐ

== M ==
- Mada ॐ
- Madhu ॐ
- Mahābali- An asura king exiled to the underworld by Vamana (an avatar of Vishnu) ॐ☸卐
- Mahiṣāsura ॐ
- Mallanāga ॐ
- Mandodarī ॐ
- Mayāsura - An asura king ॐ
- Meghanāda - Another name of Indrajit ॐ
- Maricha
- Mitra - A former asura also classed among the Devas ॐ
- Mukāsura ॐ
- Munda ॐ
- Murāsura ॐ

== N ==
- Namuci - In Buddhism, an epithet of Māra ॐ☸卐
- Narakāsura ॐ
- Niśumbha ॐ

== P ==
- Pahārāda - An asura king ☸
- Praheti ॐ
- Prahlada - Son of Hiraṇyakaśipu ॐ
- Pralamba ॐ
- Pūtanā ॐ

== R ==
- Rāhu - Personification of the eclipse and an asura king ॐ☸卐
- Raktabīja ॐ
- Rambha ॐ
- Ravana (rakshasa)

== S ==
- Saṁbara ॐ
- Saṁhlāda - Son of Hiraṇyakaśipu ॐ
- Śibi - Son of Hiraṇyakaśipu (Harivaṃśa) ॐ
- Śukra - The 'guru' of the asuras and personification of the planet Venus ॐ
- Somaprabhā - Daughter of Mayāsura ॐ
- Sucitti (Pali) - Present at the teaching of the Mahāsamaya Sutta ☸
- Sugriva (asura) ॐ
- Sujā - Daughter of the asura king Vemacitrin ☸
- Śumbha ॐ
- Sunda ॐ
- Śūrapadmā ॐ
- Svarbhānu ॐ
- Sumālī - Rāvaṇa's grandfather and also a rākṣasa ॐ

== T ==
- Tārakāsura ॐ
- Trinavarta ॐ
- Tripurāsura ॐ
- Triśiras ॐ

== U ==
- Upasunda ॐ
- Ūṣā ॐ

== V ==
- Vātāpi ॐ
- Vemacitrin - An asura king ॐ☸
- Vipracitti - A dānava king ॐ
- Virocana ॐ
- Virūpākṣa ॐ
- Viśvarūpa - Another name for Triśiras ॐ
- Vṛkāsura ॐ
- Vṛṣaparva ॐ
- Vṛṣaśipta ॐ
- Vṛtra - A draconic asura slain by Indra ॐ☸
- Vyomāsura ॐ

== List of asuras slain by Krishna ==
In the Puranas and other texts of Hindu literature, the deity Krishna is attacked by asuras and rakshasas sent by his uncle Kamsa, as well as others he encounters and slays in his legends.

- Putana - A rakshasi who was sent by Kamsa to appear in the form of a beautiful woman to kill baby Krishna by breastfeeding his poison, but who was killed by the deity when he sucked her life force out and was granted liberation.
- Sakaṭāsura - A cart-demon sent by Kamsa to crush a three-month-old Krishna, but was reduced to pieces by the infant with a single kick.
- Trinavarta - A whirl-wind demon who abducted the child Krishna and carried him to the sky, but was choked by the deity and crushed to death against a rock upon his descent.
- Vatsasura - A calf demon who attacked a cattle-herding Krishna in Vrindavana, whose legs were whirled about and hurled to death under a kapittha tree.
- Bakasura - A demon who took form of a fearful heron who attempted to swallow Krishna in Gokulam, but was forced to throw up, upon which Krishna snapped his beak and slew him.
- Aghasura - A demon who took the form of a gigantic black snake who lured Krishna's cowherd friends into his mouth, but was slain when Krishna expanded in size inside him and burst out his form.
- Arishtasura - A bull-demon who charged against Krishna, and met his end when the deity seized his horns and kicked him with his foot.
- Keshi - A horse-demon who dueled against Krishna and attacked him with his hooves, and perished when the deity thrusted his left arm into Keshi's mouth.
- Vyomasura - A sky demon who abducted Krishna's friends inside caves, and was slain when Krishna hurled him against the earth and suffocated him.
- Śaṅkhacūḍa - A jealous asura who abducted several gopis at Vrindavana, slain by Krishna in a fight.
- Cāṇūra - a pugilist asura who served Kamsa, slain by Krishna in a wrestling match.
- Kamsa - The tyrannical ruler of Mathura and uncle of Krishna who was slain to fulfil a prophecy, regarded as an asura by the Padma Purana.
- Pañcajana - A conch-shaped asura slew Krishna's preceptor's son, destroyed by Krishna under the sea.
- Shishupala - the cousin of Krishna, the incarnation of Jaya, previously betrothed to the deity's chief consort Rukmini, beheaded after he insulted Krishna 101 times.
- Dantavakrta - the incarnation of Vijaya slain by Krishna.
- Kalayavana - An asura king who was killed by Krishna by tricking him into waking Muchukunda.
- Narakasura - A powerful asura ruler slain by Krishna, and his wife Satyabhama, with the Sudarshana Chakra.

== See also ==
- Rakshasa
- Daityas
- Danavas
- Rigvedic deities
