= Little Krishna =

Indian animated series

- Genre: Epic, History
- Created by: Reliance BIG Animation Studio and India Heritage Foundation
- Country of origin: India
- Original languages: Hindi; Tamil; English
- No. of episodes: 13

Production
- Running time: 22 minutes

Original release
- Network: Nickelodeon, Discovery Kids, Sun TV, Pogo TV
- Release: 11 May 2009

Little Krishna is an Indian animated television series created by Reliance Entertainment and India Heritage Foundation in 2009. The series is based on Srila Prabhupada’s book - Kṛṣṇa, the Supreme Personality of Godhead, (ISBN 978-0-8921-3333-8) and other source books of information on Krishna. It was originally aired on Nickelodeon and later aired on Discovery Kids in 2014 and Sun TV.

The series is based on the legend of Hindu deity Krishna. It has 13 standalone episodes involving Krishna between the ages of five and nine."This epic project celebrating Krishna’s childhood pastimes in Vrindavan is dedicated to His Divine Grace A.C. Bhaktivedanta Swami Prabhupada, the Founder-Acharya of International Society for Krishna Consciousness (ISKCON)."

== Production ==
Ashish SK, ex CEO of BIG Animation mentioned the series, which has over 300 characters and as many locations, has taken over seven years in the making, and involved an investment of 50 crore rupees.

The series was conceptualised and produced by Reliance BIG Entertainment with a budget of ₹50 crore (equivalent to ₹126 crore or US$13 million in 2023) and co-produced by The India Heritage Foundation which is powered by ISKCON Bangalore. The series is scripted by Jeffery Scott. The production team of Little Krishna consists of Madhu Pandit Dasa and Rajesh Sawhney as Executive Producers, Ashish S K as Producer, Chanchalapathi Dasa, Bhaktilata Devi Dasi and Chamari Devi Dasi handled the and the research, concept and design.

Big Animation made Little Krishna in two formats — 13 standalone episodes of approximately 22 minutes each and three feature films of 80–85 minutes each. The 13-part series was broadcast on Nick in India.

== Episodes ==
No.	Title
1	"The Attack of the Serpent King"
Little Krishna spends his childhood years in Vrindavan, filling the hearts of the inhabitants with pure love for him. Krishna and his cowherd friends spend their days playing in the pastures of Vrindavan and the cool waters of river Yamuna. One day, Kaliya, an enormous serpent with many hoods, rises out of the Yamuna where Krishna and his friends are playing and spews venom furiously, poisoning the river, cows, and calves. The poisonous fumes emanating from the river cause the boys to fall unconscious. Krishna immediately jumps into the river to save them. Kaliya attacks him, coils around him, and dives deep into the water as the villagers watched helplessly.
2	"The Terrible Storm"
The inhabitants of Vrindavan prepare to perform a festival to please Indra so that he will bless them with good rainfall. However, Krishna convinces his father Nanda Maharaj and other villagers that the offering is due to Govardhan Hill as it is the only source of their sustenance. The festival is then held to honour Govardhan Hill. All the villagers joyfully gather their offerings and proceed to perform the yajna. When Indra learns about this, he becomes furious and orders his warriors to inundate Vrindavan with devastating rain. The village is tormented with torrential rainfall for seven days and nights.
3	"The Horror Cave"
Kamsa is restlessly thinking about Krishna, his angel of death. He calls upon one of his demon friends - Aghasura, a huge, terrifying python. Aghasura takes the orders of Kamsa and goes to Vrindavan to kill Krishna. He lays down with his mouth wide open. His body spreads over many miles and his mouth resembles an enormous cave. Krishna's friends, who happily play nearby, are attracted to this new cave. They enter the cave and soon realise that they are trapped. The boys frantically call out to Krishna for help.
4	"The Enchanted Picnic"
Brahma becomes proud, considering himself to be the foremost servitor of Vishnu. Brahma is bewildered by his own power and position, and he refuses to accept that Krishna, living among the simple villagers of Vrindavan, is none other than Vishnu Himself. Brahma decides to play a trick to find out who Krishna really is. He steals Krishna's friends and cows, puts them in dreamland, and visits Vrindavan a year later to see what Krishna does without his friends and cows. The sight leaves Brahma speechless.
5	"Fire and Fury"
After the death of Aghasura, Kamsa sends Pralambasura to get rid of Krishna. By the time Pralambasura reaches Vrindavan, Krishna is playing a game with his friends. Balaram declares the rule of the game – losers will have to carry winners on their shoulders all the way to the riverside and back. Pralambasura disguises himself as a little boy and joins the team while Krishna exits the game to play some mischief on the gopis. As Pralambasura's team loses, each of them carries a boy from the winning team on their shoulders. Krishna's friends go towards the river, but Pralambasura carries Balaram away to a forest nearby. While the boys are enjoying the game, they hear their cows mooing in fear and walk into the forest in search of the cows and are shocked to see a raging forest fire encircle them. They helplessly cry out to Krishna to save them.
6	"Demon in Disguise"
This episode transitions between two stories that depict Krishna's love for the inhabitants of Vrindavan. Kamsa is furious about the death of Pralambasura. He summons another gigantic demon, Vatsasura, to kill Krishna. Vatsasura sets out in search of Krishna and finds him melodiously playing his flute under a tree. He also sees Krishna's friends racing with their calves. Hence, Vatsasura disguises himself as a calf and tries to attack Krishna. The other story is about Bahula, a dear cow of Krishna. While grazing peacefully, Bahula and her friends are attacked by a tiger. She loses her way and walks into the cave of the tiger while trying to escape with her friends. As the ferocious tiger is ready to pounce on Bahula, she pleads him to let her go. Bahula promises the tiger that she would return the following day after feeding her newborn calf. The tiger agrees on the condition that he would make a meal of Bahula along with her calf if she fails to return the next morning.
7	"Deadly Donkey"
Talavana is a guarded forest where the servants of Kamsa prepare and dispatch a special drink made from the 'taal' fruit for their king's pleasure. Even the denizens of heaven crave to taste this nectar. However, Talavana is watched over by a deadly donkey, Dhenukasura, who mercilessly punishes and kills trespassers. One day, while Krishna and his friends are playing, their cows wander into Talavana, attracted by the sweet aroma of the fruits. The boys are forced to enter Talavana to get their cows back. They find their cows relishing the fruits that have fallen on the ground. Krishna and his friends decide to collect fruits for all the residents of Vrindavan before leaving the place. As they pick up the fruits, they come face to face with Dhenukasura, who is seething with anger.
8	"Challenge of the Brute"
Kamsa is enraged when he hears that Dhenukasura was killed by Krishna. At the suggestion of one of his servants, he sends another demon, Aristasura, a fearsome bull, to challenge Krishna. The raging bull dashes across the village, destroying homes and threatening the residents of Vrindavan. When Krishna learns about the disturbance that Aristasura is causing, he immediately appears before the demon, ready to take him on.
9	"Assault of the Lethal Bird"
The lethal bird, Bakasura, is in search of his meal. He swoops down on a few cowherd men and their cows, planning to devour them. However, the bird is interrupted by King Kamsa, who arrives there to meet him. Kamsa promises his friend Baka royal feasts for a lifetime if he succeeds in killing Krishna. Bakasura vows to accomplish the task by sunset and sets out in search of Kamsa's angel of death. He spots Krishna with his friends in Vrindavan, building a bridge across the river with the help of monkeys, and immediately picks up Krishna with his long beak and swallows him. Enraged by Bakasura's actions, the devatas Indra, Brahma, Agni and Shiva attack him with their weapons and try to save Krishna, but they fail to do so.
10	"The Charge of the Monster Horse"
Kamsa is growing impatient after all his demon friends have been killed by Krishna. As his hopes of getting rid of Krishna fade, a monster horse, Keshi, appears before him. He assures Kamsa that he will crush Krishna to death beneath his hooves. Keshi learns that Krishna wears a yellow garment, holds a flute and wears a peacock feather on his head. Meanwhile, Madhumangal disguises himself as Krishna so that he can get some butter from the little gopis. In search of Krishna, Keshi stumbles upon Madhumangal. Mistaking Madhumangal for Krishna, Keshi snorts furiously and gets ready to attack him.
11	"The Mystery of the Vanishing Sheep"
Krishna and his friends are playing the game 'Robber and Police' in the pastures of Vrindavan. Each of them plays a different role. Subala plays the thief, Sridham – the shepherd and Krishna and Balaram – the police. Other cowherd boys play the role of sheep. Subala hides behind the bushes, eagerly waiting for a chance to steal the 'sheep'. But as he tries to trap them, he finds that the 'sheep' are being led by a mysterious boy who has suddenly appeared on the scene.
12	"The Vicious Whirlwind"
The episode revolves around two pastimes of Krishna. Krishna is bound by his mother Yashoda to a grinding mortar with a rope as punishment. However, this does not stop Krishna from continuing his mischief. He crawls around in the garden, dragging the mortar along, until he reaches the Arjuna trees that stand tall in the courtyard of Nanda Maharaj. The mortar gets stuck between the twin trees. Krishna continues to drag the mortar, pulling it harder, causing the gigantic trees to uproot. As the trees come crashing down with a loud thud, something strange takes place. Kamsa is sitting in his palace, occupied in the thoughts of killing Krishna. On the other hand, baby Krishna is busy playing mischievously in Vrindavan. Trnavarta, a demon in the form of a whirlwind, appears before Kamsa and assures him that he would easily shatter Krishna into pieces. Trnavarta then goes to Vrindavan, swiftly picks up Krishna, and flies high up in the sky.
13	"The Witch Trap"
The episode shows different playful activities of Krishna and Balaram. One day, Balaram finds Krishna eating mud and complains to their mother Yashoda. However, Krishna feigns innocence. She tells Krishna to open his mouth so that she can see for herself. The moment Krishna opens his mouth, Yashoda sees something mystical and feels dizzy. Nanda Maharaj helps her recover from the bewildering experience. Later, he tells Yashoda that Krishna is not an ordinary child. He reminds her of two earlier instances involving a fruit seller and Krishna sucking the life out of Putana, a rakshasi who disguises herself as a young, beautiful woman and tries to kill Krishna by breast-feeding him poisoned milk. Both of them agree that their beloved Krishna is a special boy.

== Release ==
Little Krishna was first aired on Nickelodeon for south Asian territory in May 2009. The series received nationwide recognition.

Evergreen Entertainment is the distributor for the series. Their CEO Steve Walsh commented:

The series offers such a fresh look from anything that we have seen to date coming out of India. It has already done phenomenally well since its premiere on NICK India. It is very well written, the animation is great and is in 3-D which adds to its attractiveness.

== Video games ==
Zapak, an Indian mobile video game developer has released several adaptations of the television series including Little Krishna, Little Radha Run, Little Krishna Makhan Masti and Little Krishna MM Tab, and Little Krishna Jungle Run.

== Awards and recognition ==
The Little Krishna Animation Series has won numerous awards including five FICCI Frames Awards and three Golden Cursor Awards.

- Best Animated TV Episode Award - FICCI Best Animated Frames [BAF] 2007
- Best Animated TV Series - FICCI Best Animated Frames [BAF] 2008
- Outstanding Indian Animated Content- FICCI Best Animated Frames [BAF] 2008
- Best Animated TV Episode Award - FICCI Best Animated Frames [BAF] 2008
- Best VFX in TV Episode Award - FICCI Best Animated Frames [BAF] 2008
- Best 3D Animation Film- Golden Cursor Award 2008
- Best Animation- Asian Television Awards – 2009
- ASIFA Awards of Excellence 2009

== See also ==
- List of Indian animated television series
- List of Indian animated films
