= Gopala-Krishna =

Cow-protector form of Hindu deity Krishna

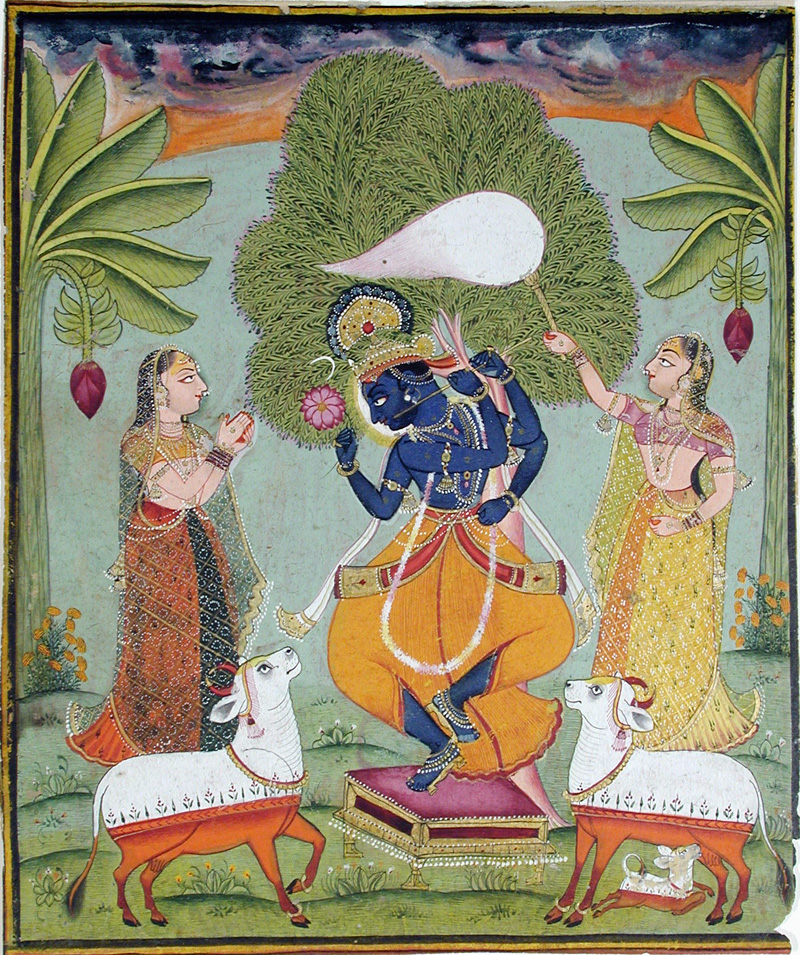
Painting of Krishna dancing atop a stool, attended by two gopis. ca. 1760.

Gopala Krishna (Sanskrit: गोपालकृष्ण, romanized: Gopālakṛṣṇa, lit. 'cow-protector Krishna') refers to a form of the Hindu deity Krishna, as featured in the Harivamsha and the Puranas. The narratives of Gopala Krishna are set in the cowherd settlement of the Vraja region called Gokulam, where he is raised by his foster-parents, Nanda and Yashoda.

Historically one of the earliest forms of worship in Krishnaism, it is believed to be a key element of the early history of the worship of Krishna. This tradition is considered separate from the associated traditions of Bala Krishna and Radha Krishna, that led to amalgamation under Bhagavatism at a later stage of historical development.

== Literature ==
The Bhagavata Purana, as well as the Harivamsha, a text that supplements the Mahabharata, are the primary sources that describe the legend of Gopala Krishna. The tenth book of the Bhagavata Purana, called the Krishna-charita, offers details regarding the childhood of Krishna as the foster-son of Nanda and Yashoda, his life of a cowherd in Vraja, his defeat of the malicious Putana and Kaliya, and his relationship with the women of the region. Indologist Wendy Doniger states that the Harivamsha, composed two centuries after the Mahabharata, integrates the mythologies of the powerful deity and prince who appears in the latter epic, with the folk and vernacular stories of Krishna as a cowherd child. Thus, she believes that his narrative is composed as God pretending to be a prince, who is pretending to be a cowherd.

== Legend ==
In this form, Krishna is represented as a divine cowherd, engaged in the playing of his flute, enrapturing the minds of the milkmaids of Vraja, called the gopis. He is described to be a frolicking youth, and a prankster who amuses himself in his mischief. As a disobedient child, he steals butter from the houses of the gopis, untethers cows, and lies to his foster-mother, Yashoda. Despite all of these antics, the women of Gokulam find him to be too endearing to punish him. Among the most popular portrayals of Gopala Krishna and the gopis is the rāsalīlā, in which Krishna multiplies in form and dances with each gopi who encircles him in the forest. This is variously interpreted to be both a dalliance, as well as a performance of spiritual love between Krishna and his devotees. Later traditions depict Krishna with primarily one gopi-consort called Radha, and later texts such as the Brahma Vaivarta Purana portray Radha to be the chief of the gopis, and Krishna's primary partner during this stage of his life.

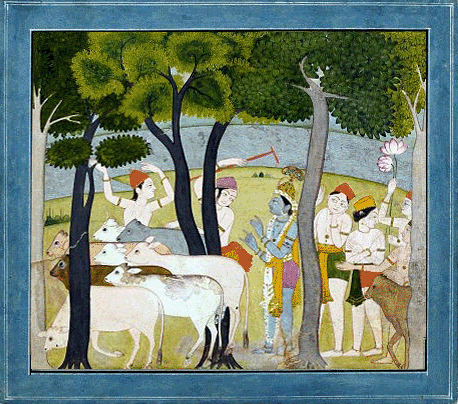
Krishna and the cowherds.

In the Bhagavata Purana, Krishna is presented with his close friends who are also cowherds, called the gopas, who joke and have mock fights with the deity. With these cowherd-boys of Vraja, the deity engages in his boyhood adventures. While he tends to the cows and allows them to graze for pastures, he is attacked by a number of asuras, assigned with the task of slaying him by his tyrannical uncle, Kamsa. Krishna employs both brute strength and his cunning to defeat Bakasura, Vyomasura, Aghasura, and several other asuras.

Most of the tales of Gopala Krishna are traditionally offered allegorical interpretations. One legend depicts Krishna stealing the clothes of the bathing gopis, placed on the riverbank. He climbs a nearby tree, taking the clothes with him. He refuses to return the clothes to the women until they personally walk to the foot of the tree, in the nude. This is most often interpreted to mean that humans are incapable of hiding anything from God, and that the contents of their souls are as good as naked. Another legend features Krishna asking the people of Gokulam to not offer veneration to the Vedic deity of Indra. Furious that his customary veneration had been denied to him, the deity unleashed a torrential downpour upon the land. Krishna is described to have lifted the massive mountain called Govardhana to protect the people.

== See also ==
=== Related names ===
- Achyuta
- Gopinath
- Govinda
- Keshava
- Madhava
- Radha Ramana
- Vāsudeva

=== Related traditions ===
- Bala Krishna
- Vasudeva Krishna
- Radha Krishna
