= Rukminisha Vijaya =

Sanskrit Vaishnava poem

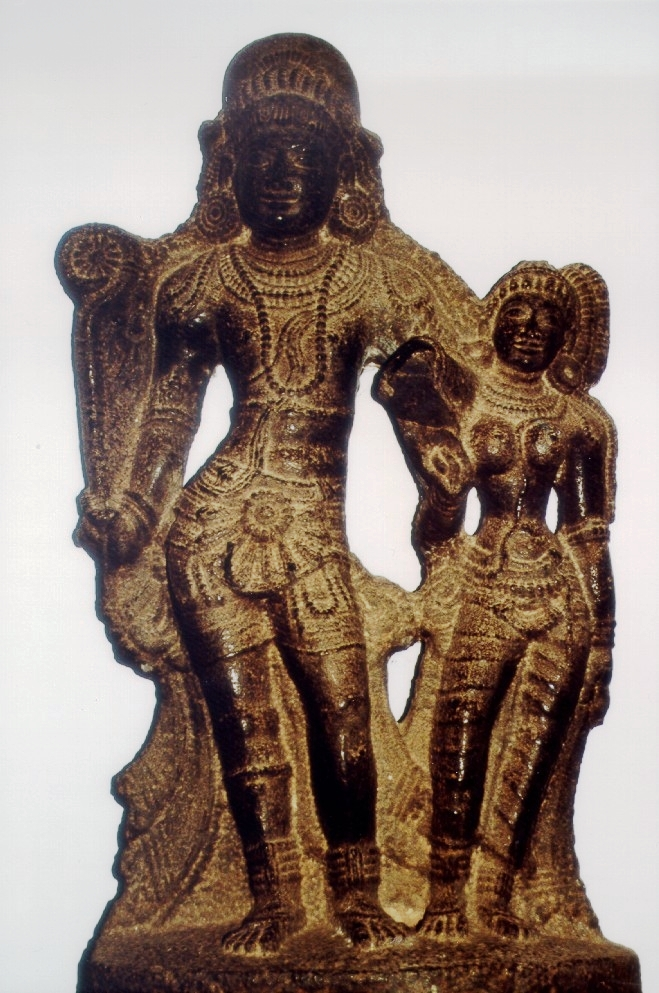
- Krishna and Rukmini, the titular characters of this poem

Information
- Religion: Hinduism
- Author: Vadiraja Tirtha
- Language: Sanskrit
- Period: 16th century
- Chapters: 19
- Verses: 1,241

Rukminisha Vijaya (Sanskrit: रुक्मिणीशविजय, romanized: Rukmiṇīśavijaya, lit. 'The triumph of the lord of Rukmini'), is a Vaishnava work composed by the 16th-century Hindu, Madhva saint, Vadiraja Tirtha. It is an important work of Sanskrit literature, containing 19 chapters and 1,241 verses in various metres. The text is written in the Vaidarbhi style.

Rukminisha Vijaya is a mahakavya, rendered in the kāvya style, narrating the life of Krishna from boyhood, and ending with his marriage with Rukmini, his chief consort. The book highlights the story of Krishna, as described in the 10th canto of the Bhagavata Purana.

== Analysis ==
The Rukminisha Vijaya is noted as an exemplar of Dvaita philosophy, and its opposition of the Advaita doctrine. It describes the exploits of Krishna, whose "unquestioned supremacy" is represented by the saint Vadiraja.

Quoting on the style of the work, Indologist B. N. Krishnamurti Sharma writes, "The descriptions are effective and natural. The style is deeply alliterative. Sense and sound match well and the imagery is fine and lofty".

== Contents ==
The work begins with the compilation of a number of stotras, including ones dedicated to Krishna, who is referred to as the Paramatma, Hayagriva, Rukmini, who is described as Krishna's supreme beloved consort, and Bhudevi.

The narrative form of the work begins with the slokas that describe the legend of Brahma praying to Vishnu for incarnating on earth as Krishna, and goes on to explain the story of Krishna, detailing his birth, his eulogies, the births of Balarama and Durga (Yogamaya), with the first canto ending with the departure of Krishna to Gokulam.

The second canto entails slokas that begin with Krishna's entry into Gokulam, the blessings of Durga upon his parents, the reasons Krishna was born in a cowherd family, and the killing of Putana and Sakatasura, and their achievement of moksha. The third canto begins with the description of the slaying of Trinavarta, Yashoda's witnessing of Krishna's vishvarupa, the symbolic nature of Krishna's activities, the dalliances of Krishna and the milkmaids, the exaltations of his divine abilities, and ends with the subjugation of Kaliya. The fourth canto begins with Krishna's drinking of the forest fire, the slaying of Dhenukasura and other asuras, a description of various seasons, Krishna's mischief of stealing the milkmaids's clothes, and ends with Krishna lifting the mountain Govardhana.

The next few cantos describe the aftermath of the deity's love-sport (Rāsakrīḍā) with the milkmaids, including his slaying of Shankacuda, Aristasura, and Keshi, Krishna's journey to Mathura, the slaying of his uncle Kamsa, his triumph over Jarasandha, his elopement and wedding with Rukmini, and descriptions of the beauty of the divine couple. The birth and exploits of their son, Pradyumna, and his son, Aniruddha, are described, and the work ends with the author seeking the blessings of Krishna.

== Translations ==
The text has been translated into Kannada, Telugu, Tamil, Tulu, Marathi, Hindi and English languages.

== See also ==
- Yadavabhyudaya
- Gopalavimshati
- Hamsa Sandesha
