= Krishna Aur Kans =

- Movies release poster
- Directed by: Vikram Veturi
- Screenplay by: Kamlesh Pandey
- Story by: Vikram Veturi Kamlesh Pandey; Bhaskar Mani
- Produced by: Sk Ashish; Ravi Mahapatro; Vikas Verma; Anand Pandey
- Starring: Om Puri; Juhi Chawla; Prachi Save Manoj Bajpayee; Harish Bhimani; Neetu Chaudhary; Meghana Erande; Ninad Kamat; Jameel Khan; Sudhir Pandey; Uday Sabnis
- Edited by: Varaprasad J.V.
- Music by: Songs: Shantanu Moitra; Background Score: George Joseph; Shantanu Moitra
- Production company: Reliance Animation
- Distributed by: Reliance Entertainment
- Release date: 3 August 2012
- Running time: 123 minutes
- Country: India
- Languages: Hindi; Tamil; Telugu; English
- Budget: ₹0.50 crore
- Box office: ₹0.98 crore

Krishna Aur Kans (transl. Krishna and Kansa) is a 2012 Indian Hindi-language animated epic mythological film produced and distributed by Reliance Entertainment. It was directed by Vikram Veturi. The film is based on ISKCON Founder Srila Prabhupada’s book "Krishna: The Supreme Personality of Godhead", which is based on the ancient text Srimad-Bhagavatam. It was tax free in six states at the time of his release and released in Languages: Hindi, Tamil, Telugu, and English. A new mobile game was also launched on the occasion of Janmashtami after being inspired from film. It was the widest ever released animation film in India. Despite receiving praise for its animation quality and the voice work, it underperformed at the box office.

== Plot ==
The demon king named Emperor Kans reigns as a tyrant over the Kingdom of Mathura and aims to conquer the world. To put an end to his bloodthirsty reign, the gods decide to incarnate on Earth Vishnu, who is born in the form of Krishna, son of Devaki, the sister of Kans. The baby, nephew of the tyrant, is born in the village of Vrindavan, where he is adopted by the village chief, Nanda, who raises him in the same way as his own slightly older son, Balram. Krishna grows up in a good mood and becomes a mischievous little boy, who makes his mother see all the colors and is always ready to play a trick on the Gopi, the cowherds who watch over him. But he distinguished himself very early on by his miraculous exploits, and the music of his flute charmed men and beasts. Krishna especially befriends a little girl of his age, Radha (his eternal love in Hindu mythology), and befriends several boys, including Madhumangal. He can also count on the help of the monkey Dadhiloba and the lamb Hamsi. Krishna must soon come to the aid of the people of the kingdom and face the supernatural perils sent to him by Kans, mainly the demons Trinavat, Bakasur and Pootna. But, seeing Krishna easily defeating each of his envoys, Kans ends up challenging him to a duel in the coliseum of his capital, resulting in the latter killing him and releasing his parents from the dungeon. Several songs punctuate the film.

== Voice cast ==
Original Hindi version:

- Prachi Save Saathi as Krishna / Govardhana
  - Meghana Erande as Baby Krishna
- Om Puri as Kansa
- Sonia Nair as Balarama
- Manoj Bajpayee as Nandarai
- Juhi Chawla as Yashoda
- Supriya Pilgaonkar as Devaki
- Sachin Pilgaonkar as Vasudeva
- Mukesh Khanna as Akroora
  - Mukesh Khanna also voices the narrator in the film
- Anupam Kher as Gargacharya
- Ninad Kamat as Narada
- A. K. Hangal as King Ugrasena
- Malak Shah as Madhumangala
- Neetu Chaudhary as Subala
- Rajshrie Nath as Radha
- Sudhir Pandey as Chanura
- Uday Sabnis as Mushtika
- Ayesha Raza as Chandrika
- Namrata Sawhney as Goddess Durga (Goddess Yogamaya in disguise)
- Sulakshana Khatri as Putana
- Rahul Mulani as Indra
- Harish Bhimani as Lord Vishnu
  - Harish Bhimani also voices the Booming Voice
- Rahul Mulani as Kaliya
- Rajshrie Nath as Lalita
- Anushree Nath as Vishakha
- Jameel Khan as Mahout / A guard
- Vishwanath as Old Man
- Ayesha Raza as Prabhavati
- Vinod Kulkarni as Trinavarta
  - Vinod Kulkarni also voices the other Animals & Miscs
- Kenneth Desai as Vrishbhana

== Reception ==
Akanksha Naval Shetye of DNA said, "The film is more of an engaging fare for children, but even the adults accompanying their kids will find themselves enjoying the film just as much, so go for it!".

== Music ==
The music of the film was composed by Shantanu Moitra, and the lyrics were penned by Swanand Kirkire and Vedavyasa Rangabhattacharya.

#	Title	Singer(s)
1	"Advent of Krishna" (Ayega Koi Ayega)	Sonu Nigam, Hamsika Iyer, Swanand Kirkire, Amitabh Bhattacharya
2	"Enchanting Flute"	Raj Mohan Sinha, Rakesh Chaurasiya
3	"Hey Krishna" (Hey Krishna Hey Krishna)	Sonu Nigam
4	"Holi" (Holi Hain)	Amitabh Bhattacharya, Abhijeet Ghoshal, Hamsika Iyer
5	"Krishna Leaving Vrindavan" (Suno Suno Sawaren Ki)	Shreya Ghoshal, Pranab Kumar
6	"Krishna Past Time" (Gokul Ki Galiyon Me)	Shravan Suresh
7	"Natkhat Natkhat"	Shravan Suresh, Swanand Kirkire
8	"Nukkad Wale"	Shravan Suresh
9	"Putana" (Baccho Jara Dur Dur Rahena Re)	Sunidhi Chauhan, Shantanu Moitra
10	"Rasa" (Roon Ghoona Re)	Shreya Ghoshal, Babul Supriyo
11	"Shloka"	Varaprasad

== Game ==
Zapak, an Indian mobile video game developer has released a game adaptation of the film, titled Krishna aur Kans.

== Awards and nominations ==
Award	Category	Recipients and nominees	Result	Ref.
5th Mirchi Music Awards	Raag-Inspired Song of the Year	"Krishna Leaving Vrindavan (Suno Suno Saanwre Ki...)"	Nominated	

== See also ==
- List of Indian animated feature films
- The Prince of Egypt
