= Keev =

Name of Krishna from the Hindu tradition

Keev is a regional name of Krishna from the Hindu tradition, literally meaning, "prankster". The name appears in the 108 names of Krishna in Gaudiya Vaishnavism.

== Scriptural references ==
=== Gaudiya Vaishnavism ===
According to Chaitanya Mahaprabhu’s commentary on the Gaudiya Vaishnavism, "Keev" has the following meanings:

- One who is mischievous
- The prodigious son
- entity that takes after Krishna, “Krishna-Jeev”

== See also ==
- Balakrishna
- Balagopala
- Keshava
