= Divine Child =

Divine Child may refer to:

- Bala Krishna
- Christ Child
