= Pralamba =

Asura slain by Balarama

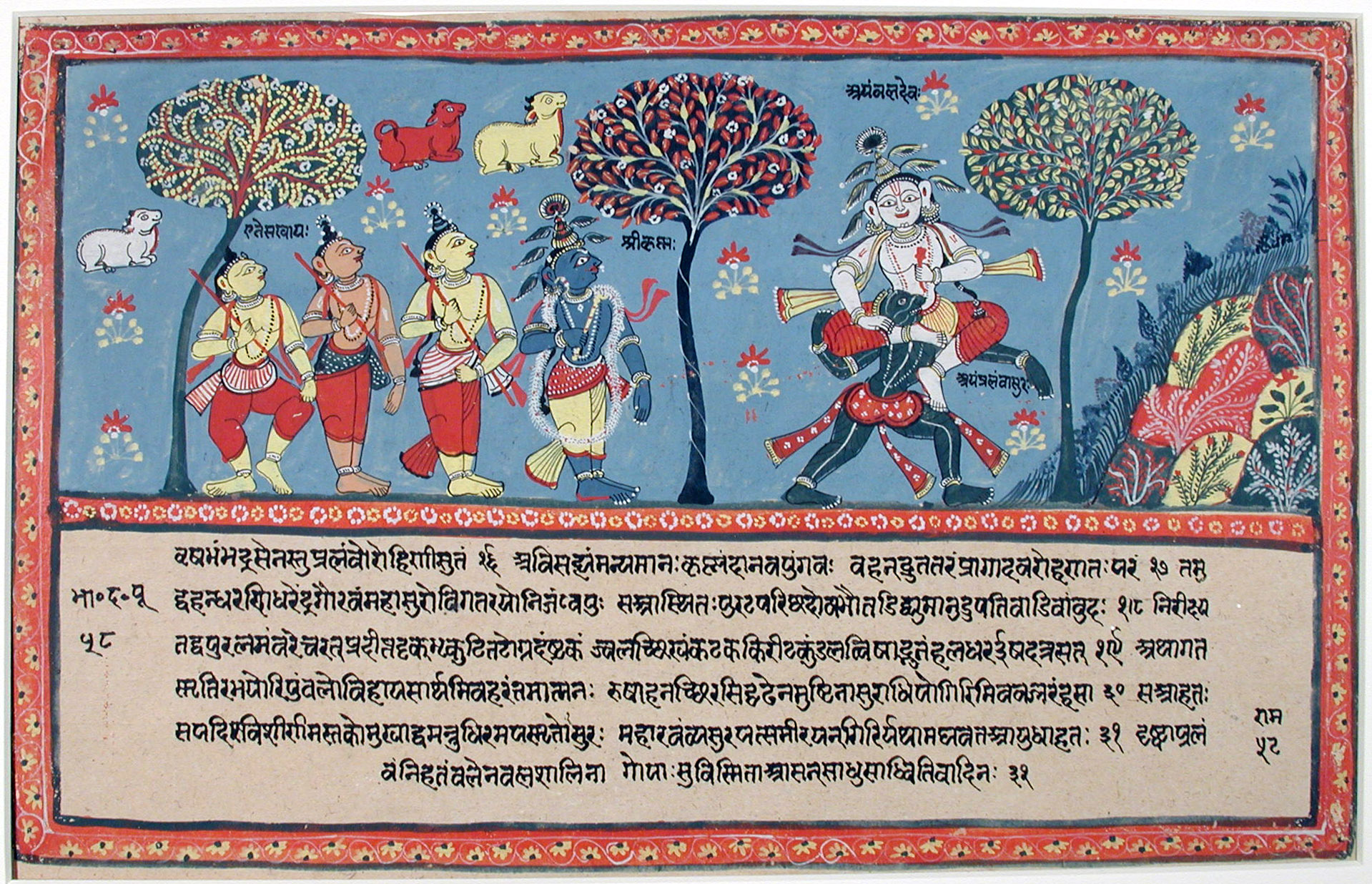
- Balaram vanquishes Pralamba (right)
- Texts: Mahabharata, Puranas

Information
- Affiliation: Asura

Pralamba is an asura killed by Balarama in Hindu mythology. According to the pertinent legend, the asura assumed the guise of a cowherd and attempted to join Krishna and Balarama in a game of jumping, whose conditions dictated that the loser carry the victor on his back. Pralamba promptly lost, and was forced to carry Balarama on his back. However, Pralamba then transformed himself into a larger form and tried to run off with Balarama still clinging to him, which would have happened had Krishna not stopped him with a speech reprimanding him and asking him to suspend his powers. Balarama then clung to Pralamba, squeezing him with his knees, striking him simultaneously on the head and face with his fists, assaulting both his eyes. The asura, vomiting blood from his mouth, and having his brain bashed through the skull, descended to the earth and was slain. References to Pralamba are available in the Vishnu Purana and the Mahabharata.

== In Literature ==
The Vishnu Purana describes the prowess of the asura, slain after the defeat of the asura Dhenuka:

It being Pralamba's duty to carry Saṅkarshana, the latter mounted upon his shoulders, like the moon riding above a dark cloud; and the demon ran off with him, but did not stop: finding himself, however, unable to bear the weight of Balarāma, he enlarged his bulk, and looked like a black cloud in the rainy season, Balarāma beholding him like a scorched mountain, his head crowned with a diadem, and his neck hung round with garlands, having eyes as large as cart wheels, a fearful form, and shaking the earth with his tread, called out, as he was carried away, to his brother, “Kṛṣṇa, Kṛṣṇa, I am carried off by some demon, disguised as a cowherd, and huge as a mountain! What shall I do? Tell me, Madhusūdana: the villain runs away with speed!”

— Vishnu Purana, Chapter 9

== See also ==
- List of Asuras
- Keshi
- Dhenuka
