= Vadiraja Tirtha =

Hindu guru

Śrī Bhavi Sameera Shri Vadiraja Tirtha
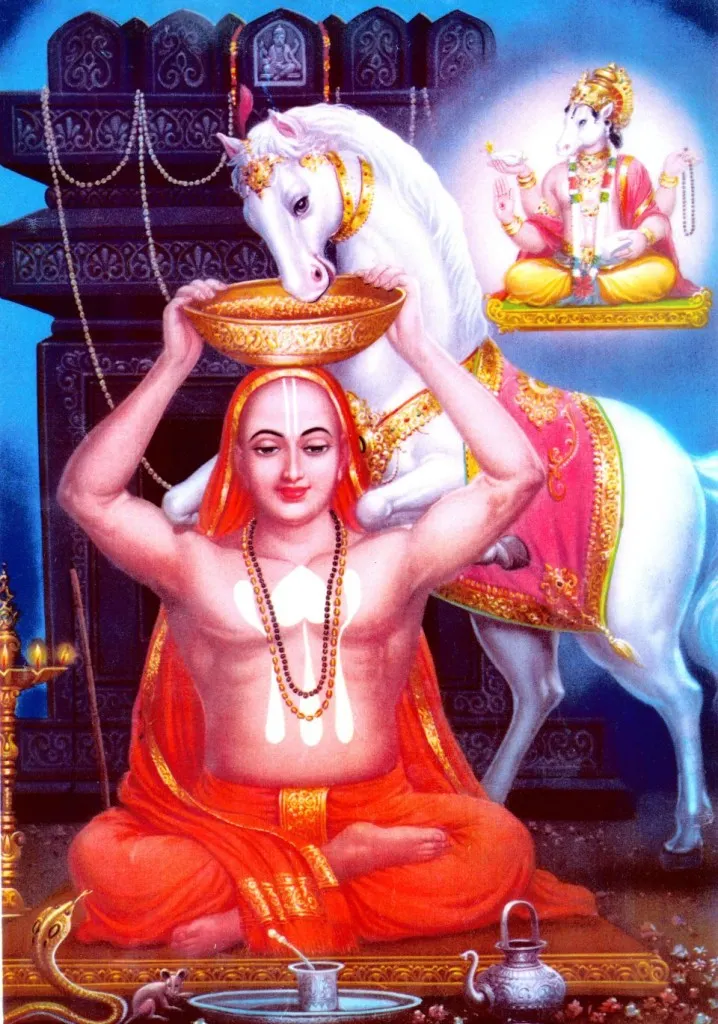
- Image of Sri Vadiraja Tirtha, with Lord Hayagreeva

Personal life
- Born: Bhūvarāha; 1480 Huvinakere in present day Kundapura Taluk of Udupi district, Karnataka
- Died: 1600 (aged 119–120) Sodhe Sirsi in present day Uttara Kannada district, Karnataka
- Notable work(s): Yuktimallika,Rukminisha Vijaya, "SwapnaVrundanakhyana"

Religious life
- Religion: Hinduism
- Philosophy: Dvaita

Religious career
- Teacher: Vagisha Tirtha

Sri Vadiraja Tirtha (IAST: Śrī Vādirāja Tīrtha; c.1480 – c.1600) was a Dvaita philosopher, poet, traveller and mystic. He authored many works, often critical, on Madhva theology and metaphysics. Additionally, he composed numerous poems and as the pontiff of Sodhe Mutt, renovated the temple complex at Udupi and established the Paryaya system of worship. He also enriched the Kannada literature of the time by translating Madhvacharya's works to Kannada, giving impetus and contributing to the Haridasa movement. He has influenced both Carnatic and Hindustani music through his compositions. His compositions are mainly in Kannada and Sanskrit. His mudra is 'Hayavadana'. His works are characterised by their poetic flourishes, wit and humour. (Note: Madhva community who are followers of Sodhe Matha believes him to be an incarnation of Latavya, a deity supposed to assume the position of Vayu in the next kalpa but other Madhvas doesn't accept this.)

== Life ==
Vadirajaru was born as Bhuvaraha in Huvinakere, a village in the Kundapura taluk. He was ordained as a monk at the age of 8 and placed into the care of Vidyanidhi Tirtha and later Vagisha Tirtha, who oversaw his education. Works of contemporary Haridasas and oral traditions point to Vadirajaru being a student of Vyasatirtha along with Vijayendra Tirtha though he never acknowledged Vyasatirtha as his mentor in his works. He eventually assumed the pontifical seat of the mutt at Sodhe, succeeding Vagisha Tirtha. Vadiraja seems to have wielded some influence in the court of the Nayakas of Keladi as Vadiraja's successor, Vedavedya Tirtha, received grants of villages from Keladi Venkatappa Nayak. In 1512, Vadiraja began his tour of the pilgrimages in India lasting for two decades, the details of which he recorded in his travelogue entitled Tirtha Prabanda. A number of miracles have been ascribed to him during these journeys such as resurrection of the dead and exorcism of demons. Traditional accounts also speak of his expertise in occult and of an incident involving the taming of a forest spirit called Annappa or Bhutaraja. Vadiraja is known to have debated the Jain scholars at Moodabidri and Karkala and converted a sect of goldsmith community to the Dvaita fold. They are identified as Daivajnyas. It was around the same time that he restructured the organisation of the temple at Udupi, established the Ashta Mathas around the temple and renovated the temple itself. The religious reforms initiated by him survive to this day. A life of 120 years is ascribed to him. Though the veracity of this claim may be questioned, Sharma notes "there is no doubt he (Vadiraja) enjoyed a long life presiding over the mutt at Sodhe, established by him, for a number of years". His mortal remains (Brindavana) are enshrined at Sodhe.

== Legacy ==
Vadiraja contributed to Dasa Sahitya, writing several poems under the ankita naama Hayavadana. Yuktimalika is considered to be his work of importance. Sharma notes "The work is brimming with freshness and originality of approach and ideas". He also composed several poems, notable of which is an epic poem of 19 cantos titled Rukminisha Vijaya.

== Notable works ==
Vadiraja is credited with more than sixty works. His body of work is diverse, ranging from short hymns and epic poems to scholarly works on the metaphysical intricacies of Dvaita. Many of his independent works are critical directed not only at Advaita but heterodox schools like Buddhism and especially Jainism which flourished in the South Canara region in the 16th century.

=== List of scholarly works ===
Name	Description	References
Upanyasaratnamala	Collective title given to the commentary on the trilogy of refutations by Madhva (Upadhi Khandana,Mayavada Khandana,Mithyatva Anumana Khandana)	
Tattva Prakasika Guruvartha Dipika	Commentary on the Tattva Prakasika of Jayatirtha	
Nyaya Sudha Guruvartha Dipika	Commentary on the Nyaya Sudha of Jayatirtha	
Ekona-Panchapadika	A non-extant polemical treatise criticising the Panchapadika of Padmapadacharya	
Vivaranavranam	A polemical treatise criticising the Vivarana by Prakashatman of the Vivarana school of Advaita	
Pasandakhandanam	A polemical treatise directed against the tenets of Buddhism and Jainism	
Yuktimalika	An independent treatise arguing for the logical supremacy of Dvaita over other schools of thought	
Nyayaratnavali	An epigrammatical critique of the Advaita doctrines	
Madhvavagvajravali	A non-extant work possibly containing arguments against Advaita	
Kalpalata	A work dealing with the epistemology of Dvaita	
Lakshalankara	Commentary on the Mahabharata Tatparya Nirnaya of Madhva	

=== List of literary works ===
Name	Description	References
Rukminisha Vijaya	A poetic rendition of the Rukmini Haran Leela of Rukmini and Krishna	
Tirtha Prabanda	A travelogue detailing the pilgrimages undertaken by Vadiraja	
Bhugola Varnanam	An interpretation of Hindu cosmology according to Dvaita	
Lakshmi Shobhana	A poem about the marriage of Lakshmi and Narayana	

== Bibliography ==
- Sharma, B.N.K (2000) [1961]. History of Dvaita school of Vedanta and its Literature. Vol. 2 (3rd ed.). Bombay: Motilal Banarasidass. ISBN 81-208-1575-0.
- Betty, L. Stafford (1978). Vadiraja's Refutation of Sankara's Non-dualism: Clearing the Way for Theism. Motilal Banarasidass. ISBN 978-8120831582.
- Dalal, Roshen (2010). "Vadirajatirtha". Hinduism: An Alphabetical Guide. Penguin Books India. ISBN 978-0143414216.
- Rao, Vasudeva (2002). Living Traditions in Contemporary Contexts: The Madhva Matha of Udupi. Orient Blackswan. ISBN 9788125022978.
- Zydenbos, Robert (1994). According to Tradition: Hagiographical Writing in India. Otto Harrassowitz Verlag. ISBN 9783447035248.
- Pandurangi, K.T (1992). Essentials of Yuktimallika. University of Michigan.
- Murthy, Badarayana (2008). Bhugola Varnanam. University of Virginia.
