= Ilvala and Vatapi =

Asura brothers in Hindu mythology

Ilvala (Sanskrit: इल्वल, romanized: Ilvala) and Vatapi (Sanskrit: वातापि, romanized: Vātāpi) are asura brothers in Hindu mythology. They are featured in the Mahabharata, in which their murderous scheme is ended by the sage Agastya.

== Legend ==
In the Mahabharata, the sage Lomasha narrates the legend of the daityas called Ilvala and Vatapi to the prince Yudhishthira. The elder of the brothers, Ilvala, is stated to have once begged a Brahmin hermit to grant him a son equal to that of the deity Indra. When the Brahmin refused this request, Ilvala grew angry with him. He turned Vatapi into a lamb or a goat, cooked his meat, and served him to the Brahmin. After the Brahmin had completed his meal, Ilvala called out to his brother by name, who promptly emerged from within the Brahmin's side, murdering him. Ilvala performed this deed on multiple occasions with the Brahmins he encountered. The brothers engaged in the same scheme when they came across the sage Agastya. When Ilvala summoned Vatapi after being swallowed by the sage, the latter informed him that his brother had been digested by him. When the terrified asura asked Agastya how he could serve him, Agastya asked for ten thousand cows and pieces of gold, and a golden chariot yoked by two steeds.

In the Ramayana, Ilvala is stated to have attacked Agastya after his brother's death, after which he was also slain by the sage's glance.

The Bhagavata Purana mentions that Ilvala had a son named Balavala, who used to disturb the sages present at Naimisha forest as they listened to the narration of various Puranas from Ugrashravas. He is slain by the deity Balarama during his pilgrimage.
