= Aghasura =

Demon in Hindu scriptures

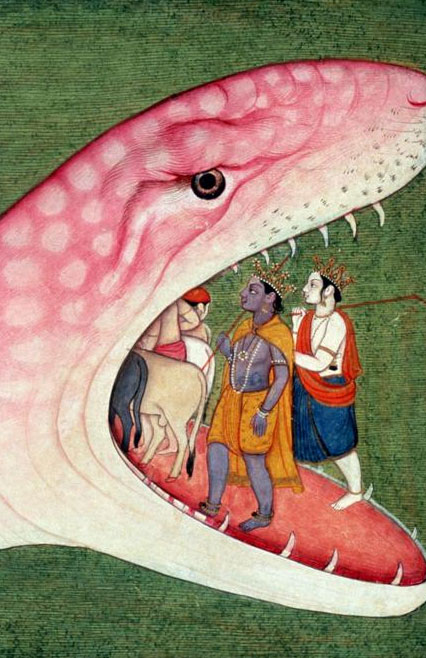
Krishna enters the mouth of Aghasura

Aghasura (Sanskrit: अघासुर) is an asura featured in Hindu literature, most notably in the Bhagavata Purana. He was one of Kansa's generals, and the elder brother of the demoness Putana and Bakasura.

Agha is stated to be as one of the tribes that was in alliance with Kamsa. The killing of Aghasura by Krishna is narrated by the sage Shuka to King Parikshit in the Bhagavata Purana.

== History ==
King Kamsa made many attempts on the life of Krishna, all of them failing. He then sent Aghasura to kill Krishna, a deed which Aghasura willingly attempted to carry out, knowing that his younger siblings Putana and Bakasura were killed by Krishna. He assumed the form of the 8-mile-long serpent, disguising his open mouth against a mountain. All the cowherd boys entered the mouth of the demon, mistaking it to be a cavern. When the serpent closed his mouth, the victims generally suffocated to death.

Krishna entered the serpent upon his arrival and then increased the size of his own body. In response, the demon also extended his own body's size, but started suffocating as Krishna was expanding more quickly than him, causing his eyes to pop out. The demon's life force, however, could not pass through any outlet, and therefore burst out through a hole in the top of Agasura's head, meeting his end in Krishna's hand.

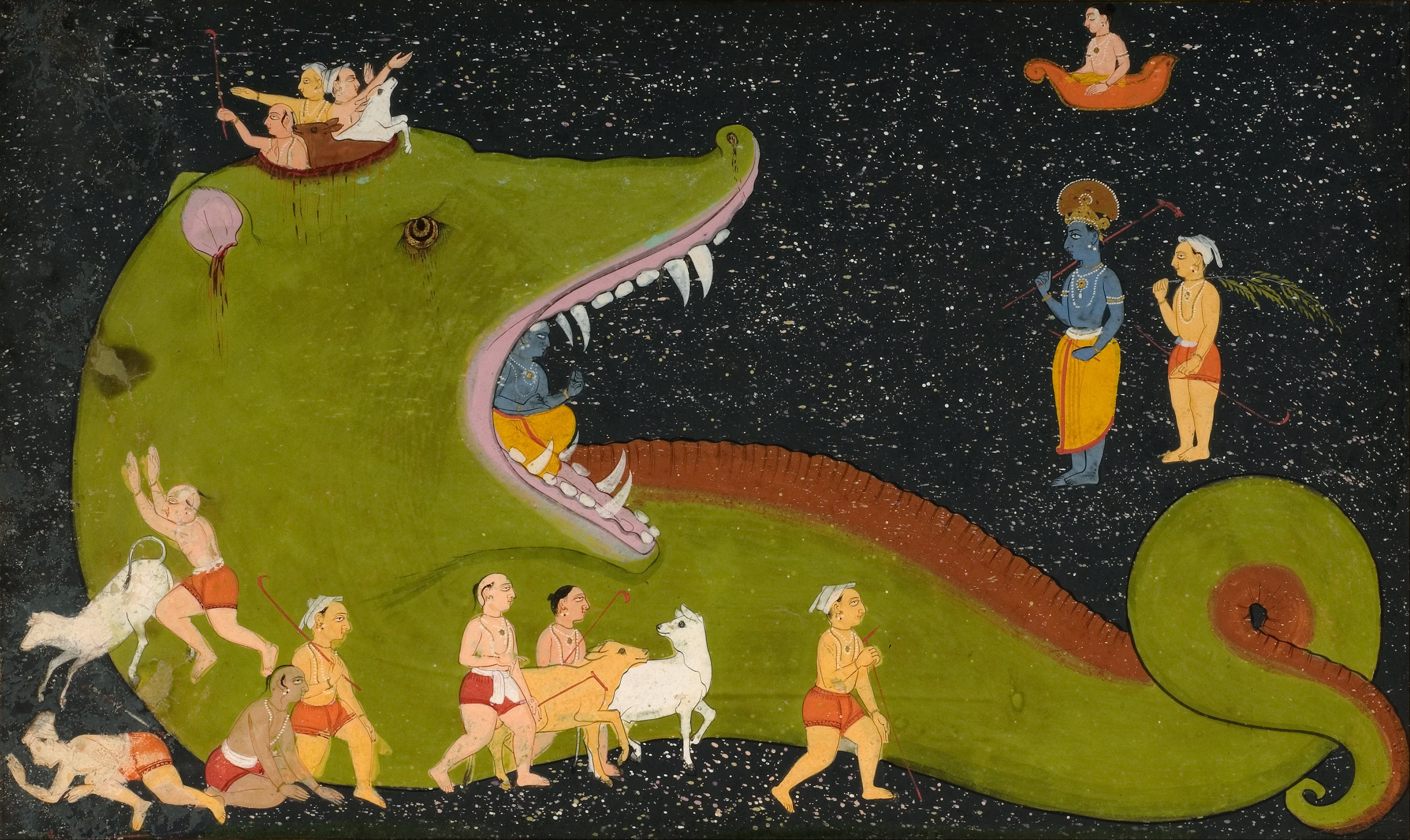
Krishna subdues the serpent Aghasura

== See also ==
- List of Asuras
- Trinavarta
- Vyomasura
