= Trinavarta =

Whirlwind demon slain by the Hindu deity Krishna

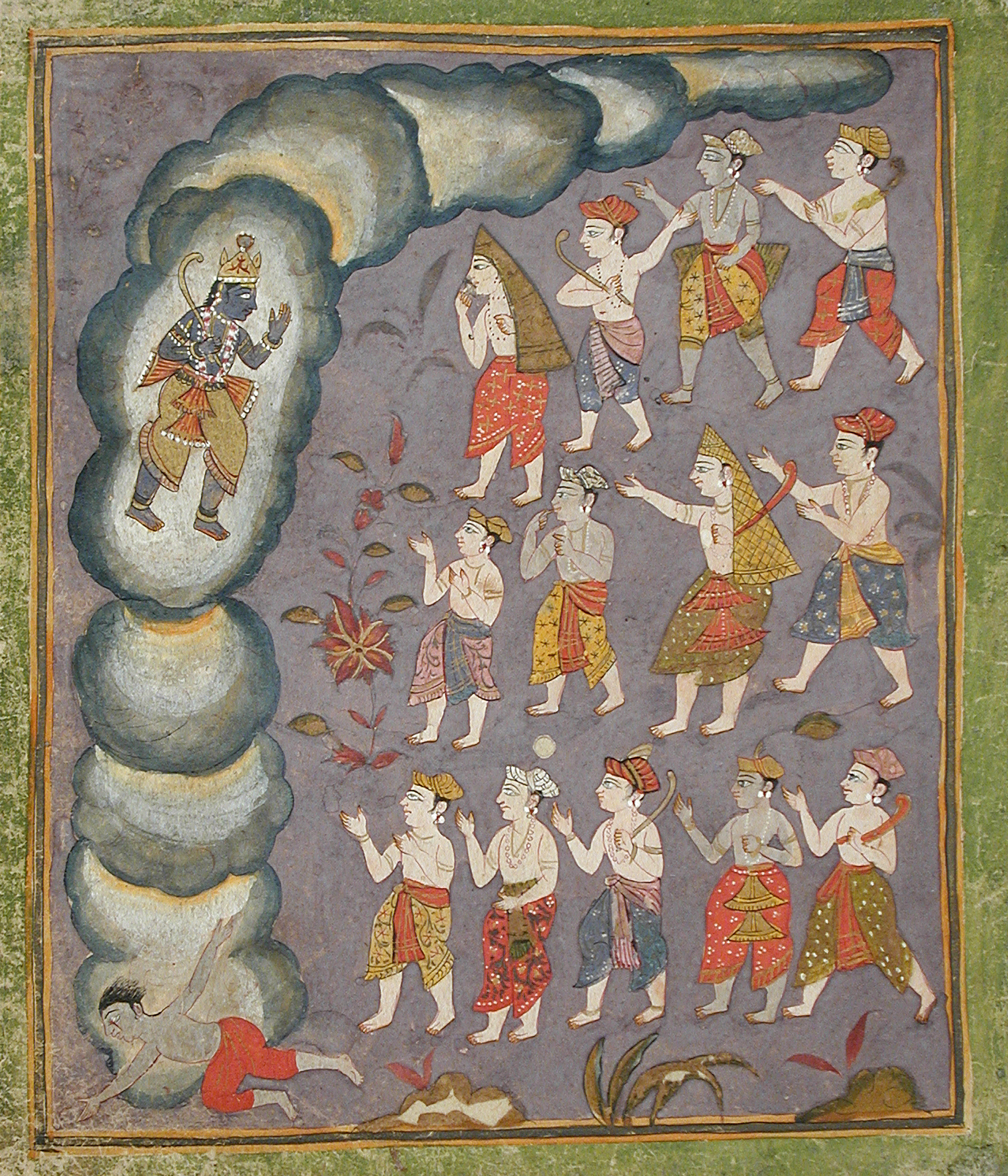
Krishna slays Trinavarta, depicted on a folio

Trinavarta (Sanskrit: तृणावर्त, IAST: Tṛṇāvarta) is an asura who is featured in Hindu literature, most prominently in the Bhagavata Purana. He is described to be a whirlwind asura dispatched by Kamsa to murder Krishna, but is slain by the deity instead.

== Legend ==
Kamsa sent Trinavarta to kill his nephew. Assuming the form of a whirlwind, Trinavarta carried away the sitting Krishna. He enveloped the whole of Gokulam with a cloud of dust and darkness, the resultant cover of sand particles causing great distress to Yashoda, who attempted to find her son with the help of the gopis. Even as the asura carried the deity to the sky, Krishna caused himself to possess enormous weight, halting the asura in his ascent, who was unable to carry him further. The deity then proceeded to clasp his captor's throat with intense force, which paralysed him and pushed out his eye-sockets. The asura descended back to the region of Vraja, where he was crushed to death upon a rock. Nanda and the gopas discovered the infant dangling upon the chest of the slain asura, completely unharmed.

== Literature ==
The Brahma Vaivarta Purana offers details regarding the previous birth of Trinavarta. According to the text, Trinavarta was previously a mighty Pandya king named Sahasraksha. Infatuated with passion, the king is stated to have engaged in amorous activities with a hundred damsels along the banks of a river named Pushpabhadra, located near the Gandhamadana mountain. The sage Durvasa appeared before Sahasraksha and the women, surrounded by his disciples. When the king failed to offer the sage the customary respect, he was cursed to be reborn as an asura, one whose liberation was to be received at the hands of Krishna.

The third volume of the Rukminisha Vijaya begins with Krishna's vanquishing of this asura.

== See also ==
- Aghasura
- Vyomasura
- Kaliya
