= Vyomasura =

Asura slain by the Hindu deity Krishna

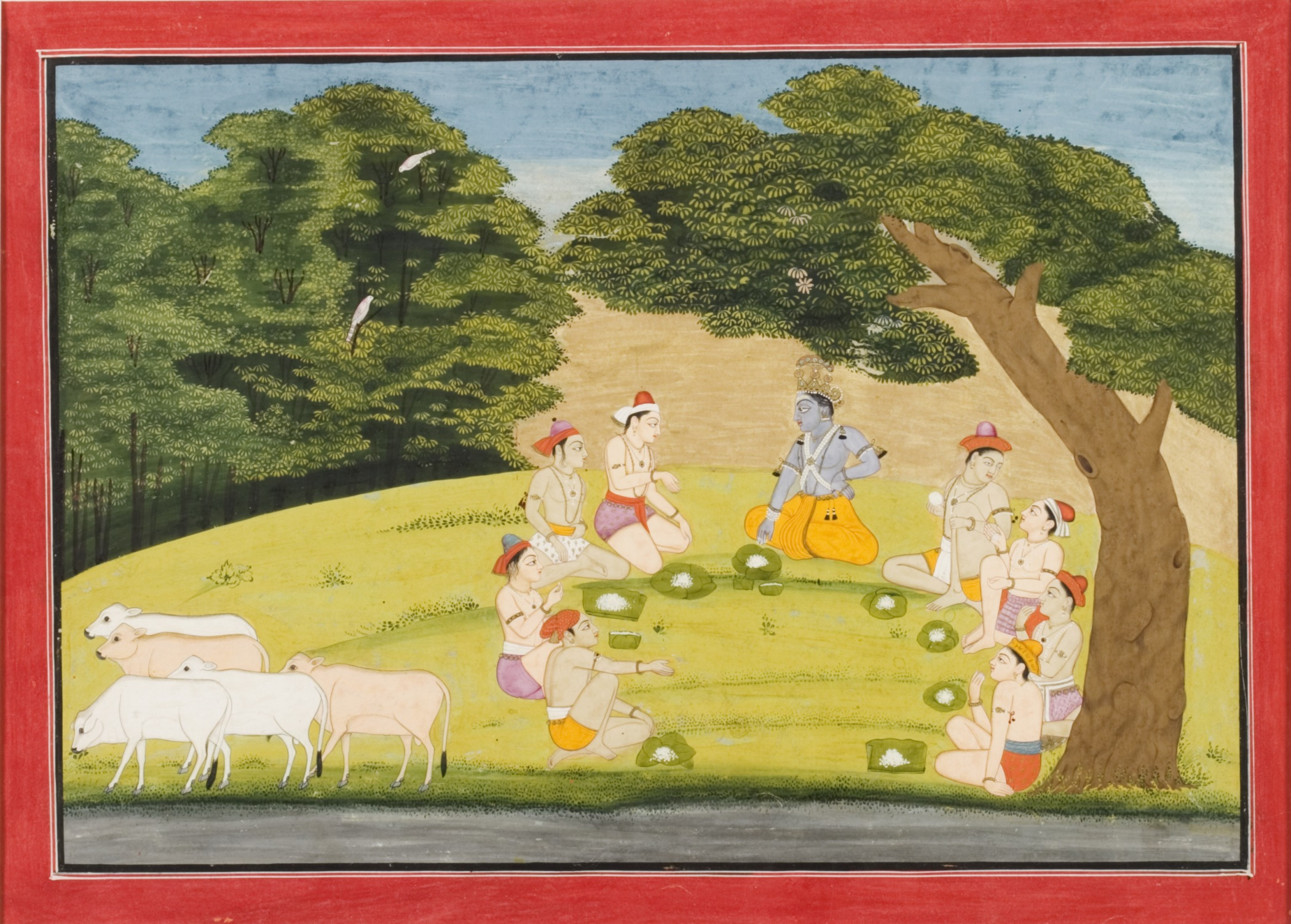
Krishna and the gopas, featured in the Bhagavata Purana

Vyomasura (Sanskrit: व्योमासुर, romanized: Vyomāsura) is an asura who appears in Hindu literature. He is a son of Mayasura. His death at the hands of the deity Krishna is described in the Bhagavata Purana.

== Legend ==
Following the slaying of the horse-asura Keshi by Krishna and Narada's salutation of him, the deity tended the cattle along a mountain slope along with the gopas, the cow-herding youth. They decided to play a game similar to hide-and-seek, where there divided themselves into the roles of three groups: the cattle, the cattle-keepers, who had to protect the cattle, and the cattle-lifters, who had to attempt to steal the animals. Vyoma, a magically-gifted asura who was the son of Mayasura, disguised himself as a youth, and played the part of a cattle-lifter, stealing away a number of the boys who posed as goats and other creatures. He carried each of them to the mountain caves and shut the boys within them, until only half a dozen boys had not been captured. Realising that his friends had been taken captive, Krishna caught hold of this asura, "as a lion would do a jackal". Mayasura assumed his true form as a massive mountain to escape from the deity's clutches, but to no avail. Krishna hurled him against the earth and suffocated him, even as the devas witnessed this act, and liberated his friends by breaking open the seals of the caves. After they praised him, Krishna returned home to Gokulam.

== See also ==
- Keshi
- Bakasura
- Putana
