= Dhenuka =

Asura slain by Balarama

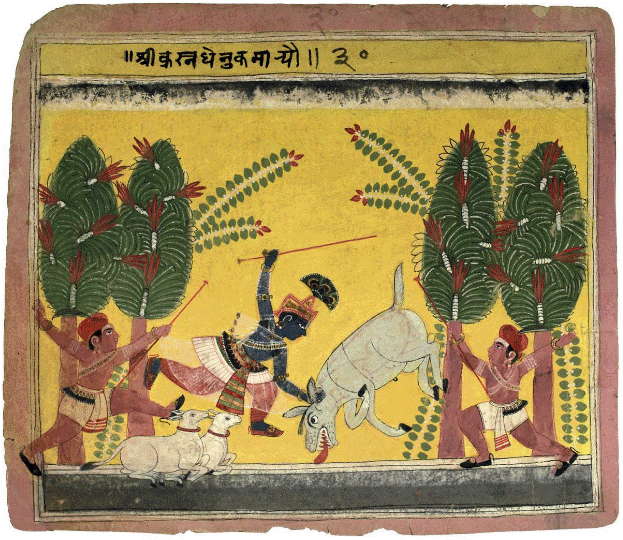
- A Krishna slays the Dhenukasura
- Texts: Harivamsa, Vishnu Purana

Information
- Affiliation: Asura

In Hindu mythology, Dhenuka, also known as Dhenukasura, is an asura (demon) killed by Balarama, the elder brother of Krishna.

The Harivamsa states that Dhenuka, with his host of attendant demons, all in the form of donkeys, ruled over a forest of tala or palms trees, situated on the banks of the Yamuna River, north of mount Govardhana. Once, Balarama, Krishna and cowherds wandered into this forest, captivated by the fragrance of the fruits of the palm trees. When Krishna commented on the possible sweet taste of the fruit, Balarama shook the trees and the fruits fell on the ground. A jealous Dhenuka charged at Balarama, bit him and kicked with his hind legs. Balarama caught hold of Dhenuka's legs and whirled him towards a tree, shattering his chest, neck and waist as the tree fell with the demon. Balarama killed Dhenuka's demon attendants and set the forest open for the cowherds.

== In Literature ==
The Vishnu Purana also describes his legend:

AGAIN, tending upon the herds, Keśava and Rāma wandered through the woods, and on one occasion came to a pleasing grove of palms, where dwelt the fierce demon Dhenuka, feeding upon the flesh of deer. Beholding the trees covered with fruit, and desirous of gathering it, the cowherds called out to the brothers, and said, “See, Rāma; see, Kṛṣṇa; in this grove, belonging to the great Dhenuka, the trees are loaded with ripe fruit, the smell of which perfumes the air: we should like to eat some. Will you throw some down?” As soon as the boys had spoken, Saṅkarṣaṇa and Kṛṣṇa shook the trees, and brought down the fruit on the ground. Hearing the noise of the falling fruit, the fierce and malignant demon Dhenuka, in the form of an ass, hastened to the spot in a great passion, and began to kick Rāma on the breast with his hinder heels. Rāma, however, seized him by both hind legs, and whirling him round until he expired, tossed his carcass to the top of a palm tree, from the branches of which it struck down abundance of fruit, like rain drops poured upon earth by the wind. The animals that were of kin to Dhenuka came running to his aid; but Kṛṣṇa and Rāma treated them in the same manner, until the trees were laden with dead asses, and the ground was strewed with ripe fruit. Henceforward the cattle grazed unobstructed in the palm grove, and cropped the new pasturage, where they had never before ventured.

— Vishnu Purana, Chapter 8

== See also ==
- List of Asuras
- Kaliya
- Bakasura
