= Bala Krishna =

Boyhood form of Hindu deity Krishna

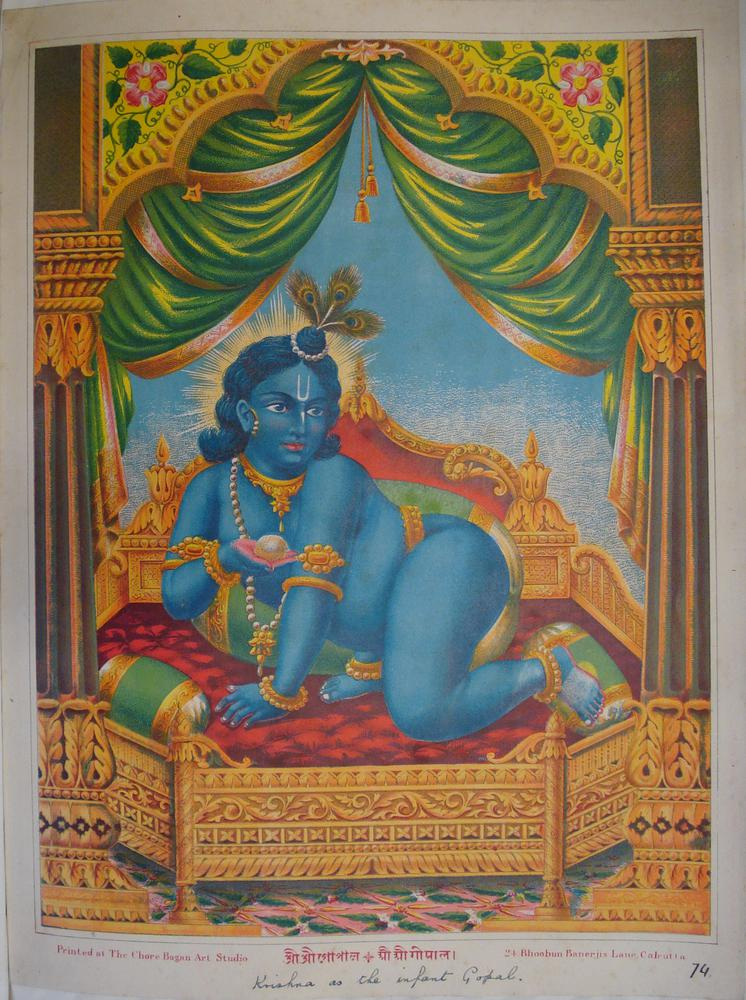
Bala Krishna holding a butter-ball in his hand, c. 1895 lithograph

Bala Krishna (Sanskrit: बाल कृष्ण, romanized: Bālakṛṣṇa, lit. 'child Krishna/divine child Krishna') or Bala Gopala, refers to the boyhood form of the Hindu deity Krishna. The worship of Krishna as a divine child was historically one of the early forms of worship in Krishnaism.

== Legend ==
The eighth son of Devaki and Vasudeva, Krishna was born to fulfil the prophecy of slaying his tyrannical uncle and the king of Mathura, Kamsa. As soon as he was born in a prison with his parents, he asked his father to carry him to the region of Vraja, where he would spend his childhood among the cowherds, along with his brother, Balarama. In the settlement of Gokulam, he was raised by his foster-parents, Yashoda and Nanda.

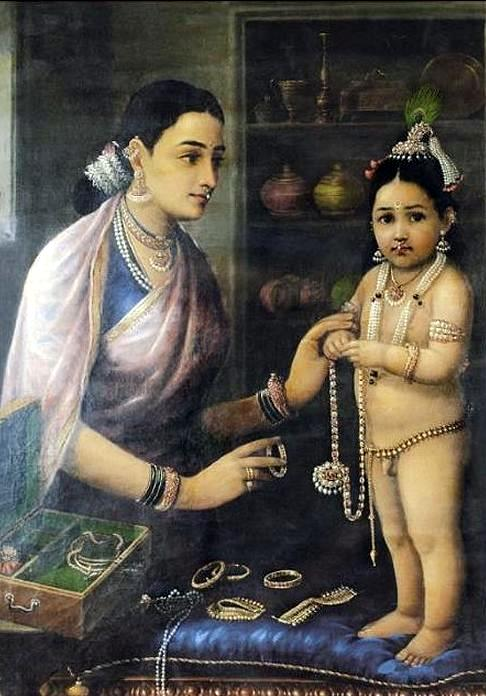
Painting of Yashoda adorning Krishna with ornaments, Raja Ravi Varma.

As a toddler, Krishna is best recognised for his tales of mischievous antics, such as stealing butter from the families of the cowherds of Gokulam. Butter is often interpreted as a metaphor for love in the traditions of Krishna-devotion, associated with its properties of non-quantifiability and abundance. The child Krishna also untethers cows, teases children, and expresses a disdain for social conventions. This is often interpreted as a part of his līlā, his divine play in which he intimately interacts with the world around him.

Bala Krishna is also said to have performed a number of miraculous acts. His tyrannical uncle, Kamsa, hearing of his birth, sent a number of malicious asuras and beasts to murder him, but all of their efforts were foiled. Putana, a shapeshifting demoness, was killed when the baby Krishna sucked her life from her by taking the poisoned breast she offered him. Another asura named Bakasura assumed the form of a crane or a stork and attempted to swallow Krishna, but he was slain instead when the deity broke his beak. When Aghasura, assuming the form of a snake, swallowed Krishna and his friends, the deity grew to a massive size within him, slaying him.

Some of his legends are associated with liberation, as in the Bhagavata Purana's story of Manigriva and Nalakuvara. The sons of Kubera, the god of wealth, these brothers are described to have once caroused with maidens at Shiva's mountain pleasure garden, when the divine sage, Narada, appeared. While the girls respectfully covered themselves, the brothers ignored him, their arrogance caused by their great wealth. This prompted Narada to curse them to take the forms of two motionless trees until they were freed by Krishna. Once, in order to prevent her son from causing further mischief, Yashoda tied him up to a grinding mortar. The child Krishna was still able to crawl away, and found himself being wedged between two arjuna trees. His waist tethered to the mortar behind him, Krishna pulled, uprooting the trees. Freed from Narada's curse, Manigriva and Nalakuvara assumed their true forms, and offered their obeisance to the deity before they returned to their abode.

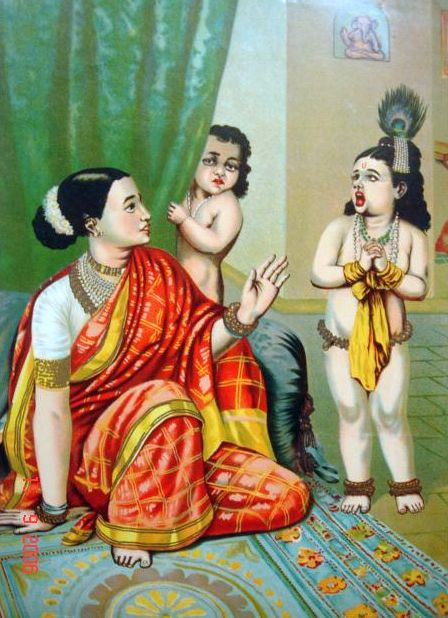
Painting of Krishna opening his mouth, revealing the cosmos to Yashoda.

In one of his most popular legends, Krishna's playmates are said to have accused him of eating mud to Yashoda. When Yashoda started to scold him, Krishna denied this claim, and opened his mouth wide so that she could see for herself. Yashoda witnessed a cosmic vision of all matter within his mouth, observing space, the cardinal directions, earth and its islands, oceans, and mountains, constellations, the mind, the elements, and finally also herself in his gaping mouth, leaving her bewildered.

In his iconography, he is often depicted as a small child crawling on his hands and knees, or dancing with a piece of butter in his hand.

In the Bhagavad Gita, one interpretation speculates Krishna teaching a universal monotheistic religion, a revelation of him being the Svayam Bhagavan. The childhood episodes of Krishna's legend became the focus of the medieval devotional cults that started to develop into a number of movements in medieval India.

== Worship ==
The worship of Bala Krishna, the divine child, while a significant feature of the Krishna religion, often receives less attention, despite being one of the most popular deities of Krishna in many parts of India today. Early evidence of such worship can be found or as early as the 4th century BCE, according to evidence in Megasthenes and in the Arthashastra of Kautilya, when Vāsudeva, as the son of Vasudeva, was worshipped as the supreme deity in a strongly monotheistic format, where the Supreme Being was perfect, eternal, and full of grace.

The veneration of Bala Krishna is included as a part of the various forms of worship that culminated with the worship of Krishna as the Svayam Bhagavan in various schools of Vaishnavism. The monotheistic tradition of Bhagavatism, and the cults of Gopala Krishna, Radha Krishna, and Vasudeva-Krishna, form the basis of the current tradition of Krishnaism, as well as Krishna in mainstream Vaishnavism.

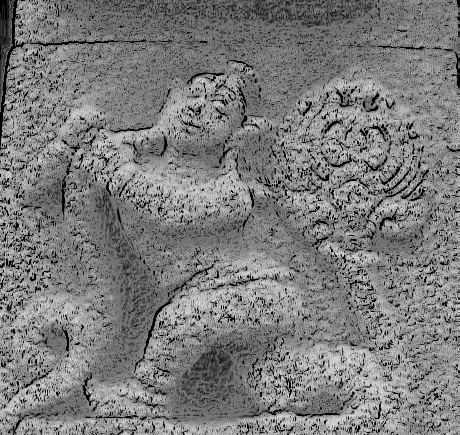
A 14th-15th century CE relief of Balakrishna in Hampi, Vijayanagara in Karnataka South India

A prominent historical site dedicated to the veneration of Bala Krishna is the Balakrishna temple in Hampi, built by the Vijayanagara ruler Krishnadevaraya in 1513 CE. The main altar of this temple is dedicated to Bala Krishna, and it is one of the rare temples where the stories of the Puranas are carved on the walls of the temple and its rajagopuram.

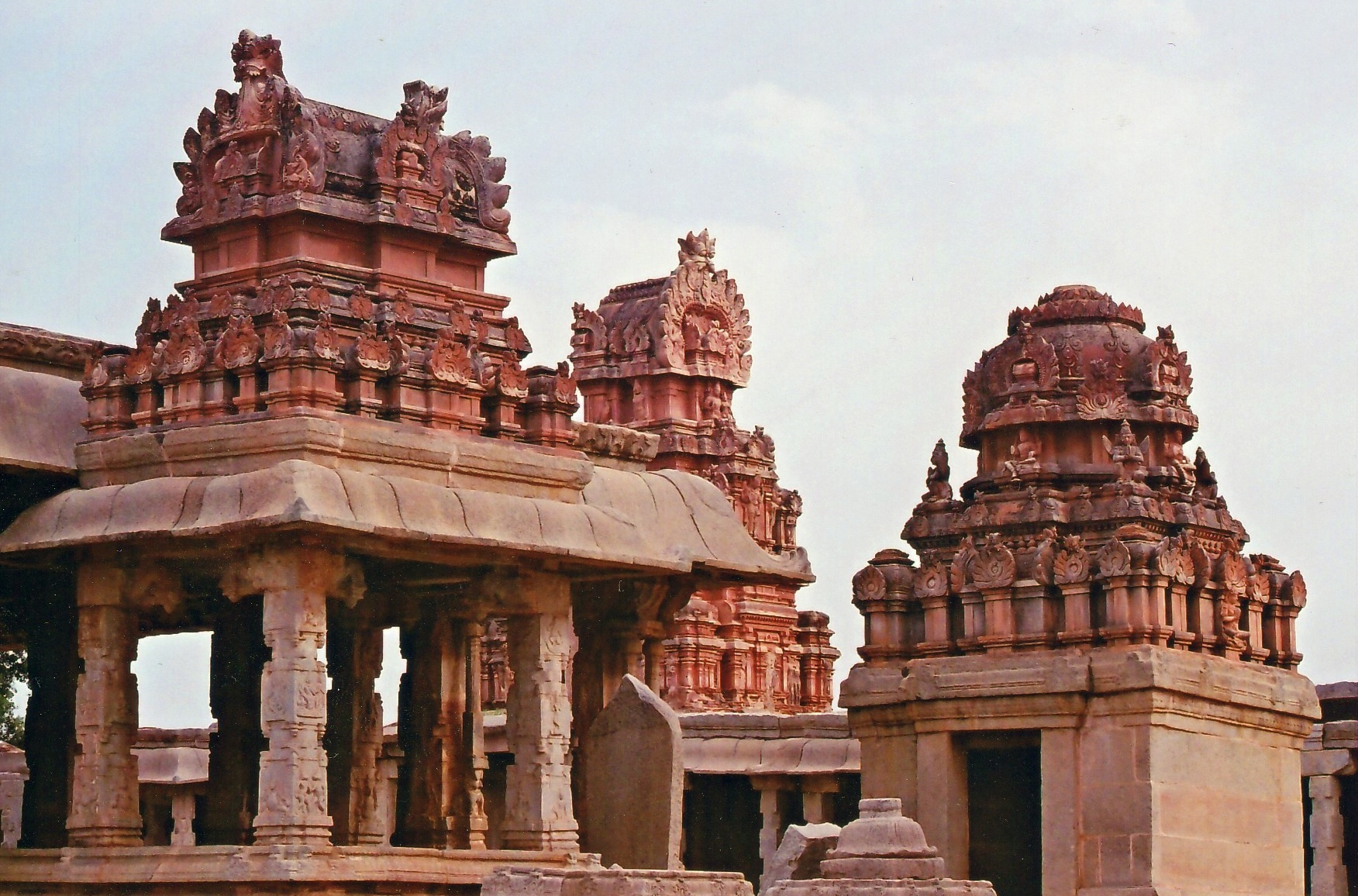
View of the temple of Bala Krishna at Hampi

The Udupi Sri Krishna Matha is also a notable site that contains a murti of Bala Krishna. According to regional legend, it is believed to have been transported by sea from Dvaraka. It is also regarded to be the same image that was venerated by the chief queen of Krishna, Rukmini. The saint Madhvacharya is regarded to have placed the image that is observed by pilgrims to this day. The sacred lamps at this statue of Bala Krishna regarded to have been recovered from the sea in the 14th century were said to have been lit by Madhvacharya himself and are being always kept alight, and that is for the last 700 years.

At the very beginning of his work to establish Hindu Krishna temples in the west, the Gaudiya guru Bhaktivedanta Swami Prabhupada wanted to establish a prominent temple in New York City dedicated to Bala Krishna, even before starting ISKCON. He wrote the following to one of his supporters in India:

I think therefore that a temple of Bala Krishna in New York may immediately be started for this purpose. And as a devotee of Lord Bala Krishna, you should execute this great and noble work. Till now there is no worshipable temple of the Hindus in New York, although in India there are so many American missionary establishments and churches.

— to S. Morarji, 1965

== See also ==
- Gopala Krishna
- Radha Krishna
- Vasudeva Krishna
