= Keshava =

Epithet for Hindu god Vishnu and Krishna

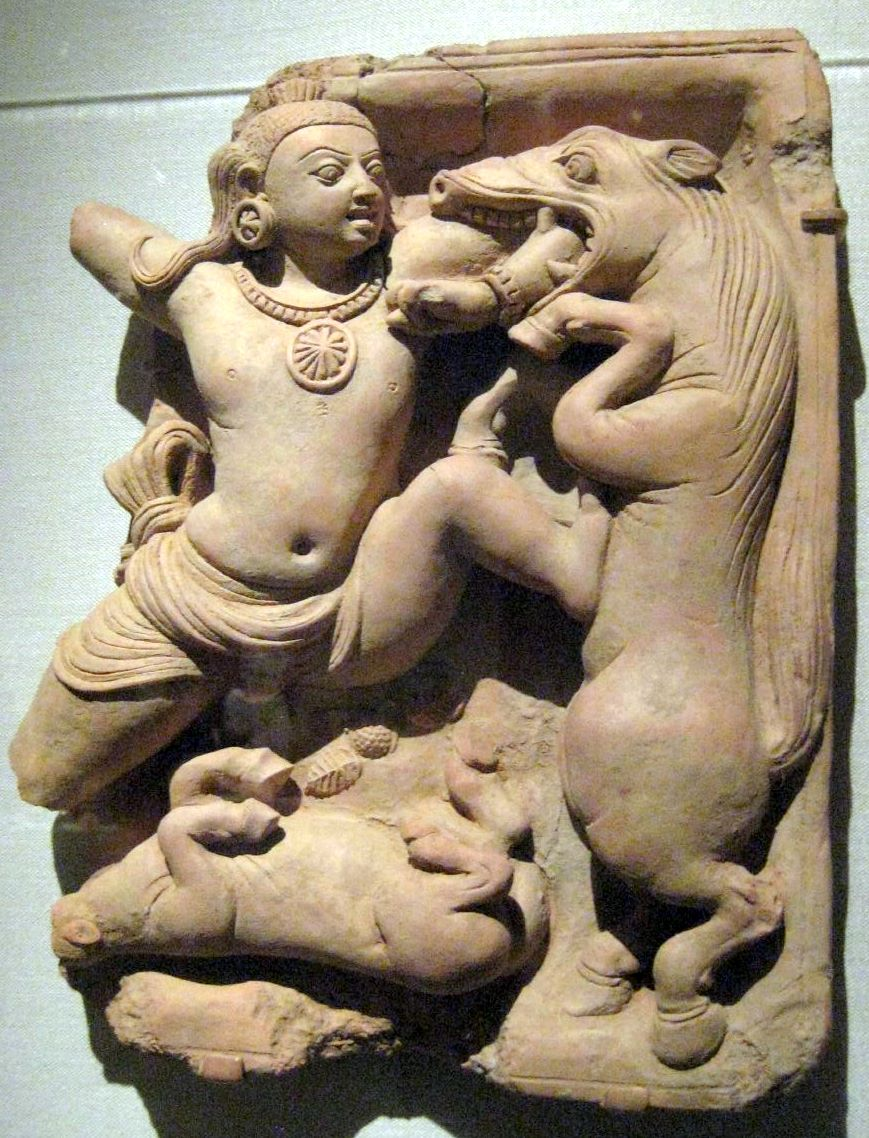
Keshava (Krishna) slays Keshi

Keshava (Sanskrit: केशव, lit. 'one who has beautiful long hair or the slayer of Keshi', IAST: Keśava) is an epithet of Vishnu in Hindu tradition. The name appears as the 23rd and 648th names in the Vishnu Sahasranama of the Mahabharata.

== Etymology ==
Keshava means "the one with beautiful long (unshorn) hair" or "killer of the Keshi demon". According to the Padma Purana, the name refers to Krishna's long, beautiful-looking unshorn hair. Referring to Sangraha Ramayana of Narayana Panditacharya, Authors Meenakshi Bharat and Madhu Grover says that "The name Keshava refers to Vishnu. The letter 'Ka' refers to Brahma and 'Isha' refers to Shiva. The word Keshava refers to one who animates both Brahma and Shiva".

== Literature ==
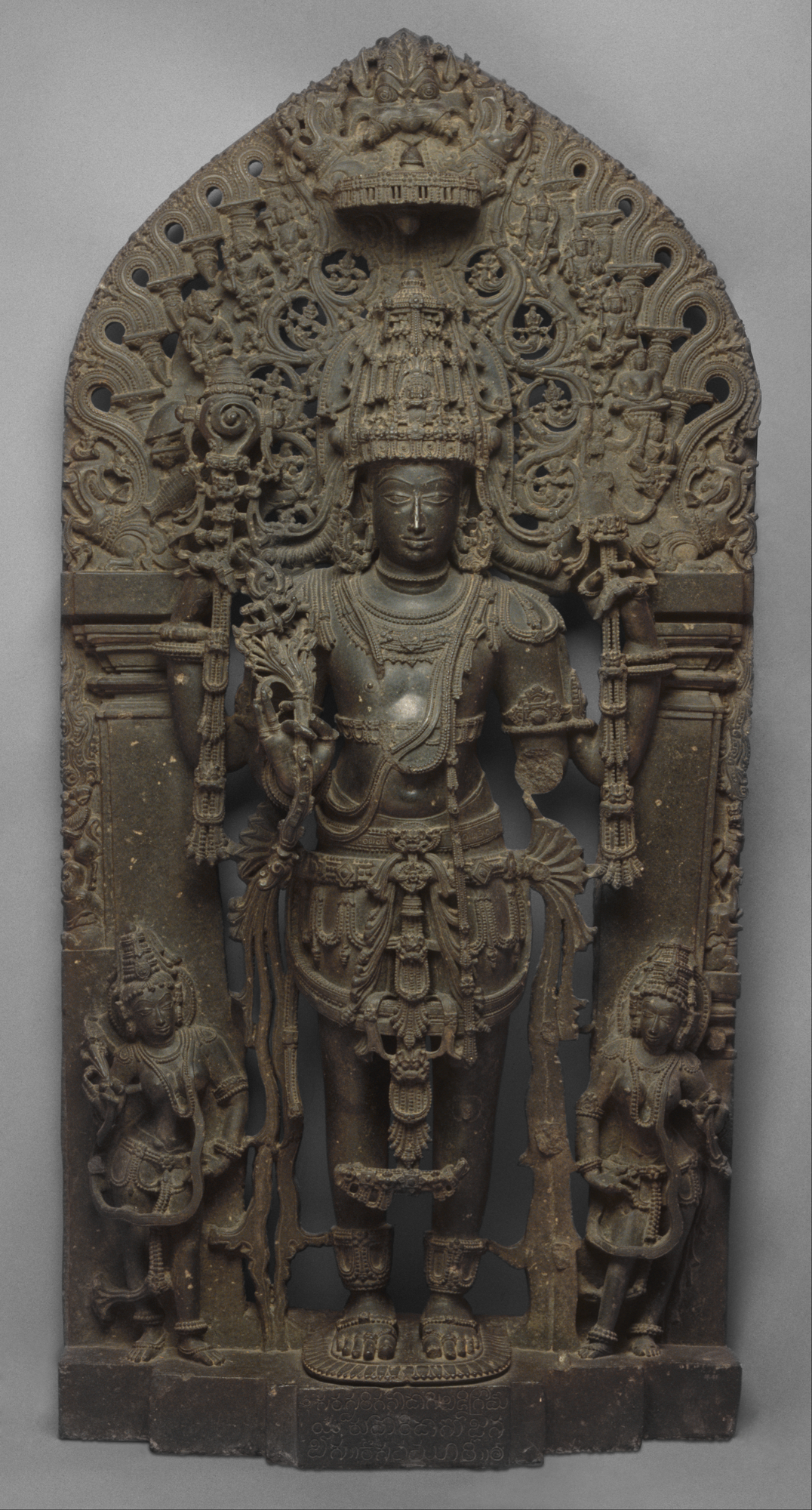
Representation of Vishnu as Keshava. His consorts Sridevi and Bhudevi are on either side. Above him are representations of Vishnu's ten avatars.

A verse from the Vishnu Sahasranama mentions Keshava:

आकाशात् पतितं तोयं यथागच्छति सागरम् ।
'सर्वदव नमस्कारः केशवं प्रतिगच्छति ॥'

ākāśāt patitaṃ toyaṃ yathāgacchati sāgaram

sarvadeva namaskāraḥ keśavaṃ pratigacchati

Just as the rainwater falling on the earth reaches the ocean, in the same way, offerings (namaskara) made to various deities ultimately reach only one God Keshava (Vishnu).

In Bhagavad Gita, Arjuna uses the name Keshava for Krishna a number of times, referring to him as the 'killer of the Keshi demon':

"I am now unable to stand here any longer. I am forgetting myself, and my mind is reeling. I see only causes of misfortune, O Kesava, killer of the Keśī demon."

— Bhagavad Gita, Verse 1.30

The demon Keshi, in the form of a horse, was sent by Kamsa to kill Krishna, but was overpowered and slain (Vishnu Purana 5.15-16).

== Sources ==
- Dictionary of Hindu Lore and Legend (ISBN 0-500-51088-1) by Anna Dhallapiccola
- Bharat, Meenakshi; Grover, Madhu (2019). Representing the Exotic and the Familiar: Politics and perception in literature. John Benjamins Publishing Company. ISBN 9789027261908.
