= Keshi (demon) =

Demon in Hindu mythology

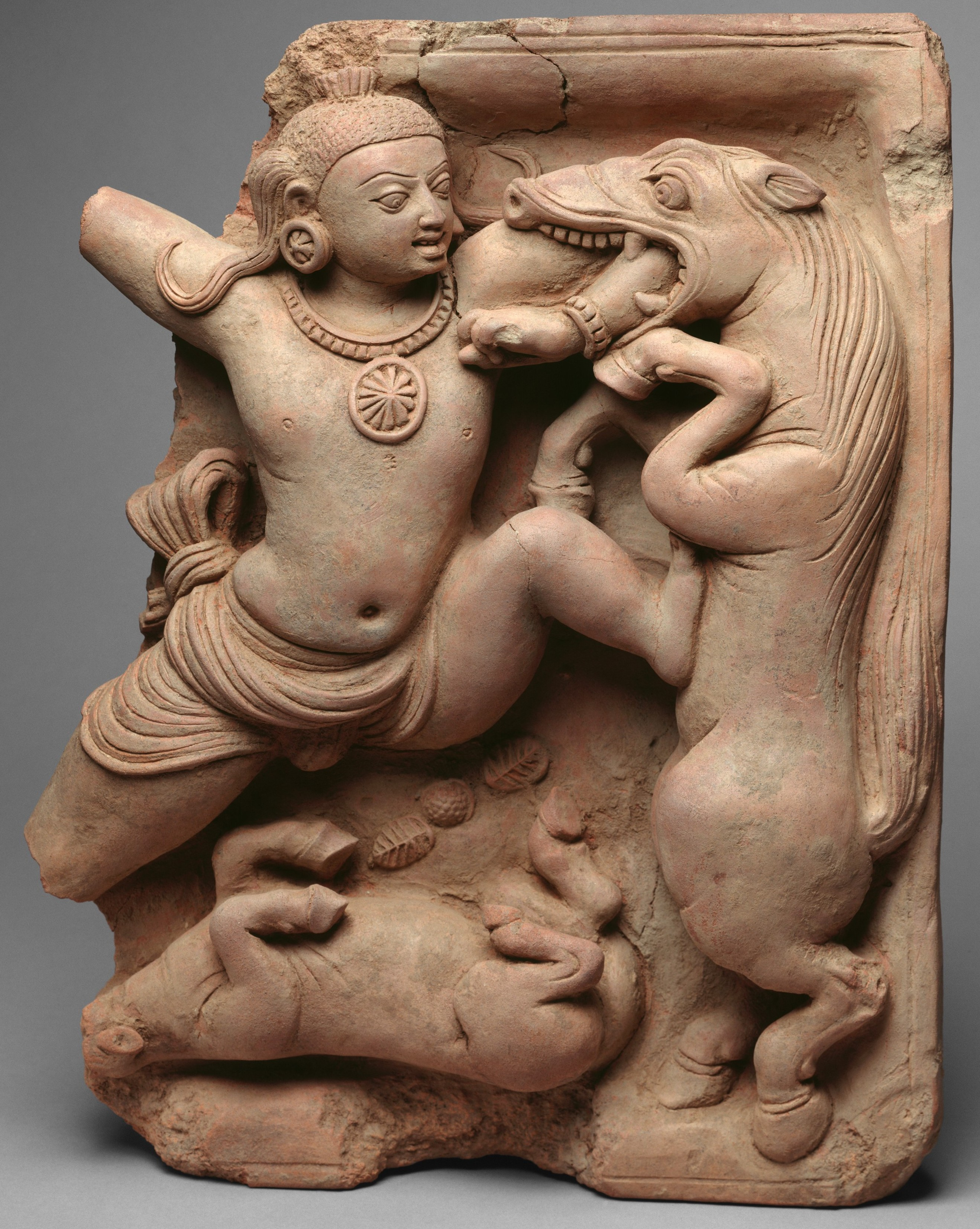
Krishna Killing the Horse Demon Keshi, Gupta period (ca. 321–500), Metropolitan Museum of Art.

In Hindu mythology, Keshin (Sanskrit: केशिन्, lit. 'the hairy one/long-haired' IAST: Keśin), also called Keshi (Sanskrit: केशी IAST: Keśī) is a horse-demon, killed by Krishna, an Avatara of Vishnu. The demon was dispatched by Krishna's evil uncle Kamsa, who was destined to die at Krishna's hands.

The tale of the slaying of Keshi is told in the Hindu scriptures of Bhagavata Purana, Vishnu Purana and Harivamsa. Krishna is often praised as Keshava - the slayer of Keshi - in scriptures.

== Legend ==
A Krishna Destroys the Horse Demon Keshi

Keshi's legend is recounted in the tenth Book of the Bhagavata Purana (between 500 CE - 1000 CE). Kamsa, the evil king of Mathura and the maternal uncle of Krishna, is destined to be killed by Krishna. In an attempt to avoid his death, Kamsa sends a series of demons to Gokula, where Krishna is staying with his foster-parents. After Krishna kills the bull demon Arishta, the divine sage Narada confirms to Kamsa that Krishna is his sister Devaki's child and that the girl-child that Kamsa had killed, mistaking her for the child of Devaki, was in fact the daughter of Yashoda, Krishna's foster-mother. Infuriated at hearing this, Kamsa calls the demon Keshi and orders him to kill Krishna and his brother Balarama.

Keshi assumes the form of a huge horse, who gallops at the speed of thoughts, wears the earth with his hooves and scatters celestial vehicles and clouds in the sky with his mane. His neighing terrifies the people. Krishna challenges Keshi to a duel, as the horse is creating havoc around Gokula. Keshi roars like a lion and charges towards Krishna, striking him with his hooves. Krishna catches hold of Keshi's two legs and tosses him to a great distance. Recovering from the fall, the agitated Keshi opens his mouth and attacks Krishna. As soon as Krishna thrusts his left arm into Keshi's mouth, all of Keshi's teeth fall. Krishna's arm expands, and Keshi chokes to death, as sweat flows from his body, his eyes roll and he struggles kicking his feet. As Keshi falls lifeless on the ground, assuming his true demon form, the gods and Narada extol Krishna. Narada in his panegyric thanks Krishna for easily slaying the horse-demon, whose neighing alone was driving the gods to abandon heaven. He further prophesies the great deeds that Krishna will perform later, including the killing of Kamsa.

The fourth Book of the Vishnu Purana (between the 1st century BCE to the 4th century CE) also tells the story. However, Keshi first appears in the episode when Kamsa calls the host of demons to kill all male children, once he realizes Krishna is born. Chapters 15 and 16 of the fourth Book presents a detailed account of Keshi's death which parallels the Bhagavata Purana account. The narrative of Arishta's death, Narada's disclosure to Kamsa and the subsequent ordering of Keshi is the same. Though the terror by Keshi on earth and sky and Krishna's challenge is the same, the fight starts directly with Keshi attacking Krishna with his opened mouth. The hand of Krishna choking Keshi at the same time, tearing his body into two halves. The splitting of Keshi's body is not told in the Bhagavata Purana. Narada's eulogy and prophesy about Kamsa's death follows the account, where Narada decreed that Krishna would be called Keshava, the slayer of Keshi.

The Harivamsa from the epic Mahabharata also narrates the incident in a similar fashion complete with Narada's praise identifying Krishna as Vishnu. The Vishnu Purana and the Harivamsa (1st - 2nd century BCE) tell that Keshi is the last agent sent by Kamsa to kill Krishna, after Keshi's killing, Krishna and Balarama go to Mathura, where Kamsa is killed. However, the Bhagavata Purana describes the killing of the demon Vyoma sent by Kamsa, before he leaves for Mathura.

The first century CE Buddhist writer Ashvaghosa also mentions the killing of Keshi in a passage in his Saundarananda.

== Origins ==
In the Atharvaveda (2nd millennium BCE), Keshi, the "hairy one", first appears as being described as a demon who attacks the unborn, though not in relation to Krishna. A line from passage 8.6 which describes evils that attack female fetuses reads as: "Let us keep the black asura Keśin, born in the reed clump, snout-mouthed and all other harmful creatures, away from her genitals and her loins" [IAST original]. Phyllis Granoff, a scholar on Indian religions, opines that the Keshi is a demon of childhood diseases or miscarriage, like the demoness Putana, who were both killed by the infant Krishna. However, this hypothesis is not unanimous. The tales of Keshi-vadha ("The killing of Keshi") are well known in the Kushan period (60-375 CE). Metropolitan Museum of Art parallels Krishna killing Keshi to the labour of Greek hero Heracles - slaying the horses of Diomedes. Keshi or Keśī could be the earliest Sanskrit word known in Chinese; the (2nd century BCE) Huainanzi records treasures given in ransom for King Wen of Zhou to Di Xin in 1103 BCE, including the mount named jisi 雞斯 or Old Chinese *kese.

== Commemoration ==
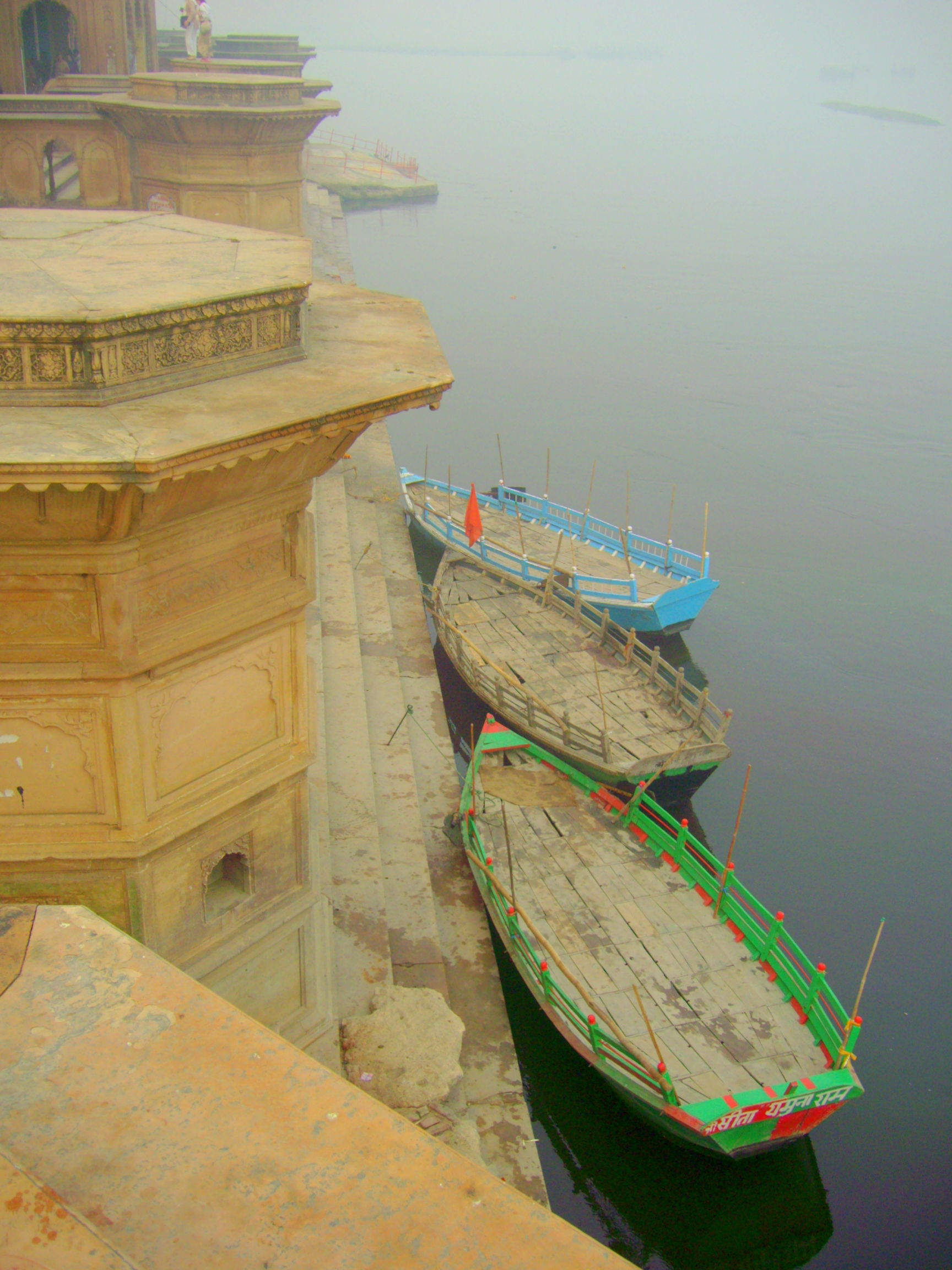
Keshighat in Vrindavan commemorating Keshi's battle with Krishna.

According to the Malayalam Bhagavata Purana, Krishna got the name Keshava as he slew Keshi. Krishna is referred to as slayer of Keshi three times in the Bhagavata Gita by Arjuna - Keshava (1.30 and 3.1) and Keshi-nisudana (18.1). In the first chapter (1.30), addressing Krishna as slayer of Keshi, Arjuna expresses his doubts about war, at the same time, finds Krishna capable of destroying them. Here, Keshi represents false pride and the reference as slayer of Keshi by Arjuna expresses his humility. Keshi as a mad horse who created havoc in Gokula - also represents the wild horse of doubts who run in the mind of a person. In the third chapter, Arjuna ask a question to Lord Kṛṣṇa: "If it is your conclusion that knowledge is superior to action, O Janārdana, why do you direct me to do this terrible deed, o Keśava?" (3.1). In the last chapter (18.1), Arjuna addresses Krishna as Maha-baho ("mighty-armed") paired with the slayer of Keshi epithet, reminding the reader how Krishna killed Keshi with his arms alone. The Vishnu sahasranama ("The Thousand names of Vishnu") calls Krishna as Keshava (Names 23, 648) and Keshitha (649) - the slayer of Keshi. The fourth century play Mudrarakshasa also interprets the epithet Keshava as the slayer of Keshi. Keshighat is a major bathing ghat along the river Yamuna in Vrindavan, where Krishna is believed to have overpowered Keshi.
