= Bakasura (crane demon) =

Crane demon in Hindu mythology

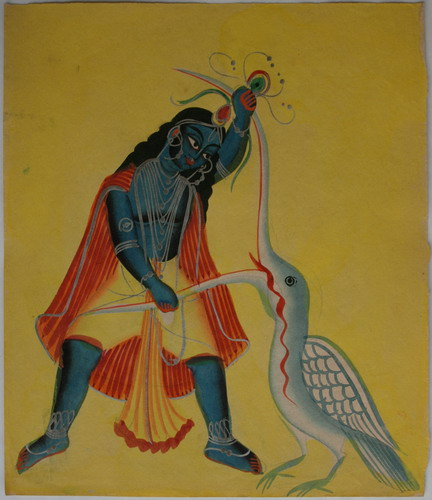
19th century Kalighat Painting of Krishna killing Bakasura

Bakasura (Sanskrit: बकासुर, IAST: Bakāsura) or Vakasura is the crane asura killed by the Hindu god Krishna. He is the companion of King Kamsa and the brother of Putana and Aghasura. He was sent by him in the form of a giant crane to kill Krishna so that the boy would not be able to kill the king, which was claimed as a prophecy by an unknown voice and the Devi Yogamaya. Bakasura was then killed by Krishna when the boy pushed his beak until it snapped.

== Legend ==
Bala Krishna with his brother Balarama and the cowherd boys (gopas) were enjoying their pastimes with their cows near the banks of the Yamuna river, while in other accounts they were in the forests of Gokul. Bakasura, in the form of a crane with a sharp beak, swooped down from the sky and swallowed Krishna, but he felt intense heat in his throat, causing him to vomit the child out. Krishna then caught Bakasura by the beak and pushed it until it snapped, causing the asura to expire and attain Moksha (liberation), as it is believed that Krishna can liberate anyone's Atman (roughly translating to soul) if he slays them.
