= Harivaṃśa =

Work of Sanskrit literature

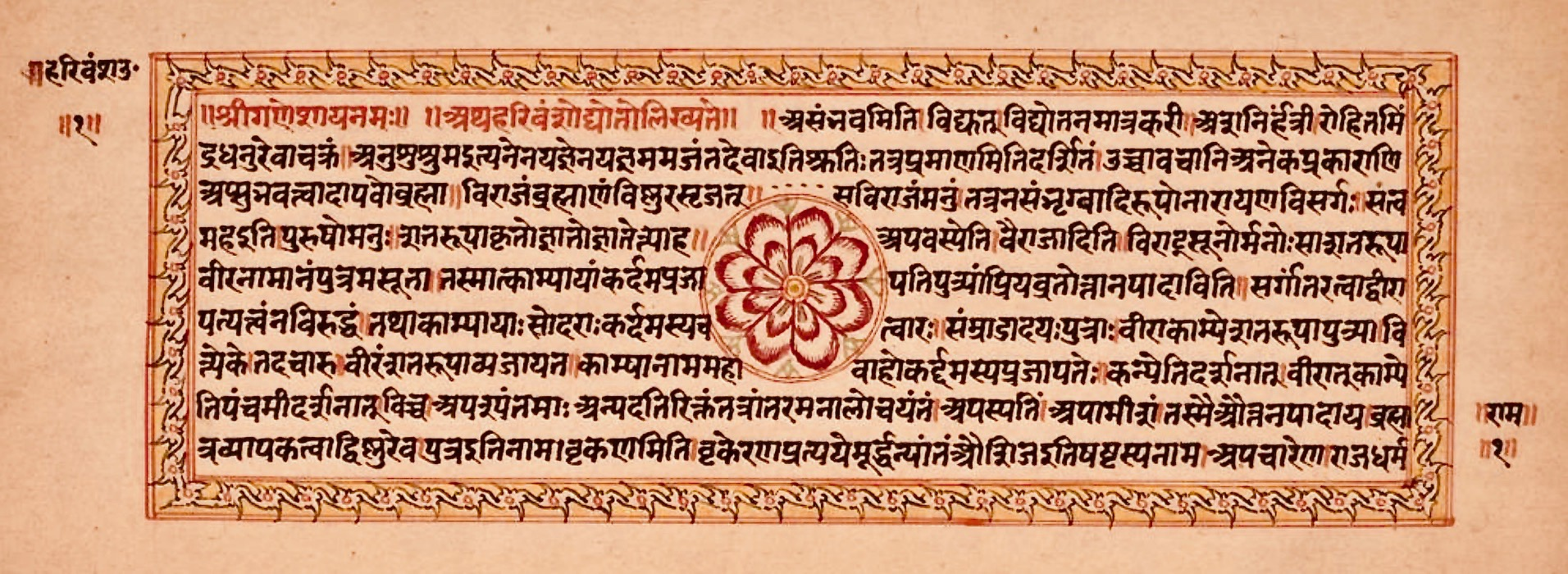
18th century Harivaṁśa manuscript in Devanāgari script

The Harivamsa (Sanskrit: हरिवंश, IAST: Harivaṃśa, lit. 'The Genealogy of Hari') is an important work of Sanskrit literature, containing 16,374 shlokas, mostly in the anustubh metre. The text is also known as Harivamsa Purana which is believed to be a khila (appendix or supplement) to the Mahabharata. Authorship of the text is traditionally ascribed to Vyasa.

== Structure ==
Harivamsa is divided into three books or Parvas. The first book named Adi Parva contains 55 chapters describing creation of the cosmos and the legendary history of the kings of the Solar and Lunar dynasties leading up to the birth of Krishna. The second book named Vishnu Parva contains 128 chapters recounting the legend of Krishna up to the events prior to the Mahabharata. The third booked named Bhavishya Parva contains 135 chapters presenting two alternate theories of creation, hymns to Shiva and Vishnu, and a description of Kali Yuga.

According to a traditional version of the Mahabharata, the Harivamsa is divided into two parvas (books) and 12,000 verses. These two are included with the eighteen parvas of the Mahabharata. However, other versions have three parvas and 16,374 verses, whereas a critical edition of the text has only 5,965 verses.

== Content ==
Harivamsa describes the human incarnations of Lord Vishnu and genealogy of such incarnations on earth. The three books describe the glories of the descendants Solar Dynasty (Suryavamsha) and Lunar Dynasty (Chandravamsha) in Treta Yuga and Dvapara Yuga, as well as future royal lineages in Kali Yuga. The text also contains hymns for worshipping various deities.

Harivamsa is regarded as an important source of information about beliefs about the origin of Vishnu's incarnation Krishna. However, there is speculation as to whether this text was derived from an earlier text and what its relationship is to the Brahma Purana, another text on the divine origins of Krishna.

== Chronology ==
Dwarka in Gujarat, India

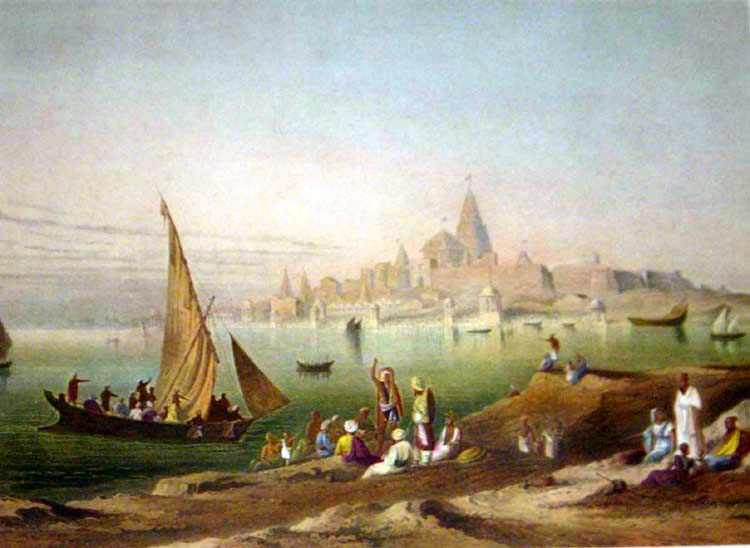
Dwarka is the setting for many chapters in the Harivamsa. The city is described as near the sea, in modern era Gujarat; a painting of the city in the 19th century (lower).

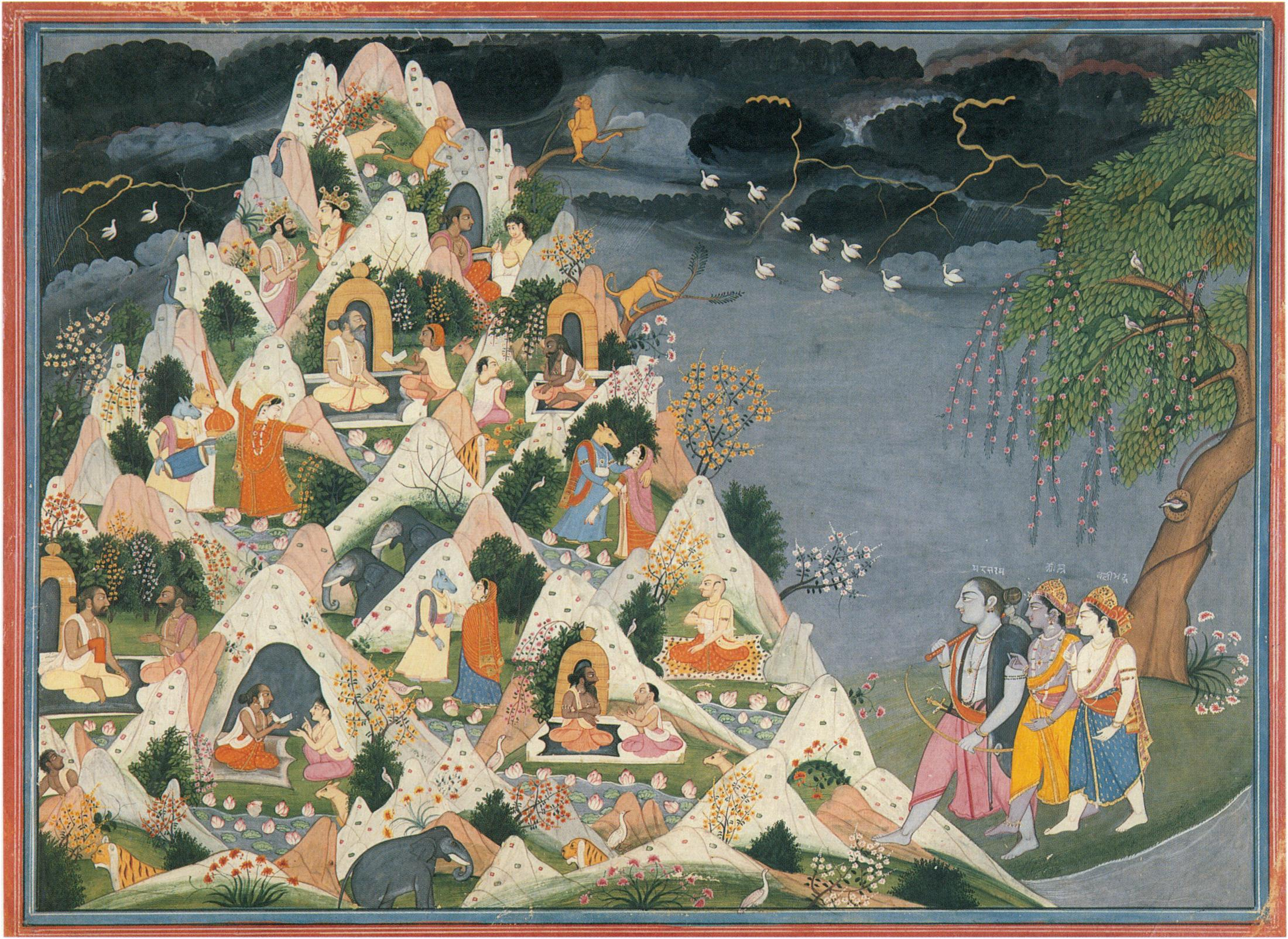
Parashurama leads Krishna and Balarama toward Mount Gomanta. Miniature from a Harivamsha series ascribed to Purkhu of Kangra. Kangra, c. 1800-1815. Government Museum and Art Gallery, Chandigarh

The bulk of the text is derived from two traditions, the pañcalakṣaṇa tradition, that is, the five marks of the Purana corpus one of which is the vaṃśa genealogy, and stories about the life of Krishna as a herdsman.

The text is complex, containing layers that go back to the 1st or 2nd centuries BCE.

Probably there was an oral previous version because later in time, the text was enlarged by additions and was matched in style to the Mahabharata.

The origin of this appendix is not precisely known but it is apparent that it was a part of the Mahabharata by the 1st century CE because "the poet Ashvaghosha quotes a couple of verses, attributing them to the Mahabharata, which are now only found in the Harivamsa."

Sivaprasad Bhattacharyya, also considered that Ashvaghosha referred to the Harivamsa, and found internal and external evidence that it was an authoritative text by the first century CE and that its later redaction took place around the end of the second or beginning of the third century CE.

Edward Washburn Hopkins considered the Mahabharata increased by the addition of the Harivamsa c. 200 CE, but also the possible existence of Harivamsa as part of the around hundred thousand verses within the Mahabharata as it can be attested in the Southern recension of the latter.

R. C. Hazra has dated the Purana to the 4th century CE on the basis of the description of the rasa lila in it, as according to him, the Vishnu Purana and the Bhagavata Purana belong to the 5th century CE and 6th century CE respectively. According to Dikshit, the date of the Matsya Purana is 3rd century CE. When we compare the biography of Krishna, the account of Raji, and some other episodes as depicted in the Harivaṃśa, it appears to be anterior to the former. Therefore, the Viṣṇu parva and the Bhaviṣya parva can be dated to at least the 3rd century CE.

J. L. Masson and D. H. H. Ingalls regard the language of Harivamsa not later than 2nd or 3rd century CE and possibly from the 1st century CE; and André Couture that Mathura's description in Harivamsa is similar to cities of Kushana period (1st to mid-3rd century CE).

By its style and contents, the Harivaṃśa's Adi parva appears to be anterior to the Viṣṇu parva and Bhaviṣya parva. The verses quoted by Ashvaghosa belong to this parva. On this basis, we can safely assume the Harivaṃśa parva (except for the later interpolations) to be at least as old as the 1st century CE.

== Editions ==
The Harivamśa is available in three editions. The vulgate text of the Harivamśa has total 271 adhyāyas (chapters), divided into three parvas, Harivaṃśa parva (55 chapters), Viṣṇu parva (81 chapters) and Bhaviṣya parva (135 chapters). The traditional edition contains 12000 shlokas (verses) 2 sub-parvas, the Harivamsa Parva (187 chapters) and the Bhavishya Parva (48 chapters) with a total of 235 chapters. The Critical Edition or CE (1969–71, Ed. P.L. Vaidya), estimated to be c. 300 Common Era by Vaidya, is around a third (118 chapters in 6073 slokas) of this vulgate edition. Like the vulgate, the chapters in the CE are divided into three parvas, Harivaṃśa parva (chapters 1-45), Viṣṇu parva (chapters 46-113) and Bhaviṣya parva (chapters 114 -118). Vaidya suggests that even the CE represents an expanded text and proposes that the oldest form of Harivamśa probably began with chapter 20 (which is where Agni Purana 12 places its start) and must have ended with chapter 98 of his text. The Bharata Bhava Deepa commentary on Mahabharata by Neelakantha Chaturdhara also covers the Harivamsa.

== Translations ==
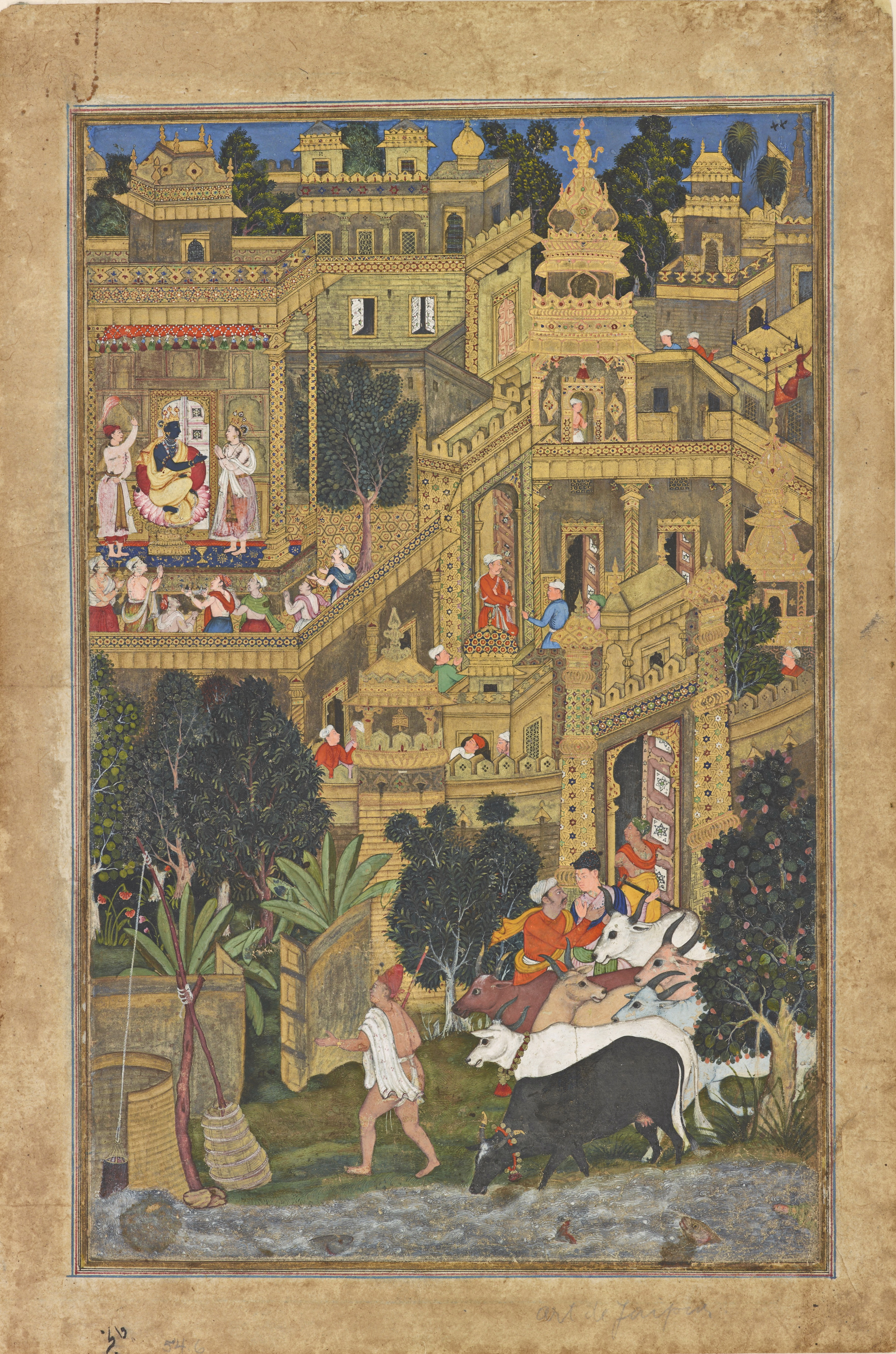
City of Dwarka in Harivamsa, as painted for the Mughal emperor Akbar

The Harivamsa has been translated in many Indian vernacular languages; The vulgate version containing 3 books and 271 chapters has not been translated into English yet. The only English translation of the traditional version containing 3 sub-parvas—Harivamsa parva (55 chapters), Vrishnu parva (131 chapters), and Bhavishya parva (49 chapters) for a total of 235 chapters—is by Manmatha Nath Dutt in 1897 and it is in the public domain. The critical edition has been translated into English twice so far, once in 2016 by the late economist Bibek Debroy and in 2019 by Simon Brodbeck.

It has been translated into French by M. A. Langlois, 1834–35.

== See also ==
- First book of Mahabharata: Adi Parva
- Previous book of Mahabharata: Svargarohana Parva
