= Kala pani (taboo) =

Hindu religious prohibition

The Kala Pani (lit. black water) represents the proscription of the over reaching seas in Hinduism. According to this prohibition, crossing the seas to foreign lands causes the loss of one's social respectability, as well as the putrefaction of one's cultural character and posterity.

== History ==
The offence of crossing the sea is also known as "Samudrolanghana" or "Sagarollanghana". The Dharma Sutra of Baudhayana (II.1.2.2) lists sea voyages as first of the offences that cause the loss of varna. The Dharma Sutra suggests a person can wipe away this offence in three years by eating little at every fourth meal time; bathing at dawn, noon and dusk; standing during the day; and sitting during the night.

In Shastra literature sea voyage was generally considered a "marginal issue" and is one of many actions that result in the loss of varṇa. Sea voyage is considered polluting due to the eating of forbidden food and for involving close interactions with non-Hindus ("mlecchasamparka"). The Shastras are not uniform in their injunction against the practice (some permit it under certain conditions) and the expiation is also variable.

An associated notion was that crossing the ocean entailed the end of the reincarnation cycle, as the traveller was cut off from the regenerating waters of the Ganges. Such voyages also meant breaking family and social ties. According to another belief in the pre-modern India, the Kala Pani (sea water) was inhabited by the houglis, bad spirits and monsters.

Similar anti-maritime attitudes could be found throughout the Indo-Mediterranean in pre-medieval times. The rise of Islam from the 7th century onward attracted various communities involved in maritime trade throughout the region; for example, the maritime traders of Malabar, treated as lowest-caste Hindus, rapidly Islamised and were thus looked down upon.

The 13th century Venetian explorer, Marco Polo, would note in his travelogue, for Malabar:

"They are very strict in executing justice upon criminals, and as strict in abstaining from wine. Indeed they have made a rule that wine-drinkers and seafaring men are never to be accepted as sureties. For they say that to be a seafaring man is all the same as to be an utter desperado, and that his testimony is good for nothing."

— "The Travels of Marco Polo, ch:17 Province of Malabar"

During the Portuguese Age of Exploration, Portuguese sailors noted that Hindus were reluctant to engage in maritime trade due to the kala pani proscription. In the eighteenth century, the banias of North India even considered the crossing of the Indus River at Attock to be prohibited, and underwent purification rituals upon their return. However, not all Hindus adhered to the proscription, so as to gain monetary wealth. For instance, Hindu merchants were present in Burma, Muscat, and other places around Asia and Africa. The Chola Empire under Rajendra I was also renowned for conducting maritime trade across Southeast Asia.

== British period ==
=== Mutinies ===
The East India Company recruited several upper-caste sepoys, and adapted its military practices to the requirements of their religious rituals. Consequently, the overseas service, considered polluting to their caste, was not required of them.

During the First Anglo-Burmese War (1824–26), the Bengal Army was ordered to go to Chittagong. Since no bullock carts were available and since sea voyage was a taboo, the Indian soldiers were asked to march to Chittagong by land. The soldiers were concerned about the difficulty involved in a land march, and were also afraid that their superiors might force them to take a sea voyage if the march failed. As a result of these fears, the 47th Regiment refused to march. This resulted in a mutiny on 2 November 1824 at Barrackpore.

The General Service Enlistment Act of 1856 required the new recruits to serve overseas if asked. The serving high-caste sepoys were fearful that this requirement would be eventually extended to them. Thus, the Hindu soldiers viewed the Act as a potential threat to their faith. The resulting discontent was one of the causes of the Indian rebellion of 1857.

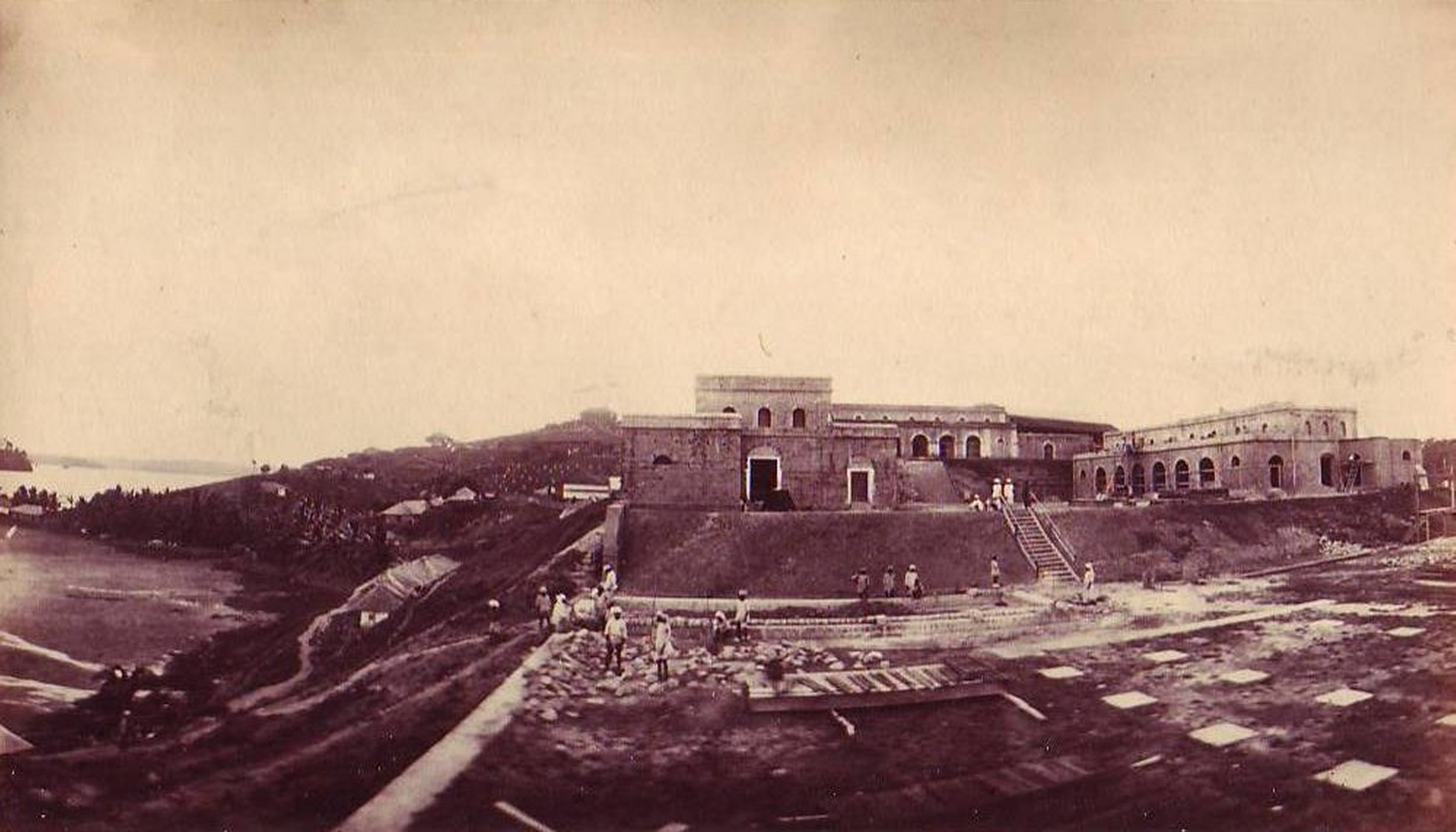
The Cellular Jail was known as Kala Pani, as the overseas journey to the Andaman islands threatened the convicts with the loss of caste, resulting in social exclusion.

Cellular Jail, the British Indian prison on the Andaman and Nicobar Islands was known as Kala Pani: an incarceration in this jail threatened the convicts with the loss of caste and the resulting social exclusion.

=== Indentured labourer diaspora ===
When slavery was abolished in British colonies (such as Mauritius in 1834), the authorities looked for indentured labour to replace the slaves who had been emancipated. The emissaries sent to India for this purpose were astute in attracting so-called "coolies" to the countries such as South Africa, Mauritius, Fiji and the Caribbean that required cheap labour, which were often presented as "promised lands." But many prospective candidates for the distant colonies expressed their fears of crossing the Kala Pani. So the British often employed a stratagem to dispel the doubts of the indentured: they placed water from the Ganges in large cauldrons on the ships, to ensure the continuity of reincarnation beyond the Kala Pani. The sea voyage was then seen as less fearsome.

The Kala Pani theme features prominently in Indo-Caribbean history, and has been elaborately discussed in the writings of V. S. Naipaul. Mauritian poet and critic Khal Torabully, who is partly of Indo-Mauritian descent, describes the Kala Pani as a source not only of the dissolution of identity, but also of beauty and reconstruction, leading to what he terms a "coral imaginary." Indo-Guyanese poet Shana Yardan also discussed this cultural issue in her work.

== Modern India ==
The Tirupati Temple does not allow a priest who has crossed the seas to enter the temple's sanctum sanctorum.

In 2007, the ascension of Sugunendra Tirtha to the Udupi Krishna Temple was opposed by some seers, because he had visited foreign countries, thus committing the offence of saagarolanga (crossing the sea). In 2008, a court verdict formally allowed his ascension. In 2012, both he and his opponent Vishwesha Teertha announced fasts to pressure each other on the issue.

Vishnunarayanan Namboothiri, a noted poet who served as a priest at the Sreevallabha Temple, was not allowed to enter the temple after he returned from an overseas trip to London. The temple authorities, led by the thantri (chief priest), asked him to undergo a thorough cleansing, penance and punaravrodha (reinstallation) before he would be allowed in again. Namboothiri was asked to purify himself by reciting the Gayatri Mantra 1,008 times, which he refused to do. The Rashtriya Swayamsevak Sangh supported him, calling the taboo an "outdated ritual". The Travancore Devaswom Board also supported him, and fired two of its officials for refusing to support his reinstatement. After the board served the thantri a show-cause notice, Namboothiri was allowed back after purification by sprinkling of holy water (theertham).

== List of people affected by Kala pani ==
List of notable people who were expelled from their caste for travelling across the seas.

- Mahipatram Rupram Nilkanth
- Karsandas Mulji
- Motilal Nehru
- Mahatma Gandhi
- Tanguturi Prakasam
- Shankarlal Banker
