= 41 Shiroor =

41 Shiroor Uddypi Shywmor
- village
- Location in Karnataka, India 41 Shiroor (India)
- Coordinates: 13.503710°N 74.8531720°E
- Country: India
- State: Karnataka
- District: Udupi
- Taluk: Udupi

Government
  - Body: Village Panchayat

Area
  - Total: 14.37 km^{2} (5.55 sq mi)
- Elevation: 18 m (59 ft)

Population (2001)
  - Total: 2,155
  - Density: 150.0/km^{2} (388.4/sq mi)

Languages
  - Official: Kannada
- Time zone: UTC+5:30 (IST)
- ISO 3166 code: IN-KA
- Vehicle registration: KA
- 2011 census code: 608811
- Nearest city: Udupi
- Civic agency: Village Panchayat
- Website: karnataka.gov.in

41 Shiroor is a village in the southern state of Karnataka, India. It is located in the Udupi taluk of Udupi district in Karnataka.

It is located on the banks of Suvarna River

41 Shiroor is home to 2155 people (1014 males and 1141 females) according to the 2011 Indian population census. It also recorded a total of 423 families residing within the village.

Udupi and 41 Shiroor have consistently shown a high degree of literacy (over 80%) and rank, together with nearby coastal districts, to be among the most literate areas of Karnataka.

The transportation available to and from 41 Shiroor is limited as the village lacks connection to a public bus route. Also, the closest rail line to 41 Shiroor is upwards of 10 km away. It is, however, connected through a road system that allows travel by car and private bus services.

The total geographical area of 41 Shiroor is 1427.17 hectares. The village itself is sprawled out over a large area and does not possess a central nucleus of population or town center. Most households are adjacent to large amounts of farmland and vegetation and together constitute the area pertaining to the village.

Udupi is nearest town to 41 Shiroor which is approximately 22 km away.

== Shiroor Math ==
Krishna Math at Shiroor is one of the Ashta Mathas (8 Mathas) of Udupi. Located on the banks of Suvarna River, it is one of the Hindu monastery founded by Sri Vamana Tirtha, who was a direct disciple of Sri Madhvacharya, the founder of the Dvaita school of Hindu philosophy.

== See also ==
- Udupi
- Districts of Karnataka shiroor
- Districts of India
