= Vishnu Tirtha =

Scholar of the Dvaita school of Vedanta philosophy

Personal life
- Born: Subhaktimana Pājaka, Udupi, Karnataka, India

Religious life
- Religion: Hinduism
- Philosophy: Tattvavāda

Religious career
- Teacher: Madhvacharya

Vishnu Tirtha (Subhaktiman) is a scholar of the Dvaita school of Vedanta philosophy and the founder of the monasteries at Sodhe and Subramanya. He left his home after his parents died to join the order of Brahma Sampradaya. He was initiated into the order by his older brother Madhvacharya (1238–1317 CE), the founder of the Dvaita school. Subhaktiman was renamed Vishnu Tirtha after the initiation. He was succeeded by Aniruddha Tirtha at the Subramanya monastery. He also had an elder sister.

== See also ==
- Vadiraja swamy
- Paryaya
