= Puttige Matha =

Madhwa Vaishnava monastery

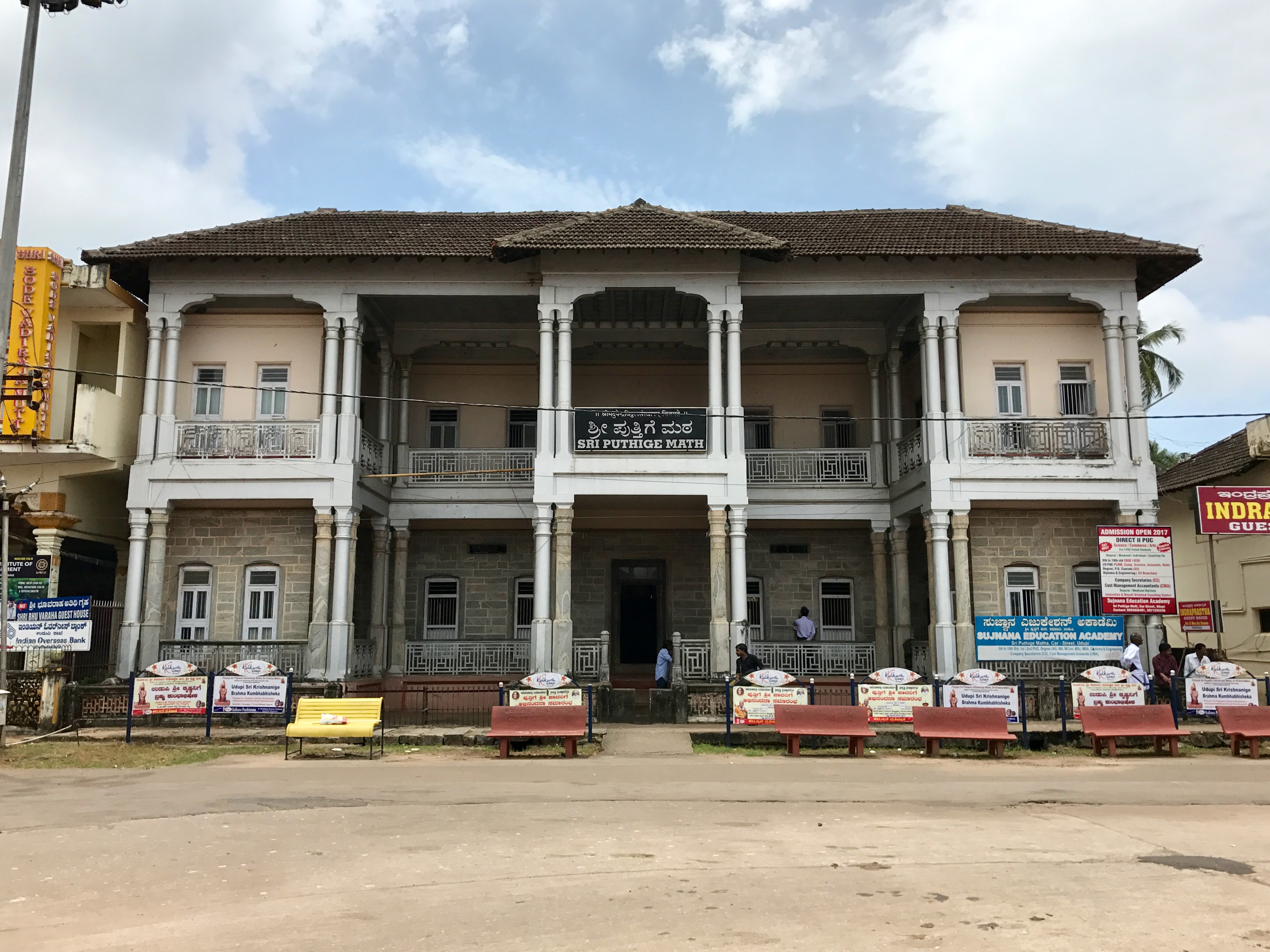
- Entrance in Rathabeedi, Udupi

People
- Founder: Madhvacharya

Site
- Location: Puthige, Dakshina Kannada
- Website: www.shriputhige.org

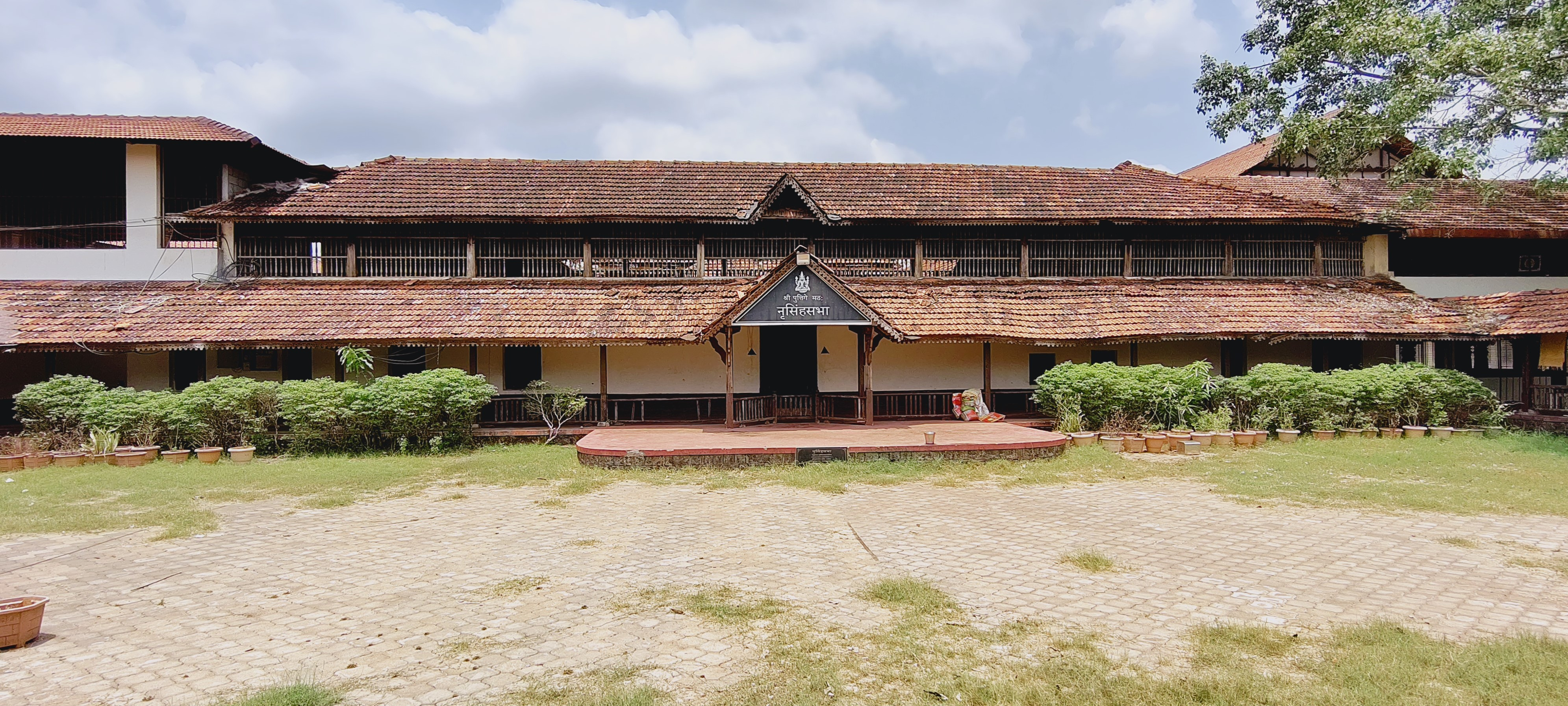
Moola matha of Puthige, located near hiriyadka, Udupi district

Puthige Matha (Kannada: ಪುತ್ತಿಗೆ ಮಠ) or Puttige Mutt in some records and literature is a Madhwa Vaishnava monastery. It is one of the Ashta Mathas of Udupi founded by Dvaita philosopher Madhvacharya of Udupi. The first pontiff of Puttige matha was Sri Upendra Tirtha, who was a direct disciple of Sri Madhvacharya, the founder of the Dvaita school of philosophy. The main idols worshipped in the Puttige matha are that of Panduranga (Vittala), which was given to Sri Upendra Tirtha by Sri Madhvacharya. Till date, there have been 29 pontiffs who have headed the matha.

The current Swamiji of the matha is Shri Sugunendra Tirtha Swamiji

== The Lineage of Swamiji's (guru parampara) ==
1. Upendra Tirtha-Sri Madhwavijaya mentions a story of Sri Upendra teeertha. Sri Madhva undertook a second trip to Badari. On the way, many interesting incidents took place. Once, after Sri Madhva and his followers crossed the Ganga river, the troops of a Muslim ruler arrested all of them. Sri Madhva explained to the King that it was the same Supreme Being that all people on earth worshipped and therefore he feared none. Looking at the fearless saint and impressed by his words, the King offered many gifts to Sri Madhva (all of which were politely refused) and permitted them to leave. On another occasion, a band of dacoits attacked the party. Sri Madhva asked Upendra Tirtha, his disciple, to confront them. Sri Upendra Tirtha, who went on to become one of the eight disciples who got the opportunity of worshipping Sri Krishna at Udupi, and who is the founder of the Puttige Matha, fought like a man possessed and drove away the bandits.
2. Kavindra Tirtha
3. Hamsendra Tirtha
4. Yadavendra Tirtha
5. Dharanidhara Tirtha
6. Damodara Tirtha
7. Raghunatha Tirtha
8. Shreevatsanka Tirtha
9. Gopinatha Tirtha
10. Ranganatha Tirtha
11. Lokanatha Tirtha
12. Ramanatha Tirtha-
13. Shreevallabha Tirtha-
14. Shreenivasa Tirtha- Puthige mutt guruparampara shloka describes him as "Vadiraja munisupriyam". His disciple's Shreenidheeya tippani on Nyaayasudha describes that his Vidyaguru had Narasimha's grace.
15. Shreenidhi Tirtha-He has written commentary on nyaaya sudha written by jayateertha
16. Gunanidhi Tirtha
17. Anandanidhi Tirtha
18. Taponidhi Tirtha
19. Yadavendra Tirtha
20. Kavindra Tirtha- There were two pillars opposite to each other on which a lion and an elephant was carved. The villagers of puthige village were in trouble.
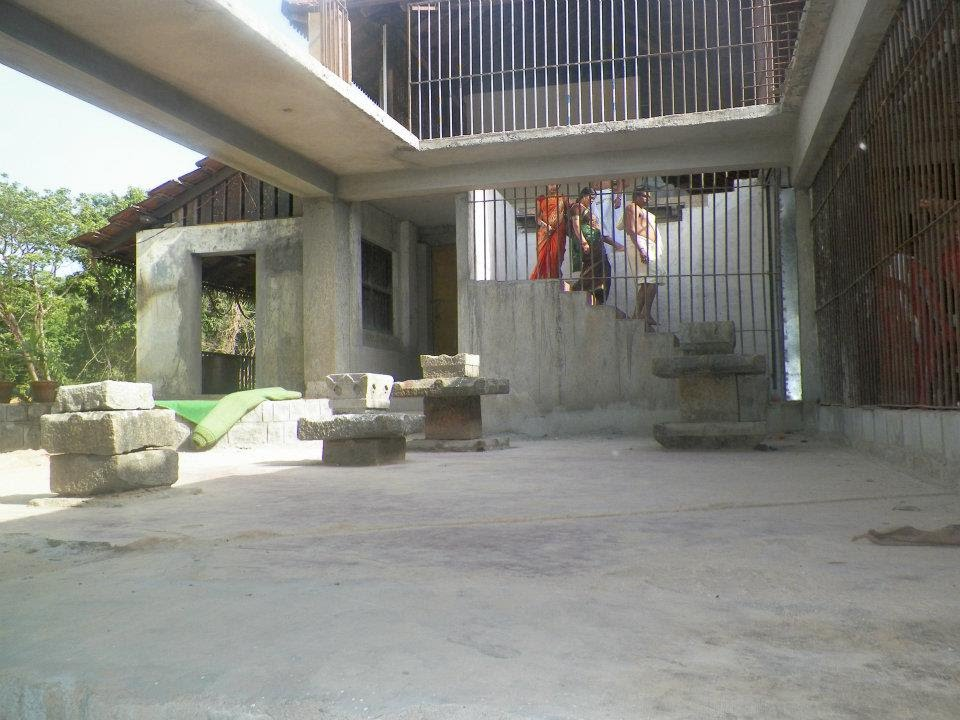
  Brindavana of Puttige Matha
  Lord Ganesha came out of the pillar on which elephant was carved hearing to prayers of Kavindra teertha.
21. Raghavendra Tirtha-He laid steps for Madhvasarovara in Udupi Sri Krishna Mutt. His brindavana is in Hiriyadka, Puthige. Lakshmidhara teertha of Shiroor mutt was his brother in poorvashrama.
22. Vibudhendra Tirtha
23. Surendra Tirtha
24. Bhuvanendra Tirtha-His brindavana is at Kuruvalli in teerthahalli. He has been mentioned in Vishvapriyavilaasa written by kochi rangappacharya. He had done sudha mangala for 12 times.
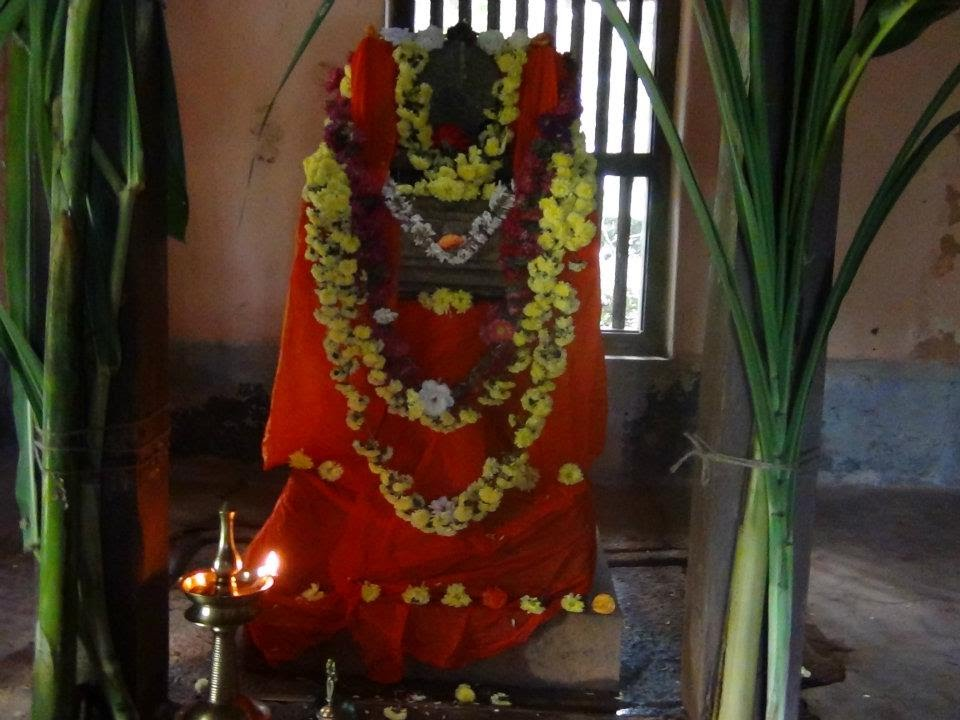
  BHUVANENDRA TEERTHA, PUTHIGE MATHA
  He renovated Ananteshvara temple in Udupi. He had many sanyasi shishyaru like Yogindra teertharu of puthige mutt, Vidyadheesha teertharu of Krishnapura mutt, Rajendra yatigalu, etc.
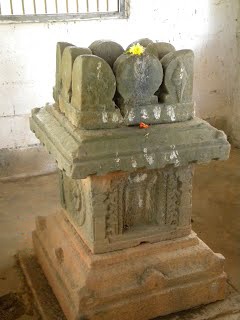
  Rajendra Yati Vrindavana
  of his Panditya, puthige matha got jahgeer at Teerthahalli. His disciple Rajendra yatigaLu entered brindavana before Bhuvanendra Tirtha. So he gave ashrama to Yogindra teertha.
25. Yogindra Tirtha
26. Sumatindra Tirtha
27. Shatayushi Sudhindra tirtha- Sri Sudheendra Teertha took ashrama from Sri Vidyadheesha Teertha of Krishnapura Mutt and ruled the peetha for 79 years. He was born in the year 1856 at Hejamadi Village belonging to Shukla Yajurveda Shakha. He took Sanyasa in 1878. He got his initial education under Sri Vidyadheesha Teertha of Krishnapura Mutt and later studied sudha and other higher education under Sri Lakshmivallabha Teertha of Shiroor Mutt.
28. Sujnanendra teertha
29. Sugunendra Tirtha (Present Pitadhipathi)
30. Sushreendra Tirtha (Junior Pontiff)

== Branches & Temples Managed by Shri Puthige Matha ==
1. Shri Puthige Vidyapeetha, Hiriyadka, Udupi.
2. Shri Puthige Matha, Car Street, Udupi.
3. Shri Puthige Vidyapeetha, Paadigar, Udupi.
4. Shri Puthige Matha, Theerthahalli.
5. Shri Govardhanagiri Kshetra, Basavanagudi, Bengaluru.
6. Vishnumurthy Temple, Hiriyadka, Udupi.
7. Anantheshwara Chandreshwara Temple, Car Street, Udupi.
8. Gourishankara Temple, Theerthahalli.
9. Shri Mahalingeshwara Temple, Hejamadi
10. Vishnumurthy Temple, Karamballi, Udupi.
11. Ananthapadmanabha Temple, Paniyadi, Udupi.
12. Shri Guru Raghavendra Matha, old Sagara road,shimoga dist, Hosanagara.
13. Vittala Anjeneya Raghavendra Matha, Habbuvada, Karwar.
14. Shri Karaanjaneya Swamiji Matha, Mailapur, Chennai.
15. Raghavendra Swami Matha, Darmapuri, Tamil Nadu.
16. Shri Krishna Hanuman Gurusarva Bhouma Sannidhi, Kolkata.
17. Subramanya Raghavendra Swami Matha, Taamram, Chennai.
18. Kemmundel Primary School, Udupi.
19. Udupi puthige matha, 49/A, pratapaditya road, Kolkata, West Bengal, kolkata.
20. Sri Raghavendra Swami matha Udupi, sri puthige matha, no.2 Virupakshapuram, Dharmapuri, tamilnadu.
