= Pejavara =

- village
- Location in Karnataka, India Pejavara (India)
- Coordinates: 12.9559°N 74.8486°E
- Country: India
- State: Karnataka
- District: Dakshina Kannada

Languages
  - Official: Kannada
- Time zone: UTC+5:30 (IST)

Pejavara or Pejawara is a village located in the Mangalore taluk of Dakshina Kannada, formerly known as South Canara or South Kanara, district of Karnataka, India. It houses one of the eight ashta mathas established by Madhvacharya, the great Tattvavāda philosopher. It also houses a branch of the Krishnapura matha known as Mudai or Moodai Matha, another of the Ashta Mathas of Udupi founded by Dvaita philosopher Shri Madhvacharya. The region is known as Tulunadu/Tulunad. Pejavara is very close to the Thokur railway station on the Mumbai-Mangalore Konkan railway route. Also Jokatte railway station is nearby.

== See also ==
- Pejavara Guru Parampara
