= Udupi Sri Krishna Matha =

Hindu temple

Shri Krishna Temple Udupi
- ಉಡುಪಿ ಶ್ರೀ ಕೃಷ್ಣ ದೇವಸ್ಥಾನ
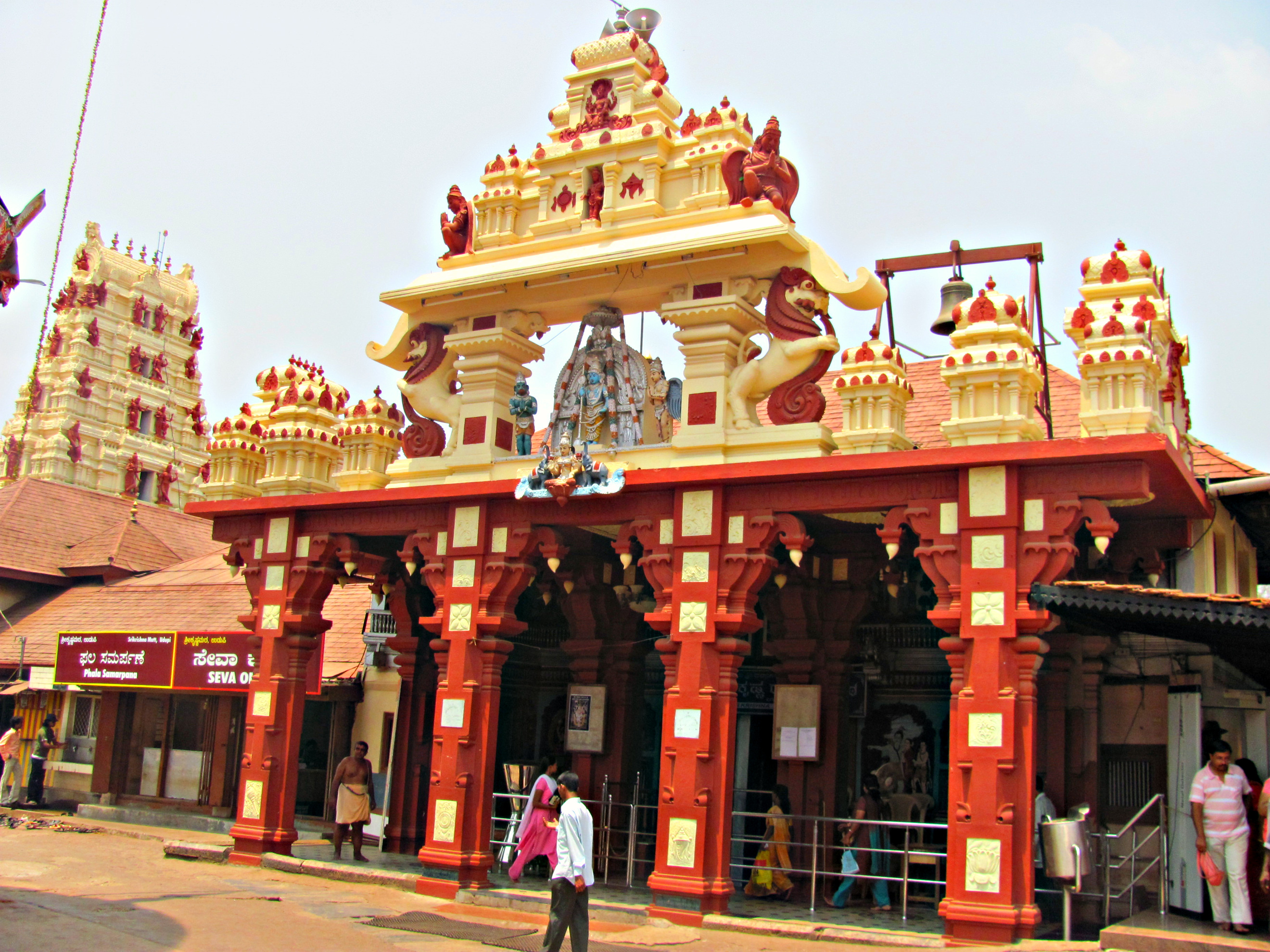
- The temple gates

- Location in Karnataka

Religion
- Affiliation: Hinduism
- Deity: Krishna

Location
- Location: Udupi
- State: Karnataka
- Country: India
- Coordinates: 13°19′56″N 74°44′46″E

Architecture
- Type: Kerala architecture
- Completed: 13th century CE

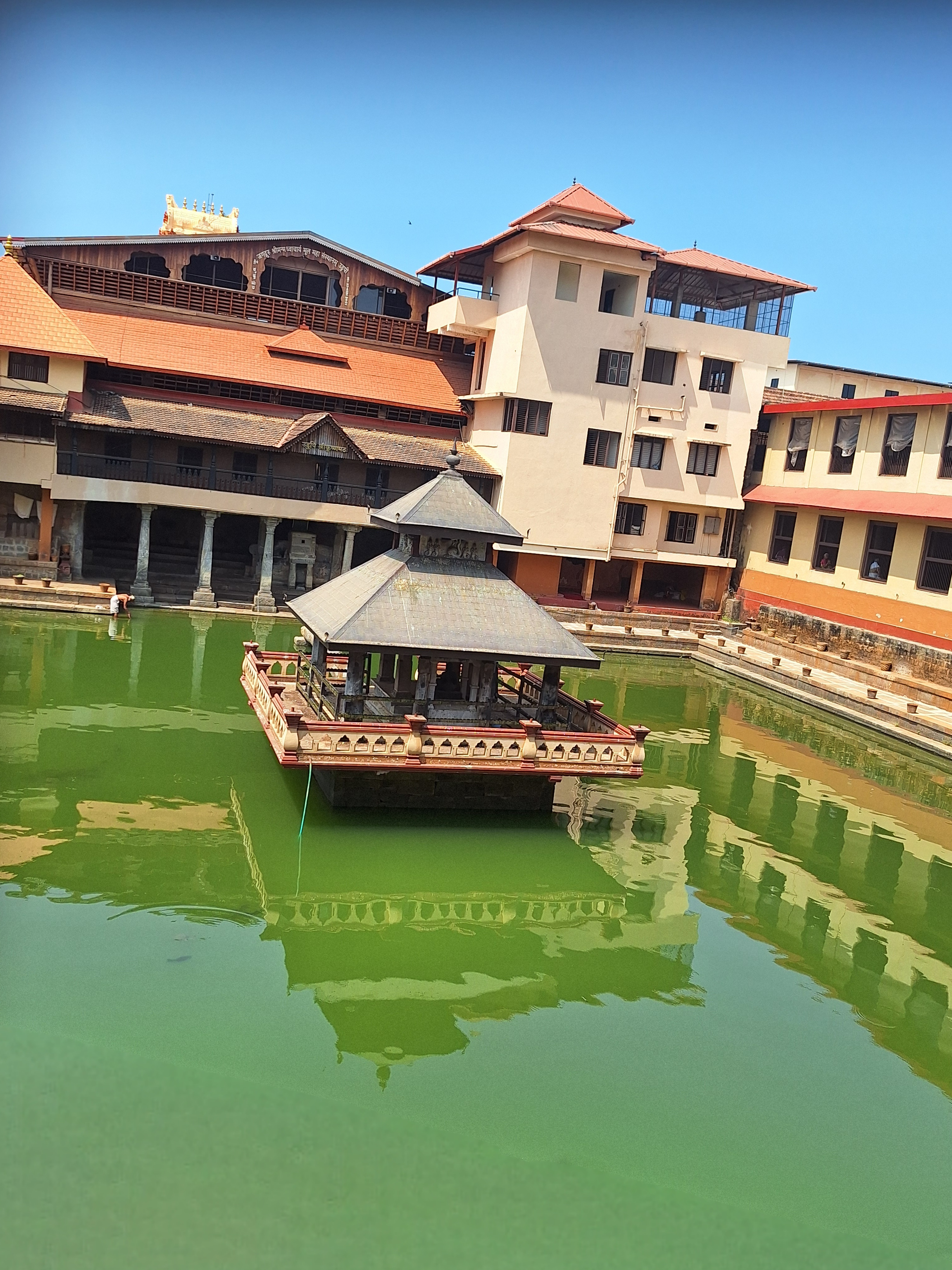
Shri Udupi Krishna Temple's Madhwa Sarovara view

Udupi Shri Krishna Temple is a well-known historic Hindu temple dedicated to Krishna and Dvaita Matha, located in the city of Udupi in Karnataka, India. The Matha area resembles a living ashram, a holy place for daily devotion and living. Surrounding the Shri Krishna Temple are several temples namely the Udupi Anantheshwara Temple which is over a thousand years old.

== History ==
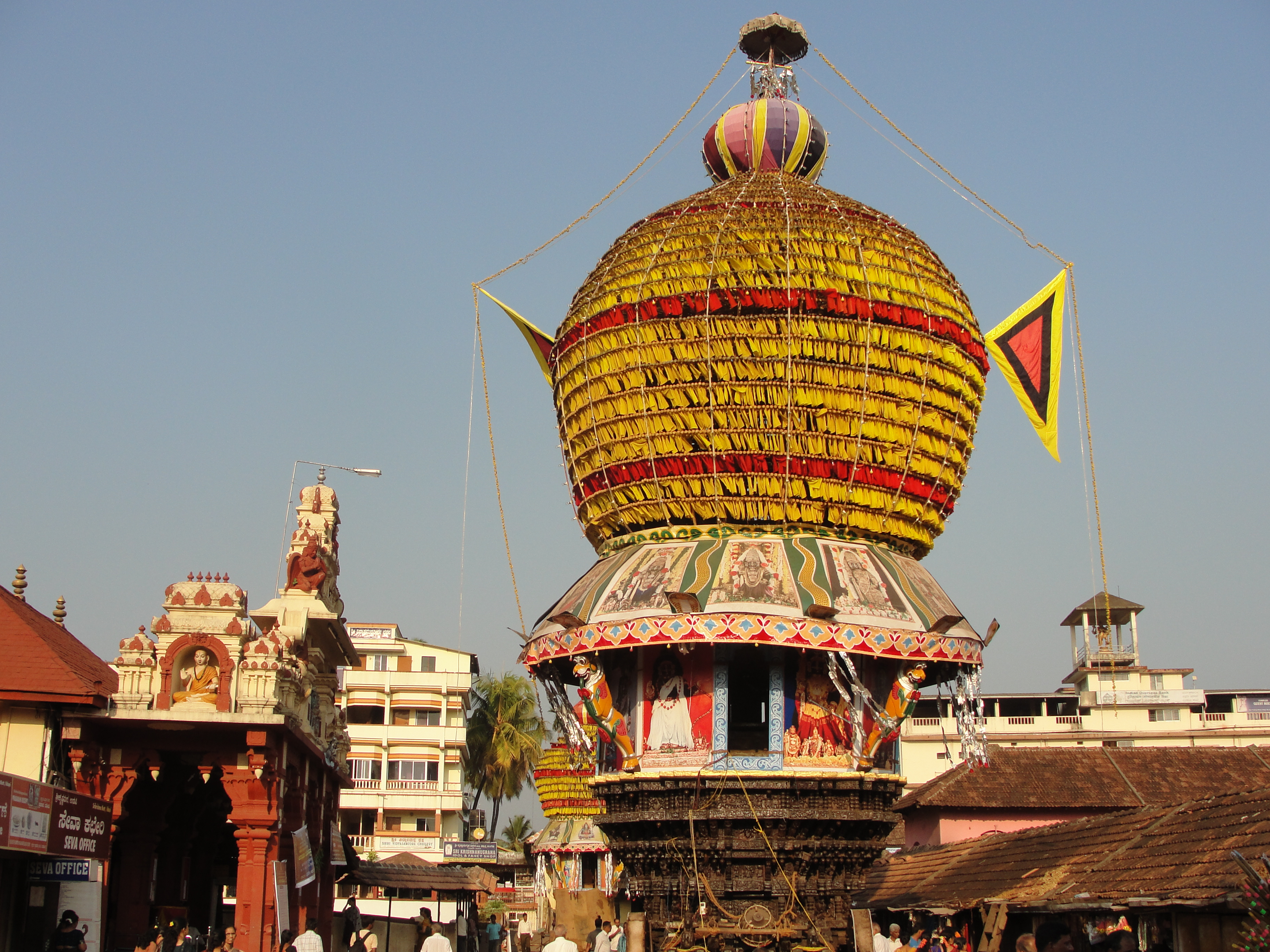
Chariot in front of the Sri Krishna Temple

The Krishna Matha was founded by the Vaishnavite saint Madhvacharya in the 13th century. He was the founder of the Dvaita school of Vedanta. It is believed that Madhvacharya found the vigraha of Krishna in a large ball of gopichandana. As per the temple folk story, the idol was originally placed towards the east. Due to intense devotion shown by Kanakadasa, the deity is said to have turned Pashchimabhimukha (facing west). All the other Vigrahas in other Ashta Mathas face west as well. Although historically speaking, the idol was always facing towards the west from the time when the temple was constructed in the 13th century as recorded in the Madhavacharya's own works and in other historical records. Historians mostly see the moving of idol as a folk story, developed centuries after the Kanakadasa's death. Devotees always have darshan of Krishna through the inner window, known as the Navagraha Kindi and the outer window known as the Kanakana Kindi, which is decorated by an arch named after the saint Kanakadasa. A statue has also been erected. A similar window covers the immediate front of the Vigraha and is called Navagraha Kindi. It is often mistaken to be the Kanakana Kindi.

The temple opens at 5:30 hours IST. The unique feature of the temple is that the deity is worshipped through a silver-plated window with nine holes (Navagraha Kindi). The temple also offers prasada at noon and is popularly called Anna Brahma as it feeds a vast number of devotees..

== Kanakana Kindi ==
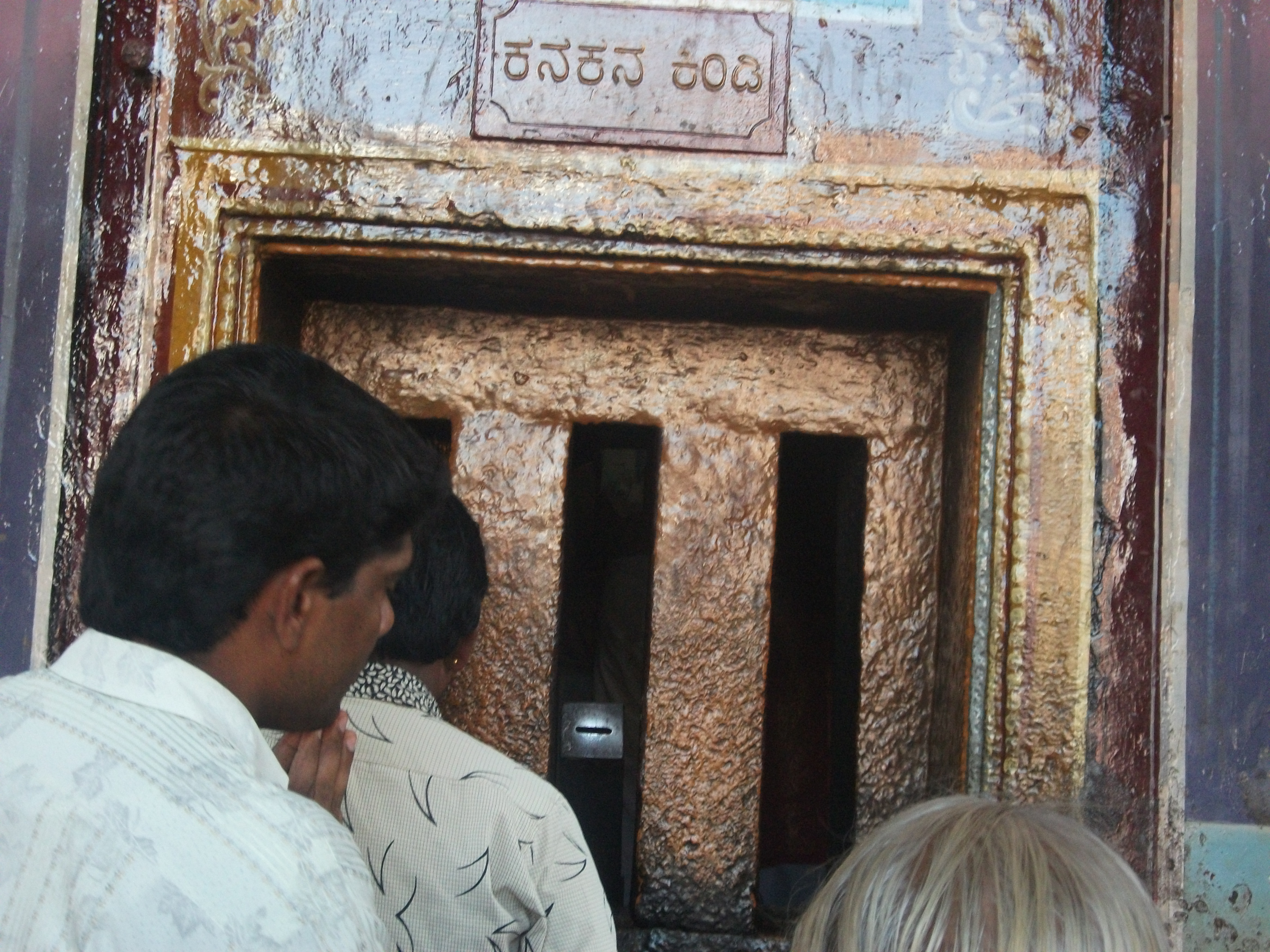
Kanakana Kindi in 2012

Kanakana Kindi, or Kanaka’s Window, is a small viewing aperture to the western wall of main temple hall where the devotee can have a glimpse (darshana) of the central idol (vigraha) of Lord Krishna. The legends link this kindi to Kanakadasa, a Haridasa saint in early modern India.

German scholar Hermann Friedrich Mogling documented the oral traditions about Kanakadasa in the 1860s, roughly 200 years after the events. The legends at that time were slightly different from the present day legend.

Kanakadasa was born Veera Nayaka an army chieftain of the Kuruba community in the Vijayanagara Kingdom. After losing a battle, Veera Nayaka became a dasa and devoted himself to singing devotional songs praising Krishna.

When Kanakadasa came to Udupi as a pilgrim, Sri Vadiraja Tirtha, the chief priest of the temple, arranged a roadside hut for him behind the temple. As a non-Brahmin, Kanakadasa was not allowed to enter the temple. He spent his time in the hut playing his tambura and singing, separated from the Krishna idol by the temple wall.

According to legend recorded by Mogling, Krishna's idol turned westward in response to Kanakadasa's devotion. During an earthquake one night, a crack appeared in the shrine wall, allowing Kanakadasa to see the idol. When Vadiraja learned about this, he widened the crack into a window rather than sealing it.

In addition, Mogling narrates the story of precious stones after the earthquake event. A few precious stones from the idol's necklace began disappearing. Vadiraja investigated and questioned Kanakadasa, who explained that Krishna had given him the stones to ease his hunger. A local goldsmith confirmed buying the stones from Kanakadasa for four-and-a-half varahas.

To demonstrate Kanakadasa's divine favour, Vadiraja entered the sanctum with closed fists and asked the temple priests what he held. None could answer. When he asked Kanakadasa, the devotee sang "Eetaneega Vasudevano," and Sri Vadiraja opened his hands to reveal a Saligrama stone. Impressed by the divine favour of Veera Nayaka, Vadiraja then formally renamed Veera Nayaka as "Kanakadasa".

== Krishna Matha ==
The daily sevas (offerings to god) and administration of the Krishna Mathas is managed by the Ashta Mathas (eight monasteries). Each of the Ashta Mathas performs temple management activities for two years in a cyclical order. They are collectively known as the 'Ashta Mathagalu' in Kannada. Each Ashta Matha has its own deity which is called Pattada Devaru.

The Krishna Matha is known for its religious customs, traditions and tenets of Dvaita or Tatvavada philosophy. It is also the center of Daasa Saahitya, a form of literature that originated in Udupi.

These eight Mathas are:

- Palimaru Matha
- Admaru Matha
- Krishnapura Matha
- Puttige
- Shirur Matha
- Sodhe Matha
- Kaniyoor Matha
- Pejavara

The expenses of Udupi Krishna Matha are borne by the voluntary contributions of the devotees and by the Ashta Mathas that manage the Krishna Matha. The contribution may be in cash or kind. The Krishna Matha, which owned large tracts of land, lost it all in 1975 due to the enactment of the Land Reforms Act 1975 by the Government of Karnataka.

The Pauli of Krishna Matha was renovated and the Brahmakalashotsava ceremony was held on 18 May 2017.

=== Daily Poojas (Pujas) performed at Shri Krishna Mutt,Udipi ===
Various Daily Pujas performed in the sacred presence of Lord Sri Krishna.Timings of all pooje and seva's are approximate and may vary.

1. Nirmalya visarjana Puja 5-00 a.m. 2. Ushakala Puja 6-00 a.m. 3. Akshya patra-Gopuja 6-15 a.m. 4. Vishwaroopa Darshana 6-20 a.m. 5. Panchamritabhisheka 6-30 a.m. 6. Udvartana Puja 7-00 a.m. 7. Kalasha Pooja 7-30 a.m. 8. Teertha Puja 7-40 a.m. 9. Alankara Puja 8-30 a.m. 10. Avasara Sanakadi Puja 10-30 a.m. 11. Mahapuja 11-00 a.m. 12. chamara Seva 7-00 p.m. 13. Ratri puja 7-30 p.m. 14. Ranga puje 7-40 p.m. 15. Utsava 8-00 p.m. 16. Thottilu Puja 8-30 p.m. 17. Kolalu Seva 8-40 p.m. 18. Ekanta Seva 8-50 p.m.

All above pujas are personally performed by the Pontiffs (Swamiji's) of the Ashta Mathas (Eight Mathas). The Krishna Matha at Ratha beedi (Car street), Udupi is open for Darshana from 5 O'clock in the morning to 9 O'clock in the night. For devotee's entering Krishna Temple dress code has been implemented from 19 January 2026.

=== Swamis of the Ashta Mathas ===
The Swamis of the Ashta Mathas and their successors are as follows.

Matha	Current Swaameejee	Successor or Junior
Pejavara	Shri Vishvaprasanna Teertha Swamiji	
Palimaru	Shri Vidyadeesha Teertha Swamiji	Shri Vidyarajeshwara Teertha Swamiji
Adamaru	Shri Vishvapriya Teertha Swamiji	Shri Eeshapriya Teertha Swamiji
Puttige	Shri Sugunendra Teertha Swamiji	Shri Sushreendra Teertha Swamiji
Sodhe	Shri Vishwavallabha Teertha Swamiji	
Kaniyooru	Shri Vidyavallabha Teertha Swamiji	
Shirur	Shri Vedavardhana Teertha Swamiji	
Krishnapura	Shri Vidyasagara Teertha Swamiji	

== Festivals ==
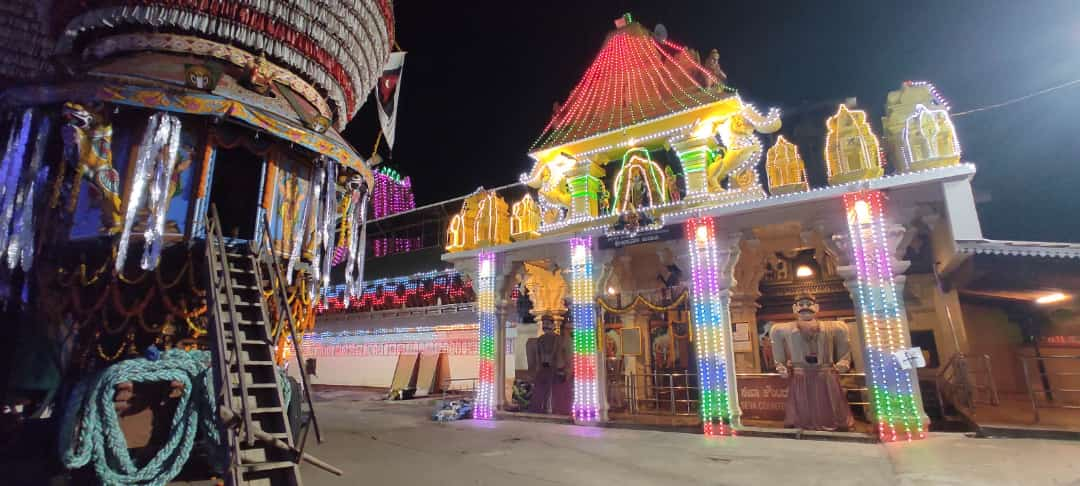
Sri Krishna Matha during Paryaya festival January 2022

During the Paryaya festival, held once every two years, the temple management is handed over to the next Ashta Matha, which has been entrusted the responsibility of running the temple turn by turn. Each of the Mathas is headed by a swami, who will be in charge of the temple during his Paryaya. The Paryaya is held on even years The Paryaya tradition has completed 500 years as of 2021. Presently, Puttige Matha is administering the temple with Junior Pontiff Shri Sushreendra Teertha Swamiji ascending the post of Sarvajna or Paryaya Peetha. Festivals like Makara Sankranthi, Ratha Sapthami, Madhva Navami, Hanuman Jayanthi, Sri Krishna Janmashtami, Navarathi Mahotsava, Madhva Jayanti, Vijaya Dashami, Naraka Chathurdashi, Deepavali, and Geetha Jayanthi are celebrated by Paryaya Mutt every year.

== Gallery ==
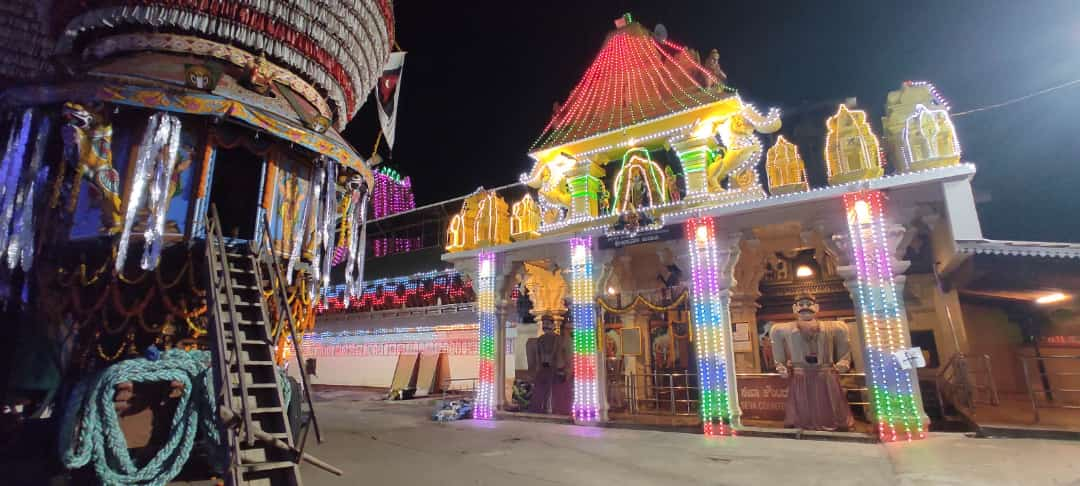
Sri Krishna Matha during Paryaya festival January 2022

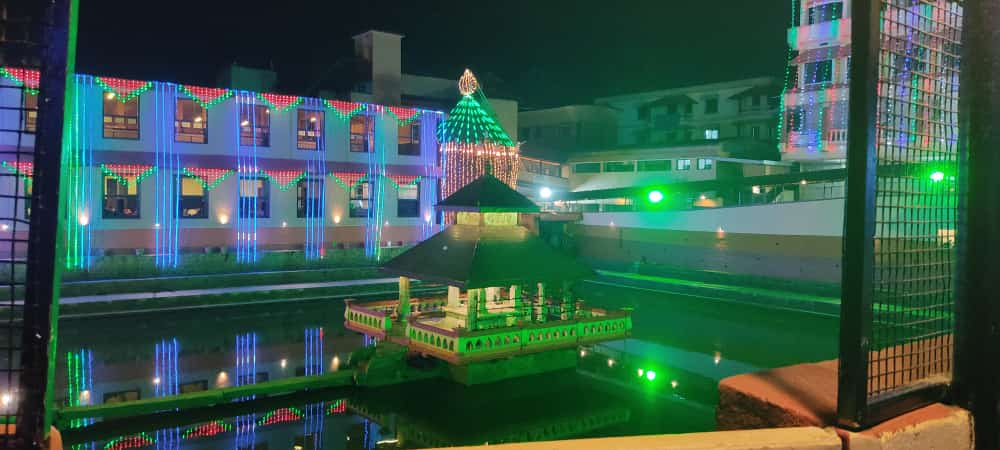

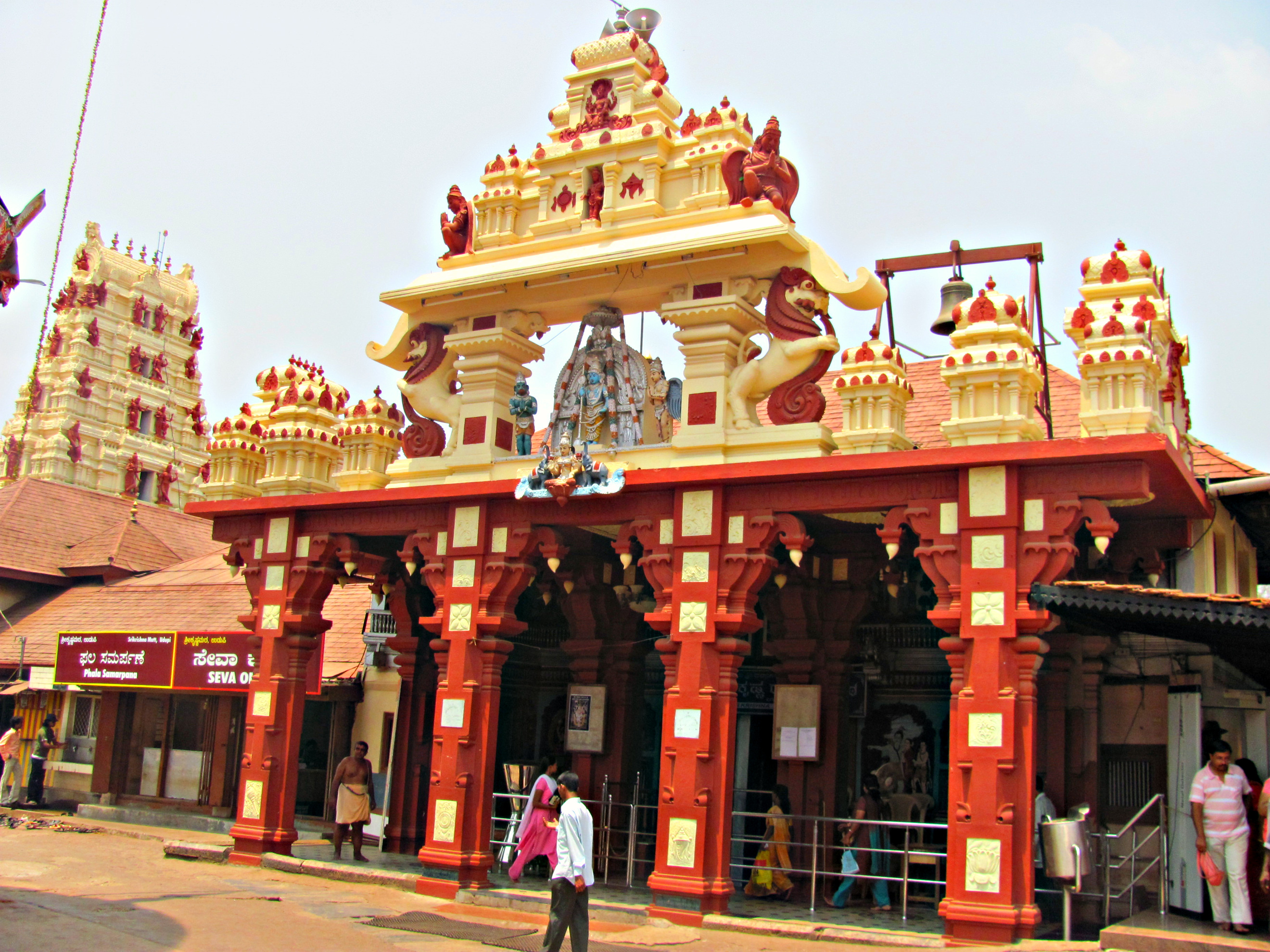
Temple painted in yellow-red

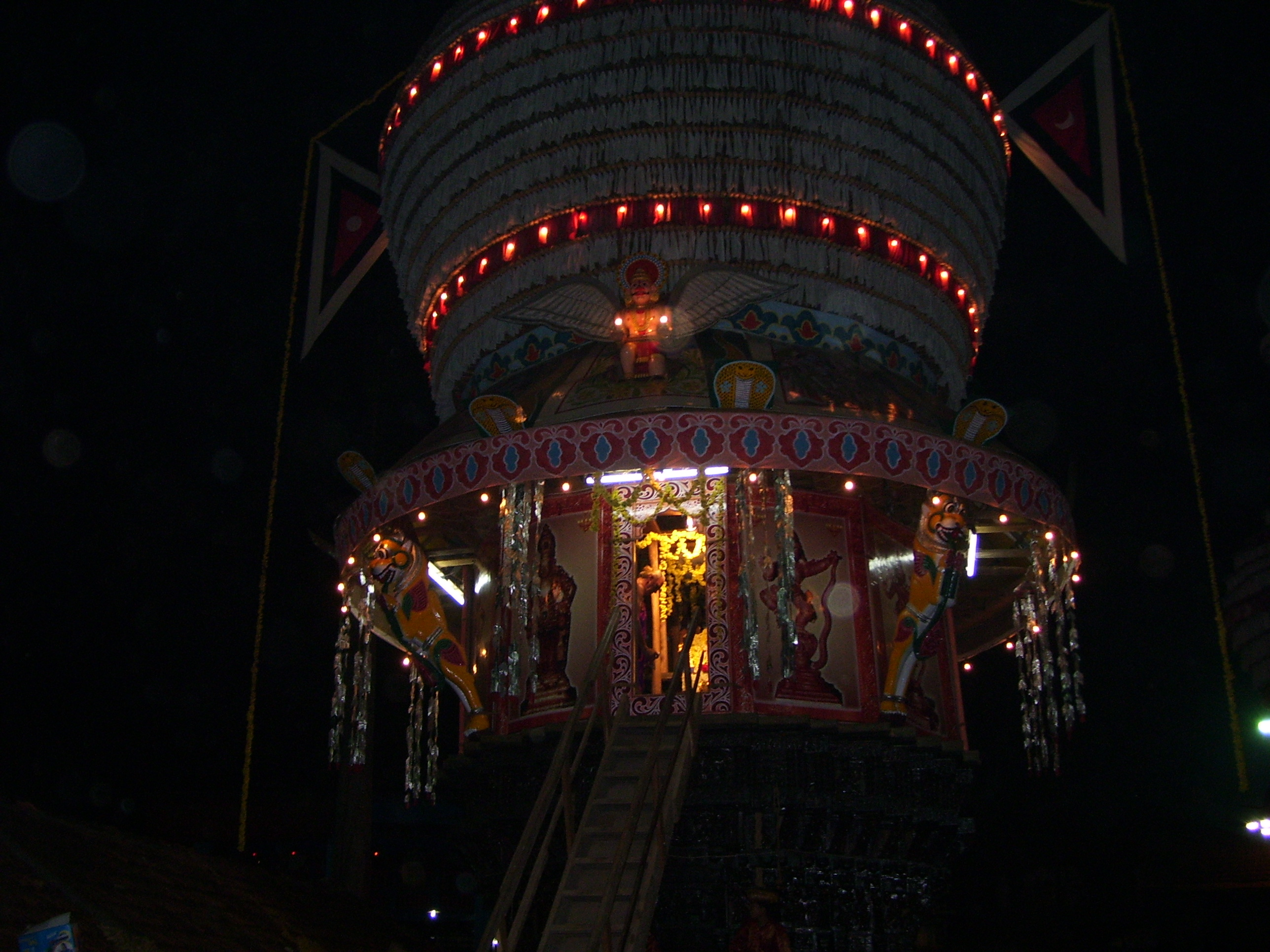
Brahma ratha of Udupi Krishna

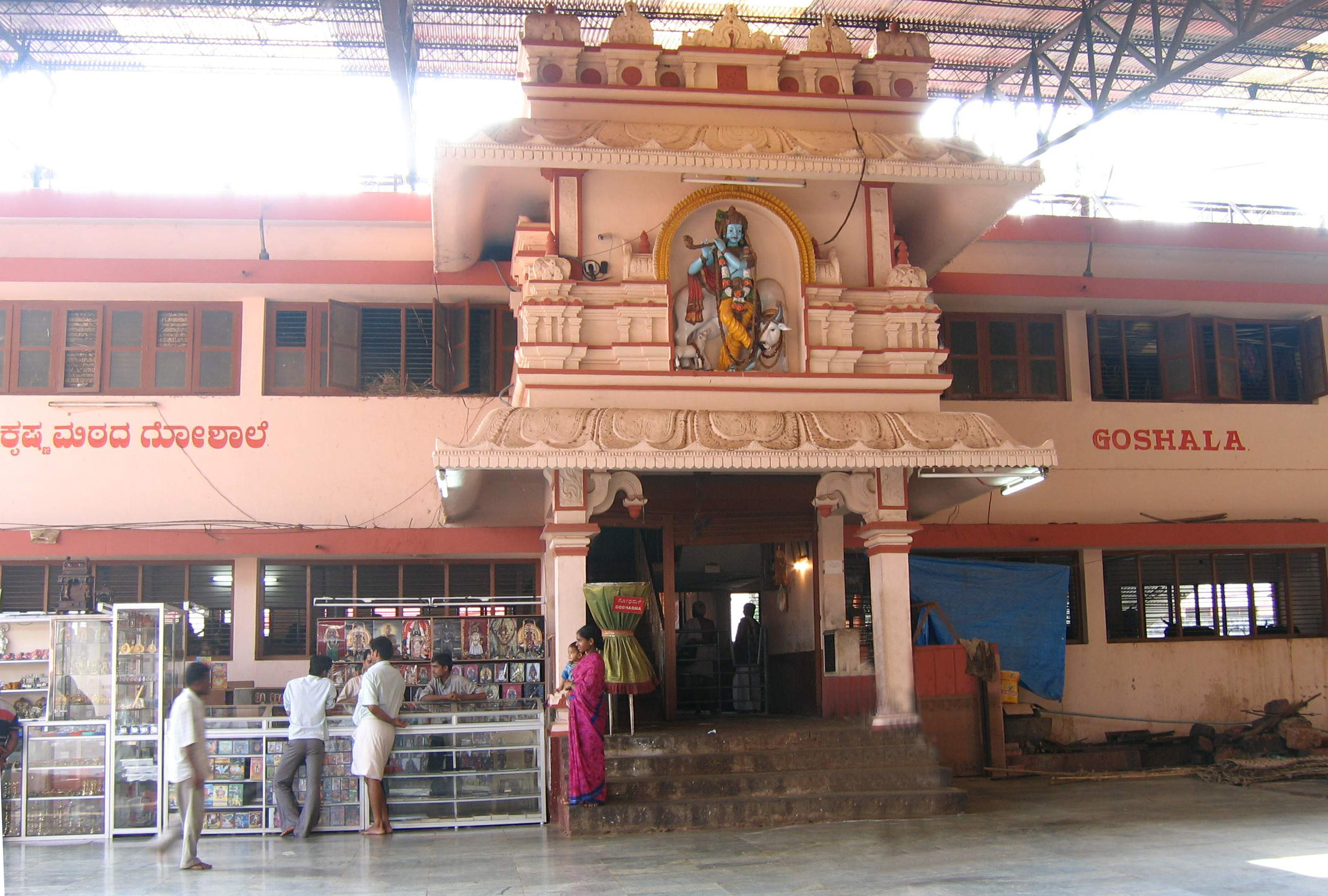
Goshala at Udupi Sri Krishna Temple

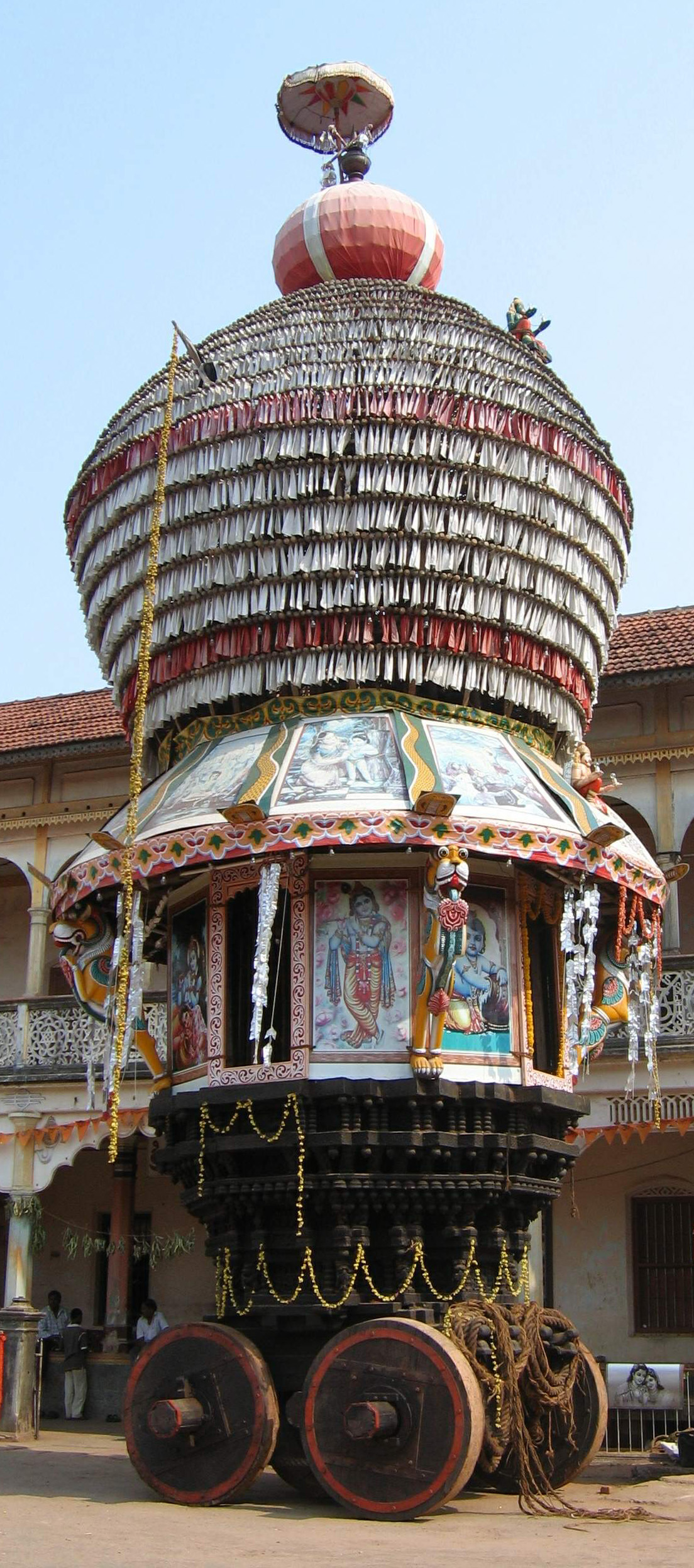
The Chariot at Udupi Sri Krishna Temple

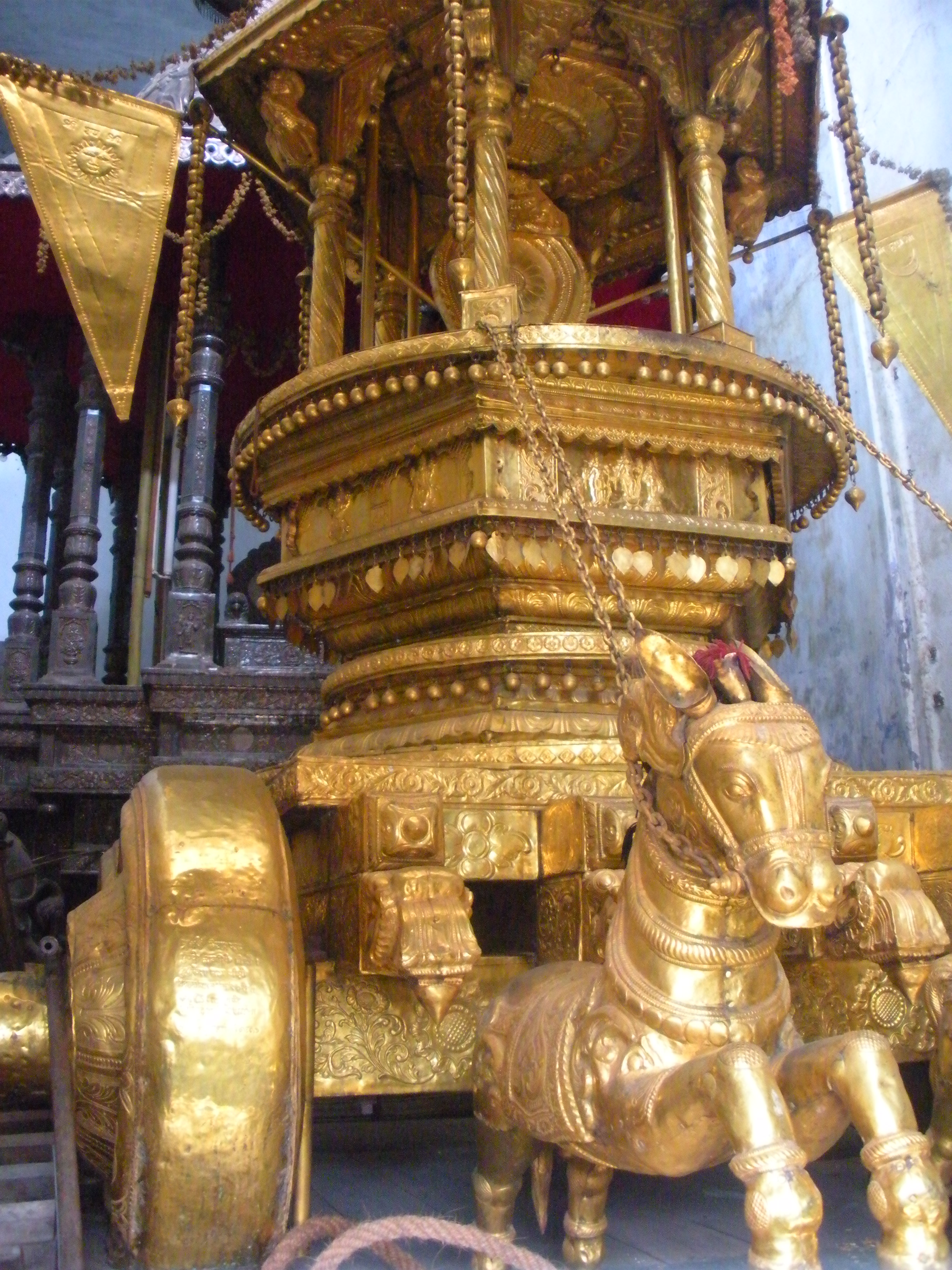
Golden Chariot of Udupi Sri Krishna Temple

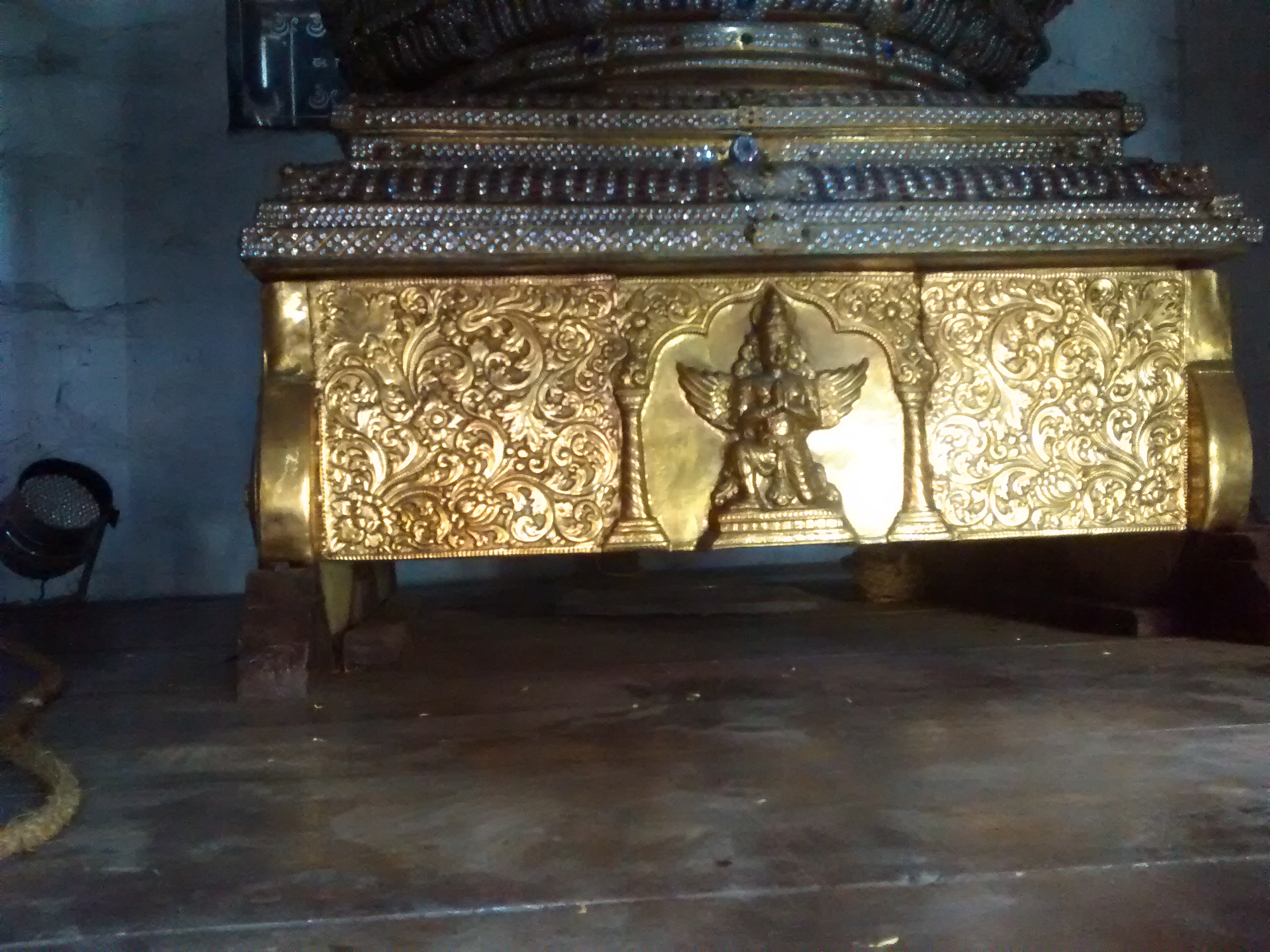
Base of Navarathna Chariot

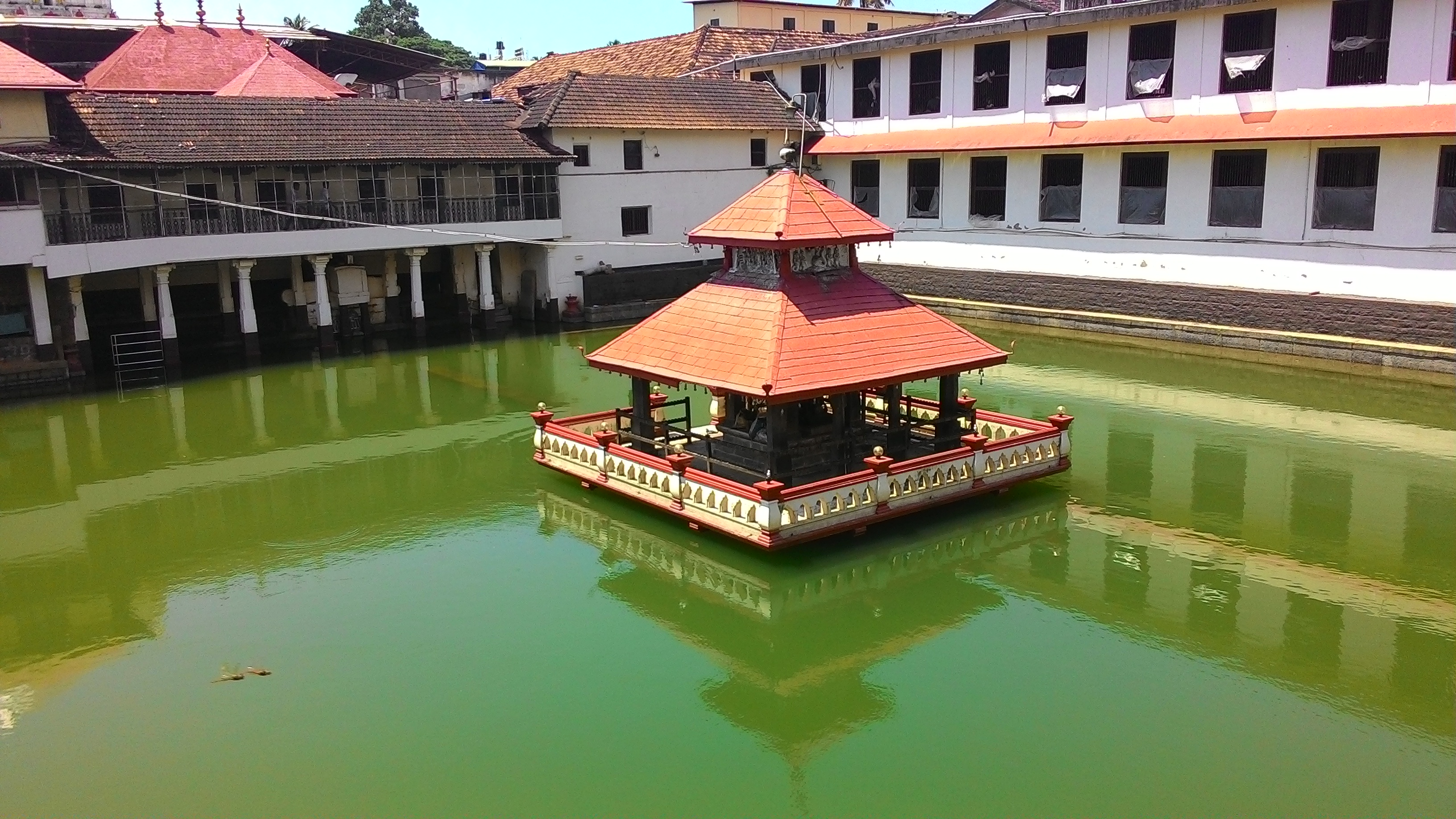
Udupi Sri krishna Temple pond
