= Shiroor Math =

Hindu monastery in Shiroor, Karnataka, India

Shiroor Matha is a Hindu monastery and one of the Ashta Mathas of Udupi. It was founded by Sri Vamana Tirtha at Shiroor village on the banks of the Swarna River in Udupi, Karnataka He was a direct disciple of Sri Madhvacharya, the founder of the Dvaita school of Hindu philosophy. The latest swami, Lakshmivara Teertha, died on Thursday 19, July 2018. The new Swamiji (Mathadeesha) Shri Vedavardhana Thirtha (Purvashrama nama: Aniruddha Saralatthaya) was anointed on 14 May 2021 after traditional religious rituals as per Madhva tradition by H. H. Shre Vishwavallabha Theertha Swamiji of Sode Matha.

== The Lineage – Guru Parampara – of Shiroor Matha ==
1. Sri Madhvacharya (1199–1278)
2. Sri Vamana Teertha
3. Sri Vasudeva Teertha
4. Sri Punyasloka Teertha
5. Sri Vedagamya Teertha
6. Sri Vedavyasa Teertha
7. Sri Vedavedya Teertha
8. Sri Mahesha Teertha
9. Sri Krishna Teertha
10. Sri Raghava Teertha
11. Sri Suresha Teertha
12. Sri Vedabhushana Teertha
13. Sri Srinivasa Teertha
14. Sri Vedanidhi Teertha
15. Sri Sridhara Teertha
16. Sri Yadavottama Teertha
17. Sri Lakshminarayana Teertha I
18. Sri Vishwabhushana Teertha
19. Sri Trailokyapavana Teertha
20. Sri Lakshmikantha Teertha
21. Sri Lakshminarayana Teertha II
22. Sri Lakshmipathi Teertha
23. Sri Lakshmidhara Teertha
24. Sri Lakshmiramana Teertha
25. Sri Lakshmimanohara Teertha
26. Sri Lakshmipriya Teertha
27. Sri Lakshmivallabha Teertha
28. Sri Lakshmisamudra Teertha
29. Sri Lakshmeendra Teertha (1926–1963)
30. Sri Lakshmimanojna Teertha (1963–1971) (he renounced the peetha in 1971)
31. Sri Lakshmivara Teertha (1971–2018)
32. Sri Vedavardhana Teertha (2021)

== See also ==
- Udupi Sri Krishna Matha
- Ashta Mathas of Udupi
- Dvaita Vedanta
- Dvaita literature
