= Pajaka =

Village in Karnataka, India

Coordinates: 13°16′15.99″N 74°47′29.2″E

Pajaka is a village in Udupi Taluk and district of Karnataka state in India. Pajaka is the place where Dvaita philosopher Sri Madhvacharya was born.

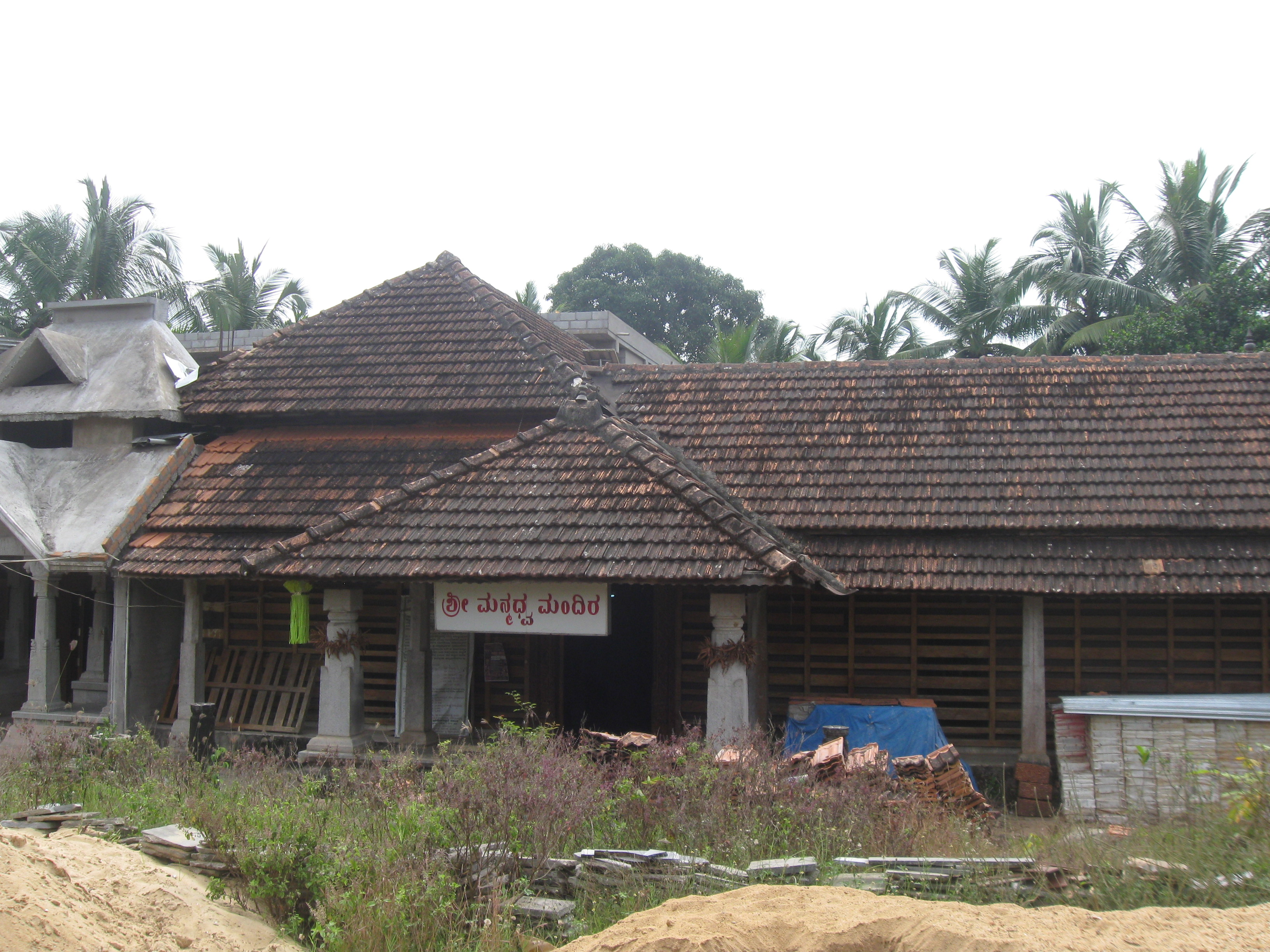
The temple of Sri Madhvacharya where there is an impression of his feet in Pajaka

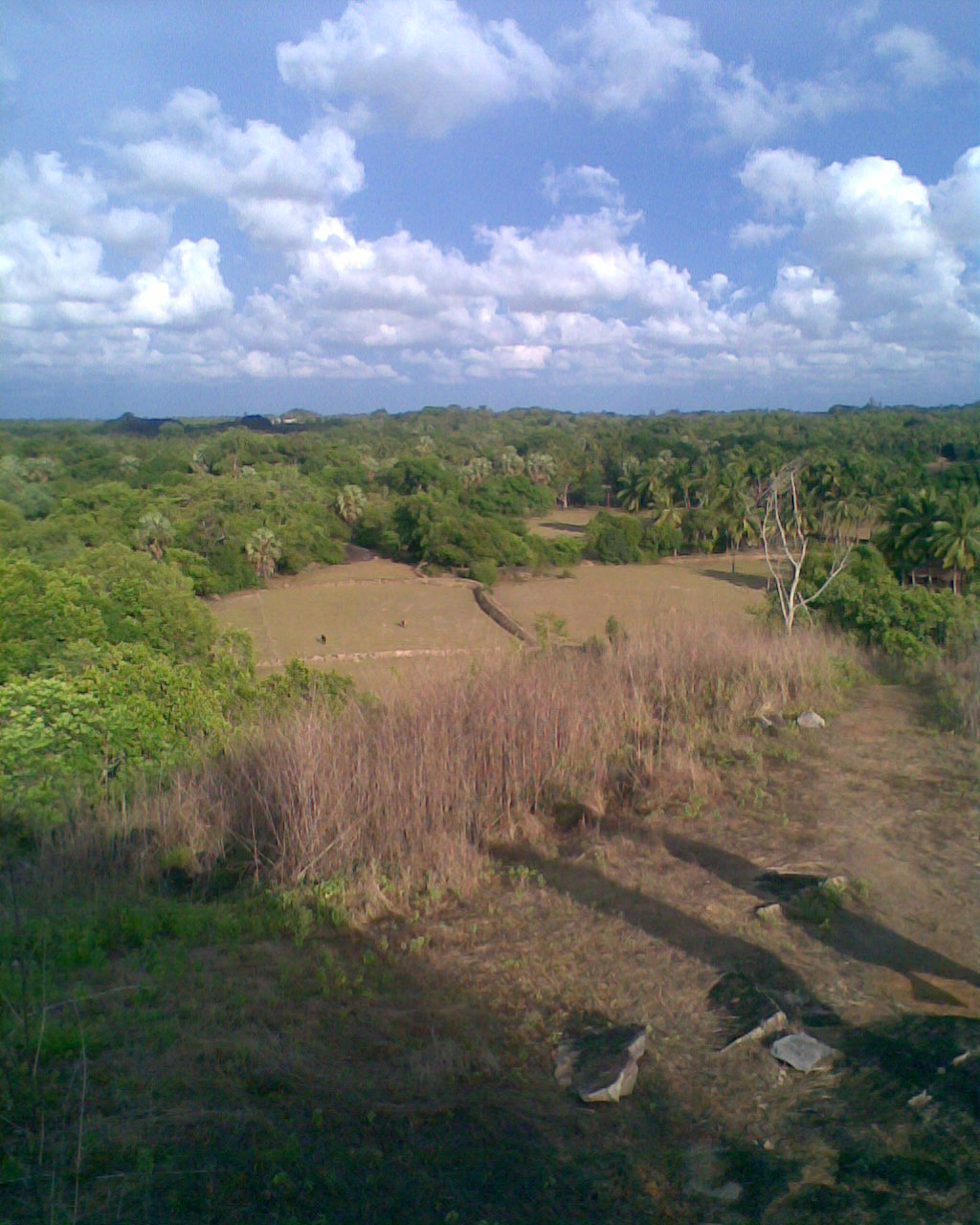
Pajaka Village
