= Ashta Mathas of Udupi =

Group of Hindu monasteries

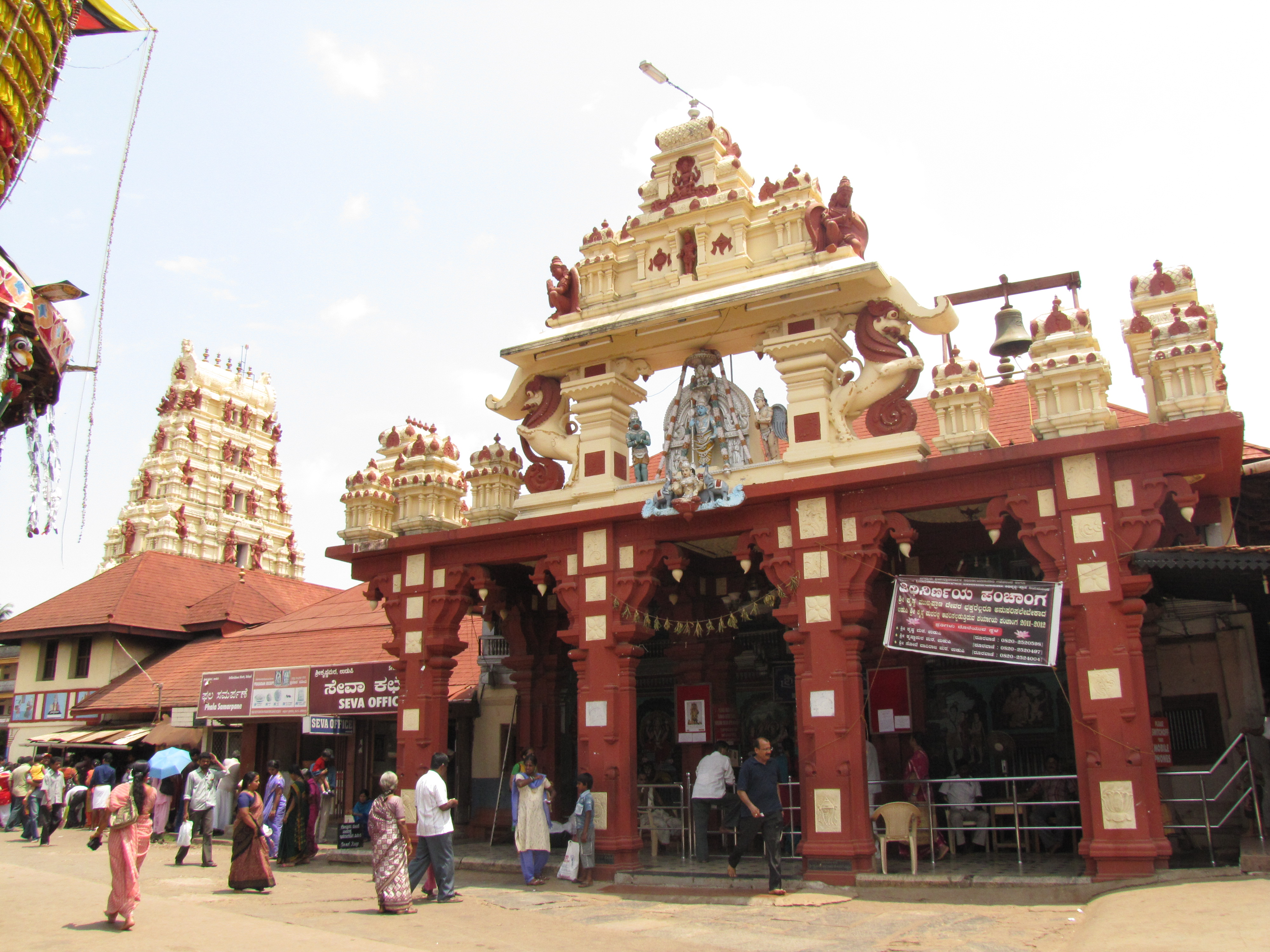
Sri Krishna Math, Udupi

The Ashta Mathas of Udupi (Tulu: ಉಡುಪಿ ಅಷ್ಟ ಮಠೊಕುಲು) (Kannada: ಉಡುಪಿಯ ತುಳು ಅಷ್ಟ ಮಠಗಳು) are a group of eight mathas or Hindu monasteries established by Madhvacharya, the preceptor of the Dvaita school of Hindu thought with his direct disciples to be the first Swami, head of the matha. Ashta Matha's are also known as Tulu Mathas and are directly founded by Jagadguru Madhvacharya himself. They are also called as Madhva Acharya Moola Samsthana Mathas. These eight mathas have ancient palm scripts written in Tulu language and script.

== List ==
The Ashta Mathas are named after the villages in which they were originally located. Today, the mathas are situated in the temple town of Udupi. The mathas work to propagate the Dvaita philosophy. They also administer the Udupi Krishna Temple by way of a formal rotation scheme called Paryaya.

Each pair of mathas is called Dvandva (literally, two or dual). The four pairs of mathas are: Palimaru and Adamaru; Krishnapura and Puttige; Shiroor and Sodhe; and Kaniyooru and Pejavara.

Ashta Mathas of Udupi
Matha	First Sannyasi	Presiding Deity	Reigning Pontiff	Successor	Image of matha in carstreet
Pejavara	Sri Adhokshaja Teertha	Vitthala with consorts Sri and Bhudevi	Sri Vishvaprasanna Teertha Swamiji		
Palimaru	Sri Hrishikesha Teertha	Kodanda Rama with consort Sita and brother Lakshmana	Sri Vidhyadeesha Teertha Swamiji	Sri Vidyarajeshwara theertha Swamiji	
Adamaru	Sri Narasimha Teertha	Kaliyamardana Krishna with four arms and Katyayani	Sri Vishvapriya Teertha Swamiji	Sri Eeshapriya Teertha	
Puttige	Sri Upendra Teertha	Vitthala with consorts Rukmini and Satyabhama	Sri Sugunendra Teertha Swamiji	Sri Sushreendra Teertha Swamiji	
Sodhe	Sri Vishnu Teertha Swamiji	Bhuvaraha	Sri Vishvavallabha Teertha Swamiji		
Kaniyooru	Sri Rama Teertha Swamiji	Yoga-Narasimha	Sri Vidyavallabha Teertha Swamiji		
Shiroor	Sri Vamana Teertha Swamiji	Vitthala (called "Vamana Vitthala" to differentiate from Pejavara icon) with consorts Sri and Bhudevi	Sri Vedavardhana Teertha Swamiji		
Krishnapura	Sri Janardhana Teertha Swamiji	Kaliyamardana Krishna	Sri Vidyasagara Teertha Swamiji		

== See also ==
- Uttaradi Math
- Mathatraya of Tattvavada
- Madhva Mathas

== Official websites of matahas ==
- Sri Puthige Matha
- Sri Pejavara Adhokshaja Matha
- Sri Adamaru Matha
- Sri Palimaru Matha
- Sri Kaniyooru Matha
- Sri Krishnapura Matha
- Sri Sode Vadiraja Matha
- Sri Shiroor Matha
