= Brahma Sampradaya =

Disciplic succession of gurus starting with Brahma

In Hinduism, the Brahma Sampradaya (IAST: Brahmā-sampradāya) is the disciplic succession (sampradaya) of gurus starting with Brahma. Brahma Sampradaya is synonymous to Tattvavada (Dvaita Vedanta) of Madhvacharya, and Sadh Vaishnavism, a tradition of Vaishnavism founded by Madhvacharya.

Followers of this tradition believe that Vedic knowledge descends from Brahma. In the Vedic conception, these sampradayas began at the creation of the universe and endure to the present moment due to the consistency of the transmission of knowledge, all the previous gurus are present in the teachings of the present spiritual master. The Vedic process assures that the transmission remains pure by assuring the qualifications of the transmitter.

Gaudiyas claim that they also belong to this lineage and use a longer-term Brahma-Madhva-Gaudiya Sampradaya (Brahmā-Madhva-Gauḍīya-sampradāya), or simply Madhva-Gaudiya Sampradaya, to refer to the teachings of Chaitanya Mahaprabhu and his Gaudiya Vaishnava theology. Author Steven J. Rosen says, "This affiliation was debated, and perhaps is still debated by scholars of Madhva traition, but is nonetheless generally accepted by the mass of people".

== See also ==
- Madhvacharya
- Sadh Vaishnavism
