= Krishnapura matha =

Madhwa Vaishnava monastery

Krishnapur Matha at Udupi

The Krishnapur Matha (Kannada: ಕೃಷ್ಣಾಪುರ ಮಠ कृष्णपुरा मठ Kr̥ṣṇāpura maṭha) or Krishnapur Mutt in some records and literature is a Madhwa Vaishnava monastery. It is one of the Ashta Mathas of Udupi founded by Dvaita philosopher Madhvacharya of Udupi. Krishnapur Matha is currently headed by Vidyasagara Theertha. The first swami of this monastery was Janardhana Theertha, who was one of the direct disciples of Madhvacharya. Its presiding deity is Kalingamardhana Krishna. The present swamiji (mathadeesha or peethadipati) of Krishnapura Matha Shri Vidyasagara Theertha ascended paryaya for fourth time on 18 January 2022 and completed his two year term of performing pooje to Lord Krishna at Shri Krishna Matha, Car street, Udupi on 17 January 2024.

This monastic order has many branches all over India. Some are at Udupi, Ramanakatte, Padigaru, Pejavara, Dandathirtha, Padubidri and others mostly in districts of Dakshina Kannada and Udupi of present day Karnataka state and one in Prayag (Allahabad).

The Krishnapur Matha owned last large tracts of land, but lost due to enactment of the law "Tiller is the owner of Land" by then Chief minister of Karnataka state Devaraj Urs in 1974.

The Matha (monastery) at Krishnapura (Sankesha or Sankesa) which is Three (3) kilometres from Surathkal locality of Mangalore city, is the main (Moola) Matha (Mata) from which the name has been derived.The matha houses a Mukyaprana temple inside where puja is performed every day. The present Matha building at Krishnapur was built by Sri Vidyamurthi Theertha who is twenty sixth Swamiji in this lineage built Matha (monastery at) Krishnapur. There is a Mukhyaprana Hanuman temple inside the Matha. The structure of the building is mostly made of wood. This type of structure is considered rare in the modern age of concrete buildings.

== Gallery ==
Krishnapur Matha at Udupi

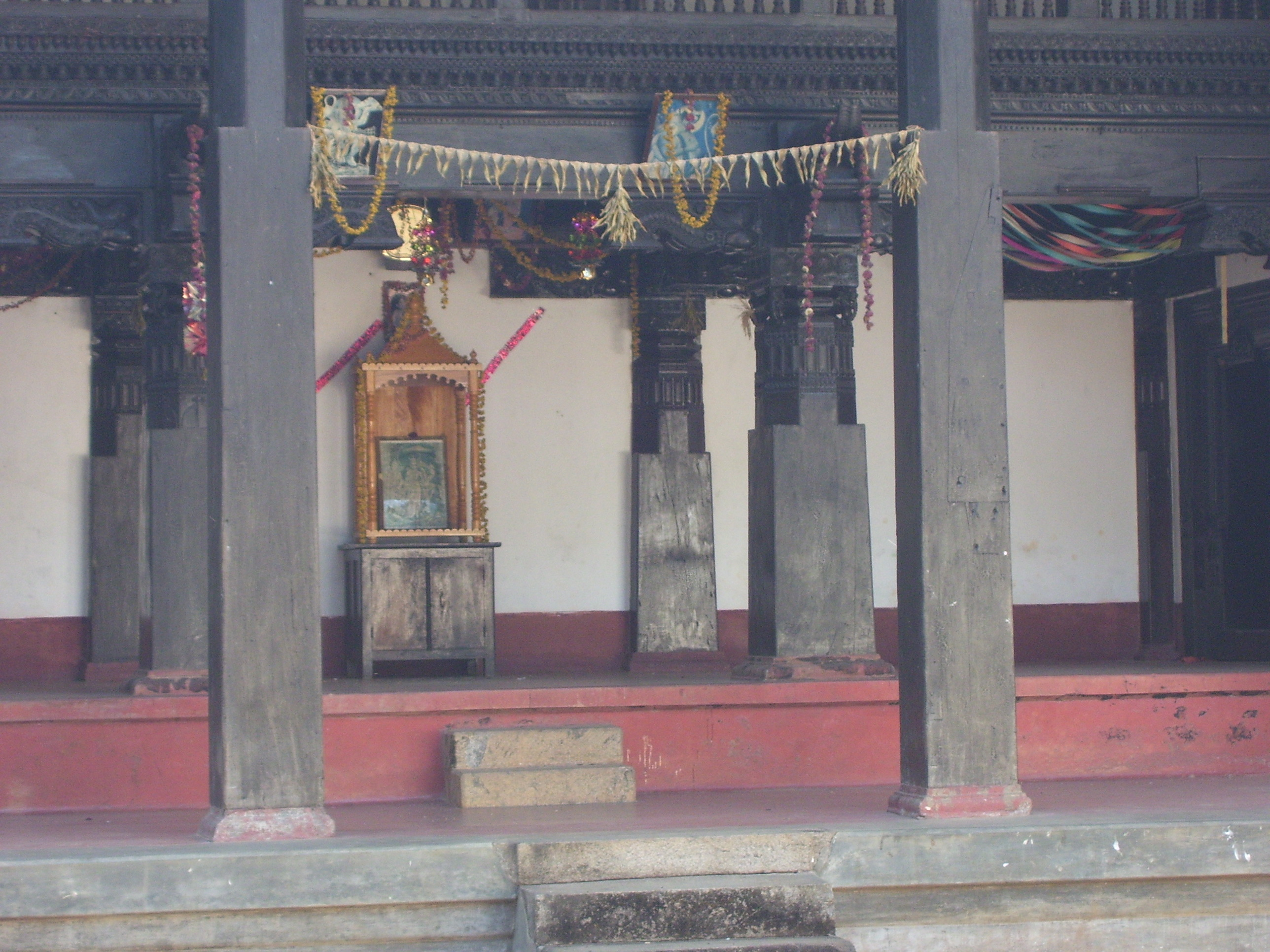
Mukara at Krishnapur

Sanctum Santorumn at Krishnapura (Sankesha).

Wood carving on pillar at Krishnapura matha

Wood structure supporting roof at Krishnapura Matha, Surathkal.

Pillars made from wood in Matha

== The lineage of Swamiji's (Guru parampara) of Krishnapur Matha ==
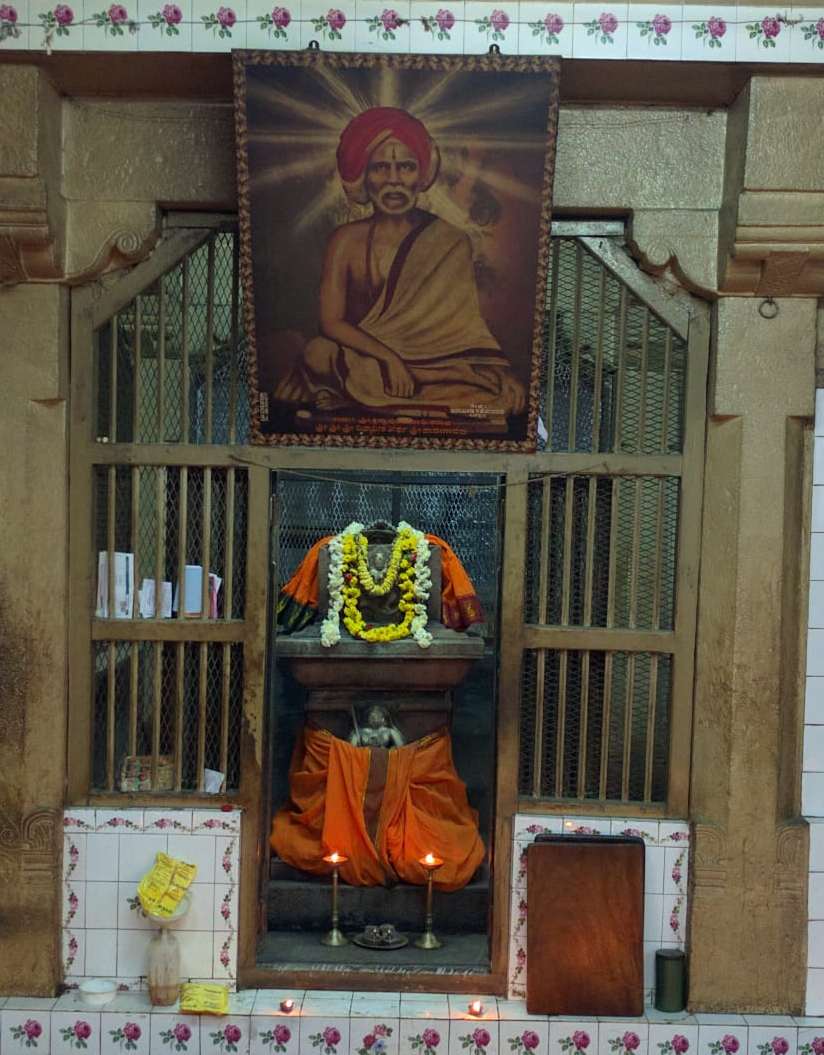

- Sri Madhvacharya (1238–1317)
- Sri Janaradhana Teertha (1317–1319)
- Sri Srivatsanka Teertha (1319–1359)
- Sri Vageesha Teertha (1359–1407)
- Sri Lokesha Teertha (1407–1447)
- Sri Lokanaatha Teertha (1447–1461)
- Sri Lokapoojya Teertha (1461–1473)
- Sri Vidyaaraja Teertha (1473–1483)
- Sri Vishwaaadhiraja Teertha (1483–1493)
- Sri Vishwaadheesha Teertha (1493–1506)
- Sri Vishwesha Teertha (1506–1519)
- Sri Vishwavandya Teertha (1519–1530)
- Sri Vishwaraaja Teertha (1530–1541)
- Sri Dharaneedhara Teertha (1541–1555)
- Sri Dharaadhara Teertha (1555–1567)
- Sri Prajnaamoorthi Teertha-I (1567–1578)
- Sri Tapomoorthi Teertha (1578–1589)
- Sri Sureshwara Teertha (1589–1601)
- Sri Jagannaatha Teertha (1601–1614)
- Sri Suresha Teertha (1614–1627)
- Sri Vishwapungava Teertha (1627–1638)
- Sri Vishwavallabha Teertha (1638–1649)
- Sri Vishwabhooshana Teertha (1649–1659)
- Sri Yaadhavendra Teertha (1659–1670)
- Sri Prajnaamoorthi Teertha II (1670–1701)
- Sri Vidyaadhiraja Teertha (1701–1705)
- Sri Vidyamoorthi Teertha (1705–1766)
- Sri Vidyavallabha Teertha (1766–1775)
- Sri Vidyendra Teertha (1775–1784)
- Sri Vidyaanidhi Teertha (1784–1799)
- Sri Vidyaasamudra Teertha (1799–1820)
- Sri Vidyaapathi Teertha (died before assuming office) (1820–1820)
- Sri Vidyaadheesha Teertha (1820–1886)
- Sri Vidyaapoorna Teertha(1886–1938)
- Sri Vidyarathna Teertha (1938–1972)
- Sri Vidya Saagara Teertha (present Swamiji)(1972)
