= Adamaru =

- village
- Location in Karnataka, India Adamaru (India)
- Coordinates: 13.167785°N 74.778217°E
- Country: India
- State: Karnataka
- District: Udupi

Languages
  - Official: Kannada
- Time zone: UTC+5:30 (IST)

Adamaru or Adamaar or Admar is a village in the Udupi district of the state of Karnataka, India. The village houses one of the Ashta Mathas known as Adamaru Matha founded by Shri Madhvacharya, the Dvaita philosopher. The village can be reached by taking a left turn at Yermal near Kaup town on Udupi-Mangalore route on National Highway 66 while travelling from Mangalore to Udupi. There is pre-university ( junior) college at Adamaru run by Adamaru Matha Education Council.
