= Madhvacharya =

13th century Hindu Dvaita philosopher

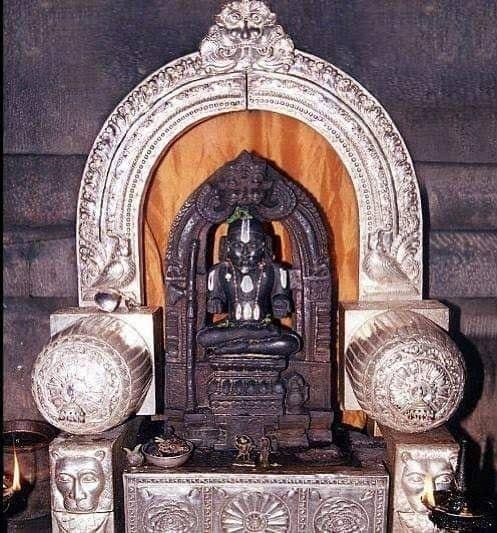
- Madhvacharya Vigraha installed by Vadiraja Tirtha at his birthplace Pajaka, Udupi

Personal life
- Born: Vāsudeva c. 1199 (or 1238) Pājaka, near Udupi; Karnataka
- Died: c. 1278 (or 1317)
- Notable works: Sarvamula Granthas
- Honors: Pūrṇa-prajña; Jagadguru

Religious life
- Religion: Hinduism
- Order: Vedanta
- Founder of: Udupi Sri Krishna Matha
- Philosophy: Tattvavada

Religious career
- Teacher: Achyuta-preksha, Vedavyasa
- Reincarnation: Vayu

Madhvacharya (IAST: Madhvācārya; pronounced [mɐdʱʋaːˈtɕaːrjɐ]; 1199–1278 CE or 1238–1317 CE), also known as Purna Prajna (IAST: Pūrṇa-Prajña) and Ānanda Tīrtha, was an Indian philosopher, theologian and the chief proponent of the Dvaita (dualism) school of Vedanta. Madhva called his philosophy Tattvavāda meaning "arguments from a realist viewpoint". Madhvacharya was born at Pajaka near Udupi on the west coast of Karnataka state in 13th-century India. As a teenager, he became a Sanyasi (monk) joining Brahma-sampradaya guru Achyutapreksha, of the Ekadandi order. Madhva studied the classics of Hindu philosophy, and wrote commentaries on the Principal Upanishads, the Bhagavad Gita and the Brahma Sutras (Prasthanatrayi), and is credited with thirty seven works in Sanskrit. His writing style was of extreme brevity and condensed expression. His greatest work is considered to be the Anuvyakhyana, a philosophical supplement to his bhasya on the Brahma Sutras composed with a poetic structure. In some of his works, he proclaimed himself to be an avatar of Vayu, the son of god Vishnu, however, the textual basis cited for some such claims has been questioned in modern scholarship, especially by Roque Mesquita, who argued that a number of scriptural sources adduced by Madhva in support of this and other doctrines are untraceable and were likely composed by Madhva himself under what he believed to be divine inspiration. Madhvacharya was a critic of Adi Shankara's Advaita Vedanta and Ramanuja's Vishishtadvaita Vedanta teachings. He toured India several times, visiting places such as Badrinath, Bengal, Varanasi, Dwaraka, Goa and Kanyakumari, engaging in philosophical debates and visiting Hindu centres of learning. Madhva established the Krishna Mutt at Udupi with a murti secured from Dwarka Gujarat in 1285 CE.

Madhvacharya's teachings are built on the premise that there is a fundamental difference between Atman (individual soul, self) and the Brahman (ultimate reality, God Vishnu), these are two different unchanging realities, with individual soul dependent on Brahman, never identical. His school's theistic dualism teachings disagreed with the monist teachings of the other two most influential schools of Vedanta based on Advaita's nondualism and Vishishtadvaita's qualified nondualism. Liberation, asserted Madhva, is achievable only through the grace of God. The Dvaita school founded by Madhva influenced Vaishnavism, the Bhakti movement in medieval India, and has been one of the three influential Vedānta philosophies, along with Advaita Vedanta and Vishishtadvaita Vedanta. Madhva's historical influence in Hinduism, state Kulandran and Kraemer: "has been salutary, but not extensive."

== Early life ==
The biography of Madhvacharya is unclear about his year of birth. Many sources date him to 1238–1317 period, but some place him about the 1199–1278 period.

Madhvācārya was born in Pajaka near Udupi, a coastal district in the present-day Indian state of Karnataka. Traditionally it is believed that his father's name is Naduillaya (Sanskrit: Madhyageha, Madhyamandira) and the name of his mother is unclear, although many sources variously claim it as Satyavati and Vedavati. Born in a Shivalli Brahmin household, he was named Vāsudeva. Later he became famous by the names Purnaprajna, Anandatirtha and Madhvacharya (or just Madhva). Pūrnaprajña was the name given to him at the time of his initiation into sannyasa (renunciation), as a teenager. The name conferred on him when he became the head of his monastery was "Ānanda Tīrtha". All three of his later names are found in his works. Madhvācārya or Madhva are names most commonly found in modern literature on him, or Dvaita Vedanta related literature.

Madhva began school after his Upanayana at age seven, and became a monk or Sannyasi in his teens, although his father was initially opposed to this. He joined an Advaita Vedanta monastery in Udupi (Karnataka), accepted his guru to be Achyutrapreksha, who is also referred to as Achyutraprajna in some sources. Madhva studied the Upanishads and the Advaita literature, but was unconvinced by its nondualism philosophy of oneness of human soul and god, had frequent disagreements with his guru, left the monastery, and began his own tattvavada movement based on dualism premises of Dvi – asserting that human soul and god (as Vishnu) are two different things. Madhva never acknowledged Achyutrapreksha as his guru or his monastic lineage in his writings. Madhva is said to have been clever in philosophy, and also to have been tall and strongly built.

== Career ==
Quotation

Reality is twofold: independent and dependent things. The Lord Vishnu is the only independent thing.

Madhvacharya never established a matha (monastery) dedicated to Dvaita philosophy, however his lineage of students became the sanctuary for a series of Dvaita scholars such as Jayatirtha, Sripadaraja, Vyasatirtha, Vadiraja Tirtha, Raghuttama Tirtha, Raghavendra Tirtha and Satyanatha Tirtha who followed in the footsteps of Madhva.

A number of hagiographies have been written by Madhva's disciples and followers. Of these, the most referred to and most authentic is the sixteen cantos Sanskrit biography Madhvavijaya by Narayana Panditacharya – son of Trivikrama Pandita, who himself was a disciple of Madhva.

=== Incarnation of Vayu, the wind god ===
In several of his texts, Sarma and other scholars state, "Madhvacharya proclaims himself to be the third avatar or incarnation of Vayu, wind god, the son of Vishnu". He, thus, asserted himself to be Hanuman – the first avatar of Vayu, and Bhima – a Pandava in the Mahabharata and the second avatar of Vayu. In one of his bhasya on the Brahma Sutras, he asserts that the authority of the text is from his personal encounter with Vishnu. Madhva, states Sarma, believed himself to be an intermediary between Vishnu and Dvaita devotees, guiding the latter in their journey towards Vishnu.

== Miracles ==
Madhva is said to have performed several miracles during his lifetime, including making tamarind seeds appear as made of gold, consuming 4,000 bananas and thirty big pots of milk in one sitting, fighting and winning against robbers and wild animals, crossing the Ganga without getting his clothes wet, and giving light to his students through the nails of his big toes after the lamp went out while they were interpreting a text at night.

== Interpretations ==
Madhvacharya is said to have quoted some verses from his unique revisions of scriptures. Also, he is said to have quoted many unique books like Kamatha Sruti. The interpretation of Balittha Sukta by Madhvacharya and his followers to prove that Madhvacharya was an incarnation of Vayu is considered highly unique by standard commentaries on them like Sayana and Horace Hayman Wilson.

Many of Madhvacharya's scriptural citations cannot be traced to any known existing texts, a problem first raised by rival scholars centuries ago. Appayya Dīkṣita (16th century), in his Madhvatantramukhamardana, accused Madhva of adducing spurious text passages in support of his teaching, and argued that Madhva's claim to be the third avatar of Vayu after Hanuman and Bhima was made in order to lend authority to these otherwise untraceable quotations. The scholar A. Venkatasubbhiah suggested as early as 1933 that Madhva had fabricated his sources. Indologist Roque Mesquita of the University of Vienna systematically investigated over 250 pages of untraceable quotations attributed by Madhva to the Puranas and the Mahabharata, concluding that these passages were original compositions by Madhva himself, produced under what Madhva sincerely believed to be divine inspiration from Vishnu, intimately connected to his self-identification as an incarnation of Vayu. Mesquita argued that Madhva's doctrine that an avatar is absolutely identical with the deity it incarnates effectively blurred the distinction between the original author of a scriptural text and Madhva as its reader and quoter, allowing Madhva to compose new verses in what he regarded as honest obedience to divine impulse rather than deliberate fraud. This view has been contested by Dvaita scholars such as B. N. K. Sharma and Shrisha Rao, who argue that Mesquita's research was incomplete and that some of the supposedly untraceable sources have collateral evidence for their existence in manuscript traditions not consulted by Mesquita.

== Works of Madhvacharya ==
Thirty seven Dvaita texts are attributed to Madhvacharya. Of these, thirteen are bhasya (review and commentary) on Principal Upanishads, a Madhva-bhasya on the foundational text of Vedanta school of Hinduism – Brahma Sutras, another Gita-bhasya on Bhagavad Gita, a commentary on forty hymns of the Rigveda, a review of the Mahabharata in poetic style, a commentary called Bhagavata-tatparya-nirnaya on Bhagavata Purana. Apart from these, Madhva is also attributed for authoring many stotras, poems and texts on bhakti of Vishnu and his avatars. The Anu-Vyakhyana, a supplement to Madhvacharya's commentary on Brahma Sutras, is his masterpiece, states Sharma.

While being a profusely productive writer, Madhvacharya restricted the access to and distribution of his works to outsiders who were not part of Dvaita school, according to Sarma. (Note: Quote from Bartley: Madhvacharya, the founder, prohibited outsiders from reading certain texts and from learning from teachers. These restrictions on eligibility, it is claimed, "insulated his position from criticism and evaluation.") However, Bartley disagrees and states that this is inconsistent with the known history of extensive medieval Vedantic debates on religious ideas in India which included Dvaita school's ideas.

== Madhva's philosophy ==
The premises and foundations of Dvaita Vedanta, also known as Dvaitavada and Tattvavada, are credited to Madhvacharya. His philosophy championed unqualified dualism. Madhva's work is classically placed in contrast with monist ideas of Shankara's Advaita Vedanta and Ramanuja's Vishishtadvaita Vedanta.

=== Epistemology ===
Madhva calls epistemology Anu pramana. It accepts three pramānas, that is three facts or three correct means of knowledge, in contrast to one of Charvaka and six of Advaita schools of Hindu philosophies:

- Pratyaksha (प्रत्यक्ष) means perception. It is of two types in Dvaita and other Hindu schools: external and internal. External perception is described as that arising from the interaction of five senses and worldly objects, while internal perception is described as that of inner sense, the mind.
- Anumāna (अनुमान) means inference. It is described as reaching a new conclusion and truth from one or more observations and previous truths by applying reason. Observing smoke and inferring fire is an example of Anumana. This method of inference consists of three parts: pratijna (hypothesis), hetu (a reason), and drshtanta (examples).
- Śabda (शब्द) means relying on word, testimony of past or present reliable experts. It is also known as Agama in Madhva's Dvaita tradition, and incorporates all the Vedas. Hiriyanna explains Sabda-pramana as a concept which means reliable expert testimony. The schools of Hinduism which consider it epistemically valid suggest that a human being needs to know numerous facts, and with the limited time and energy available, he can learn only a fraction of those facts and truths directly.

Madhva and his followers introduced kevala-pramana as the "knowledge of an object as it is", separate from anu-pramana described above.

Madhva's Dvaita school holds that Vishnu as a God, who is also Hari, Krishna, Vasudeva and Narayana, can only be known through the proper samanvaya (connection) and pramana of the Vedic scriptural teachings. Vishnu, according to Madhvacharya, is not the creator of the Vedas, but the teacher of the Vedas. Madhva's school of thought assert that knowledge is intrinsically valid, and the knower and the known are independently real. Madhvacharya asserted that both the ritual part (karma-kanda, Mimamsa) and the knowledge part (jnana-kanda, Upanishadic Vedanta) in the Vedas, are equally valid and an interconnected whole. As asserted by the Mimamsa school of Hindu philosophy, Madhvacharya held that the Vedas are author-less, and that their truth is in all of its parts (i.e. the saṃhitas, brāhmaņas, āraņyakās and upanișads)...

=== Metaphysics ===
The metaphysical reality is plural, stated Madhvacharya. There are primarily two tattvas or categories of reality – svatantra tattva (independent reality) and asvatantra tattva (dependent reality). Ishvara (as God Vishnu or Krishna) is the cause of the universe and the only independent reality, in Madhvacharya's view. The created universe is the dependent reality, consisting of Jīva (individual souls) and Jada (matter, material things). Individual souls are plural, different and distinct realities. Jīvas are sentient and matter is non-sentient, according to Madhvacharya.

Madhva further enumerates the difference between dependent and independent reality as a fivefold division (pancha-bheda) between God, souls and material things. These differences are: (1) Between material things; (2) Between material thing and soul; (3) Between material thing and God; (4) Between souls; and (5) Between soul and God.

This difference is neither temporary nor merely practical; it is an invariable and natural property of everything. Madhva calls it Taratamya (gradation in pluralism). There is no object like another, according to Madhvacharya. There is no soul like another. All souls are unique, reflected in individual personalities. The sea is full; the tank is full; a pot is full; everything is full, yet each fullness is different, asserted Madhvacharya.

Taratamya is based on inherent differences amongst all beings. These differences determine whether souls are eligible for liberation, rebirth, or darkness.

According to Madhvacharya, even in liberation (moksha), the bliss is different for each person based on each one's degree of knowledge and spiritual perfection. This liberation according to him, is only achievable with grace of God Vishnu.

==== Nature of the Brahman ====
Madhva conceptualised Brahman as a being who enjoys His own bliss, while the entire universe evolves through a nebulous chaos. He manifests, every now and then, to help the evolution process. The four primary manifestation of Him as the Brahman are, according to Madhva, Vasudeva, Pradyumna, Aniruddha and Sankarsana, which are respectively responsible for the redemptive, creative, sustaining and destructive aspects in the universe. His secondary manifestations are many, and all manifestations are at par with each other, it is the same infinite no matter how He manifests. Brahman is the creator of the universe, perfect in knowledge, perfect in knowing, perfect in its power, and distinct from souls, distinct from matter. For liberation, mere intellectual conceptualization of Brahman as creator is not enough, the individual soul must feel attraction, love, attachment and devotional surrender to Him, and only His grace leads to redemption and liberation, according to Madhva.

The Vishnu as Brahman concept of Madhvacharya is a concept similar to God in major world religions. His writings led some early colonial-era Indologists such as George Abraham Grierson to suggest the 13th-century Madhva was influenced by Christianity, but later scholarship has rejected this theory.

=== Soteriology ===
Madhvacharya considered Jnana Yoga and Karma Yoga to be insufficient to the path of liberation without Bhakti. Vishnu was the supreme God to Madhva, who can only be reached through Vayu; he further states, faith leads to the grace of God, and grace leads to the liberation of soul.

The knowledge of God, for Madhvacharya, is not a matter of intellectual acceptance of the concept, but an attraction, affection, constant attachment, loving devotion and complete surrender to the grace of God. He rejects monist theories believing that knowledge liberates, asserting instead that it is Divine grace through Bhakti that liberates. To Madhva, God obscures reality by creating Maya and Prakriti, which causes bondage and suffering; and only God can be the source of soul's release. Liberation occurs when, with the grace of God, one knows the true nature of self and the true nature of God.

=== Ethics ===
Evil and suffering in the world, according to Madhvacharya, originates in man, and not God. Every Jiva (individual soul) is the agent of actions, not Jada (matter), and not Ishvara (God). While Madhva asserts each individual self is the Kartritva (real agency), the self is not an absolutely independent agent to him. This is because, states Madhva, the soul is influenced by sensory organs, one's physical body and such material things which he calls as gifts of God. Man has free will, but is influenced by his innate nature, inclinations and past karma.

Madhvacharya asserts, Yathecchasi tatha kuru, which Sharma translates and explains as "one has the right to choose between right and wrong, a choice each individual makes out of his own responsibility and his own risk". Madhva does not address the problem of evil, that is how can evil exist with that of a God who is omnipotent, omniscient, and omnibenevolent. According to Sharma, "Madhva's tripartite classification of souls makes it unnecessary to answer the problem of evil". According to David Buchta, this does not address the problem of evil, because the omnipotent God "could change the system, but chooses not to" and thus sustains the evil in the world. This view of self's agency of Madhvacharya was, states Buchta, an outlier in Vedanta school and Indian philosophies in general.

This observation from David Buchta is countered and explained by the understanding that the tripartite characteristic is intrinsic to the souls. That is to say, those specific characteristics define each soul individually, and any attempt to change these would mean changing the souls themselves and subsequently the identity of each individual. Therefore, changing these tripartite characteristics would cause that particular individual to no longer exist, and each individual exists for a particular reason. Nonetheless, an omnipotent being would be still able to prevent evil without changing the intrinsic nature of the soul since the omnipotent being is not bound by any limitations, especially those within the dependent reality. Therefore, the final explanation is that the omnipotent being is not purposefully allowing evil to occur but rather allows an independent operation of the dependent reality to encourage free will in each individual. It is therefore the individual's choice whether to seek out the omnipotent being through faith, which allows the individual guidance on how to lead a life of virtue. Thus, evil is a failure to live life with virtue and a natural consequence of free will.

Moral laws and ethics exist, according to Madhva, and are necessary for the grace of God and for liberation.

== Views on other schools ==
Madhvacharya was a fierce critic of competing Vedanta schools, and other schools of Indian philosophies such as Buddhism and Jainism. He wrote up arguments against twenty one ancient and medieval era Indian scholars to help establish the foundations of his own school of thought.

Madhvacharya was most ardent critic of Advaita Vedanta, accusing Shankara and the Advaitins of teaching Buddhism under the cover of Vedanta. Advaita's nondualism asserts that Atman (soul) and Brahman are blissful and identical, unchanging transcendent Reality, there is interconnected oneness of all souls and Brahman, with no pluralities. Madhva, in contrast asserts that Atman (soul) and Brahman are different, only Vishnu is the Lord (Brahman), individual souls are also distinct and depend on Vishnu, and there are pluralities. Of all schools, Madhva directed his critique at Advaita most, penning four major texts, including Upadhikhandana and Tattvadyota, primarily dedicated to scrutinizing Advaita.

Madhvacharya criticized Shankara's interpretation of "Tat Tvam Asi", an Upanishadic saying used by Advaita to express the unity of the individual soul (jiva) and ultimate reality (Brahman). According to B.N.K. Sharma, Madhva reinterpreted it to emphasize difference (bheda) rather than identity (abheda), understanding such statements as expressing "the special immanence of the Deity in every jot and tittle of Matter and Spirit".

Madhvacharya disagreed with aspects of Ramanuja's Vishishtadvaita. Vishishtadvaita school, a realist system of thought like Madhvacharya's Dvaita school, also asserts that Jiva (human souls) and Brahman (as Vishnu) are different, a difference that is never transcended. God Vishnu alone is independent, all other gods and beings are dependent on Him, according to both Madhvacharya and Ramanuja. However, in contrast to Madhvacharya's views, Vishishtadvaita school asserts "qualified non-dualism", that souls share the same essential nature of Brahman, and that there is a universal sameness in the quality and degree of bliss possible for human souls, and every soul can reach the bliss state of God Himself. While the older school of Vishishtadvaita asserted "qualitative monism and quantitative pluralism of souls", states Sharma, Madhvacharya asserted both "qualitative and quantitative pluralism of souls".

Shankara's Advaita school and Ramanuja's Vishishtadvaita school are premised on the assumption that all souls can hope for and achieve the state of blissful liberation; in contrast, Madhvacharya posited that some souls enjoy spreading chaos and irreligion, and even enjoy being eternally doomed and damned as such.

Madhvacharya's style of criticism of other schools of Indian philosophy was part of the ancient and medieval Indian tradition. He was part of the Vedanta school, which emerged in post-Vedic period as the most influential of the six schools of Hindu philosophy, and his targeting of Advaita tradition, states Bryant, reflects it being the most influential of Vedanta schools.

== Influence ==
Sri Krishna Temple, Udupi

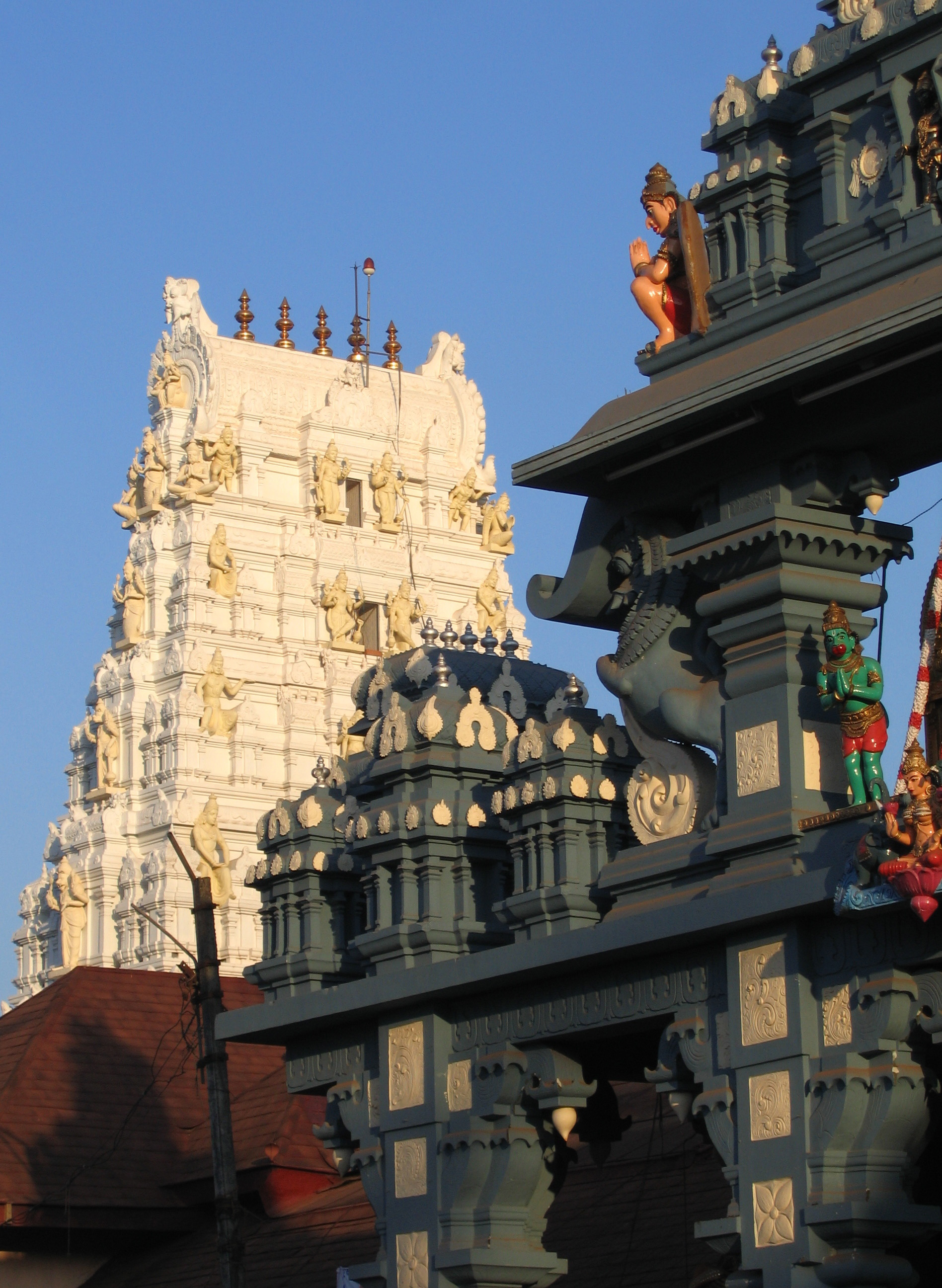
Udupi Sri Krishna Temple established by Madhvacharya

Madhvacharya extended an independent, original philosophy in the inference of Vaishnavism.

The Madhva Sampradaya fostered Bhakti and search of Knowledge. Madhvacharya and his ascetic followers propagated the Dvaita Siddhanta through their commentaries and critical lectures. Such literature and works for critical thinking were written majorly in Sanskrit and not readily accessible to common people. An alternate avenue evolved organically by Sishyas or Bhaktas of the Madhva Philosophy who studied these core books, read philosophy, practised asceticism though living a householder's life, dedicated themselves to the service of God. This set of followers undertook the mission of carrying Madhva's teaching to the four corners of the country using Kannada or the local language as a vehicle of communication. These spirited missionaries were known as the Hari-Dasas. The HariDasas pioneered in breaking the shackles of caste, creed and regionalism – they practiced devotion in its purest form and were instrumental in delivering the marvels of Madhva Siddhantha to the common man by way of songs, suladees and Bhakti Dasa Sahitya. These Haridasas came to be known as the Dasa Section or Dasa-Kuta of the Madhva Sampradaya in contrast with the Vyaasa-Kuta who were Scholars, Pandits or teachers of literature & critical thought.

There is no difference between the Vyasa-kuta and Dasa-Kuta in their learning, training, or approach to philosophy. While Vyasa-Kuta being scholars, Acharyas or Pandits strongly believed in acquiring Jnaana/Knowledge traditionally, the Dasa-Kuta simplified the acquired knowledge into Bhakti or devotion. The terms 'Dasaru' and 'Vyasaru' first came into vogue at the time of Purandaradasa and his religious preceptor, Vyasaraya. Over time, 'Vyasakuta' meant the branch of devotees who were well-versed in Sanskrit and who knew the philosophy in the original, and 'Dasakuta' or Dasa Dasapantha, meant that branch of devotees who conveyed the meassage of Dvaita philosophy through simplified vernacular Bhakti movement.

Other influential subschools of Vaishnavism competed with the ideas of Madhvacharya, such as the Chaitanya subschool, whose Jiva Gosvami asserts that only Krishna is "Svayam Bhagavan" (the supreme form of God), in contrast to Madhva who asserts that all Vishnu avatars are equal and identical, with both sharing the belief that emotional devotion to God is the means to spiritual liberation. Chaitanya Mahaprabhu (1496–1534) is said to be a disciple of Isvara Puri who was a disciple of Madhavendra Puri who was a disciple of Lakshmipati Tirtha who was a disciple of Vyasatirtha (1469–1539) of Madhvacharya's Sampradaya. According to Sharma, the influence of Madhva's Dvaita ideas have been most prominent on the Chaitanya school of Bengal Vaishnavism, and in Assam.

A subsect of Gaudiya Vaishnavas from Orissa and West Bengal claim to be followers of Madhvacharya. Madhva established in Udupi Krishna Matha attached to a god Krishna temple. Gaudiya Vaishnavas also worship Krishna, who is in the mode of Vrindavana.

=== Hindu-Christian-Muslim controversies ===
Madhvacharya was misperceived and misrepresented by both Christian missionaries and Hindu writers during the colonial era scholarship. The similarities in the primacy of one God, dualism and distinction between man and God, devotion to God, the son of God as the intermediary, predestination, the role of grace in salvation, as well as the similarities in the legends of miracles in Christianity and Madhvacharya's Dvaita tradition fed these stories. Among Christian writers, GA Grierson creatively asserted that Madhva's ideas evidently were "borrowed from Christianity, quite possibly promulgated as a rival to the central doctrine of that faith". Among Hindu writers, according to Sarma, SC Vasu creatively translated Madhvacharya's works to identify Madhvacharya with Christ, rather than compare their ideas.

Modern scholarship rules out the influence of Christianity on Madhvacharya, as there is no evidence that there ever was a Christian settlement where Madhvacharya grew up and lived, or that there was a sharing or discussion of ideas between someone with knowledge of the Bible and Christian legends, and him.

There are also assumptions Madhva was influenced by Islam. The Madhvavijaya tells about Madhva meeting the Sultan of Delhi and saying to him in fluent Persian that both worship the same one God of the universe, and that he spreads the faith in God. The sultan is said to have been so impressed by this that he wanted give half of the empire to Madhva, which he refused. However, the indologist and religious scholar Helmuth von Glasenapp assumes that monotheism can also be derived from the Indian intellectual world, and that there is no reason supporting the theory that Madhva's views on afterlife were influenced by Muslim or Christian impulses.

=== Monasteries ===
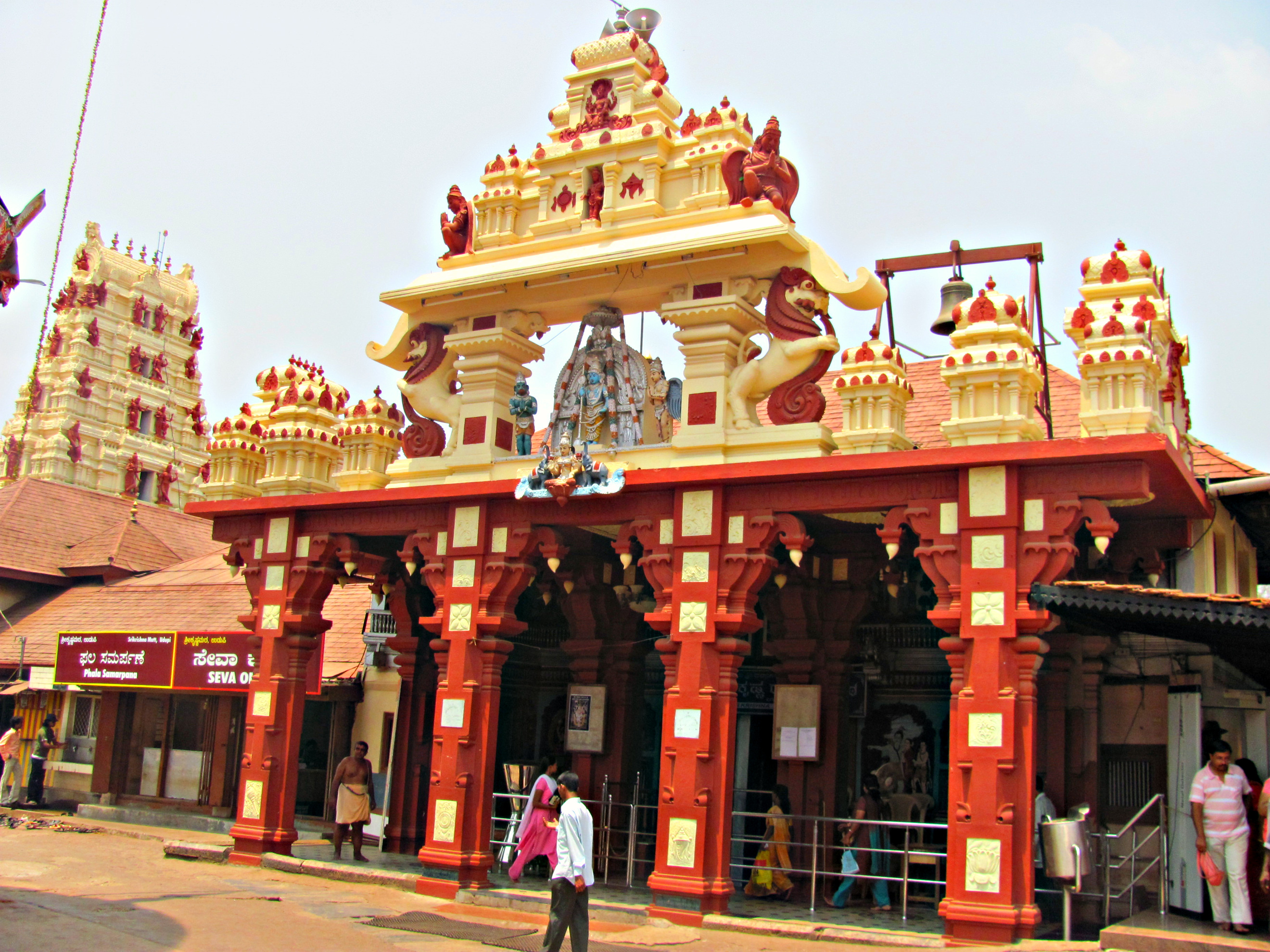
The Entrance to Sri Krishna Matha at Udupi

Madhvacharya established eight mathas (monasteries) in Udupi with his eight disciples as its head along with Padmanabha Tirtha Matha. The Udupi Ashta Mathas are Palimaru matha, Adamaru matha, Krishnapura matha, Puttige matha, Shirur matha, Sodhe matha, Kaniyooru matha and Pejavara matha. These eight surround the Anantheswara Krishna Hindu temple. The matha are laid out in a rectangle, the temples on a square grid pattern. The monks in the matha are sannyasis, and the tradition of their studies and succession (Paryaya system) were established by Madhvacharya. The monastery has a pontiff system, that rotates after a fixed period of time. The pontiff is called Swamiji, and he leads daily Krishna prayers according to Madhva tradition, as well as annual festivals. The process and Vedic mantra rituals for Krishna worship in Dvaita monasteries follow the procedure written by Madhvacharya in Tantrasara. The Krishna worship neither involves bali (sacrifice) nor any fire rituals. The succession ceremony in Dvaita school involves the outgoing Swamiji welcoming the incoming one, then walking together to the icon of Madhvacharya at the entrance of Krishna temple in Udupi, offering water to him, expressing reverence then handing over the same vessel with water that Madhvacharya used when he handed over the leadership of the monastery he founded. The monastery include kitchens, bhojan-shala, run by monks and volunteers. These serve food daily to nearly 15,000 to 20,000 monks, students and visiting pilgrims without social discrimination. During succession ceremonies, over 80,000 people are served a vegetarian meal by Udupi bhojan-shalas.

Madhvacharya established a matha with his disciple Padmanabha Tirtha as its head to spread Tattvavada (Dvaita) outside Tulunadu region with the instructions that his disciples Narahari Tirtha, Madhava Tirtha and Akshobhya Tirtha should, in turn, become the successors of this matha. According to Surendranath Dasgupta, Uttaradi Math is the main matha of Padmanabha Tirtha and it was divided twice, and so we end up with three mathas, the other two being Vyasaraja Math and Raghavendra Math. Uttaradi Math, along with Vyasaraja Math and Raghavendra Math, is considered to be the three premier apostolic institutions of Dvaita Vedanta and are jointly referred as Mathatraya. It is the pontiffs and pandits of the Mathatraya that have been the principle architects of post-Madhva Dvaita Vedanta through the centuries. Among the mathas outside of Tulu Nadu region, Uttaradi Matha is the largest. All the mathas outside of the Tulu region are one way or the other descended from Padmanabha Tirtha. Including mathas in Udupi, there are twenty-four Madhva mathas in India. The main center of Madhva's tradition is in Karnataka.

Professor Kiyokazu Okita and Indologist B. N. K. Sharma says, Sannyasis in the lineage of Dvaita school of Vedanta belongs to Ēkadaṇḍi tradition just like the Sanyasi's of Advaita of Adi Shankara.

== Film ==
A film directed by G. V. Iyer titled Madhvacharya premiered in 1986. It is entirely in the Kannada language.

== See also ==
- Brahma Sampradaya
- Madhva Brahmins
- Dvaita literature
- Ashta Mathas of Udupi

== Bibliography ==
- Dehsen, Christian von (1999). Philosophers and Religious Leaders. Routledge. ISBN 978-1573561525.
- Bryant, Edwin (2007). Krishna : A Sourcebook (Chapter 15 by Deepak Sarma). Oxford University Press. ISBN 978-0195148923.
- Jones, Constance; Ryan, James D. (2006), Encyclopedia of Hinduism, Infobase, ISBN 9780816075645, archived from the original on 20 October 2022
- Sharma, B. N. Krishnamurti (1962). Philosophy of Śrī Madhvācārya. Motilal Banarsidass (2014 Reprint). ISBN 978-8120800687.
- Sharma, B. N. Krishnamurti (2000). A History of the Dvaita School of Vedānta and Its Literature, 3rd Edition. Motilal Banarsidass (2008 Reprint). ISBN 978-8120815759. Archived from the original on 23 December 2023.
- Sharma, Chandradhar (1994). A Critical Survey of Indian Philosophy. Motilal Banarsidass. ISBN 978-81-208-0365-7.
- Sarma, Deepak (2000). "Is Jesus a Hindu? S.C. Vasu and Multiple Madhva Misrepresentations". Journal of Hindu-Christian Studies. 13. doi:10.7825/2164-6279.1228.
- Sheridan, Daniel (1991). Texts in Context: Traditional Hermeneutics in South Asia (Editor: Jeffrey Timm). State University of New York Press. ISBN 978-0791407967.
- Stoker, Valerie (2011). "Madhva (1238–1317)". Internet Encyclopedia of Philosophy. Archived from the original on 12 October 2016.
