= Dasa sahitya =

Literature of the Bhakti movement

Dasa Sahitya (Kannada: ದಾಸ ಸಾಹಿತ್ಯ) is a genre of literature of the Bhakti movement, composed by devotees in honor of Vishnu or one of his avatars.

== Composers ==
- Naraharitirtha
- Sripadaraja
- Vyasatirtha.
- Vadirajatirtha
- Raghavendra Tirtha
- Purandaradasa
- Kanakadasa.
- Vijaya Dasa.
- Gopaladasaru.
- Jagannathadasaru
- Mahipati Dasa
