= Vijayanagara literature in Kannada =

14th–16th-century body of literature

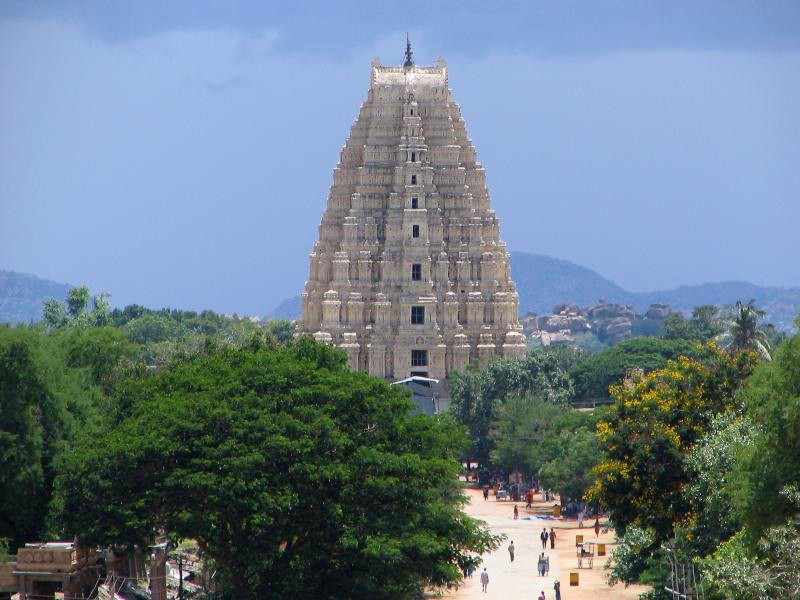
Virupaksha temple at Hampi, the sacred centre at Vijayanagara, the royal capital

Vijayanagara literature in Kannada is the body of literature composed in the Kannada language of South India during the ascendancy of the Vijayanagara Empire which lasted from the 14th through the 16th century. The Vijayanagara empire was established in 1336 by Harihara I and his brother Bukka Raya I. Although it lasted until 1664, its power declined after a major military defeat by the Shahi Sultanates in the battle of Talikota in 1565. The empire is named after its capital city Vijayanagara, whose ruins surround modern Hampi, now a World Heritage Site in Karnataka.

Kannada literature during this period consisted of writings relating to the socio-religious developments of the Veerashaiva and Vaishnava faiths, and to a lesser extent to that of Jainism. Writing on secular topics was popular throughout this period. Authorship of these writings was not limited to poets and scholars alone. Significant literary contributions were made by members of the royal family, their ministers, army commanders of rank, nobility and the various subordinate rulers. In addition, a vast body of devotional folk literature was written by musical bards, mystics and saint-poets, influencing society in the empire. Writers of this period popularised use of the native metres: shatpadi (six-line verse), sangatya (compositions meant to be sung to the accompaniment of a musical instrument), and tripadi (three-line verse).

The development of Veerashaiva literature was at its peak during the reign of King Deva Raya II, the best-known of the Sangama dynasty rulers. The rule of King Krishnadeva Raya of the Tuluva dynasty and his successors was a high point in Vaishnava literature. The influence of Jain literature, which had dominated Kannada language in the previous centuries, was on the wane with increasing competition from the resurgent Veerashaiva faith and Vaishnava bhakti movement (devotional movement of the haridasas). Interaction between Kannada and Telugu literatures left lasting influences that continued after the Vijayanagara era.

== Court literature ==
=== Overview ===
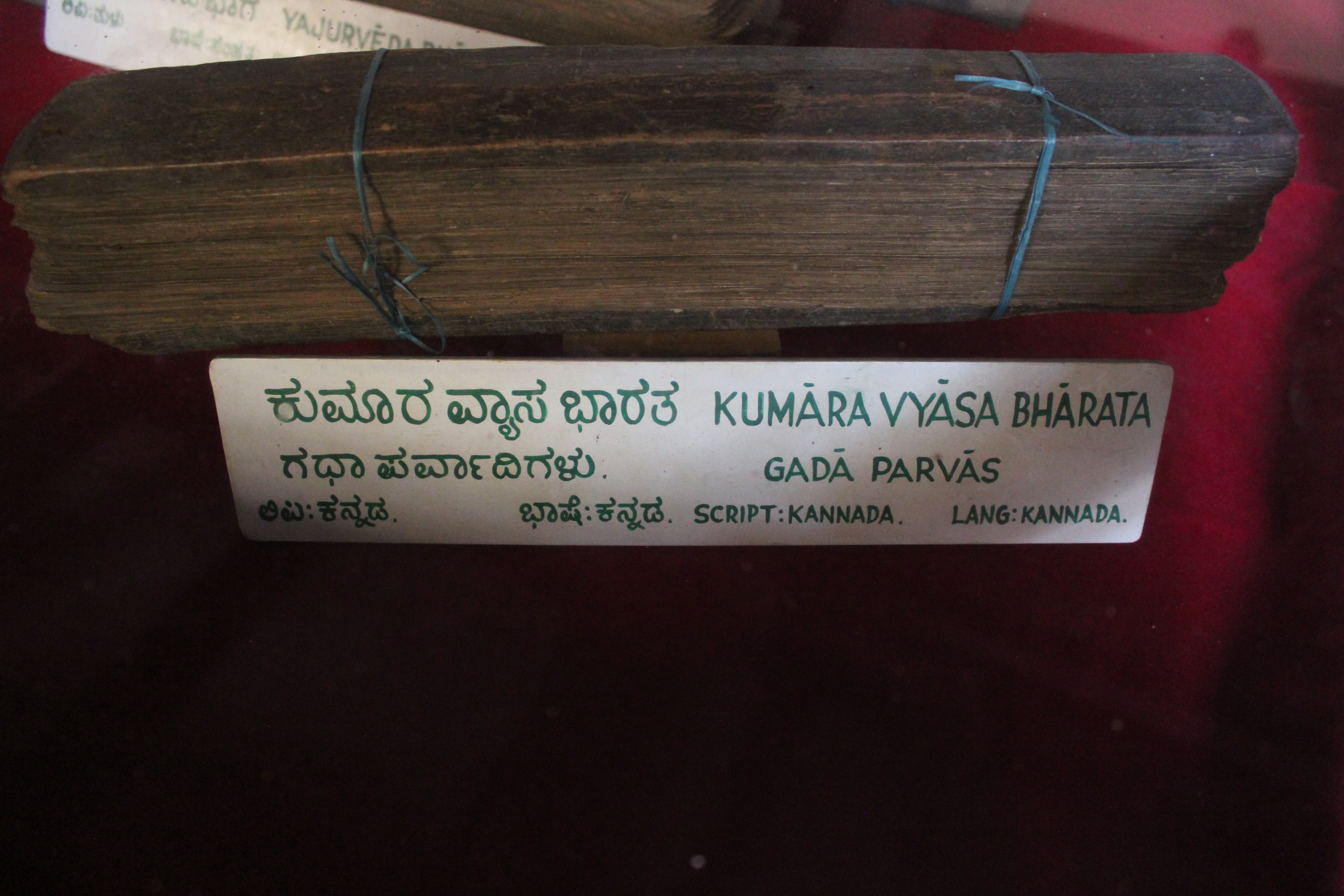
Gada Parva ('Battle of the Clubs') section of Kumaravyasa's epic Kumaravyasa Bharata in Kannada (c.1425-1450)

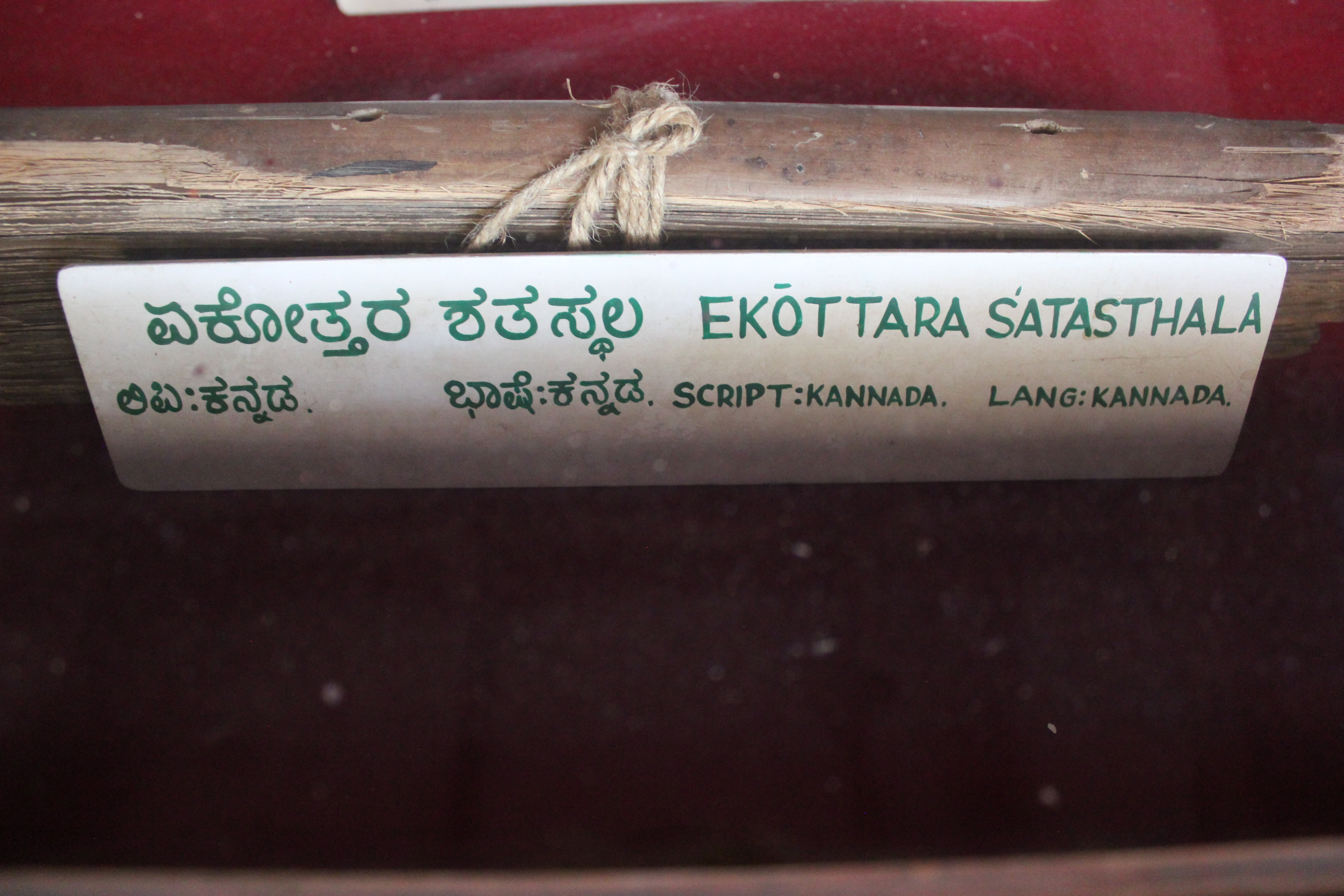
The Kannada classic Ekottara Satasthala (also called Noorondu Sthala) by Jakkanarya (c.1425-1450), a minister in the royal court, was written during the rule of King Deva Raya II

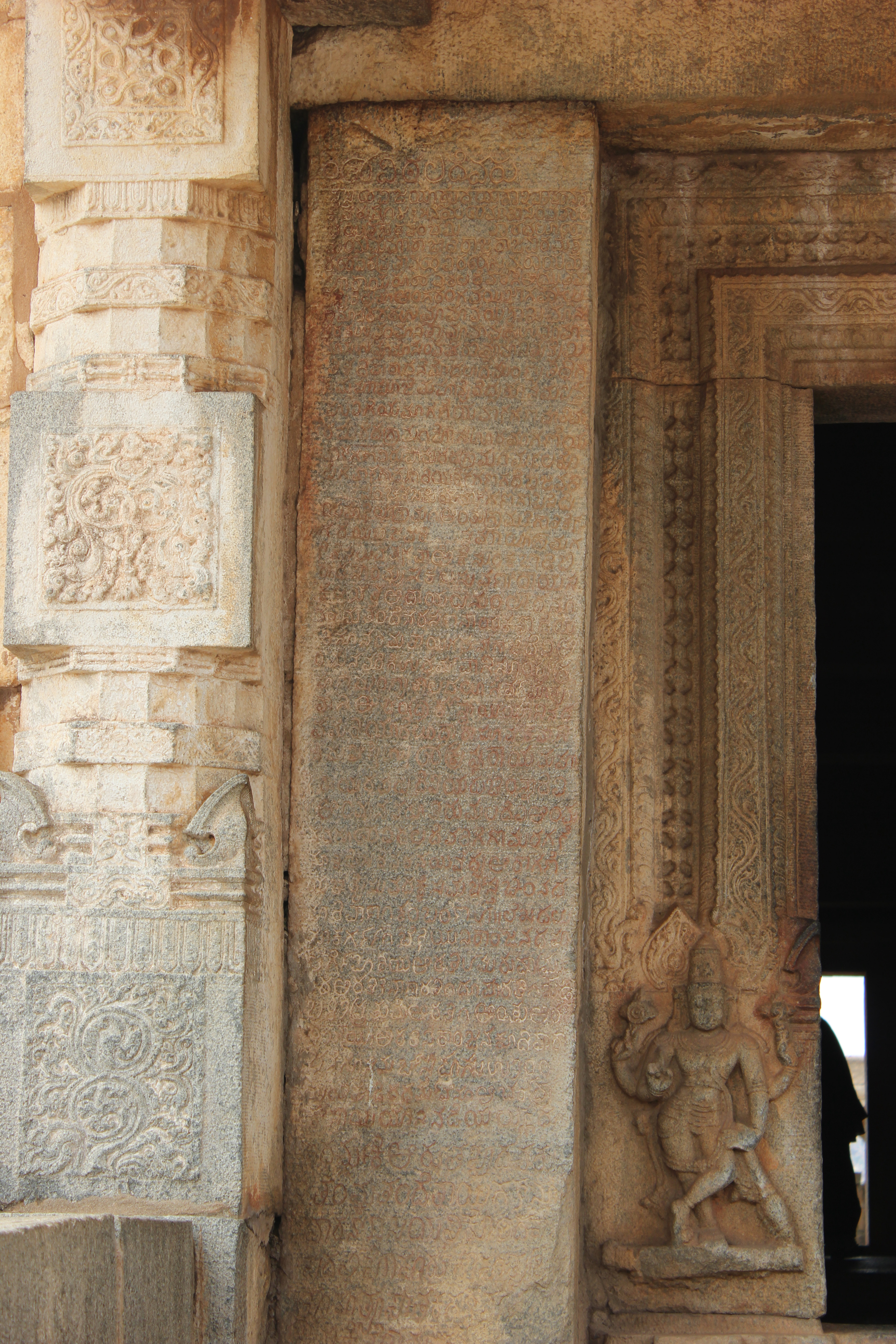
Kannada inscription of King Krishnadeva Raya dated 1513 A.D., at the Vitthala temple in Hampi. In addition to grants, the inscription provides useful information about his three queens, his father Narasa Nayaka, and his mother Nagala Devi

Before the 12th century, Jain writers had dominated Kannada literature with their champu (verses mixed with prose) style of writings popular in court literature. In the later medieval period, they had to contend with the Veerashaivas who challenged the very notion of royal literature with their vachana poetry, a stylised form of spoken language, more popular in folk genres. The popular growth of Veerashaiva (devotees of the Hindu god Shiva) literature began in the 12th century, while Vaishnava (devotees of the Hindu god Vishnu) writers began to exert their influence from the 15th century. Jain writers had to reinvent their art, moving away from the traditional themes of renunciation and tenets to focus on contemporary topics. Andayya's 13th-century classic Kabbigara Kava ('Poets Defender') was an early example of the change in literary style, and also reflected the hostility toward the Veerashaivas; the Jain author found it ideal to narrate the story of Manmatha, the God of Love, who turned Shiva into a half woman. The Veerashaivas had initiated an important change, casting aside the concept of formal literature and making way for shorter local genres. The Vaishnava haridasas later popularised musical forms that were more acceptable to the common man. Written classics eulogising kings and commanders were a thing of the past. Kannada literature had moved closer to the spoken and sung folk traditions, with singability being its hallmark, and devotion to God its goal.

This significant shift in the literary landscape was coupled with major political changes that were taking place in southern India in the early 14th century. With the decline of the regional Hindu kingdoms, the Vijayanagara Empire had risen as a bulwark against Muslim incursions from the north while creating an atmosphere conducive to development of the fine arts. In an important age of Kannada literature, competition between Vaishnava and Veerashaiva writers came to the fore. Literary disputations between the two sects were common, especially in the court of King Deva Raya II. Acute rivalry led to "organised processions" in honour of the classics written by poets of the respective sects. With the exception of the best-known writers from these faiths, many authors produced lesser quality writings with a sectarian and propagandist bent.

The Vaishnava writers consisted of two groups who seemed to have no interaction with each other: the Brahmin commentators who typically wrote under the patronage of royalty; and the Bhakti (devotion) poets who played no role in courtly matters, instead taking the message of God to the people in the form of melodious songs composed using folk genres. Kumara Vyasa and Timmanna Kavi were well known among the Brahmin commentators, while Purandara Dasa and Kanaka Dasa were the most famous of the Bhakti writers. The philosophy of Madhvacharya, which originated in the Kannada–speaking region in the 13th century, spread beyond its borders over the next two centuries. The itinerant haridasas, best described as mystic saint-poets, spread the philosophy of Madhvacharya in simple Kannada, winning mass appeal by preaching devotion to God and extolling the virtues of jnana (enlightenment), bhakti (devotion) and vairagya (detachment).

This was the age of the shatpadi metre, although only the most skilled of poets, such as Chamarasa, Kumara Vyasa, Kanaka Dasa and Bhaskara used it to the best effect. Mentioned for the first time in Kannada literature by Nagavarma I in his Chhandombudhi (c. 990) and successfully used by the 12th century Hoysala poet Raghavanka, this hexa-metre style suited for narrative poetry found immense popularity throughout the Vijayanagara period. The shataka metre (string of 100 verses) was put to best use by the Veerashaivas who produced most of the didactic writings in this metre, although the Jain poet Ratnakaravarni is the most famous exponent of it. The writings of Ratnakaravarni and Kanaka Dasa in sangatya metre are considered masterpieces from this period.

In the royal courts, there was increased interaction between Kannada and Telugu literatures, continuing a trend which had begun in the Hoysala period. Translations of classics from Kannada to Telugu and vice versa became popular. Well-known bilingual poets of this period were Bhima Kavi, Piduparti Somanatha and Nilakanthacharya. Some Telugu poets, including Dhurjati, were so well versed in Kannada that they freely used many Kannada terms in their Telugu writings. It was because of this "familiarity" with Kannada language that the notable writer Srinatha called his Telugu writings "Kannada". Translations by bilingual writers continued in the centuries to follow.

With the disintegration of the Vijayanagara Empire in the late 16th and early 17th centuries, the centres of Kannada literature moved to the courts of the emerging independent kingdoms, the Kingdom of Mysore and the Keladi Nayakas. Writers in these courts, many of whom were Veerashaiva by faith, were not only adept in Kannada but often also in Sanskrit and/or Telugu. Two such writers were Kalale Nanjaraja and Kempe Gowda, the founder of Bangalore. This multi-linguality was perhaps a lingering legacy of the cosmopolitan Vijayanagara literary culture and the emerging social responsibilities of the Veerashaiva monastic order which no longer confined itself to a Kannada only audience, but rather sought to spread its influence across southern India.

In the Kingdom of Mysore, the Veerashaiva literary school was challenged by the growing influence of the Srivaishnava intelligentsia in the Wodeyar court. The Srivaishnava writers (followers of a sect of Vaishnavism) of Kannada literature were also in competition with Telugu and Sanskrit writers, their predominance continuing into the English colonial rule over the princely state of Mysore. Meanwhile, the radical writings of 16th-century poet Ratnakaravarni had made way for a new kind of poetry heralded by those who were not poets in the traditional courtly sense, rather itinerant poets who travelled across the Kannada-speaking region, cutting across court and monastery, writing poems (in the tripadi metre) and influencing the lives of people with their humanistic values which overcame the social barriers of caste and religion. Sarvajna (often compared to Telugu poet Vemana), Sisunala Sherif, Mupina Sadakshari, Navalingayogi and Kadakolada Madivalappa are the best-known among them. These maverick poets heralded yet another epoch of unconventional literature in Kannada language, free of courtly conservatism and established literary tastes.

=== Vaishnava writings ===
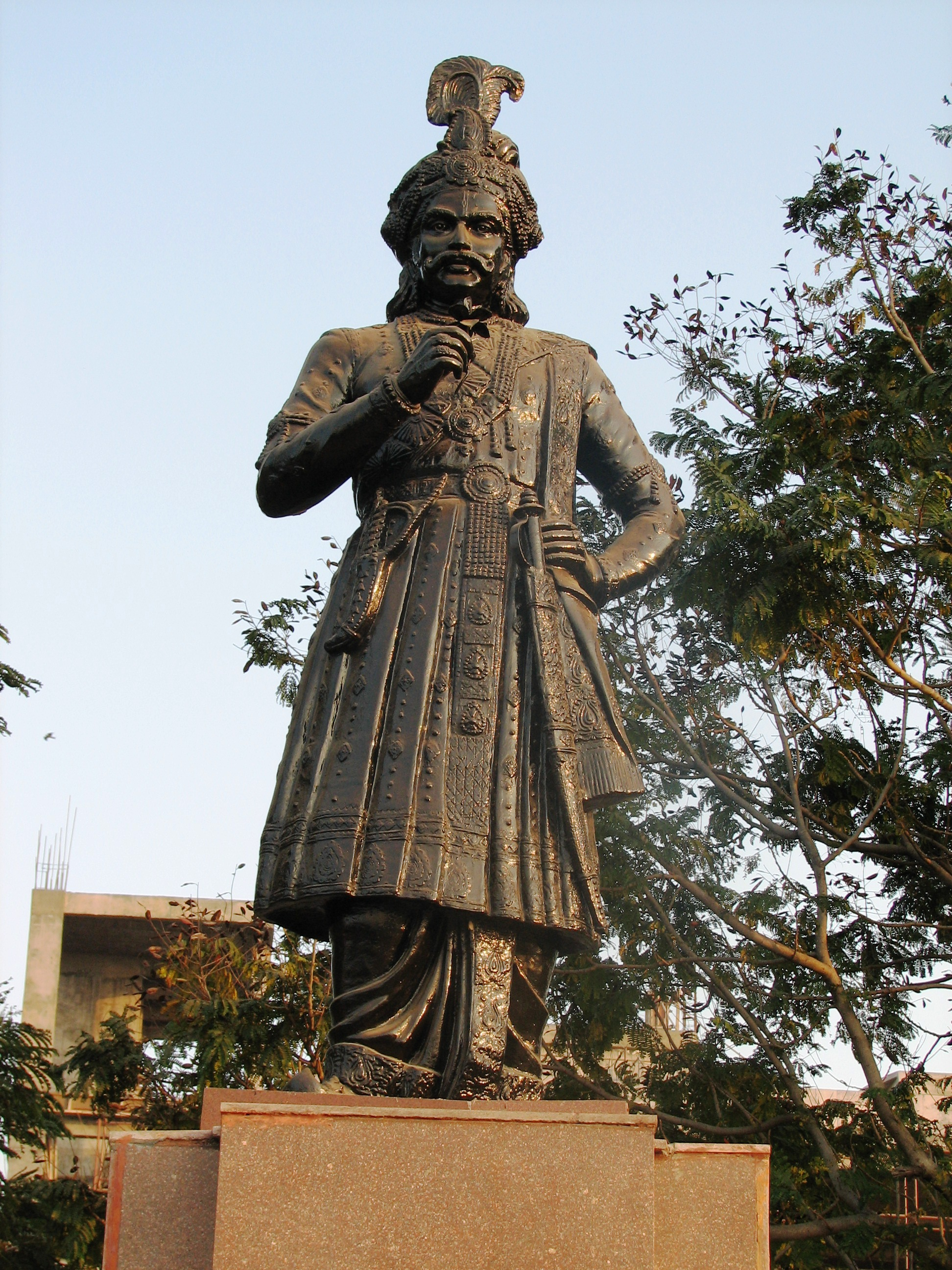
Patron of Vaishnava literature, King Krishnadeva Raya (1509–1529)

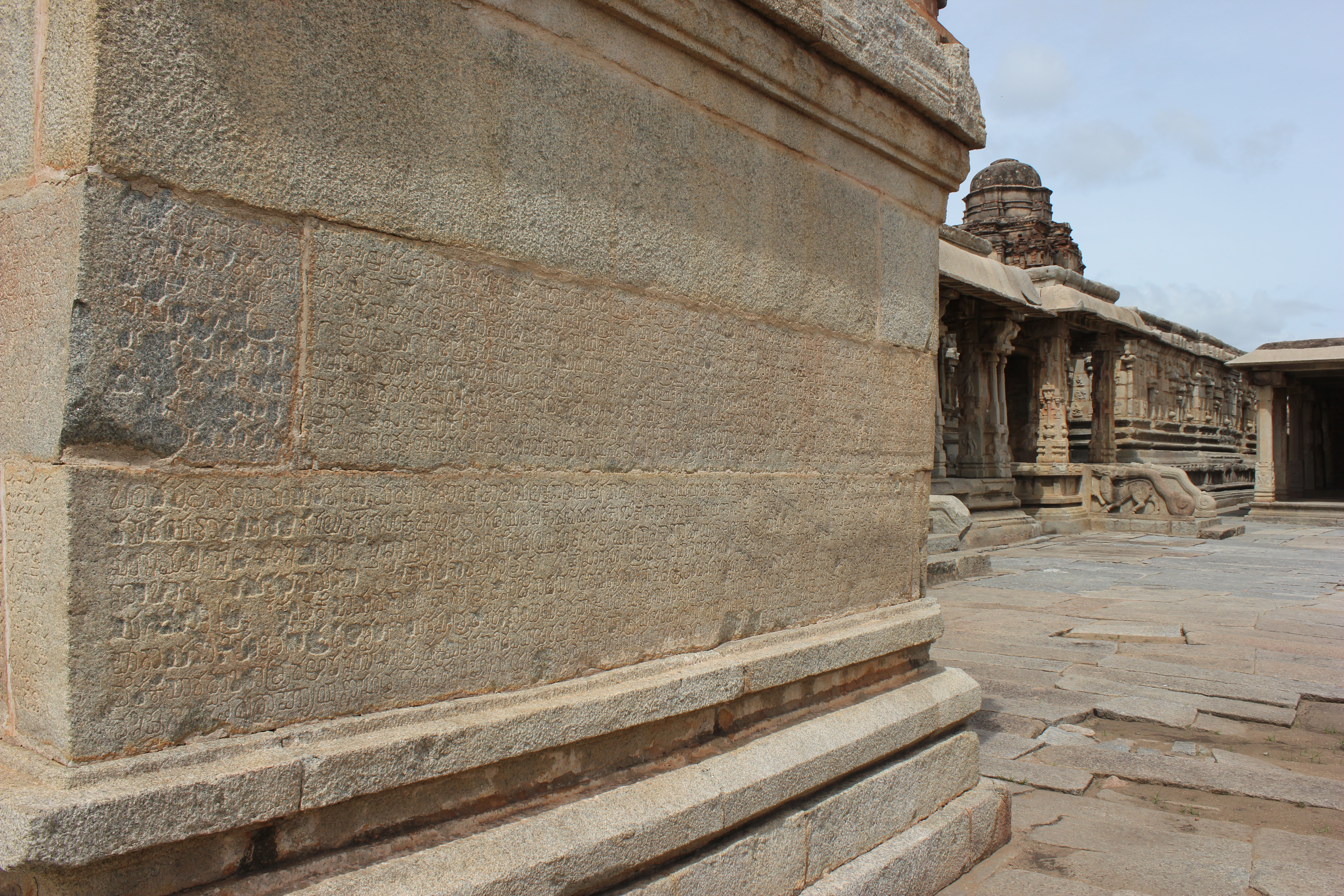
Kannada inscription of King Krishnadeva Raya dated 1513 AD, a danashasana (grant record) on shrine wall at the Krishna temple in Hampi

Vaishnava authors wrote treatments of the Hindu epics, the Ramayana, the Mahabharata and the Bhagavata, as well as the Vedanta and other subjects from the Hindu puranic traditions. This was the age of Kumara Vyasa, an influential Vaishnava poet and a doyen of medieval Kannada epic poetry. Historians have drawn parallels between Adikavi Pampa (c. 941) and Kumaraya Vyasa, while identifying fundamental differences in their style. Both are considered masters of their respective periods; while Pampa is identified as a stylist of the classical age, Kumara Vyasa is considered a generalist of the medieval age. Unlike Pampa, a product of the marga (Sanskritic-mainstream) period of Kannada literature, Kumara Vyasa successfully wielded the flexibility of the desi (native) shatpadi metre, which used a range of language that included metaphors, similes, humour and even vulgarity.

Kumara Vyasa wrote Gadugina Bharata in 1430 in the Vyasa tradition. The title of the work is a reference to Gadagu (modern Gadag), where the author lived. The writing is based on the first ten chapters of the Hindu epic Mahabharata and is also alternatively titled Karnata Bharata Kathamanjari or Kumaravyasa Bharata. It is a dedication to the deity of Gadag and emphasises the divinity and grace of the Hindu god Krishna. Unlike Pampa, who adhered to a strictly Jain interpretation of the epic in his Vikramarjuna Vijaya (941), eulogising Pandava Arjuna as the hero, making Draupadi solely Arjuna's wife and casting the Kaurava prince Duryodhana and his loyal companion Karna as lofty individuals, Kumara Vyasa portrays all characters with the exception of Krishna as deeply human with foibles. His depiction of the secondary characters, such as the cunning Keechaka and the coward Uttara Kumara, is also noteworthy. An interesting aspect of the work is the sense of humour exhibited by the poet and his hero, Krishna. This work marks the transition in Kannada literature from old to modern. Particularly known for his use of sophisticated metaphors, Kumara Vyasa earned the title Rupaka Samrajya Chakravarti ('Emperor of the Land of Metaphors'). The remaining chapters of the epic were translated by Timmanna Kavi (1510) of the court of King Krishnadevaraya. The poet named his work Krishnaraya Bharata after his patron king. Airavata (1430) by Kumara Vyasa recounts an episode from the Mahabharata and is a story of the elephant ridden by god Indra.

Inspired by Kumara Vyasa, the first complete brahminical adaptation of the epic Ramayana was written by Kumara Valmiki (a pseudonym of Narahari, 1500) and is called Torave Ramayana after the village Torave, where it was composed. As with the Mahabharata, this adaptation veers away from the Jain version by Nagachandra (1105). Nagachandra had used the champu metre popular in Sanskrit works and sought to portray Ravana as a tragic hero. In a departure from the original version (by Valmiki), the Jain epic ends with Rama's asceticism and nirvana. Kumara Valmiki's account, written in the Valmiki tradition, is in the shatpadi metre and is steeped in the author's devotion for the god Rama, an incarnation of the god Vishnu. According to the author, the epic he wrote was actually a recounting of Shiva's conversation with his consort Parvati. In this version of the epic, King Ravana, the villain, is one of the suitors at Sita's Swayamvara (a ceremony of "choice of a husband"). His failure in winning the bride's hand results in jealousy towards Rama, the eventual bridegroom. As the story progresses, Hanuman, for all his services, is heaped with encomium and is exalted to the status of "the next creator". At the end of the story, during the war with Rama, Ravana realises that Rama is none other than the god Vishnu and hastens to die at his hands to achieve salvation. The chapter narrating the war (Yuddhakanda) is given prominence over all other chapters. The writing has remained popular for centuries and inspired folk theatre such as the Yakshagana, which draws from episodes of Torave Ramayana for enactment. The influence of the Puranic tradition and that of Madhvacharya are visible in this lively yet religious narration that uses every opportunity to glorify its hero, Rama. However, the author has been criticised for dwelling in abstractions and for not reaching the graceful poetic level of his predecessor Kumara Vyasa.

The early Bhagavata writings in Sanskrit by well-known acharyas (gurus) were solely meant to have a proselytising effect on the masses, encouraging them to a theistic way of life and belief in the god Krishna. Chatu Vitthalanatha, who flourished as a court poet of King Krishnadeva Raya and his successor King Achyuta Raya, was the first to translate the Bhagavata into Kannada in a voluminous writing comprising 12,247 stanzas divided into 280 sections. The work covered the entire original version in shatpadi metre. Two other names appear in the colophons, Sadananda Yati and Nityatma Sukayogi, prompting some scholars to attribute the work to the group while others consider them alternate names of the same writer. The work covers all ten avatars of the god Vishnu, though it is essentially centred on the depiction of Krishna as the supreme Lord. The purana covers stories of Vishnu's famous devotees such as Prahlad and Dhruva in detail, as well as stories of demons Vritasura, Hiranyakashipu and others who sought to attain salvation by dying at the hands of Vishnu. Most noteworthy is the epic's influence on the compositions of the Haridasas. Though the writing is not considered as important as the other two epics of the period, its significance to religiously minded people is well accepted. Chatu Vitthalanatha wrote a fuller version of portions of the epic Mahabharata as well. Other notable writers of the 16th century were Tirumala Bhatta (Siva Gite) and Ramendra (Saundarya Katharatna, using tripadi metre).

=== Veerashaiva writings ===
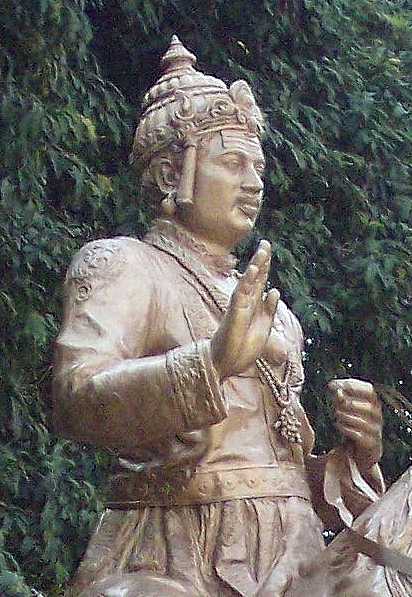
Basavanna, protagonist of many a Veerashaiva biography

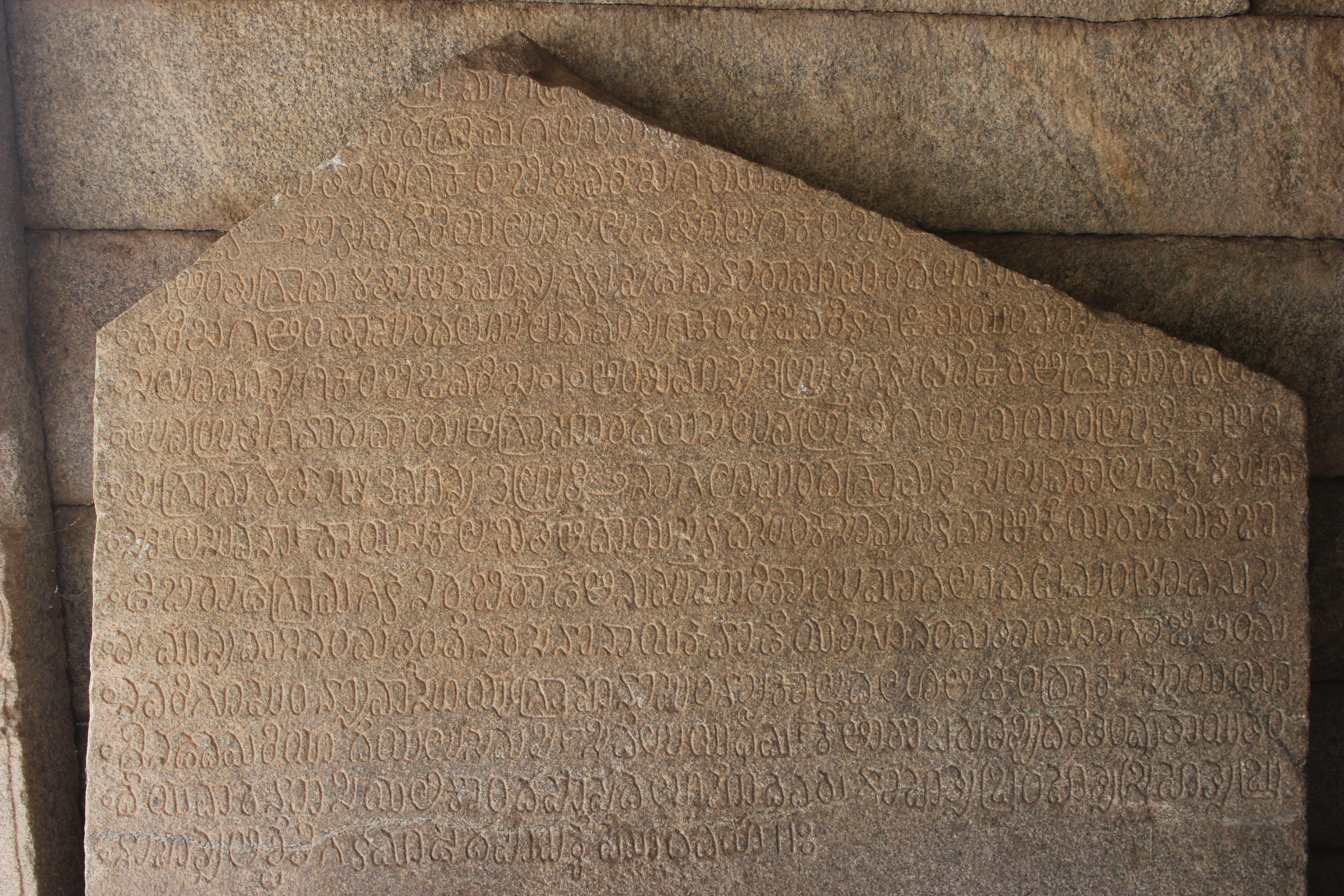
Kannada grant inscription of King Krishnadeva Raya dated 1509 A.D., in the Prasanna (underground) Virupaksha temple describes grants made to the 14th-century temple

The Veerashaiva writers were devotees of the Hindu god Shiva, his 25 forms, and the expositions of Shaivism. An important development in their literature during this period was the recasting the saints of the 12th century Veerashaiva movement (Basavanna, Allama Prabhu and others) as the protagonists of their writings.

Bhima Kavi paved the way for the shatpadi metre tradition in his work Basavapurana (c.1369), a form first experimented with by the 12th century Hoysala poet Raghavanka. Bhima Kavi's work, a biography of Basavanna, is an important Veerashaiva purana. It was inspired by earlier biographies of Basavanna by the Hoysala poet Harihara (the author of the first biographical narrative poem of the protagonist's life called Basavaraja Ragale) and the Telugu writings of Palkuriki Somanatha of the 13th century. Bhima Kavi humbly acknowledges and eulogises his predecessors in a writing full of well-known personalities.

The author starts with Basavanna's birth and weaves episodes of other famous sharanas (devotees of Hindu god Shiva)—such as Allama Prabhu—into his life history. Basavanna is depicted as a saintly person, a great devotee of Shiva, an incarnation of Nandi, a man of miracles and one with a mission, sent to re-establish the Veerashaiva faith on earth. The work is arranged into eight aswasas (divisions) containing sixty-one sandhis (chapters) and 3,621 verses. The narration includes stories of devotees of Shiva who overcame their egos. Apart from a few variations, the writings of Bhima Kavi and his predecessors are complementary. Two lost works of Bhima Kavi are the Bhimakaviswara Ragale and the Bhringidandaka.

Chamarasa, Lakkanna Dandesa and Jakkanarya flourished under the patronage of King Deva Raya II. Chamarasa, champion of the Veerashaiva faith, was a rival of Kumara Vyasa in the court of King Deva Raya II. His magnum opus, the Prabhulinga Lile (1430) was a eulogy of 12th-century saint Allama Prabhu; it was translated into Telugu and Tamil language at the behest of his patron king, and later into the Sanskrit and Marathi languages. In the story, the saint is considered an incarnation of Hindu god Ganapathi while Parvati took the form of a princess of Banavasi. In stark contrast to Kumara Vyasa's war-torn epic, Chamarasa delivered a writing full of spirituality. A remark made by the poet in the writing, that his story is "not about ordinary Sivatattva Ratnakara mortals", implied that the Vaishnava epics the Ramayana and the Mahabharata were about mortals; this was evidence of rivalry between the two faiths.

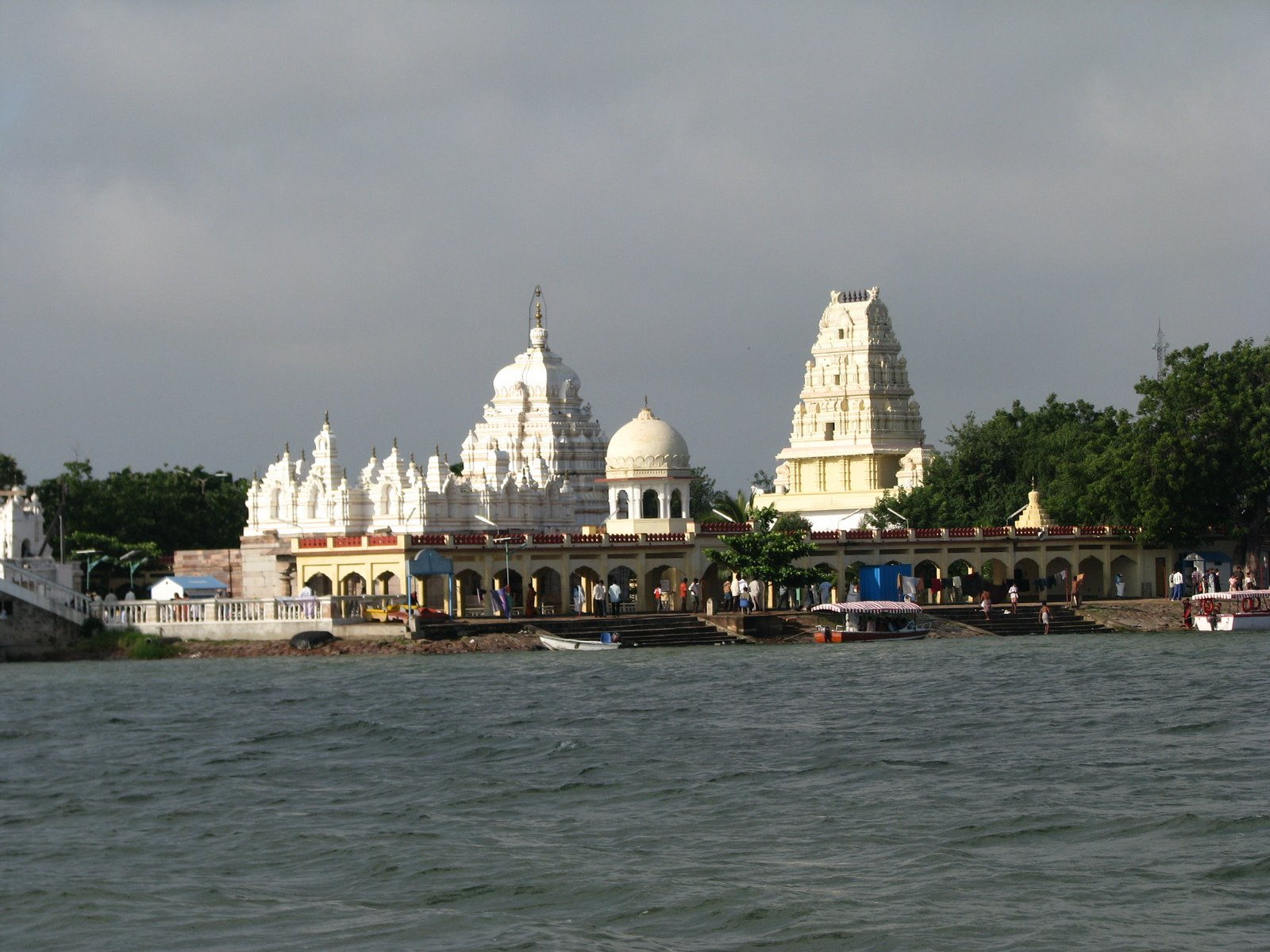
Samādhi (mausoleum) of 12th century Veerashaiva social reformer Basavanna at Kudala Sangama in Karnataka

Lakkanna Dandesa, the king's prime minister and provincial governor, wrote an encyclopedia on the beliefs and rites of the Veerashaiva faith titled Sivatattva Chintamani. This work is an account of the life of Basavanna, the progenitor of the faith, and hundreds of his followers, making it valuable material for students of the Lingayat movement. Numerous references are made in this work to the capital city of Vijayanagara and its suburbs. Jakkanarya, a minister in the court, not only wrote Nurondusthala (one hundred and one stories) but also was patron to Kumarabanka Natha and Mahalinga Deva, poet-saints who wrote vachana poems and books on the Shaiva philosophy (called shatsthala). Other writers of the 15th century worthy of mention are Kavi Linga (1490), court poet of King Saluva Narasimha I, Adrisappa (Praudaraya Charitra), Bommarasa (Soundara Purana), Kallarasa (Janavasya), Chaturmukha Bommarasa (Revanasiddhesvara Purana), Suranga Kavi (Trisashti Puratanara Charitre), and Nilakanthacharya (Aradhya Charitra), court poet of the Ummattur chieftain Virananjendra.

In 1500, inspired by Palkuriki Somanatha (a bilingual poet in Kannada and Telugu), Singiraja synthesised an account on the life of Basavanna titled Maha Basavaraja Charitra (or Singiraja Purana), using the protagonist's vachana poems and giving details of his 88 famous deeds, as well as information about his opponents in the court of Southern Kalachuri King Bijjala II. An eminent poet of this time was Guru Basava, known for his authorship of seven famous poems (Sapta Kavya), all but one being written in the shatpadi metre. He expounded on religious teachings in the form of formal discussions between the guru and disciple. His kavyas (classical epic poems) deal with spiritualism and extrasensory perception.

Mallanarya of Gubbi, a poet bilingual in Kannada and Sanskrit, enjoyed the patronage of King Krishnadeva Raya. His important writings in Kannada in the shatpadi metre are the Bhava Chintaratna (also called Satyendra Chole Kathe, 1513) and the Virasaivamrita Purana (1530). The former was based on a 7th-century Tamil work and about a Chola King in the context of the Shaiva faith; the latter is a writing of encyclopedic proportions that goes beyond philosophical content, describing the various forms (or sports, called lila) of god Shiva and the lives of famous Shaiva saints.

In 1584, Virupaksha Pandita, the head priest at the Virupaksha Temple in Vijayanagara, wrote an account on the life and deeds of the 12th-century saint and vachana poet Chennabasava. The writing, titled Chenna Basava Purana, regards the protagonist as an incarnation of god Shiva and describes the glory of Shiva and his famous devotees. The book gives valuable information, including dates, about early Veerashaiva saints and vachanakaras (vachana poets). In addition to religious content, the writing provides useful insights about the former capital Vijayanagara, its royal palace, its market places and merchants, its military encampments, specialisations and divisions and the guilds of workers who served the military in various capacities. Other authors from the 16th century were Chermanka (Chermanka Kavya), Virabhadraraja (Virabhadra Vijaya), Chennabasavanka (Mahadevi Akkanna Purana), Nanjunda of Ikkeri (Bhairavaesvara Kavya) and Sadasiva Yogi (Ramanatha Vilasa).

=== Jain writings ===
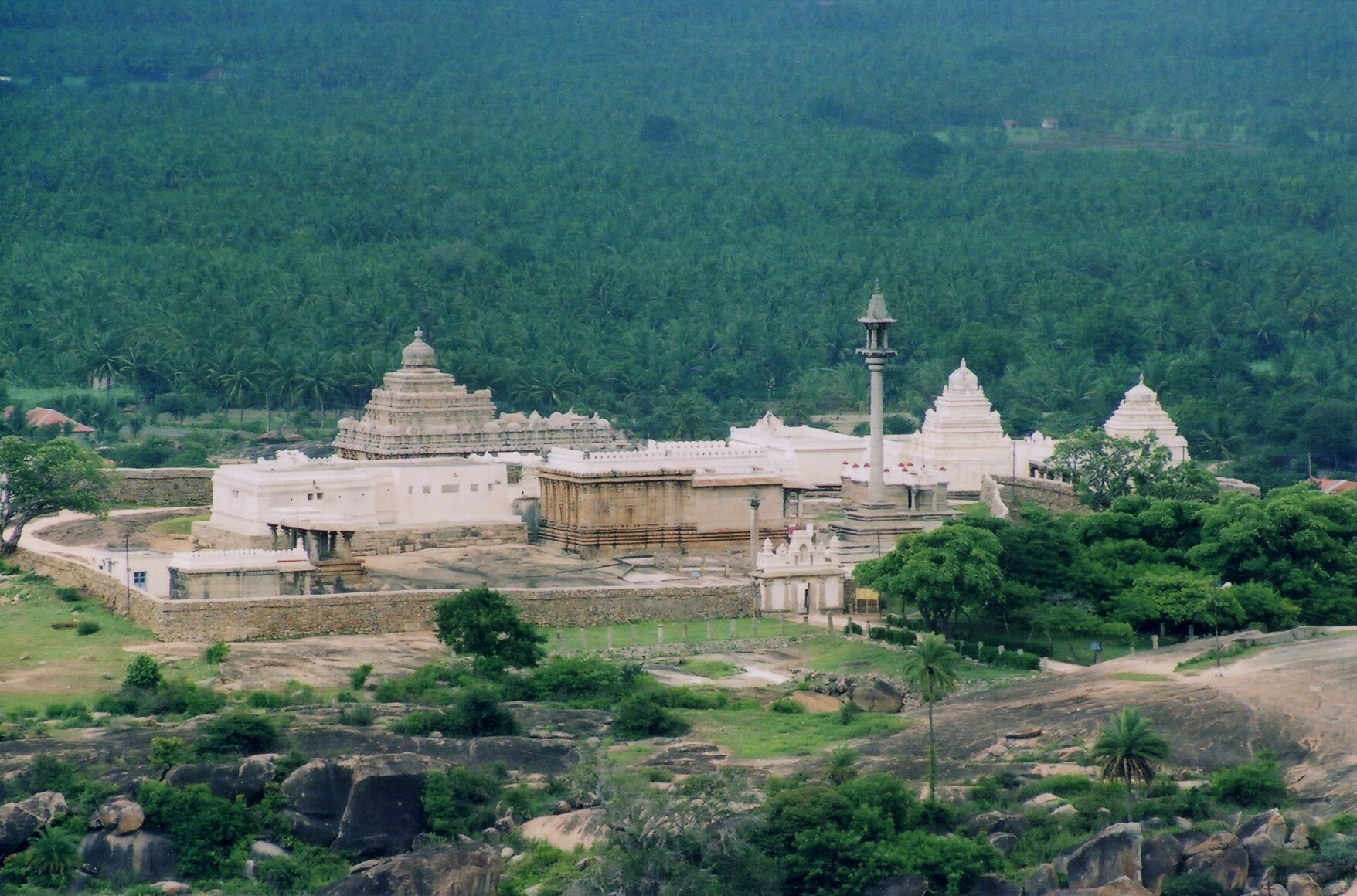
Jain temple complex at Chandragiri hill, Shravanabelagola, the centre of Jainism in Karnataka since 3rd century BCE

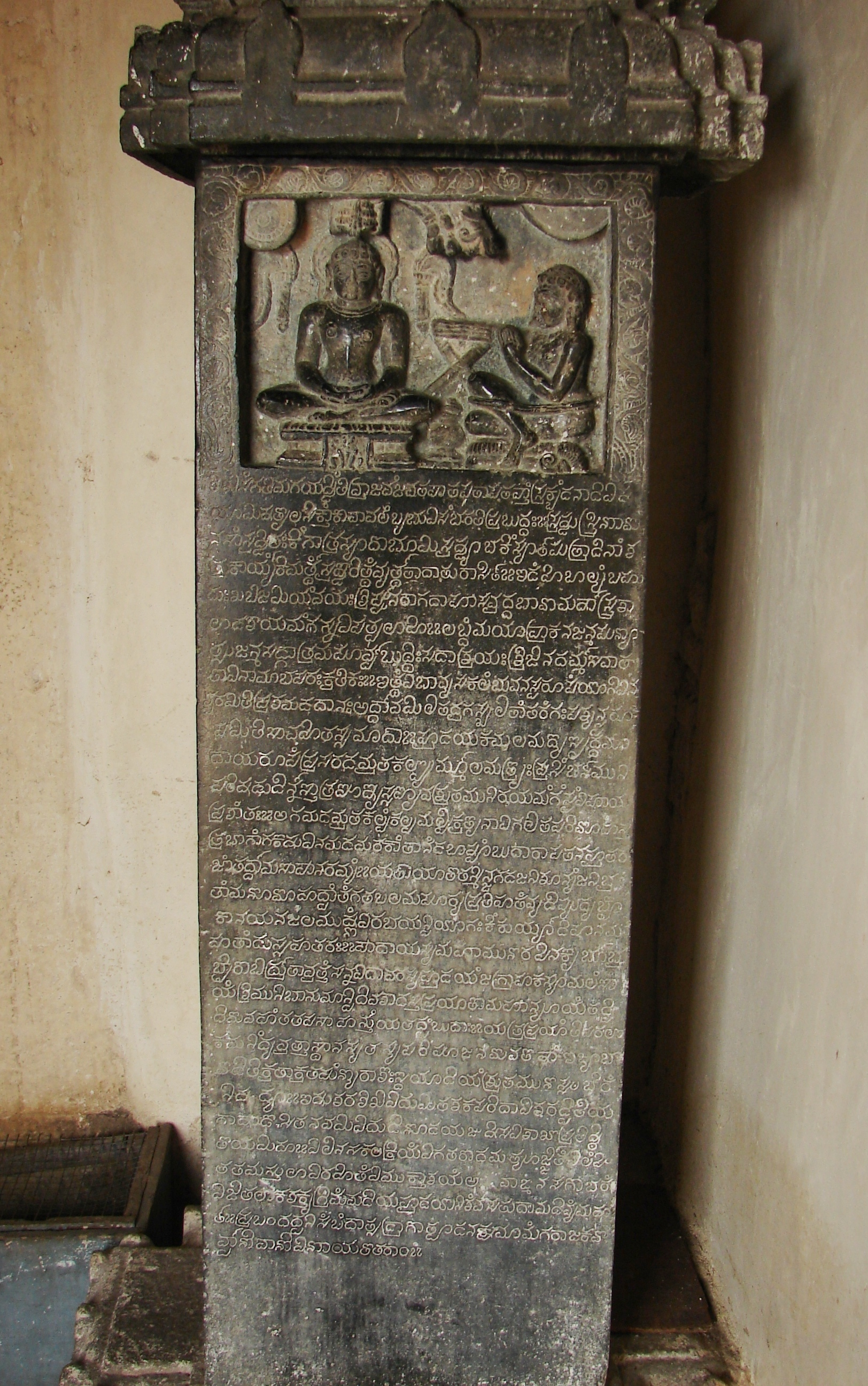
Poetic inscription in Kannada by Vijayanagara poet Manjaraja (1398) at Shravanabelagola

The cultural supremacy of the Jains steadily diminished from the 12th century; the decline began in the 10th century after the conquest of the predominantly Jain Rashtrakutas by the Western Chalukya Empire, and the defeat of the Ganga kingdom by the Cholas of Tanjore. While Veerashaivism flourished in northern Karnataka from the time of Basavanna, Sri Vaishnavism (a branch of Vaishnavism) thrived in the South due to the influence of Ramanujacharya. The Hoysala king Vishnuvardhana and his descendants took to Vaishnavism. Though tolerant of all faiths, the founders of the Vijayanagara Empire and the succeeding kings of the Sangama dynasty were Shaivas by faith (devotees of Shiva) while the later Tuluva dynasty kings were Sri Vaishnavas (followers of Sri Vaishnavism). The Jain population appears to have begun its decline from this period; however, available records include a decree by King Bukka Raya I giving Jains freedom of worship, following their complaint of persecution. Although the influence of Jainism and its literature was on the wane, the coastal areas of modern Karnataka, where important Jain monuments and monoliths were constructed, remained a stronghold. As in earlier centuries, Jain authors wrote about tirthankars, princes and other personages important to the Jain religion. Most famous among Jain poets from the coastal Karnataka region were Ratnakaravarni, Abhinava Vadi Vidyananda, Salva and Nemanna.

Ratnakaravarni of Mudabidri (1557), court poet at Karkala under the patronage of Bhairasa Wodeyar, is famous for successfully integrating an element of worldly pleasure into asceticism and for treating the topic of eros with discretion in a religious epic, his magnum opus the Bharatadesa Vaibhava. One of the most popular poets of Kannada literature, Ratnakaravarni's writings were popular across religions and sects. He appears to have had tense relationships with both court and monastery, however, owing to writings on erotics and the science of pleasure, rather than purely spiritual poetry. A radical and sensitive poet, he once claimed that spiritual meditation "was boring". Tradition has it that Ratnakaravarni converted to Veerashaivism when his Bharatadesa Vaibhava (also called Bharatesvara Charite) was initially scorned, later to return to the Jain fold and pen other important writings. The Bharatadesa Vaibhava is written in eighty cantos and includes 10,000 verses. His other important writings include the 2,000 spiritual songs called Annagalapada ('Songs of the Brothers') and the three shatakas: the Ratnakara sataka, the Aparajitesvara shataka (a discourse on Jain morals, renunciation and philosophy) and the Trilokya shataka, an account of the universe as seen by Jains, consisting of heaven, hell and the intermediate worlds.

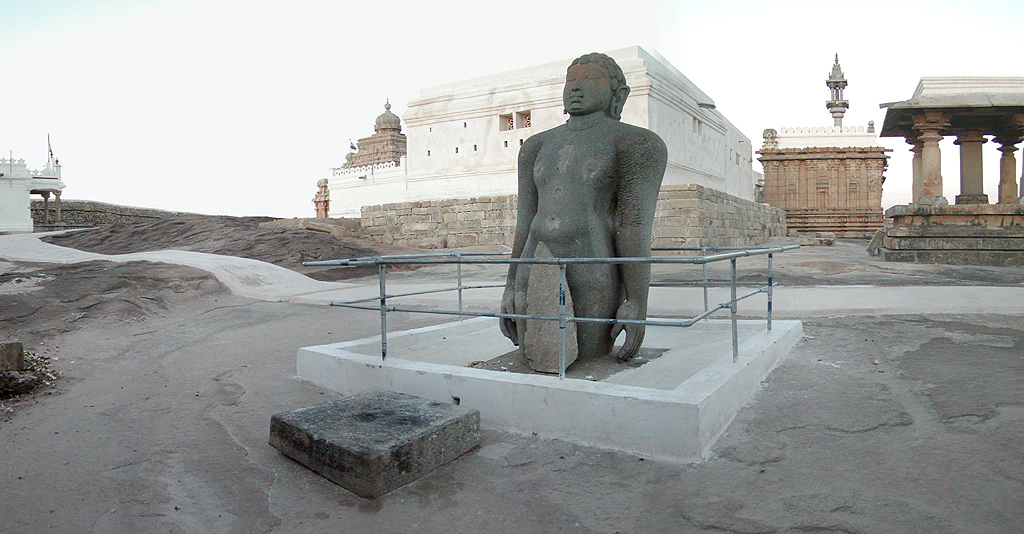
Saint Bharata at Chandragiri hill complex in Shravanabelagola

Bharatadesa Vaibhava is a version of the earlier Poorvapurana by Jinasenacharya and reflects a different perspective than the Adipurana written by Adikavi Pampa c. 941. Centred on the glorification of the enlightened Bharata, the son of the first Jain tirthankar Adinatha, Ratnakaravarni cleverly focuses on those aspects that the original by Pampa ignored. Ratnakaravarni goes into minute detail about prince Bharata who, according to the author, serves as the ideal balance between detachment (yoga) and attachment (bhoga). Though married to "96,000 women", Bharata is depicted as one who at once could separate himself from worldly pleasures. Unlike Pampa, who focused on the conflict between the brothers Bahubali and Bharata, ending with Bahubali's asceticism and Bharata's humiliation, Ratnakaravarni's eulogy of Bharata leaves room only for Bahubali's evolution towards sainthood. Eventually, Bharata attains moksha (liberation from the cycle of death and rebirth) by burning himself in ascetic fire. The author showers encomium on Bharata in his various roles as monarch, husband, son, friend and devotee, a rare description of a "perfect human being" among Jain writings. Since details of the early life of Bharata as a young ruler did not exist in previous writings or in tradition, much of Ratnakaravarni's vivid description of that period was a product of his imagination. This work finds its pride of place in Kannada's epic poetry as the longest poem in the folk sangatya metre.

Salva (1550), who was the court poet of a Konkan prince named Salvamalla, wrote a propagandist work called the Salva Bharata. This was a Jain version of the epic Mahabharata in sixteen parvas (divisions), intended to compete with the Vaishnava version of the epic written by Kumar Vyasa in the mid-15th century. Abhinava Vadi Vidyananda of Gerosoppa (1553) wrote Kavya Sara, a 1,143 verse anthology of extracts of subjects written about by earlier poets between 900 and 1430. The text closely resembles an anthology written by Hoysala poet Mallikarjuna (1245), with some additions to account for writings in the post Mallikarjuna era. A staunch Jain and a disputant, Vidyananda argued for the cause of his faith in the Vijayanagara court and other provincial courts. Nemanna (1559) wrote Jnana Bhaskara Charite on the importance of inner contemplation rather than rituals as the correct path towards emancipation.

In Vijayanagara, Madhura was the court poet of King Harihara II and King Deva Raya I under the patronage of their respective prime ministers. He is famous for his account of the 15th tirthankar titled Dharmanatha Purana (1385), written in a style similar to that of Jain poets of earlier centuries. Madhura is also credited with a poem about Gomateshwara of Shravanabelagola. Ayata Varma, who is tentatively dated to 1400, translated from Sanskrit a champu (mixed prose-verse) titled Ratna Karandaka describing Jain ideologies. Manjarasa, a feudatory king of Kallahalli and a Vijayanagara general of rank, wrote two books. Nemijinesa Sangata, completed in 1508, was an account of the life of the 22nd Jain tirthankar; Samyukta Koumudi, written in 1509, comprised 18 short stories on religious values and morals.

An important shatpadi writing from this period is the Jivandhara Charite (1424) by Bhaskara, a story of Prince Jivanadhara, who regained the throne usurped by his father. Other well-known Jain writers were Kalyanakirti (Jnanachandrabhyudaya, 1439), Santikirtimuni (Santinathacharite, 1440), Vijayanna (Dvadasanuprekshe, 1448), Bommarasa of Terakanambi (Sanatkumara Charite, 1485), Kotesvara (1500), Mangarasa III (Jayanripa Kavya), Santarasa (Yogaratnakara), Santikirti (Santinatha Purana, 1519), Doddayya (Chandraprabha Purana, 1550), Doddananka (Chandraprabha Purana, 1578) and Bahubali Pandita of Sringeri (Dharmanathapuranam, 1352).

=== Secular writings ===
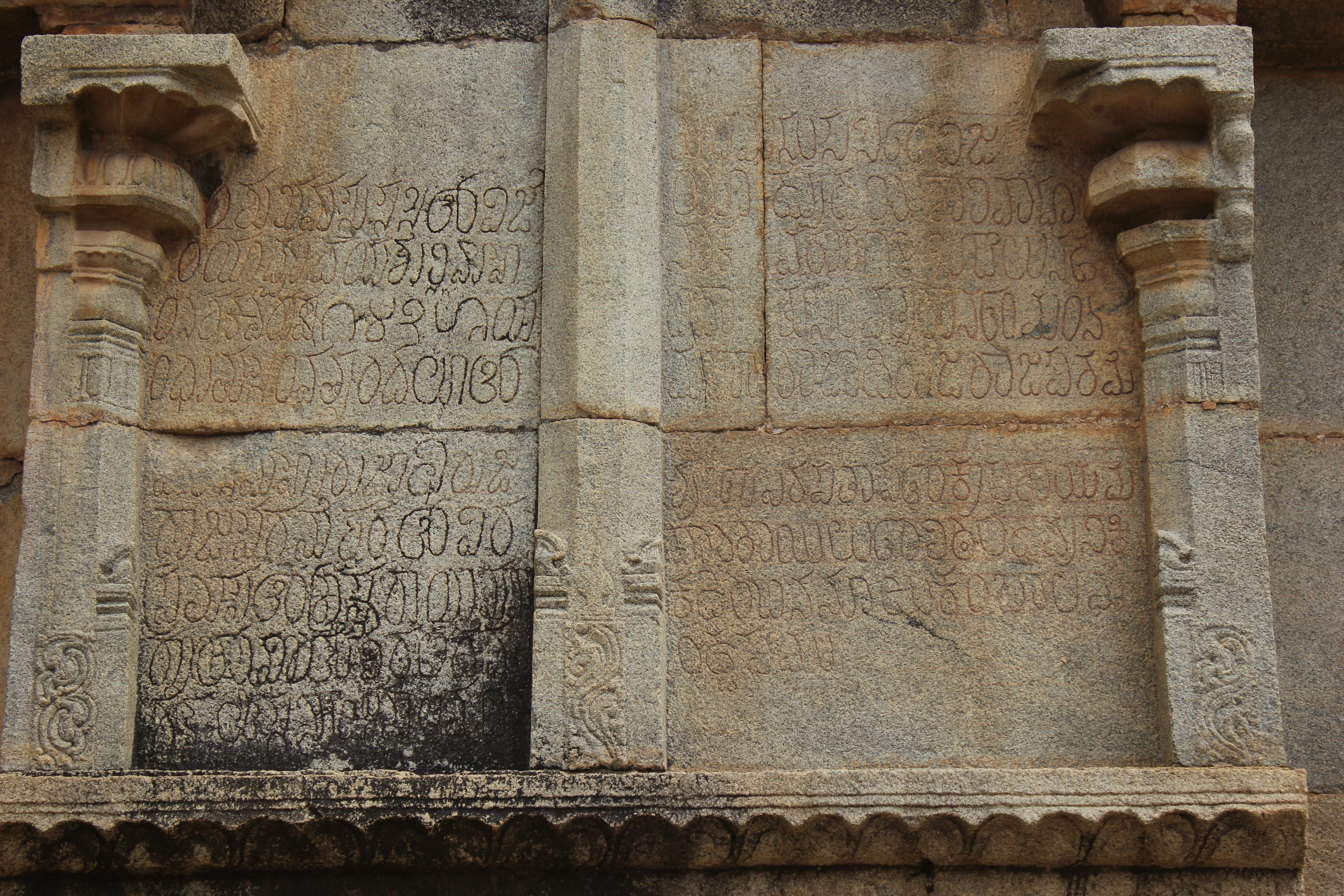
Kannada inscription of King Krishnadeva Raya dated 1516 A.D., at the Vitthala temple in Hampi

Although most of the writings that have survived from this period are religious in nature, there is sufficient literary evidence that secular writing was also popular in the imperial court. Some of these writings carry useful information on urban life, grandeur of the imperial and provincial courts, royal weddings and ceremonies. Other works refer the general town planning, fortifications and ordnance details at Vijayanagara and other important cities, irrigation reservoirs, merchants and shops dealing in a variety of commodities. On occasion, authors dwell on mythical cities that reflect their idealised views on contemporary life. Commonly found in these works are description of artists and professionals and their relationship with the court. These included poets, bards, composers, painters, sculptors, dancers, theatrical performers and even wrestlers. Others who find mention are political leaders, ambassadors, concubines, accountants, goldsmiths, moneylenders and even servants and door keepers.

Writings in various literary genres such as romance, fiction, erotica, folk songs and musical compositions were popular. A wealth of literature dealing in subjects such as astronomy, meteorology, veterinary science and medicine, astrology, grammar, philosophy, poetry, prosody, biography, history and lexicon, as well as dictionaries and encyclopedias, were written in this era.

In 1360, Manjaraja I wrote a book on medicine called Khagendra Mani Darpana, basing it on the 5th century writings of Pujyapada. Padmananka (1385) wrote a biography of his ancestor Kereya Padmarasa, a Hoysala minister and poet, in a work titled Padmaraja Purana. The writing provides details about the Hoysala Empire and notable personalities such as the poets Harihara and Raghavanka. Chandrashekara (or Chrakavi), a court poet of Deva Raya II, wrote an account on the Virupaksha temple, its precincts and settlements at Pampapura (modern Hampi) in the Pampasthana Varnanam in 1430. Mangaraja II authored a lexicon called Mangaraja Nighantu in 1398, while Abhinava Chandra gave an account on veterinary science in his book called Asva Vaidya in the 14th century. Kavi Malla wrote on erotics in the Manmathavijaya in the 14th century. In the 15th century, Madhava translated an earlier Sanskrit poem by Dandi and called it Madhavalankara, and Isvara Kavi (also called Bana Kavi) wrote a prosody called Kavijihva Bandhana.

Deparaja, a member of the royal family, authored Amaruka and a collection of romantic stories called the Sobagina Sone (1410), written in the form of a narration by the author to his wife. However, according to Kotraiah, Sobagina Sone was actually written by King Deva Raya II. The writing contains interesting details on the king's hunting expeditions and on the professional hunters who accompanied him. In 1525, Nanjunda Kavi, a feudatory prince wrote on local history, published a eulogy of prince Ramanatha (also called Kumara Rama) titled Ramanatha Charite (or Kumara Rama Sangatya) in the sangatya metre. The poem is about the prince of Kampili and his heroics at the dawn of the Muslim invasion into southern India. This work combines folk and epic literature. The protagonist rejects the advances of his stepmother, only to be condemned to death. He is rescued by a minister, but eventually achieves martyrdom fighting Muslim invaders at the capital.

In 1567, Jain ascetic Srutakirti of Mysore translated from Sanskrit a biographic poem of a Hoysala lady Vijayakumari in Vijayakumari Charite. The writing goes into detail about a city (believed to be Vijayanagara, the royal capital), discussing its shops, guilds and businesses. The text describes the rigid caste-based human settlements and notes that people involved in mundane duties such as washing, barbering, pot-making and carpentry lived outside the fort walls in streets constructed specifically for them. Salva (1550) authored two poems called Rasa Ratnakar and Sharada Vilas. The former is about rasa (poetical sentiment or flavour) and the latter, only portions of which have been recovered, is about the dhvani (suggested meaning) in poems. Thimma's Navarasalankara of the 16th century also discusses poetical flavour. In the 16th century, lexicons were written by Lingamantri (Kabbigarakaipidi) and Devottama (Nanaratha Ratnakara). At the turn of the 17th century, Bhattakalanka Deva wrote comprehensively on old Kannada grammar. His Karnataka Sabdanusasanam is modelled on the lines of Sanskrit grammar and is considered an exhaustive work.

== Bhakti literature ==
=== Vaishnava writings ===
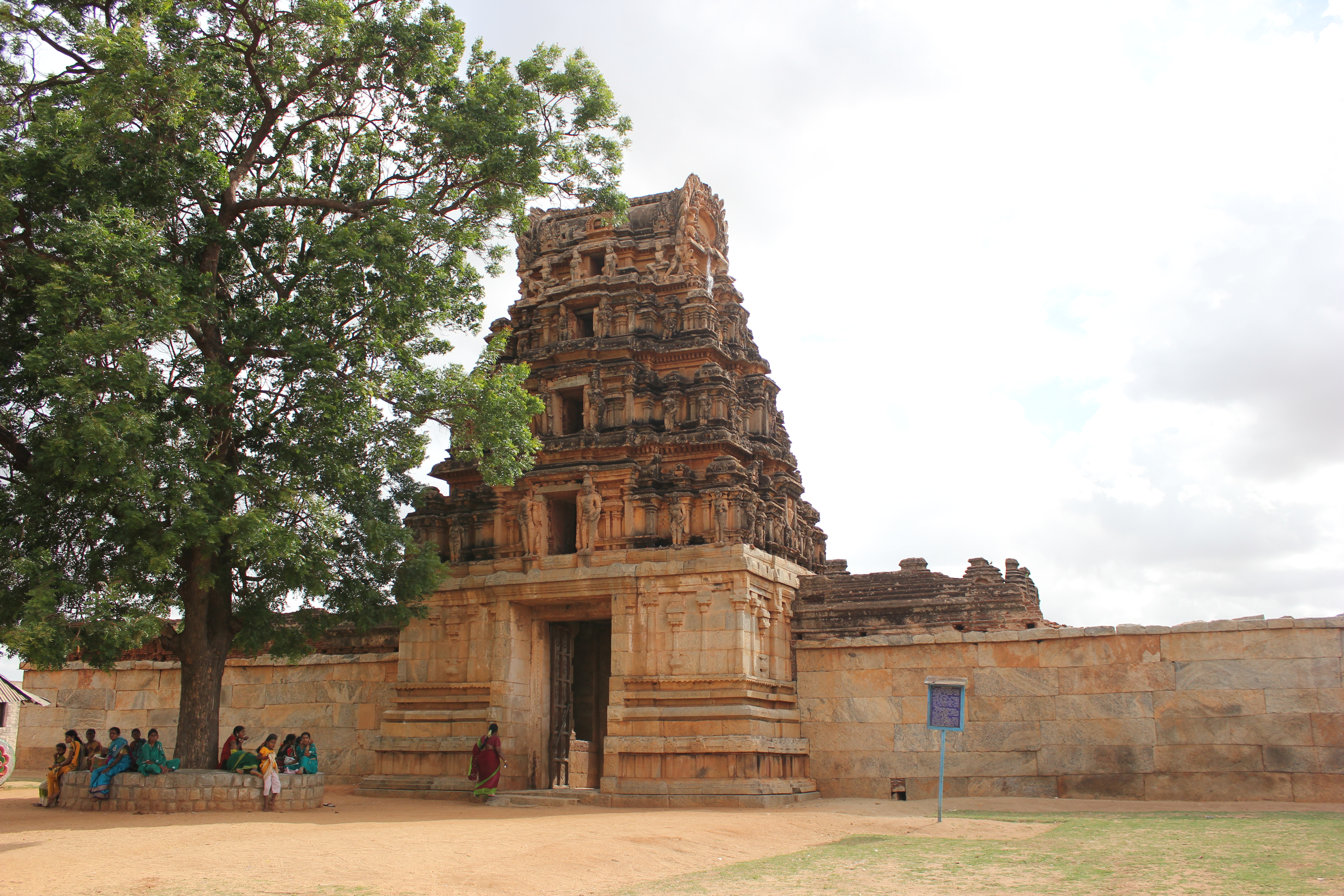
Gopala Krishnaswamy temple was built in 1539 AD, Timmalapura, Bellary district

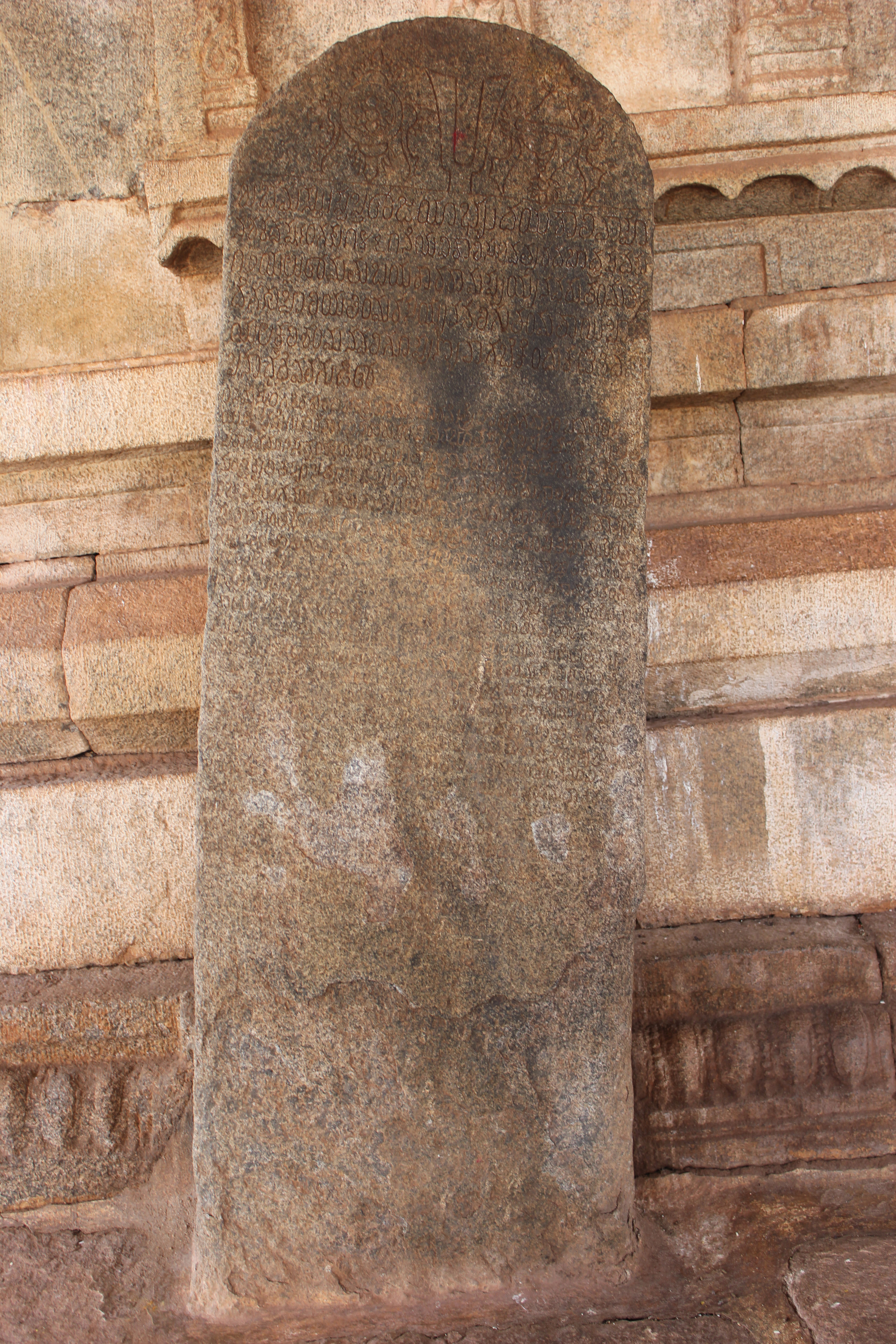
Kannada inscription of 1539 AD at the Gopala Krishnaswamy temple in Timmalapura

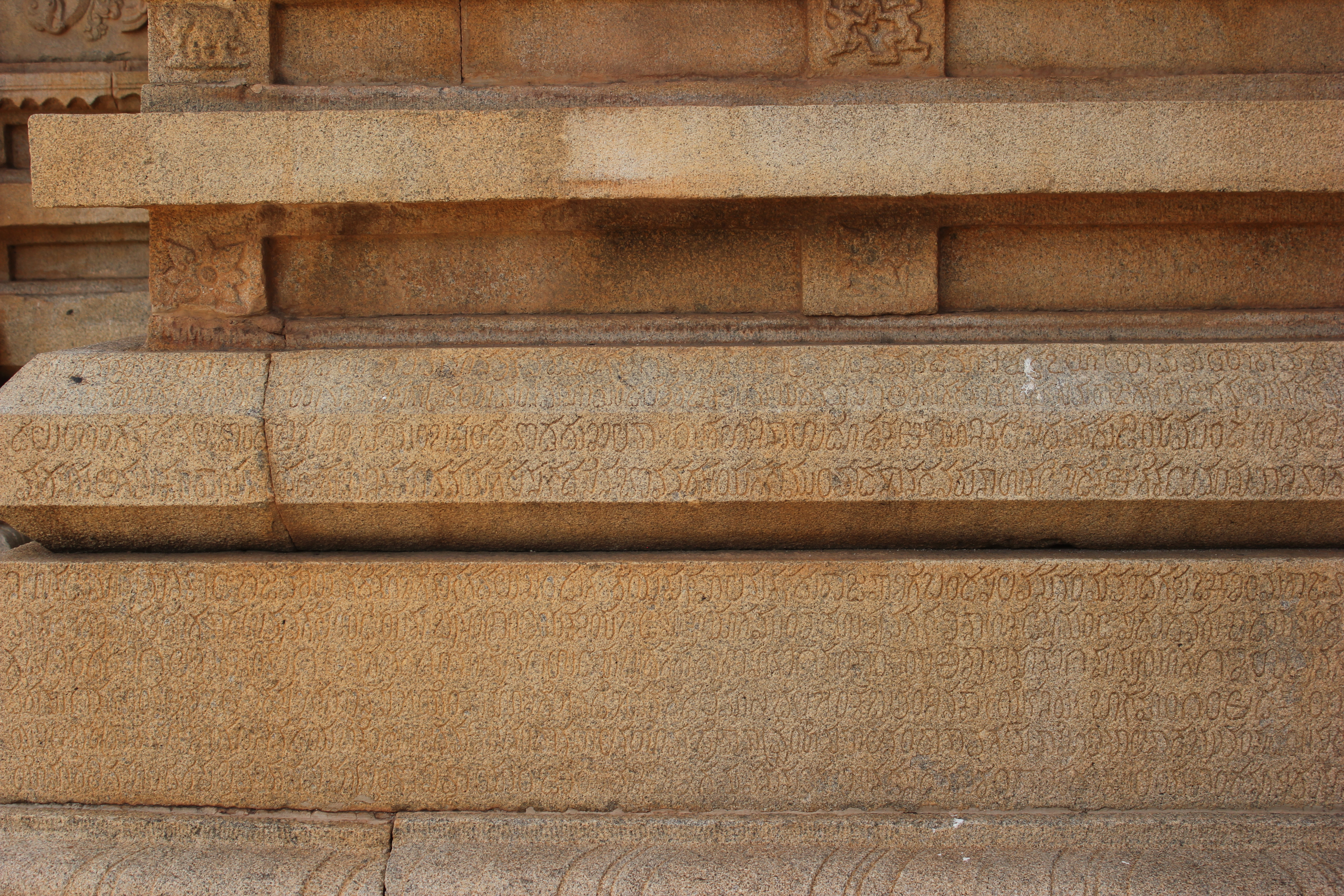
Kannada inscription of King Krishnadeva Raya dated 1521 AD, at the Hazara Rama temple in Hampi

Unlike the Veerashaiva movement which preached devotion to the god Shiva with an insistence on a classless society and had its inspiration from the lower classes of society, the haridasa movement started from the higher echelons and preached devotion to the god Vishnu in a more flexible caste-based society, eventually becoming popular among the common people. The beginnings of the haridasa tradition can be traced to the Vaishnava school of Dvaita philosophy pioneered by Madhvacharya. Its influence on Kannada literature in the early 14th century is seen in the earliest known compositions written by Naraharitirtha, a prominent disciple of Madhvacharya.

The Vaishnava Bhakti (devotional) movement involving well-known haridasas (devotee saints) of the 14th through 16th centuries made an indelible imprint on Kannada literature, with the development of a body of literature called Haridasa Sahitya ('Haridasa Literature'). This philosophy presented another strong current of devotion, pervading the lives of millions, similar to the effects of the Veerashaiva movement of the 12th century. The haridasas conveyed the message of Madhvacharya through esoteric Sanskrit writings (written by Vyasa kuta or Vyasa school) and simple Kannada language compositions, appealing to the common man, in the form of devotional songs (written by the Dasa Kuta or Dasa school). The philosophy of Madhvacharya was spread by eminent disciples such as Naraharitirtha, Jayatirtha, Vyasatirtha, Sripadaraya, Vadirajatirtha, Purandara Dasa, Kanaka Dasa and others.

Compositions in the haridasa literature are sub-divided into four types: kirthane, suladi, ugabhoga and mundige. Kirthanes are devotional musical compositions with refrains based on raga and tala and celebrate the glory of god. The suladi are tala based, the ugabhoga are melody based while the mundige are in the form of riddles. Compositions were also modelled on jogula (lullaby songs) and sobane (marriage songs). A common feature of haridasa compositions are influences from the Hindu epics, the Ramayana, the Mahabharata and Bhagavata.

Haridasa poetry, which faded for a century after the death of Naraharitirtha, resurfaced with Sripadaraya, who was for some time the head of the Madhva matha (monastery of Madhvacharya) at Mulubagilu (in modern Kolar district). About a hundred of his kirthanes have survived, written under the pseudonym "Sriranga Vithala". Sripadaraya is considered a pioneer of this genre of devotional songs. Sripadaraya's disciple, Vyasatirtha (or Vyasaraya), is most famous among the latter day Madhva saints. It was he who created the Vyasa kuta and Dasa kuta schools within the Madhva order. He commanded respect from King Krishnadeva Raya, who honoured him with the title kuladevata (family god). A poet of merit in Kannada and the author of seminal works in Sanskrit, Vyasatirtha was the guru responsible for shaping the careers of two of Kannada's greatest saint-poets, Purandara Dasa and Kanaka Dasa. Another prominent name in the age of Dasa (devotee) literature is Vadirajatirtha, a contemporary of Purandara Dasa and the author of many works in Kannada and Sanskrit.

Purandara Dasa (1484–1564), a wandering bard who visited Vijayanagara during the reign of King Achyuta Raya, is believed to have composed 475,000 songs in the Kannada and Sanskrit languages, although only about 1,000 songs are known today. Composed in various ragas, and often ending with a salutation to the Hindu deity Vittala, his compositions presented the essence of the Upanishads and the Puranas in simple yet expressive language. He also devised a system by which the common man could learn Carnatic music, and codified the musical composition forms svaravalis, alankaras and geethams. Owing to his contributions in music, Purandara Dasa earned the honorific Karnataka Sangeeta Pitamaha ('Father of Carnatic Music').

Kanaka Dasa (whose birth name was Thimmappa Nayaka, 1509–1609) of Kaginele (in modern Haveri district) was an ascetic and spiritual seeker, who according to historical accounts came from a family of Kuruba (shepherds) or beda (hunters). Under the patronage of the Vijayanagara king, he authored such important writings as Mohanatarangini ('River of Delight', 1550), written in dedication to King Krishnadevaraya, which narrates the story of Krishna in sangatya metre. His other famous writings are Narasimhastava, a work dealing with glory of God Narasimha, Nalacharita, the story of Nala, which is noted for its narration, and Hari Bhaktisara, a spontaneous writing on devotion in shatpadi metre. The latter writing, which is on niti (morals), bhakti (devotion) and vairagya (renunciation), continues to be a popular standard book of learning for children. A unique allegorical poem titled Ramadhanya Charitre ('Story of Rama's Chosen Grain') which exalts ragi over rice was authored by Kanaka Dasa. In this poem, a quarrel arises between ragi, the food grain of the poor, and rice, that of the rich, as to which is superior. Rama decides that ragi is superior because it does not rot when preserved. This is one of the earliest poetic expressions of class struggle in the Kannada language. In addition to these classics, about 240 songs written by Kanaka Dasa are available.

For a brief period following the decline of the Vijayanagara Empire, the devotional movement seemed to lose momentum, only to become active again in the 17th century, producing an estimated 300 poets in this genre; famous among them are Vijaya Dasa (1682–1755), Gopala Dasa (1721–1769), Jagannatha Dasa (1728–1809), Mahipathi Dasa (1750), Helavanakatte Giriamma and others. Over time, their devotional songs inspired a form of religious and didactic performing art of the Vaishnava people called the Harikatha ('Stories of Hari'). Similar developments were seen among the followers of the Veerashaiva faith, who popularised the Shivakatha ('Stories of Shiva').

=== Veerashaiva writings ===
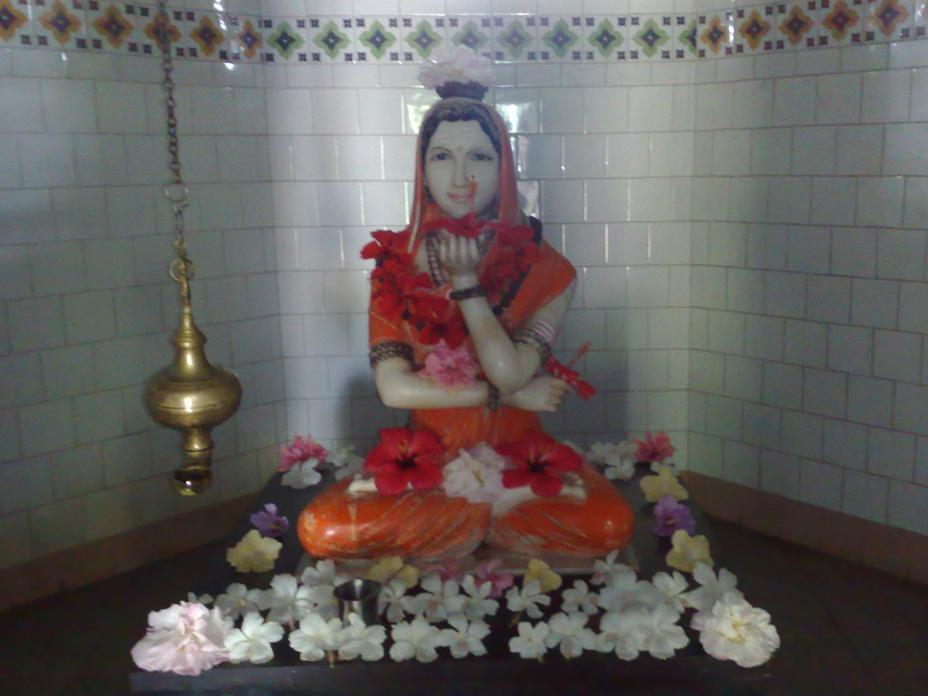
12th century Vachana poet Akka Mahadevi

Vachana poetry, developed in reaction to the rigid caste-based Hindu society, attained its peak in popularity among the under-privileged during the 12th century. The Veerashaivas, who wrote this poetry, had risen to influential positions by the Vijayanagara period. Following the Muslim invasions in the early 14th century, Brahmin scholars methodically consolidated writings of Hindu lore. This inspired several Veerashaiva anthologists of the 15th and 16th centuries to collect Shaiva writings and vachana poems, originally written on palm leaf manuscripts. Because of the cryptic nature of the poems, the anthologists added commentaries to them, thereby providing their hidden meaning and esoteric significance. An interesting aspect of this anthological work was the translation of the Shaiva canon into Sanskrit, bringing it into the sphere of the Sanskritic cultural order.

Well known among these anthologies are Ganabhasita Ratnamale by Kallumathada Prabhudeva (1430), Visesanubhava Satsthala by Channaviracharya (16th century) and Bedagina Vachanagalu by Siddha Basavaraja (1600). The unique Shunyasampadane (the 'mystical zero') was compiled in four versions. The first among them was anthologised by Shivaganaprasadi Mahadevaiah (1400), who set the pattern for the other three to follow. The poems in this anthology are essentially in the form of dialogues between patron saint Allama Prabhu and famous Sharanas (devotees), and was meant to rekindle the revolutionary spirit of the 12th century. Halage Arya (1500–1530), Gummalapura Siddhalinga Yati (1560) and Gulur Siddaveeranodaya (1570) produced the later versions.

Though the writing of vachana poems went into decline after the passing of the Basavanna era in the late 12th century, latter day vachanakaras such as Tontada Siddhesavara (or Siddhalinga Yati), a noted Shaiva saint and guru of King Virupaksha Raya II, started a revival. He wrote Shatsthala Jnanamrita (1540), a collection of 700 poems. In 1560, Virakta Tontadarya made the life of Tontada Siddhesavara the central theme in his writing Siddhesvara Purana. Virakta Tontadarya, Gummalapura Siddhalinga, Swatantra Siddhalingeshwara (1560) and Ghanalingideva (1560) are some well-known vachana poets who tried to recreate the glory days of the early poets, though the socio-political expediency did not exist.

Mystic literature had a resurgence towards the beginning of the 15th century, in an attempt to synthesise the Veerashaiva and advaitha (monistic) philosophies; this trend continued into the 19th century. Prominent among these mystics was Nijaguna Shivayogi, by tradition a petty chieftain near the Kollegal region (modern Mysore district) turned Shaiva saint, who composed devotional songs collectively known as Kaivalya sahitya (or Tattva Padagalu, literally "songs of the pathway to emancipation"). Shivayogi's songs were reflective, philosophical and concerned with yoga. They were written in almost all the native metres of Kannada language with the exception of shatpadi metre.

Shivayogi's other writings include a scientific encyclopedia called Vivekachintamani, so well regarded that it was translated into Marathi language in 1604 and Sanskrit language in 1652 and again in the 18th century. The writing categorises 1,500 topics based on subject and covers a wide array such as poetics, dance and drama, musicology and erotics. His translation of the Shiva Yoga Pradipika from Sanskrit was done to elucidate the Shaiva philosophy and benefit those ignorant of the original language.

In the post-Vijayanagara era, the Kaivalya tradition branched three ways. The first consisted of followers of the Nijaguna Shivayogi school, the second was more elitist and brahminical in nature and followed the writings of Mahalingaranga (1675), while the third was the branch that kept the vachana tradition alive. Well-known poet-saints from this vachana tradition were Shivayogi's contemporary Muppina Sadakshari, whose collection of songs are called the Subodhasara; Chidananda Avadhuta of the 17th century; and Sarpabhushana Shivayogi of the 18th century. So vast is this body of literature that much of it still needs to be studied.
