= Development of Carnatic music =

Musical history of Karnataka, India

Karnataka is a state of India with a long tradition of innovation in the fields of both Carnatic and Hindustani classical music.

Basaveshwara, King of Kalyana, leader of the Bhakti movement and Prime Minister of Bijjala, created his Vachanas, an integral part of the Indian classical music's development during this period, which also saw the rise of composers like Chandraja, Shantala, Akka Mahadevi and Allama. Later, Ventamakhin 's Chaturdandi Prakashika and Chaturkallinatha 's Sanghamitra further refined these traditions.

With the rise of Vaishnavism and the Haridasa movement came prominent composers from Karnataka like Purandaradasa, Kanakadasa, Vijaya Dasa and Jagannatha Dasa. The Wodeyars of Mysore were great patrons of the arts.

== Development ==
In earlier times, Sangeeta Shaastra followed the "Guru-Shishya" tradition, and there did not exist any written text. First classical music began as abhyasa, and it was only later that shaastras were formed. It is estimated that only during the period of Bharata Muni (300 BC) were the theories of sangeeta documented for the first time, and this was termed as "Natya Shastra". For a considerable period of time it was one of the only authoritative treatise (PramaaNa Grantha) for the whole of India. After that, independent growth of classical music occurred across different parts of India, in different forms.

Around 1200 CE, a scholar by name "Śārṅgadeva" wrote a treatise, which was named as "Sangita Ratnakara" - an Indian musical treatise that is considered to be the first documented work on South Indian classical music. He hailed from Devagiri, which was at the time a part of Karnataka (but is now Daulatabad, province of Hyderabad). Later, in 1350 CE, South Indian classical music obtained a well-defined structure through the works of Maadhava.

Carnatic music saw renewed growth during the Vijayanagar Empire by the Kannada Haridasa movement of Vyasaraja, Purandara Dasa, Kanakadasa and others. Among the Haridasa movement, Purandara Dasa who is known as the Sangeeta Pitamaha (the grandfather of Carnatic music), is credited with the founding of the system of teaching Carnatic music. Others of the Haridasa movement, helped shaped the music of their time and prepared for the future by influencing some of the composers who came after them. Thyagaraja acknowledges the influence of Purandaradasa. Tulajaji, the Maharashtra ruler of Tanjore (1729-35 A.D.), writes of the music of Haridasas in his book Sangita Saramrita, and venerates Vyasaraya and Purandaradasa as great composers.

Around 1650 AD, Govinda Deekshit, who was a minister in the court of King Achyuta Nayaka of Tanjavore, is believed to have written an introduction to "Sangeeta Sudha". Govinda Dikshita's son was the renowned Venkatamakhin, who is credited with the classification of ragas in the Melakarta System, and he wrote his most important work; Chaturdandi Prakasika (c.1635 CE) in Sanskrit. Kshetrajna who wrote "Shrungaara padas" (which also deals with theory of Sangeeta Shaastra) was also living at this time (1650).

The development of Carnatic music in Karnataka, from Sharngadeva to Venkatamakhin (a duration of 650 years), resulted in further expansion and establishment of Carnatic music.
