= Prasanna Venkata Dasa =

Hindu scholar and saint

Personal life
- Born: Venkanna; 1680 CE Bagalkot, Karnataka
- Died: 1752 CE Present day Karnataka, India
- Occupation: Saint, Poet, philosopher, composer

Religious life
- Religion: Hinduism

Prasanna Venkata Dasa (Kannada: ಪ್ರಸನ್ನ ವೆಂಕಟ ದಾಸ); (c.1680 – c.1752), was a revered saint, poet, and philosopher of the Haridasa movement in Karnataka during the 18th century. He belonged to the Dvaita Vedanta tradition founded by Madhvacharya, and through his devotional works, he became one of the most prominent figures in Haridasa movement.

== Biography ==
Prasanna Venkata Dasa was born in a pious Kannada-speaking Madhva Brahmin family as Venkanna in 1680 in Bagalkot. He was a contemporary of other prominent Haridasa saints such as Vijaya Dasa, Gopala Dasa, and Jagannatha Dasa, with whom he collectively shaped the devotional, cultural, and philosophical landscape of Karnataka. These saints emphasized the Bhakti, making spiritual knowledge accessible to common people through simple yet profound devotional songs in Kannada. Prasanna Venkata Dasa composed songs under the pen name (ankita) Prasanna Venkata Vithala, which is traditionally believed to have been given to him by Lord Venkateshwara in a dream at Tirumala. His writings include kīrtanas (hymns of praise), sulādis (structured musical compositions), ugābhogas (introductory free flowing songs), and padas (lyrical poems). These songs were designed to be easy to sing and remember, often accompanied by musical instruments, thereby reaching a wide audience including those without formal education. His compositions focus on the tenants of Tattvavada, the ideals of bhakti, vairagya, righteous living and spiritual truths of Dvaita Vedanta expressed in simple Kannada, making complex philosophy accessible to the masses. Beyond his spiritual and philosophical content, his works had a deep impact on the development of Carnatic music. Prasanna Venkata Dasa, enriched the bhakti music tradition with melodies and lyrical forms that continue to be sung in devotional and classical music settings. Together with his contemporaries, Prasanna Venkata Dasa played a crucial role in cementing the Haridasa literary and musical legacy, which remains a cornerstone of Kannada Vaishnava devotional literature. Among his selected works, his composition on the Ramayana is notable, in which Prasanna Venkata Dasa presented the essence of the epic in exactly eight stanzas.
