= Sri Raghavendrar =

1985 film by S. P. Muthuraman

- Theatrical release poster
- Directed by: S. P. Muthuraman
- Written by: A. L. Narayanan (dialogues)
- Starring: Rajinikanth; Lakshmi; Vishnuvardhan
- Cinematography: T. S. Vinayagam
- Edited by: R. Vittal; S. B. Mohan
- Music by: Ilaiyaraaja
- Production company: Kavithalayaa Productions
- Release date: 1 September 1985
- Running time: 160 minutes
- Country: India
- Language: Tamil

Sri Raghavendrar is a 1985 Indian Tamil-language Hindu historical film directed by S. P. Muthuraman and produced by Kavithalayaa Productions. The film is based on the life of Hindu saint Raghavendra Tirtha.

The film stars Rajinikanth, portraying the title character, in his 100th film. Lakshmi, Vishnuvardhan, Delhi Ganesh and Nizhalgal Ravi play prominent roles. The soundtrack was composed by Ilaiyaraaja and lyrics were written by Vaali. The dialogue for the film was written by A. L. Narayanan. The cinematography was handled by T. S. Vinayagam, while the editing was done by duo R. Vittal and S. B. Mohan.

The film was released on 1 September 1985 to positive reception, with Rajinikanth's performance as a saint receiving widespread praise, however, performance at the box office was lukewarm.

== Plot ==
This film features the life of Raghavendra Tirtha, from Birth till his Mahasamadhi.

== Cast ==
- Rajinikanth as Raghavendra Tirtha
- Lakshmi as Saraswathi Bai
- Vishnuvardhan as Sri Yogenthra Tirtha
- Sathyaraj as Maqbool Khan, Nawab of Adoni
- Mohan as Mukuntha
- Ambika as Aparajita
- Somayajulu as Sri Sudeendrar
- K. R. Vijaya as Devi Saraswathy
- Delhi Ganesh as Appanacharya (foremost disciple)
- Major Sundarrajan as King of Tanjavore
- Y. G. Mahendra as Guru Sri Sudeendrar's disciple
- Thengai Srinivasan as Priest
- Poornam Viswanathan as a Devotee whose son accidentally dies but revived by Sri Raghavendra
- V.S. Raghavan as Srinivasacharya Devotee
- Nizhalgal Ravi as Venkanna
- Senthamarai as Tamil Poet
- Janagaraj as Guru Sri Sudeendrar's disciple
- S. R. Veeraraghavan as Seemaachar
- Srikanth as Devotee who is blessed by Sri Raghavendra who protects this family by killing the demon character
- G. Srinivasan as Lower caste person mistreated by the Srinivasacharya devotee initially but blessed by Sri Raghavendra
- Manorama as Saraswathi Bai's friend
- Nisha Noor as Saraswathi Bai's friend
- Typist Gopu
- Vennira Aadai Moorthy
- Peeli Sivam
- C. Vasantha as the wife of the devotee whose son accidentally dies
- Pandari Bai

== Production ==
Sri Raghavendra was Rajinikanth's 100th film (including his other language films). The film featured him in the role of the saint Raghavendra Tirtha, different from the larger-than-life characters which he is known for and portrayed. Rajinikanth, a fan of Kannada actor Rajkumar, had seen his film Mantralaya Mahatme where Rajkumar portrayed Raghavendra. Rajinikanth approached S. P. Muthuraman to direct the film. Muthuraman was initially reluctant to direct a devotional film as he hails from a family of Self-Respect Movement, but Balachander encouraged and convinced him to take up the film. To prepare himself to direct the film, Muthuraman watched various devotional films directed by A. P. Nagarajan who was known for such films. In order to portray the scenes of saint authentically, few people from Raghavendra Mutt were invited to the shoot to provide their guidance. Prior to the start of the film, the team took the script first to the Swami's abode in Mantralayam, and got it blessed. They did the same thing with the first copy, post-completion. Muthuraman said that during the 90-day schedule, all the cast and crew of the film undergone the ritual of fasting on Thursday in reverence to lord's presence considering it was the mythological film. The introduction song with Sathyaraj was shot for the film; however Balachander felt this song was glamorous and felt out of place in a devotional film, hence Muthuraman removed the song from the film.

== Soundtrack ==
Soundtrack was composed by Ilaiyaraaja and lyrics for all songs were written by Vaali. The song "Parthale Theriyadha" is based on Anandabhairavi raga. The song "Aadal Kalaiye" is based on Charukesi raga. The song "Azhaikiran Madhavan" is based on Subhapantuvarali raga. The song "Ramanamam" is based on Mayamalavagowla raga. The song "Mazhaikkoru" is based on Amruthavarshini raga. The song "Unakum Enakum" was later reused by American Musical group Black Eyed Peas's bonus track "The Elephunk Theme" from their 2003 album Elephunk.

All lyrics are written by Vaali; all music is composed by Ilaiyaraaja.

Track listing
No.	Title	Singer(s)	Length
1.	"Aadal Kalaiye"	K. J. Yesudas
2.	"Azhaikiraan Maathavan"	K. J. Yesudas, Malaysia Vasudevan, C. Dinesh
3.	"Kathiravan Ezhunthaan"	Malaysia Vasudevan
4.	"Mazhaikku Oru Devaney"	K. J. Yesudas
5.	"Paarthale Theriyaatha"	Manorama, Vani Jairam
6.	"Raama Naamam"	K. J. Yesudas, Vani Jayaram, Madurai Srinivasan
7.	"Unakkum Enakkum"	S. Janaki, Malaysia Vasudevan

== Reception ==
The film received tax exemption from Tamil Nadu government, and received positive reviews, primarily for Rajinikanth's performance. Despite this Rajinikanth won three awards for his performance: the Film Fans Association Award for Best Actor, Cinema Express Award for Best Actor – Tamil and Filmalaya Award for Best Actor. The film itself frequently features on lists compiling Rajinikanth's best movies, and he considers it a personal favourite film. Jayamanmadhan of Kalki praised Rajinikanth for scoring a century and choosing a role which is one of the hundred for his 100th film something that will make proud.
