= Raghavendra Tirtha =

Hindu philosopher and theologian (c.1595–1671)

Raghavendra Swamy
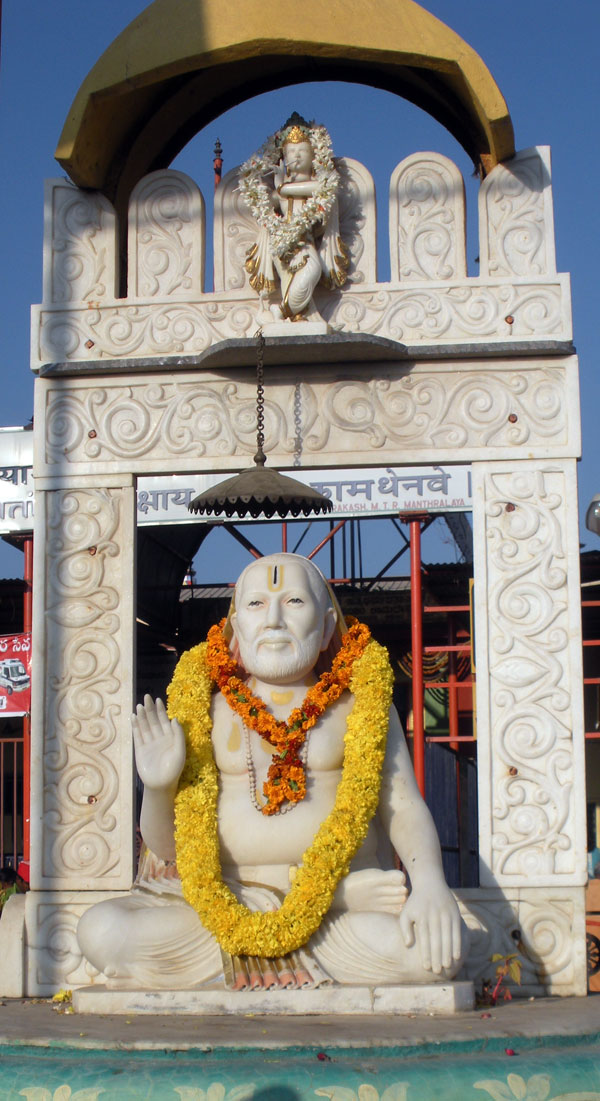

Personal life
- Born: Venkatanatha Bhatta; 1595 or 1598 Bhuvanagiri
- Children: Lakshminarayanacharya
- Notable work(s): Bhatta Sangraha, Nyaya Sudha Parimala, Tantradipika
- Honors: Parimalacharya

Religious life
- Religion: Hinduism
- Order: Madhwa Sampradaya
- Philosophy: Tattvavada
- Lineage: Raghavendra Swamy Matha
- Monastic name: Raghavendra Tirtha

Religious career
- Teacher: Sudheendra Tirtha
- Successor: Sri Yogendra Tirtha

Raghavendra Tirtha (Rāghavēndra Tīrtha), also referred as Raghavendra Swami, (c.1595 – c.1671) was a Vaishnava scholar, theologian, and saint. He was also known as Sudha Parimalacharya (Sudhā Parimaḷācārya). His diverse oeuvre include commentaries on the works of Madhva, Jayatirtha, and Vyasatirtha, interpretation of the Principal Upanishads from the standpoint of Dvaita and a treatise on Purva Mimamsa. He served as the pontiff of the matha at Kumbakonam from 1621 to 1671. Raghavendra Tirtha was also an accomplished player of the veena and he composed several songs under the name of Venu Gopala. His memorial at Mantralayam attracts lakhs (hundreds of thousands) of visitors every year.

== Biography ==
Raghavendra Tirtha was born as Venkatanatha in the town of Bhuvanagiri, present day in Tamil Nadu into a Kannada Madhva Brahmin family of Gautama Gotra of musicians and scholars. His great-grandfather Krishna Bhatta was a tutor to the Vijayanagara emperor Krishnadevaraya. His grandfather was Kanakachala Bhatta, and his father Thimmanna Bhatta (also known as Thimmannacharya) was an accomplished scholar and musician. After the fall of the Vijayanagara Empire, Thimmanacharya migrated to Kanchi with his wife Gopikamba. Venkatanatha had two siblings—Gururaja and Venkatamba. Venkatanatha's education was taken care of by his brother-in-law Lakshmi Narasimhacharya at Madurai after the early demise of his father, and he subsequently got married.

In 1624, Raghavendra Tirtha became the pontiff of the Kumbhakonam Matha, which was earlier known as Vijayeendra Matha or Dakshinadi Matha, now known by the name of Mantralaya Sri Raghavendra Swamy Matha. Uttaradi Math along with Vyasaraja Math and Raghavendra Math are considered to be the three premier apostolic institutions of Dvaita Vedanta and are jointly referred as Mathatraya.

After a short stay at Kumbakonam, he went on a pilgrimage to Rameswaram, Ramnad, Srirangam, and Mathura. Later, he moved westwards to Udupi and Subramanya, and then to Pandharpur, Kolhapur and Bijapur. At Kolhapur, he is said to have stayed for a long time and at Bijapur, he supposedly defeated many Advaitins and converted them to Dvaita fold. After that, he returned to Kumbakonam. By 1663 he left for Mysore where he got a grant from Dodda Devaraya Odeyar. Finally, he chose to settle down in Mantralayam.

According to tradition, he attained Vrindavana in 1671 in Mantralayam, a village on the bank of river Tungabhadra in Adoni taluk in Andhra Pradesh.

== Works ==
About 45 works written in Sanskrit are attributed to Raghavendra Tirtha. Sharma notes that his works are characterised by their compactness, simplicity and their ability to explain the abstruse metaphysical concepts of Dvaita in understandable terms.

His Tantradipika is an interpretation of the Brahma Sutra from the standpoint of Dvaita, incorporating elements from Jayatirtha's Nyaya Sudha, Vyasatirtha's Tatparya Chandrika and the glosses by Vijayendra Tirtha. Bhavadipa is a commentary on Jayatirtha's Tattva Prakasika which, apart from elucidating the concepts of the source text, criticises the allegations against Madhva raised by Appaya Dikshita and grammarian Bhattoji Dikshita. Raghavendra Tirtha's expertise in Purva Mimamsa and Vyakarana is evident from his works on Vyasatirtha's Tatparya Chandrika, which runs up to 18,000 stanzas, and his lucid commentary on the Purva Mimamsa Sutras called Bhatta Sangraha, explaining the Purva Paksha and Siddhanta. His most celebrated work is his commentary on Nyaya Sudha titled Nyaya Sudha Parimala, earning him the title Sudha Parimalacharya (Sudhā Parimaḷācārya). Apart from these works, he wrote commentaries on the Upanishads, first three chapters of Rigveda (called Mantramanjari) and Bhagavad Gita.

Sruti Prasthana
| Work | Description |
|---|---|
| Mantrarthamanjari | A commentary based on Madhvacharya's interpretation of first three chapters from the Rig Veda consisting of 40 suktas. |
| Aitreya Upanishad Mantartha Samgraha | A commentary on the mantra portion of the text. |
| Isha Upanishad Khandartha | A commentary based on Madhvacharya's Upanishad Bhashya and associated Upanishad sub-commentaries. |
| Brihadaranyaka Upanishad Khandartha | A commentary based on Madhvacharya's Upanishad Bhashya and associated Upanishad sub-commentaries. |
| Katha Upanishad Khandartha | A commentary based on Madhvacharya's Upanishad Bhashya and associated Upanishad sub-commentaries. |
| Taittiriya Upanishad Khandhartha | A commentary based on Madhvacharya's Upanishad Bhashya and associated Upanishad sub-commentaries. |
| Talavakara Upanishad Khandhartha | A commentary based on Madhvacharya's Upanishad Bhashya and associated Upanishad sub-commentaries. |
| Chandogya Upanishad Khandhartha | A commentary based on Madhvacharya's Upanishad Bhashya and associated Upanishad sub-commentaries. |
| Satprashna Upanishad Khandhartha | A commentary based on Madhvacharya's Upanishad Bhashya and associated Upanishad sub-commentaries. |
| Manduka Upanishad Khandhartha | A commentary based on Madhvacharya's Upanishad Bhashya and associated Upanishad sub-commentaries. |
| Mandukya Upanishad Khandhartha | A commentary based on Madhvacharya's Upanishad Bhashya and associated Upanishad sub-commentaries. |

Sutra Prasthana
| Work | Description |
|---|---|
| Tantra Dipika | An independent commentary on Brahma Sutras based on Siddhanta in 3000 Granthas. |
| Bhatta Sangraha | An independent commentary on Purva Mimamsa Sutras from a Tattvavada perspective. |
| Tattva Manjari | A commentary on Anu Bhasya of Madhvacharya in 1900 Granthas. |
| Tattva Prakashika Bhavadvipa | A commentary on Jayatirtha's Tattva Prakashika on Brahma Sutra Bhasya in 12,300 Granthas. |
| Nyaya Sudha Parimala | A lucid commentary of 19,300 Granthas on Jayatirtha's magnum opus Nyaya Sudha on Anuvyakhyana earning him great fame. |

== The Legend of Raghavendra Tirtha and Sir Thomas Munro ==
A legend about Raghavendra Tirtha and Sir Thomas Munro was recorded by W. Francis, an Indian civil servant to British India, in 1916, more than 100 years after it happened. The legend as follows: After Sir Thomas Munro was appointed as principal collector for the district of Bellary in 1800, he went to collect the taxes on Mantralaya (Mantsala). It was said that Raghavendra Tirtha appeared from the tomb and spoke with Thomas Munroe while the saint was invisible and inaudible to others. Munroe was convinced and went back to his camp and instructed to keep the endowment of Mantralaya Mutt. Direct documentations of this incident are missing.

== In popular culture ==
Raghavendra Tirtha has been eulogised by Narayanacharya in his contemporaneous biography Raghavendra Vijaya and a hymn Raghavendra Stotra by Appannacharya. Outside the confines of Dvaita, he is regarded as a saint known for preaching the worship of Vishnu regardless of caste or creed.

Hebbar notes "By virtue of his spiritual charisma, coupled with the innumerable miracles associated with him, the pontiff saint may very well be said to possess an independent and cosmopolitan cult of his own with his devotees hailing not only from all walks of life but from all castes, sects and even creeds as well". His humanitarianism is evident in the devotional poems composed in his honour by Vijaya Dasa, Gopala Dasa and Jagannatha Dasa.

Raghavendra has also seen representation in the popular culture through Indian Cinema:

| Year | Film | Title role | Director | Language | Notes |
|---|---|---|---|---|---|
| 1966 | Mantralaya Mahatme | Dr. Rajkumar | T. V. Singh Thakur | Kannada | The song from the film titled "Indu Enage Govinda" was written by Raghavendra himself |
| 1980 | Sri Raghavendra Vaibhava | Srinath | Babu Krishnamurthy | Kannada | Srinath won Karnataka State Film Award for Best Actor for the film |
| 1981 | Mantralaya Sri Raghavendra Vaibhavam | Rama Krishna | M. R. Nag | Telugu | Ramakrishna's last film as a Hero in Telugu |
| 1985 | Sri Raghavendrar | Rajnikanth | SP. Muthuraman | Tamil | The film was Rajnikanth's 100th |
