= Mantralaya =

Mantralaya may refer to:

- Mantralayam, Andhra Pradesh, India, a major center of pilgrimage for Hindus belonging to the Madhva sect
  - Mantralayam Assembly constituency
- Mantralaya, Mumbai, administrative headquarters of Maharashtra in South Mumbai, built in 1955

== See also ==
- Mantralaya Mahatme, a 1966 Indian film
