= Jagannatha Dasa =

Jagannatha Dasa may refer to:

- Jagannatha Dasa (Odia poet), saint poet, author of the Odia Bhagabata and founder of the Atibadi Sampradaya of Utkaliya Vaishnavism, 15th century, Odisha
- Jagannatha Dasa (Kannada poet), 18th-century Sanskrit scholar from Karnataka
