= Cheekalaparvi =

Cheekalaparvi Chikalparvi
- Village
- Location within Karnataka Location within India
- Coordinates: 15°53′48.74″N 77°3′24″E
- Country: India
- State: Karnataka
- District: Raichur district
- Taluk: Manvi

Population (2001)
  - Total: 2,577

Languages
  - Official: Kannada
- Time zone: UTC+5:30 (IST)
- PIN: 584 123
- Telephone code: 08538
- Vehicle registration: KA-36

Cheekalaparvi, also spelled Chikalparvi is a village in the Manvi taluk of Raichur district, in the Indian state of Karnataka. The village is located on the banks of the Tungabhadra river, to the south of Manvi.

Cheekalaparvi is the birthplace of Vijaya Dasaru.

== Demographics ==
As of the 2001 India census, Cheekalaparvi had a total population of 2,577; 1,270 being male and 1,307 female, making up 478 households.

== See also ==
- Mantralayam
- Manvi
- Raichur
