= Haridasa =

Hindu tradition

The Haridasa Bhakti Sahitya devotional movement (sampradaya) originated in Karnataka, India, after Madhvacharya, and spread to eastern states such as Bengal and Assam of medieval India. Over a span of nearly six centuries, several saints and mystics helped shape the culture, philosophy and art of South India in general and Karnataka in particular by exerting considerable spiritual influence over the masses and kingdoms that ruled South India.

This movement was ushered in by the Haridasas (lit "servants of Lord Hari") and took shape in the 13th century – 14th century CE period, prior to and during the early rule of the Vijayanagara Empire. The main objective of this movement was to propagate the Dvaita philosophy of Madhvacharya (Madhva Siddhanta) to the masses through a literary medium known as Dasa Sahitya (lit "literature of the dāsas").

Prominent Hindu philosophers, poets and scholars such as Sripadaraya, Vyasathirtha, Vadirajatirtha, Purandara Dasa and Kanaka Dasa played an important role during this time. Though the movement found its roots in the Kannada country and later spread to other parts of South India, it was a net result of earlier devotional movements such as the Veerashaiva movement (of Vachana literature in Kannada) of northern Karnataka led by Basavanna (12th century) and the Alvar saints of Tamil Nadu (10th century). Later, Vallabhacharya in Gujarat and Guru Chaitanya were influenced by the teachings of Madhvacharya. Chaitanya's devotees started the International Society for Krishna Consciousness - known colloquially as the Hare Krishna Movement.

The Haridasas were saints, some of whom were wandering bards, and considered themselves as slaves of their supreme lord - Hari. While the movement was mainly heralded by the Brahmins, it was a devotional one whose ideals and thoughts pervaded and received noteworthy contributions from all sections of society. The Haridasa movement can be considered as a part of a larger Bhakti movement whose devotional inspiration to the masses lasted over a millennium. The Haridasa movement made significant contribution to Kannada devotional literature.

== Origin ==
The origin of the Haridasa movement is not clearly known, with some legends indicating there were holy men and kings who espoused this form of devotion as early as the 9th century. The Haridasas' songs attribute Sripadaraya as the movement's true founder in the 15th century, despite the Srikurmam inscription suggesting that Narahari Tirtha, the direct disciple of Madhvacharya may have been its originator. However it is well known that the great Vaishnava religious devotionalism called Dasa Kuta found its organizational base and started to produce large congregation of devotees in the Karnataka region, largely due to the Vedanta (philosophy) propounded in the 13th century by Madhvacharya of Udupi (1238 - 1317 CE).

The Haridasas' who propagated the philosophy of Madhvacharya belonged to two groups; the Dasakuta, those who conveyed the philosophy of Madhvacharya in simple and lucid Kannada to the masses, and the Vyasakuta, those who were required to be proficient in the Vedas, Upanishads and other Darshana (scriptures). During this period, this movement became a strong spiritual force which helped a resurgence of a strong Hindu sentiment in Southern India, when Northern India was already under Muslim rule. The Haridasas' found state patronage in the Vijayanagara Empire which at its peak, ruled over the entire Southern India. Vyasatirtha was intimately associated with the empire and was considered the family guru by King Krishnadevaraya.

Haridasas' belonged to the Vaishnava tradition of Hinduism and worshipped Vitthala, a manifestation of the Hindu god Vishnu and all forms of Krishna (an avatar of Vishnu).

== Preachers ==
The Haridasas' generally hailed from places in present-day Karnataka, but there were some exceptions such as Jayatirtha who was a native of Mangalvedhe near Pandharapur in modern Maharashtra and Naraharitirtha who was a native of either Andhra Pradesh or Orissa. Naraharitirtha (1281), a minister in the court of Kalinga was inducted into the Madhvacharya order. He composed many early devotional hymns in praise of Vishnu in the Kannada language, some of which are available today. While the Srikurmam inscription indicates that Naraharitirtha may have been the originator of this devotional movement, the songs of the Haridasas' give credit to Sripadaraya as the real founder of the movement in the 15th century.

Famous Saints & Haridasas from the Madhvacharya order during the Vijayanagar empire period were:

- Naraharitirtha (1243 - 1333 CE)
- Akshobhyatirtha ( 1282- 1365 CE)
- Jayatirtha (1345 – 1388 CE)
- Sripadaraya (1404 - 1502 CE.)
- Vyasatirtha (1447 - 1539 CE.)
- Vadirajatirtha (1480 - 1600 CE.; lived for 120 years)
- Vijayindratirtha (1514-1595 CE)
- Raghuttamatirtha (1537 - 1596 CE)
- Raghavendratirtha (1595 - 1671 CE)
- Purandara Dasa (1480 - 1564 CE.)
- Kanaka Dasa (1508 - 1606 CE.)

== Growth and patronage ==
Sripadaraya, Vyasatirtha and Vadirajatirtha are called "three great saints" (yathi raja trayaru, as they were accorded royal patronage) in the Haridasa movement whereas the epithet "great trinity of Vaishnava composers" from Karnataka goes to Sripadaraya, Purandaradasa and Kanakadasa, though it is difficult to separate literature, music, devotion from their composite writings. The center of their activity in the 15th–16th century was Hampi, the royal centre of Vijayanagara, the regal capital of Vijayanagara empire.

The Haridasa movement gained further impetus in the 17th and 18th centuries in and around Raichur District. Some of the noted saints from this era were Guru Raghavendra, Vijaya Dasa, Gopala Dasa, Jagannatha Dasa, Prasanna Venkata Dasa, Pranesha Dasa, Venugopala Dasa also known as Panganama Timmanna Dasa, Mahipathi Dasa, Mohanna Dasa, Helevanakatte Giriamma and Harapanhalli Bhimavva. The history of the Haridasa movement from the 13th century to the present day is the history of spreading Hari bhakti (devotion to Hari or Vishnu) to the common man and in that purpose contributed immensely to Kannada literature and to the development of Kannada language. Both the Haridasa and Veerashaiva movements pervade the length and breadth of Karnataka and exert ennobling influences upon the neighboring provinces of Andhra Pradesh, Tamil Nadu and Maharashtra.

== Contribution to Kannada literature ==
Haridasa movement made a significant contribution towards Kannada literature by spawning a whole corpus of devotional literature in the form of verses, hymns and musical compositions, popularizing the Dvaita philosophy postulated by Saint Madhvacharya. The literature that originated from this devotional movement is called Dasa Sahitya (or dasara padagalu - literature of the dasas). These various compositions are generally called as Devaranamas (literally meaning names of the Lord) and are sung in the praise of the god Vishnu. These compositions have the concept of Hari Bhakti (devotion to God) at their core and they usually revolve around references to Hindu mythology and the Dvaita philosophy. Some Haridasas' such as Purandara Dasa and Kanaka Dasa also composed several Devaranamas using day-to-day episodes, morals and virtues as the central theme. These compositions were in simple Kannada language since the main objective of this movement was to take the devotional movement to the common man. In doing so, the common people were also educated in the importance of consciousness (jnana), devotion (bhakti), ethics and Hindu religion. Their hymns (padas) set to various musical tones (ragas) aroused fervor among the masses. As advocates of religious reform, the Haridasas' propounded the virtues of detachment (vairagya). Similes and metaphors found in their songs and hymns were used to great effect in achieving this. In addition to devotional songs, Kanaka Dasa authored five literary classical writings in the kavya style. Jagannathadasa, Vijaya Dasa and Gopaladasa etc., are more well known among a galaxy of composers who made rich contributions to Kannada literature.

The compositions can be broadly classified under one of the following three types:

- Kavya or poetic compositions
- Tatva or philosophic compositions
- General compositions.

=== Pen name (Ankita Nama) ===
Each Haridasa had a unique ankita nama, or pen-name, with which they 'signed' all their compositions. The pen names of some of the most well known Haridasas is listed below:

Haridasa	Period	Ankita nama (Insignia)	Notes
Naraharitirtha	1243-1333	Narahari Raghupathi	
Sripadaraya	1404-1502	Ranga Vitthala	
Vyasatirtha	1460-1539	Sri Krishna	
Vadirajatirtha	1480-1600	Hayavadana	
Raghavendratirtha	1595-1671	Dheera Venugopala	
Purandara Dasa	1484-1564	Purandara Vittala	
Kanaka Dasa	1508-1606	Kaginele Adikeshava	
Vijaya Dasa	1682-1755	Vijaya Vittala	
Gopala Dasa	1722-1762	Gopala Vittala	
Panganama Timmanna Dasa	1722-1765	Venugopala Vittala	
Helevanakatte Giriyamma	18th Century	Helevanakatte Ranga	
Jagannatha Dasa	1727-1809	Jagannatha Vittala	
Mahipathidasa	1611-1681	Mahipathi	
Prasanna Venkatadasa	1680-1752	Prasanna Venkata	
Mohanadasa	1728-1751	Mohana Vittala	
Nekkara Krishnadasa	18th Century	Varaha Thimmappa	
Jayesha Vittala Dasa	1850-1932	Jayesha Vittala	

== Contribution to Carnatic music ==
Purandara Dasa, one of the foremost of Haridasas' is known as the "Father of carnatic music" (Karnataka Sangeeta Pitamaha) for his invaluable contributions to this art form. He was a prolific composer. Historians propose the number of his compositions in the Kannada language were as many as 75,000 - 475,000, though only few hundreds are available today. He composed several Kirtane which later served as the foundation for the Kriti form, elaborated and perfected by the Trinity of Carnatic music. He codified and consolidated the teaching of Carnatic music by evolving several graded steps such as sarali, jantai, thattu varisai, alankara and geetham, and laid down a framework for imparting formal training in the art form. The structure and lessons he formulated four centuries ago remain the foundation for all students of Carnatic music. Apart from Purandara Dasa, several later Haridasas' composed songs adhering to the same musical and philosophical traditions. Their compositions usually fell in one of the following categories: Padagalu (or Devaranama- devotional hymns), Kriti, Ugabhoga, Suladi, Vruttanama, Dandaka, Tripadi (three line poetry), Pattadi, Sangathya and Ragale (lyrical verses in blank verse). These forms of composition are still prevalent in South India and especially in Karnataka.

Though these compositions usually adhere to the carnatic style of music, some of these compositions have also been sung in the Hindustani style by musicians such as Bhimsen Joshi and Gangubai Hangal.

== See also ==
- Carnatic music
- Dvaita
- Vijayanagara Empire
