= Gopala Dasa =

Indian philosopher (1721–1769)

Gopala Dasa (1721–1769) was a prominent 18th-century Kannada language poet and saint belonging to the Haridasa tradition. With other contemporary Haridasas such as Vijaya Dasa and Jagannatha Dasa, Gopala Dasa propagated the Dvaita philosophy of Madhvacharya in South India through Kirtans ("Songs of God") known as Dasara Padagalu with the pen-name (ankita nama or mudra) "Gopala Vittala".He is Ganesa Amsha.

Gopala Dasa was named "Bhaganna" at birth. He was born in a Madhva Brahmin family in Mosarakallu a village in Raichur district of Karnataka state, India. After his initiation into the Madhwa order as Dasa, he became a disciple of Vijaya Dasa and is credited to being a prolific composer. He is known to have been an astrologer as well. Later Gopala Dasa inspired the well known woman saint Helavanakatte Giriyamma to compose melodious songs in praise of the Hindu god Vishnu.

Legend has it that once Vijaya Dasa, a leading Haridasa of the 18th century, invited Jagannatha Dasa to attend a religious ceremony and dine with his devotees. Jagannatha Dasa, who was known for his scholarship in Sanskrit, thought it unnecessary to mingle with the Kannada Haridasas and pretended to have severe stomach pain. Another account claims Jagannatha Dasa even excused himself by feigning sickness due to Tuberculosis. Soon Jaganatha Dasa actually began to suffer from acute stomach pain. Unable to find a suitable remedy, he went to Vijaya Dasa who advised him to approach Gopala Dasa. Jagannatha Dasa's problem was solved by Gopala Dasa. Realizing his mistake and wrong attitude toward the Haridasas, Jaganatha Dasa joined the Madhwa order and went on to become one of its foremost proponents.

== Bibliography ==
- Various (1988) [1988]. Encyclopaedia of Indian literature – vol 2. Sahitya Akademi. ISBN 81-260-1194-7.
- Shiva Prakash, H.S. (1997). "Kannada". In Ayyappapanicker (ed.). Medieval Indian Literature:An Anthology. Sahitya Akademi. ISBN 81-260-0365-0.
