= Mantralaya Mahatme =

- DVD cover
- Directed by: T. V. Singh Thakur
- Written by: Rajaguru Rajacharya
- Based on: Sri Raghavendra Vijaya by Rajaguru Rajacharya
- Produced by: T. V. Singh Thakur
- Starring: Rajkumar
- Cinematography: B. Dorairaj
- Edited by: N. C. Rajan
- Music by: Rajan–Nagendra
- Distributed by: Jagajyothi Films
- Release date: 1966
- Running time: 161 minutes
- Country: India
- Language: Kannada

Mantralaya Mahatme is a 1966 Indian Kannada-language film directed by T. V. Singh Thakur, based on the book Sri Raghavendra Vijaya written by Rajaguru Rajacharya. The film stars Rajkumar in the role of Raghavendra Swami, a Hindu saint who lived in the 17th-century India. Udaykumar, Jayanthi and Kalpana appear in pivotal roles. Dorai–Bhagavan were extensively involved in the production and direction department of this film. The film is being colorised in wide-screen and set to release in 2022.

== Cast ==
- Rajkumar as Raghavendra Swami

Rajkumar as Raghavendra Swami

- Jayanthi as Saraswathi
- Kalpana as Tulasi
- Udaykumar as Thimmanna Bhat
- H. R. Shastry as sudheendra tirtha
- A. V. Seshagiri Rao
- Advani Lakshmi Devi
- M. Jayashree
- B. Jaya

== Production ==
In an interview, S. K. Bhagawan says that for the film Rajkumar was on a 43-day strict vegetarian diet and he also walked 18000 m without wearing a chappal.

== Soundtrack ==
The music of the film was composed by the duo Rajan–Nagendra with lyrics for the soundtrack written by G. V. Iyer. The song "Indu Enage Govinda" was taken from Raghavendra Swami's works.

Track listing
No.	Title	Lyrics	Singer(s)	Length
1.	"Thungaatheera Viraajam"	Sri Rajaguru Rajacharyaru	P. B. Sreenivas
2.	"Kavyarathi Mandirada Prathibanvitha"	G. V. Iyer	P. Leela, Veeramani
3.	"Abharanada Alankaravenu Illade"	G. V. Iyer	S. Janaki, L. R. Eswari
4.	"Kaliyirondu Paatavannu Kannada Thaay Makkale"	G. V. Iyer	P. B. Sreenivas
5.	"Neenu Baaralilla Ninna Neleya Helalilla"	G. V. Iyer	P. B. Sreenivas
6.	"Rasika Saalade Rasada Authana"	G. V. Iyer	S. Janaki
7.	"Indu Enage Govinda"	Raghavendra Swami	P. B. Srinivas
