= Purandara Dasa =

Music composer (1470 – 1564)

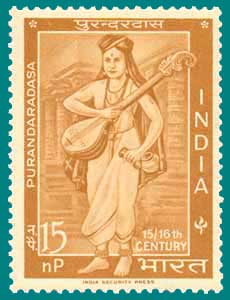
- Purandara Dasa on a 1964 stamp of India

Personal life
- Born: Srinivasa Nayaka; 1470 Purandaragada (near present-day Pune, Maharashtra, India) or Shimoga district (present-day Karnataka, India)
- Died: 2 January 1564 (aged 93–94) Vijayanagara, Vijayanagara Empire (Modern Day Hampi, Karnataka, India)
- Spouse: Saraswati Bai
- Occupation: Carnatic Vocalist, scholar, Saint, poet, composer

Religious life
- Religion: Hinduism
- Philosophy: Dvaita, Vaishnavism

Religious career
- Teacher: Vyasatirtha

Purandara Dasa (IAST: Purandara Dāsa; (c.1470 – c.1564) was a composer, singer and a Haridasa philosopher from present-day Karnataka, India. He was a follower of Madhvacharya's Dvaita philosophy, and one of the chief founding proponents that shaped modern Carnatic music. In honor of his contributions to Carnatic music, he is referred to as the Pitamaha (lit. "grandsire") of Carnatic music. According to a legend, he is considered as an incarnation of Narada.

Purandara Dasa was a wealthy merchant of gold, silver and other miscellaneous jewellery from Karnataka, who gave away all his material riches to become a Haridasa (literally meaning a servant of Vishnu or Krishna), a devotional singer who made the difficult Sanskrit tenets of Bhagavata Purana available to everyone in simple and melodious songs. He was one of the most important music scholars of medieval India. He formulated the basic lessons of teaching Carnatic music by structuring graded exercises known as Svaravalis and Alankaras

== Biography ==
Inscriptional evidence suggests Purandara Dasa was born to a diamond merchant in a Kannada Deshastha Madhva Brahmin family in 1470, in Purandara gada,18 km far from pune present-day Maharashtra state. According to others opinion, his native town was Purandaraghatta in Karnataka, or Purandaragad near Pune, but the latter is considered a historical mistake – connecting his "pen name" (his ankita) with a location that mainly served as a military encampment in the 15th and 16th century. In 2018, a five-member committee set up by the Government of Karnataka to ascertain the birthplace of Purandara Dasa has submitted its report asserting Tirthahalli as the likeliest candidate. The committee included veteran singer and musicologist RK Padmanabha, scholars Aralumallige Parthasarathi, AV Navada, Veeranna Rajora, and former minister Leeladevi Navada. It is now ascertained that Purandharadasa was born in Araga, Vijayanagara Empire (Modern Day Thirthahalli, Shivamogga District, Karnataka, India), Karnataka

== Dating ==
Dasa's died in 1564 according to his son Madhvapati. But his year of birth is unknown. Several dates have been proposed. B. N. K. Sharma said Dasa was born in 1484 and in later reprints changed this to 1494. But many scholars, authors and historians have different opinions on this. Authors Guy L. Beck of University of South Carolina and William Joseph Jackson of Oxford University gave dates as 1480-1564 CE. Prominent scholar Amaresh Datta, the chief editor of the Encyclopaedia of Indian Literature published by Sahitya Akademi in this book he gave Purandara Dasa dates as 1480–1564. But based on the historical event of Purandara Dasa meeting Annamacharya and the keerthanas (spiritual songs) that they have sung together on Sri Venkateshwara Swamy at Tirumala, which were recorded by Annamacharya's grandson Tallapaka Chinanna, Tirumala Tirupati Devasthanams gave year of birth of Purandara as 1470.

=== Dates based on his meeting Annamacharya ===
Most of the authors or scholars have not taken the historical event of Purandara Dasa meeting Annamacharya and both singing sankeerthanas (devotional songs) on Sri Venkateshwara Swamy at Tirumala into consideration while decided the dates. Based on the manuscripts found, which were written by Tallapaka Chinanna, the grandson of Annamacharya Tirumala Tirupati Devasthanams gave its analysis. Based on these manuscripts, Purandara Dasa met Annamacharya after taking Haridasa initiation from Vyasatirtha in Hampi when he was 30 years old and Annamacharya was in his 90's. After meeting both Purandara Dasa and Annamacharya sang songs in front of Sri Venkateshwara Swamy in Tirumala temple. Based on these historical recorded events the scholars of Tirumala Tirupati Devasthanams did analysis and finally declared that Purandara Dasa met Annamacharya in the year 1500 and the year of birth of Purandara Dasa as 1470.

== Father of Carnatic music ==
Dasa systematized the method of teaching Carnatic music which is followed to the present day. He introduced the raga Mayamalavagowla as the basic scale for music instruction and fashioned a series of graded lessons such as swaravalis, janti swaras, alankaras, lakshana geetas, prabandhas, ugabhogas, daatu varase, geeta, sooladis and kritis. Another contribution was the fusion of bhava, raga, and laya in his compositions. He included comments on ordinary daily life and elements of colloquial language in his lyrics. He introduced folk ragas into the mainstream, setting his lyrics to ragas of his day so that even a common man could learn and sing them. He also composed several lakshya and lakshana geetas, many of which are sung to this day. His sooladis are regarded as musical masterpieces and are the standard for raga lakshana. Scholars attribute the standardization of varna mettus entirely to Purandara Dasa.

Dasa was a vaggeyakara (composer-performer), a lakshanakara (musicologist), and the founder of musical pedagogy. Musicologists call him the Sangeeta Pitamaha (lit. 'grandfather') of Karnataka (Carnatic) music.

== Social reforms ==
Purandara Dasa tried to reform existing social practices and preached through devotional songs in the local Kannada language. Most of his keertanas deal with social reform and pinpoint the defects in society.

=== Casteism ===
Purandara Dasa fought the evils of casteism through his songs. In his song aavakulavaadarenu aavanadarenu aatma bhavavariyada mele he wonders what is the use if one does not understand the spirit of humanism whatever caste or status one might be accredited to. In the same song when relating to cows of different colours and sugarcane of different shapes he emphasizes that one's birth cannot merely decide the highness or lowness of any individual.

== Memorials ==
The Purandara Mantapa adjoins the Vijayavittala temple at Hampi

Dasa is said to have composed his song, ‘Aadisidaleshoda jagadoddharana’ on infant Sri Krishna at the Aprameyaswamy temple in Doddamallur, where a small mantapa outside the temple is named after him.

A statue of Dasa has been erected at the foothills of Tirumala in Alipiri. cert hall, called 'Purandara Mantapa', has been erected on the premises of the Trust.

- On 14 January 1964 India issued a stamp in honour of Dasa on the 400th anniversary of his death.

== Movies ==
Three biographical films, in the Kannada language, have been made on the life and compositions of Purandara Dasa.

- Purandaradasa (1937)
- Navakoti Narayana (1964)
- Sri Purandara Dasaru (1967)
- Film director and playwright Girish Karnad made a documentary film titled Kanaka-Purandara (English, 1988) on the two medieval Bhakti poets of Karnataka.

== Collections of his lyrics ==
- Gaja Vadana Beduve Gowri Thanaya A popular Purandara Dasa composition in Carnatic Raagam Hamsadhwani
- Songs of Three Great South Indian Saints, Oxford University Press, 2002, ISBN 9780195646559

== See also ==
- List of Carnatic composers
- Trinity of Carnatic music

== Cited sources ==
- Sharma, B.N.K. (2000). History of the Dvaita School of Vedanta and Its Literature. Delhi: Motilal Banarsidass. ISBN 978-81-208-1575-9.
- Shistla, Rajeshwara Shastry (2015). Purandara Dasu. Anil Kumar Singhal, I.A.S., Executive Officer, Tirumala Tirupati Devasthanams, Tirupati and Printed at T.T.D Press, Tirupati.
