= Vijaya Dasa =

Hindu scholar and saint (1682-1755)

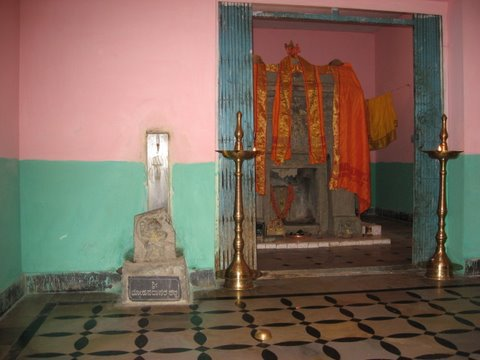
- Temple in honor of Vijaya Dasa

Personal life
- Born: Dasappa; 1682 CE Cheekalaparvi (Present day Manvi taluk, Raichur district, Karnataka)
- Died: 1755 CE Present day Karnataka, India
- Occupation: Saint, Poet, philosopher, composer

Religious life
- Religion: Hinduism

Vijaya Dasa (Kannada: ವಿಜಯದಾಸ) (c. 1682– c. 1755) was a prominent saint from the Haridasa tradition of Karnataka, India in the 18th century, and a scholar of the Dvaita philosophical tradition. Along with contemporary haridasa saints such as Gopala Dasa, Helevankatte Giriamma, Jagannatha Dasa and Prasanna Venkata Dasa, he propagated the virtues of the philosophy of Madhwacharya across South India through devotional songs called devaranama written in the Kannada language. An integral part of Kannada Vaishnava devotional literature, these compositions in praise of the Hindu god Vishnu as well as other deities are called dasara padagalu (compositions of the dasas). He has influenced both Carnatic music and Hindustani music through his compositions. His ankita (pen name) is Vijaya vithala. These compositions can be more specifically categorized as keertanas, suladis, ugabhogas, and simply padas. They were easy to sing to the accompaniment of a musical instrument and dealt with bhakti (devotion) and the virtues of a pious life.

== Early years ==
Vijaya Dasa was born as Dasappa in a poor Kannada Deshastha Madhva Brahmin family of Bharadwaja Gotra in Cheekalaparvi in Manvi taluk of Raichur district, Karnataka state. His parents were Srinivasappa and Kusamma. He left home at a young age due to poverty. Later he came back with some saints from north India to Cheekalaparvi and somehow tried to manage his family but failed to overcome poverty. He went back to Varanasi where he became a scholar. One night, he had a dream in which the 16th century Carnatic composer and wandering saint Purandara Dasa initiated him into the Haridasa tradition and gave him the ankita nama (pen name) Vijaya Vittala and a Tamboori (Tanpur, musical instrument). From that day he was called Vijaya Dasa (dasa lit, the one who serves God), and dedicated his life to spreading Dvaita teachings. Amongst Sri Vijaya Dasa's host of disciples, three were outstanding that have earned the adage "Bakthiyalli Bhaganna, Yukthiyalli Mohanna matthu Sakthiyalli Timmanna". Bhaganna lived on to become Shri Gopala Dasa, Mohanna was Shri Vijaya Dasa's foster son who became the renowned Shri Mohanna Dasa and Diwan Panganam Timmanna lived on to become Shri Venugopala Vittala Dasa.

== Compositions and ministry ==
His 25,000 extant compositions earned him the title Dasa Shrestha (noble among the dasas). His compositions which use many Sanskrit words come under the category of Kalasha and Urasu creations and are considered an important component of Kannada literature (Kannada Sahitya). His purported miracles include calming the Ganges, entering it without getting wet, preventing a woman from committing suicide, resurrecting his son, and making an uneducated man speak difficult Sanskrit proficiently. He is among the group credited with starting the practice of singing devotional songs while walking up the Tirumala hills in modern Andhra Pradesh. These hills are the location of the Tirumala Venkateswara Temple, an important pilgrim locations for Vaishnava Hindus.
