= Mantralayam =

- Village
- Location in Andhra Pradesh, India Mantralayam (India)
- Coordinates: 15°56′30″N 77°25′41″E
- Country: India
- State: Andhra Pradesh
- District: Kurnool

Population (2015)
  - Total: 14,452

Languages
  - Official: Telugu
- Time zone: UTC+5:30 (IST)
- PIN: 518345
- Telephone code: 08512
- Vehicle registration: AP 21

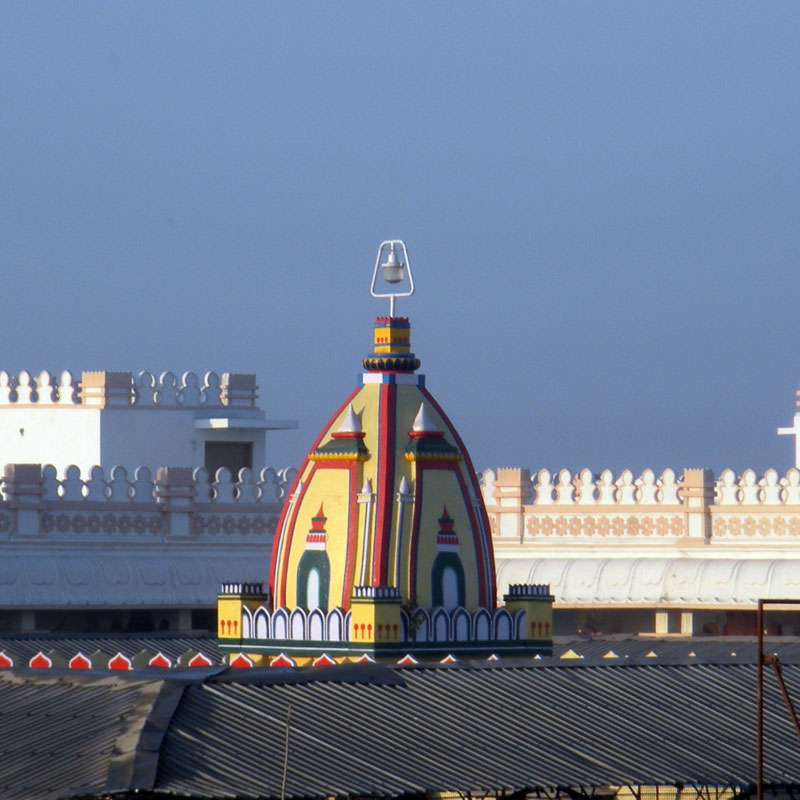
Mantralayam temple

Mantralayam is a pilgrim village and Mandal in the Kurnool district of Andhra Pradesh, on the banks of the Tungabhadra River.

== Demographics ==
Mantrayalam Taluk has a population of 61,294 people with roughly 92% Hindus, 7% Muslims and 0.5% Christians and 0.2% people following other faith.Telugu is the official language and spoken as mother tongue overwhelmingly.

Religion in Mantralayam Taluk 2011
Religion	Percent
Hinduism	92.21%
Islam	7.04%
Christianity	0.55%
Other or not stated	0.19%

Languages of Mantralayam Taluk 2011
1. Telugu (89.0%)
2. Urdu (6.25%)
3. Kannada (2.27%)
4. Lambadi (1.73%)
5. Others (0.73%)
