= Jagannatha Dasa (Kannada poet) =

Indian saint-poet

Jagannatha Dasa (Kannada: ಜಗನ್ನಾಥ ದಾಸ) (1728–1809), a native of Manvi town in the Raichur district, Karnataka state, India, comes in the preceptorial line of Madhvacharya and is considered one of the notable Haridasa mystics of Dvaita Vedanta of Madhva ( Madhva philosophy, or Dvaita Vedanta, teaches that God (Vishnu), individual souls (jīvas), and the material world are eternally distinct realities. Individual souls are dependent on God but are never identical with Him. The philosophy holds that the world is real rather than an illusion and that all forms of life, including plants and animals, possess intrinsic value within God's creation. Followers of Dvaita Siddhanta are not merely devotees of Vishnu; they also accept the philosophical doctrines established by Madhvacharya, including the eternal distinction between God, souls, and matter. .) saint-poets of the Kannada language. He was a pupil of the Varadendra Tirtha (a pontiff of Raghavendra Math (Mantralayam)).

Apart from authoring numerous well-known devotional songs that propagate the Vaishnava bhakti ("faith") of Dvaita Vedanta of Madhvacharya, Jagannatha Dasa wrote the Harikathamritasara in the native shatpadi (six-line verse) metre and Tattva suvali in the native tripadi (three-line verse) metre.

== Overview ==
For about a century after the departure of Vadirajatirtha (1480–1600), a noted saint-poet, the Haridasa devotional cult which propagated the Dvaita philosophy of Madhvacharya through lucid Kannada devotional songs, seemed to wane. The movement revived in the 18th century under the guidance of Vijaya Dasa, this time centered on the town of Mantralayam in modern Andhra Pradesh and a large area covering the Raichur district in modern Karnataka. The poetry written by these later day saints closely followed the style established by the 15th- and 16th-century saints of the Haridasa cadre. The Haridasa contribution to Hindu mysticism and the Bhakti literature overall is similar to the contributions of the Alvars and Nayanmars of modern Tamil Nadu and that of the devotional saint-poets of Maharashtra and Gujarat. According to the scholar H.S. Shiva Prakash, about 300 saint-poets from this cadre enriched Kannada literature during the 18th and 19th centuries.

== Legend ==
Legend has it that Jagannatha Dasa, born in a Madhva Brahmin family whose birth name was Srinivasacharya (or Sinappa), studied chatushastras under Sri varadendra teertha and became an accomplished scholar in the Sanskrit language. He was once invited by Vijaya Dasa, a noted Haridasa of the 18th century, to attend a religious ceremony at Manvi. The ceremony included dining with the devotees of Vijaya Dasa as well. Srinivasacharya, considering himself a renowned Sanskrit scholar, had developed an arrogance towards religious leaders who spread the glory of the Lord in Kannada, which was noted by Srinivasacharya as a layman's language. He thus refused the invitation coldly, adding that if he had lunch later with the devotees and dasas, he would develop a stomach ache. Gopala Dasa heard of this behaviour and felt insulted by Srinivasacharya's reaction to their humble invitation and angrily cursed Srinivasacharya, wishing for his words to come true. Srinivasacharya fell ill and developed severe stomach pains. Unable to find relief, Srinivasacharya sought the help of Vijaya Dasa who asked him to meet his disciple Gopala Dasa. Srinivasacharya visited Gopala Dasa and was cured by him. Repentant for his attitude towards the Haridasas, Srinivasacharya became a disciple of Gopala Dasa and took to the Haridasa fold. His poems are written with the ankita (pen name, also called mudrika) "Jagannatha Vittala". These details are known from a song written by Jagananatha Dasa expressing his gratitude to Gopala Dasa and Vijaya Dasa.

== Kannada literature ==
The Harikathamritasara is a poem that treats on the philosophy of Madhvacharya and is considered his magnum opus and an important work by the Dvaita school. Written in the native Bhamini Shatpadi metre, it contains 32 chapters (sandhis) comprising 988 stanzas. Later day scholars wrote ten commentaries on this work, including a Sanskrit commentary in 1862 (by Sankarsana Odeyaru), an indication of its superior literary content. The Tattva Suvali, containing 1,200 pithy and proverbial poems of which 600 stanzas are available today, was written in the native tripadi metre, in a simple style, and is known to have been a consolation to his young widowed daughter-in-law gopamma, wife of his son damodara dasa.
