= Karma in Hinduism =

Translations of Karma
- English: Action, work, deed
- Sanskrit: कर्म (IAST: karma)
- Assamese: কৰ্ম (karmô)
- Balinese: ᬓᬃᬫ (karma)
- Bengali: কর্ম (kôrmô)
- Hindi: कर्म (karm)
- Javanese: ꦏꦂꦩ (karma)
- Kannada: ಕರ್ಮ (karma)
- Kashmiri: کَرَم (karam)
- Marathi: कर्म (karma)
- Nepali: कर्म (karma)
- Odia: କର୍ମ (Kawrmaw)
- Punjabi: ਕਰਮ (karam)
- Tamil: கர்மா (karmā)
- Telugu: కర్మ (karma)

Karma is a concept in Hinduism which describes a system in which advantageous effects are derived from past beneficial actions and harmful effects from past harmful actions, creating a system of actions and reactions throughout a soul's (jivatman's) reincarnated lives, forming a cycle of rebirth. The causality is said to apply not only to the material world but also to our thoughts, words, actions, and actions that others do under our instructions. Karma is not considered as the only factor that determines one's fate.

According to Vedanta thought, the most influential school of Hindu theology, the effects of karma are controlled by God (Isvara).

There are four different types of karma: prarabdha, sanchita, and kriyamana, and agami. Prarabdha karma is experienced through the present body and is only a part of sanchita karma, which is the sum of one's past karmas. Kriyamana karma is the karma that is being performed in the present, whereas Agami karma is the result of current decisions and actions.

== Origins ==
The earliest appearance of the word "karma" is found in the Rigveda. The term also appears in the Atharvaveda, where it is associated with ritual action. According to the Brahmanas, "a man is born to the world he has made" and after death, one is placed in a balance in the other world for an estimate of one's good and evil deeds. The Brahmanas also state that as a man is 'constituted' by his desires, he is born in the other world according to those desires.

The earliest evidence of the term’s expansion into an ethical domain is provided in the Upanishads. In the Brhadaranyaka, one of the earliest of the Upanishads, Yajnavalkya expressed: “A man turns into something good by good action and into something bad by bad action.” The doctrine occurs here in the context of a discussion of the fate of the individual after death.

According to Chowdhury, the belief in rebirth is evident in the Brāhmaṇas, where words like punar-mrtyu (re-death), punar-asu (coming to life again) and punarajati (rebirth) are used to denote it. Chowdhury notes that some scholars interpret punar-mrtyu verses as repeated death in the afterlife rather than transmigration; however, he suggests that rebirth may also be implied in Rigveda 10.14.8c, with reference to the deceased being asked to "come home once again".

Wendy Doniger O'Flaherty discusses karma and rebirth in the Puranas, including religious practices believed to overcome or reverse karmic consequences.

== Definitions ==
Everything that we have ever thought, spoken, done or caused is karma, as is also that which we think, speak or do this very moment. Hindu scriptures divide karma into three kinds:

- Sanchita is accumulated karma from endless lifetimes, as clarified by Swami Mukundananda
- Prarabdha is a collection of past Sanchita karmas that are selected to be experienced through the present body and is "fixed karma," that cannot be changed nor altered.
- Kriyamana is everything that we produce in our current life. All kriyamana karmas flow into Sanchita karma and consequently shape our future. Only in human life, we can change our future destiny. After death, we lose Kriya Shakti (ability to act) and Kriyamana (do) karma until we are born again in another human body.

Some believe that only human beings who can distinguish right from wrong can do (Kriyamana) karma. Therefore, animals and young children are considered incapable of creating new karma (and thus cannot affect their future destinies) as they are incapable of discriminating between right and wrong.

Tulsidas, a Hindu saint, said: "Our destiny was shaped long before the body came into being." As long as the stock of Sanchita Karma lasts, a part of it continues to be taken out as Prarabdha Karma for being enjoyed in one lifetime, leading to the cycle of birth and death. A Jiva cannot attain moksha (liberation) from the cycle of birth and death, until the accumulated Sanchita karmas are completely exhausted.

Unkindness yields spoiled fruits, called pāpa, and good deeds bring forth sweet fruits, called punya. As one acts, so does one become: one becomes virtuous by virtuous action, and evil by evil action.

== The role of Isvara (God) ==
Several different views exist in Hinduism, some extant today and some historical, regarding the role of divine beings in controlling the effects of karma or the lack thereof.

=== Markandeya Purana ===
According to the Markandeya Purana, Shani (Saturn) is described as the son of the Sun god, Surya, and his wife Chhaya (shadow). Saturn is characterized as cold and dry due to its internal core structure made of ice. Internally, he is considered pure. The Purana also states that Shani was entrusted with the role of the Lord of Karma and Justice by the Trimurti.

=== In Vedanta ===
In Vedanta philosophy, the creator Ishvara rules over the world through the law of karma. The various schools of Vedanta hold that karma cannot function independently on its own. Instead they think that God (Isvara) is the dispenser of the fruit (phala) of karma. This idea is defended in the Brahmasutras, a major scriptural source for Vedanta.

The Brahmasutras (3.2.38) state:

The fruits of action (phalam) come from Him (The Lord, Isvara), since this is reasonable (upapatteḥ).

==== In the Advaita system of Śaṅkara ====
In the non-dualistic (Advaita) school of Vedanta, the creator God (Ishvara) is not the ultimate reality, instead the formless Brahman is the supreme truth. As such, the teaching of karma is part of Maya, or the relative and ultimately illusory reality. Nevertheless, Advaita also shares the general concepts of karma and rebirth with other Indian religions, with some differences.

In a commentary to Brahma Sutras (III, 2, 38, and 41), a Vedantic text, Adi Sankara, an Indian philosopher who consolidated the doctrine of Advaita Vedanta, a sub-school of Vedanta, argues that the original karmic actions themselves cannot bring about the proper results at some future time; neither can supersensuous, non-intelligent qualities like adrsta—an unseen force being the metaphysical link between work and its result—by themselves mediate the appropriate, justly deserved pleasure and pain. The fruits, according to him, then, must be administered through the action of a conscious agent, namely, a supreme being (Ishvara).

Shankara (8th century) comments as follows:

Karma is insentient and short-lived, and cannot therefore be expected to bestow the fruits of actions at a future time according to one’s deserts. We do not see any insentient thing bestow fruits on those who worship it. Therefore it is only from the Lord, who is worshipped through actions, that their results proceed.

A human's karmic acts result in merits and demerits. Since unconscious things generally do not move except when caused by an agent (for example, the axe moves only when swung by an agent), and since the law of karma is an unintelligent and unconscious law, Sankara argues there must be a conscious God who knows the merits and demerits which persons have earned by their actions, and who functions as an instrumental cause [a "judge and police-force" working for "the law"] in helping individuals reap their appropriate fruits.

Thus, God affects the person's environment, even to its atoms, and for those souls who reincarnate, produces the appropriate rebirth body, all in order that the person might have the karmically appropriate experiences.

==== In the Vishishtadvaita of Rāmāṉuja ====
Ramanuja of the Vishishtadvaita school, another sub-school of Vedanta, addresses the problem of evil by attributing all evil things in life to the accumulation of evil karma of jivas (souls in bondage to a corporeal form) and maintains that God is "amala," or without any stain of evil. In his Sri Bhasya, Ramanuja's interpretation of the Brahma sutras from a Vaishnavite theistic view, Brahman, whom he conceives as Vishnu, arranges the diversity of creation in accordance with the different karma of individual souls.

Ramanuja reiterates that inequality and diversity in the world are due to the fruits of karma of different souls and the omnipresent energy of the soul suffers pain or pleasure due to its karma. Ramanuja believed that creation is an eternally recurring cyclic process; hence, God is free from the responsibility of starting it and causing the evils accruing from it. Instead he believed that karma, the result of the actions of Jivas (souls) in previous embodiments, causes the good and evil, enjoyments and sufferings of karma which have to be necessary to be enjoyed or suffered by the Jivas themselves who are responsible for the fruits.

Although souls alone have the freedom and responsibility for their acts and thus reap the fruits of karma, i.e., good and evil karma, God as Vishnu, is the supreme Enforcer of karma, by acting as the Sanctioner (Anumanta) and the Overseer (Upadrasta). According to Ramanuja, all jivas are burdened with their load of Karma, which gives them only enjoyments and sufferings, but also desires and tendencies to act in particular ways; although the moral responsibility accrues only to the Jiva, as he acts according to the tendencies and deserts he has acquired by his karma, Ramanuja believes that God wills only their fructification. According to the foregoing concept, God is "compared to light which may be used for forging or for reading scriptures," but the merits or demerit "devolves entirely on the persons concerned and not on the darkness."

Furthermore, Ramanuja believes that Vishnu wishing to do a favor to those who are resolved on acting so as fully to please Her, engenders in their minds a tendency towards highly virtuous actions, such as means to attain to Him; while on the other hand, in order to punish those who are resolved on lines of action altogether displeasing to Him, He engenders in their minds a delight in such actions as have a downward tendency and are obstacles in the way of the attainment of God.

==== Madhva (Dvaita) ====
Madhva, the founder of the Dvaita school, another sub-school of Vedanta, on the other hand, believes that there must be a root cause for variations in karma even if karma is accepted as having no beginning and being the cause of the problem of evil. Since jivas have different kinds of karma, from good to bad, all must not have started with the same type of karma from the beginning of time. Thus, Madhva concludes that the jivas (souls) are not God's creation as in the Christian doctrine, but are rather entities co-existent with Vishnu, although under His absolute control. Souls are thus dependent on Him in their pristine nature and in all transformations that they may undergo.

According to Madhva, God, although He has control, does not interfere with Man's free will; although He is omnipotent, that does not mean that He engages in extraordinary feats. Rather, God enforces a rule of law and, in accordance with the just deserts of jivas, gives them the freedom to follow their own nature. Thus, God functions as the sanctioner or as the divine accountant, and accordingly Jivas are free to work according to their innate nature and their accumulated karma, good and bad. Since God acts as the sanctioner, the ultimate power for everything comes from God and the Jiva only utilizes that power, according to his/her innate nature. However, like Shankara's interpretation of the Brahma Sutras as mentioned earlier, Madhva, agrees that the rewards and punishments bestowed by God are regulated by Him in accordance with the good and sinful deeds performed by them, and He does so of out of His own will to keep himself firm in justice and he cannot be controlled in His actions by karma of human beings nor can He be accused of partiality or cruelty to anyone.

Swami Tapasyananda further explains the Madhva view by illustrating the doctrine with this analogy: the power in a factory comes from the powerhouse (God), but the various cogs (Jivas) move in a direction in which they are set. Thus he concludes that no charge of partiality and cruelty can be brought against God. The Jiva is the actor and also the enjoyer of the fruits of his/her own actions.

Madhva differed significantly from traditional Hindu beliefs, owing to his concept of eternal damnation. For example, he divides souls into three classes: one class of souls which qualify for liberation (Mukti-yogyas), another subject to eternal rebirth or eternal transmigration (Nitya-samsarins), and a third class that is eventually condemned to eternal hell or Andhatamas (Tamo-yogyas).

==== According to Sivananda ====
Swami Sivananda, an Advaita scholar, reiterates the Advaita view in his commentary synthesizing Vedanta views on the Brahma Sutras. In his commentary on Chapter 3 of the Brahma Sutras, Sivananda notes that karma is insentient and short-lived, and ceases to exist as soon as a deed is executed. Hence, karma cannot bestow the fruits of actions at a future date according to one's merit. Furthermore, one cannot argue that karma generates apurva or punya, which gives fruit. Since apurva is non-sentient, it cannot act unless moved by an intelligent being such as God. It cannot independently bestow reward or punishment.

There is a passage from Swami Sivananda's translation of the Svetasvatara Upanishad (4:6) illustrating this concept:

Two birds that are ever associated and have similar names, cling to the same tree. Of these two, one eats the fruit of divergent tastes, and the other looks on without eating.

In his commentary, the first bird represents the individual soul, while the second represents Brahman or God. The soul is essentially a reflection of Brahman. The tree represents the body. The soul identifies itself with the body, reaps the fruits of its actions, and undergoes rebirth. The Lord alone stands as an eternal witness, ever contented, and does not eat, for he is the director of both the eater and the eaten.

Swami Sivananda also notes that God is free from charges of partiality and cruelty which are brought against him because of social inequality, fate, and universal suffering in the world. According to the Brahma Sutras, individual souls are responsible for their own fate; God is merely the dispenser and witness with reference to the merit and demerit of souls.

In his commentary on Chapter 2 of the Brahma Sutras, Sivananda further notes that the position of God with respect to karma can be explained through the analogy of rain. Although rain can be said to bring about the growth of rice, barley and other plants, the differences in various species is due to the diverse potentialities lying hidden in the respective seeds. Thus, Sivananda explains that differences between classes of beings are due to different merits belonging to individual souls. He concludes that God metes rewards and punishments only in consideration of the specific actions of beings.

=== In Shaivism ===
==== Thirugnana Sambandar ====
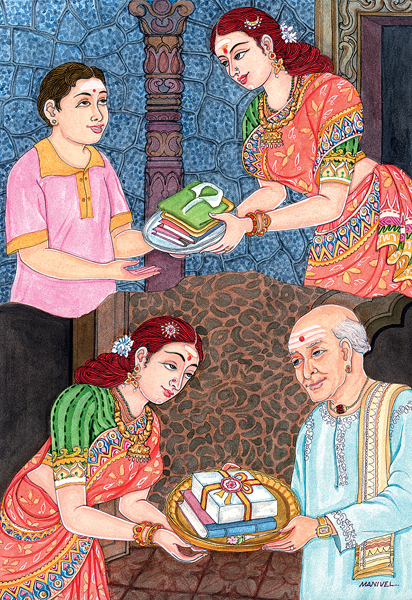
Karma as action philosophy and value theory: if we sow goodness, we will reap goodness.

Sambandar of the Shaiva Siddhanta school (7th century C.E.) discusses karma in his hymns on devotion and grace of Shiva. He explains the concept of karma in Hinduism by distinguishing it from that of Buddhism and Jainism, which do not require the existence of an external being like God. Sambandar explains the concept with a metaphor: just as a calf among a large number of cows can find its mother at suckling time, so also does karma find the specific individual it needs to attach to and come to fruition. However, theistic Hindus posit that karma, unlike the calf, is an unintelligent entity. Hence, karma cannot locate the appropriate person by itself. Sambantha concludes that an intelligent Supreme Being with perfect wisdom and power (Shiva, for example) is necessary to make karma attach to the appropriate individual. In such sense, God is the Divine Accountant.

==== Appayya Dikshita ====
Appayya Dikshita, a Shaiva theologian and proponent of Shiva Advaita, states that Shiva only awards happiness and misery in accordance with the law of karma. Thus persons themselves perform good or evil actions according to their own inclinations as acquired in past creations, and in accordance with those deeds, a new creation is made for the fulfilment of the law of karma. Shaivas believe that there are cycles of creations in which souls gravitate to specific bodies in accordance with karma, which as an unintelligent object depends on the will of Shiva alone.

==== Srikantha ====
Srikantha, another Saivite theologian and proponent of Shiva Advaita, believes that individual souls themselves do things which may be regarded as the cause of their particular actions, or desisting from particular actions, in accordance with the nature of the fruition of their past deeds. Srikantha further believes that Shiva only helps a person when he wishes to act in a particular way or to desist from a particular action. Regarding the view that karma produce their own effects directly, Srikantha holds that karma being without any intelligence cannot be expected to produce manifold effects through various births and various bodies; rather fruits of one's karma can be performed only by the will of God operating in consonance with man's free will, or as determined in later stages by man's own karma so the prints of all karma are distributed in the proper order by the grace of God Shiva. In this way, God is ultimately responsible on the one hand for our actions, and on the other for enjoyment and suffering in accordance with our karmas, without any prejudice to humans' moral responsibility as expressed through free will or as determined later by our own deeds.

=== Vaishnavism ===
==== Sacred texts ====
===== Bhagavata Purana =====
In Chapter 1 of 10th book of the Bhagavata Purana, Vasudeva, the father of Krishna, exhorts Kamsa to refrain from killing his wife, Devaki, the mother of Krishna, by stating that death is certain for those who are born and when the body returns to the five elements, the soul leaves the body and helplessly obtains another form in accordance with the laws of karma, citing passages from Brihadaranyaka Upanishad, IV:4:3. Moreover, he adds and states that the soul materializes into an appropriate body whatever the state of the mind one remembers at the time of death; i.e., at the time of the death, the soul and its subtle body of mind, intelligence and ego, is projected into the womb of a creature, human or non-human that can provide a gross body that is most suitable for the dominant state of the mind of the particular person at the time of death; note that this passage is similar in meaning as Bhagavad Gita, VIII, verse 6.

===== Vishnu Sahasranama =====
Many names in the Vishnu Sahasranama, the thousand names of Vishnu allude to the power of God in controlling karma. For example, the 135th name of Vishnu, Dharmadhyaksha, in the Advaita philosopher Sankara's interpretation means, "One who directly sees the merits (Dharma) and demerits (Adharma), of beings by bestowing their due rewards on them."

Other names of Vishnu alluding to this nature of God are Bhavanah, the 32nd name, Vidhata, the 44th name, Apramattah, the 325th name, Sthanadah, the 387th name and Srivibhavanah, the 609th name. Bhavanah, according to Sankara's interpretation, means "One who generates the fruits of Karmas of all Jivas (souls) for them to enjoy." The Brahma Sutra (3.2.28) "Phalmatah upapatteh" speaks of the Lord's function as the bestower of the fruits of all actions of the jivas.

==== Other Vaishnavite thoughts ====
Kulashekhara Alwar, a Vaishnava devotee, says in his "Mukundamala Stotra": 'yad yad bhavyam bhavatu bhagavan purva-karma-anurupam'. And purva-karma or bhaagya or daiva is unseen adrsta by us, and is known only to God as Vidhaataa. God created the law of karma, and God will not violate it. God does, however, give courage and strength if asked.

== In texts ==
=== Vedas ===
In Vedantic literature, there is an analogy. The bowman has already sent an arrow and it has left his hands. He cannot recall it. He is about to shoot another arrow. The bundle of arrows in the quiver on his back is the sanchita; the arrow he has shot is prarabdha; and the arrow which he is about to shoot from his bow is agami. Of these, he has perfect control over the sanchita and the agami/Kriyamana, but he must surely work out his prarabdha. The past which has begun to take effect he has to experience.

There is another analogy also. The granary represents the sanchita karma; that portion taken from the granary and put in the shop for future daily sale corresponds to agami; that which is sold daily represents prarabdha.

=== Dharmaśāstras ===
In Hinduism, more particularly the Dharmaśāstras, Karma is a principle in which "cause and effect are as inseparably linked in the moral sphere as assumed in the physical sphere by science. A good action has its reward and a bad action leads to retribution. If the bad actions do not yield their consequences in this life, the soul begins another existence and in the new environment undergoes suffering for its past deeds". Thus it is important to understand that karma does not go away; one must either reap the benefits or suffer the consequences of his past actions. The Brihadaranyaka Upanishad states, "According as a man acts and according as he believes so will he be; a man of meritorious acts will be meritorious, a man of evil deeds sinful. He becomes pure by pure deeds and evil by evil deeds. And here they say that person consists of desires. And as is his desire so is his will; and as is his will, so is his deed; and whatever deeds he does that he will reap". The doctrine of karma dates from ancient times and besides the above author is mentioned in the Gautama dharma-sutra, Shatapatha Brahmana, Kathaaka-grey-sutra, Chandogya Upanishad, Markandeya Purana, and many others.

The shastras written about karma go into some detail about possible consequences of karma. There is often talk about coming back as a variety of different objects when it comes to reincarnation and pasts lives. In this case, it holds true, or at least insofar as the texts state. The Kathaaka-grhya-sutra states, "some human beings enter the womb in order to have an embodied existence; others go into inorganic matter (the stump of a tree and the like) according to their deeds and according to their knowledge".

More extensively discussed is the consequences of karma in relation to sin. "Karmavipaka means the ripening (or fruition) of evil actions or sins. This fruition takes three forms, as stated in the Yogasutra II. 3, i.e., jati (birth as a worm or animal), ayuh (life i.e. living for a short period such as five or ten years) and bhoga (experiencing the torments of Hell".

=== Bhagavad Gita ===
In the Bhagavad Gita, Krishna differentiates between karma motivated by desire and karma yoga (selfless action performed as duty). Krishna teaches Arjuna that one must act according to dharma (righteous duty) without attachment to the results. While karma (including Vedic rituals) is usually performed for personal gain, karma yoga is action carried out with detachment, guided by wisdom (buddhi). In Chapter 2, verses 47-53, Krishna teaches that one has a right only to action, not its fruits, and instructs Arjuna to remain steadfast in yoga, treating success and failure with equanimity.

== Free will limited by karma ==
The doctrine of karma explains that while prarabdha karma shapes current life, we still have the free will to make choices in the present. These choices create agami karma (karma that affects our future). The present situation is influenced by the personal choices made through past actions, and the free will to make choices in the present shapes our future.

According to Swami Mukundananda's interpretation of Bhagavad Gita, Chapter 18, verse 63:

"[t]his free will to choose between available alternatives has been given to the soul by God. The freedom of choice is not infinite. One cannot decide, “I choose to be the most intelligent person in the world.” Our choices are limited by our past and present karmas. However, we do possess a certain amount of free will, for we are not machines in the hands of God. Sometimes people question that if God had not given us free will then we would not have done any evil. But then we would not have done anything good either. The opportunity to do good always comes with the danger of doing evil. More importantly, God wants us to love him, and love is only possible when there is a choice. A machine cannot love for it does not have any freedom of choice. God created us with free will and provided us with choices so that we may choose him and thereby exercise our love for him. Even the all-powerful God cannot force the soul to love and surrender to him; this decision has to be made by the soul itself. Here, Shree Krishna is calling Arjun’s attention to his free will and asking him to choose."

Karma is not the only factor for fate, and therefore, the Hindu concept of fate is not deterministic or fatalistic. Along with an individual's actions, gods, personalized time, death, or nature can influence fate.

== Mitigation of bad karma ==
According to a theistic view, the effects of one's bad karma may be mitigated. Examples of how bad karma can be mitigated include the following virtue, or living virtuously; performing good deeds, such as helping others; yoga, or worshiping God to receive grace; and conducting pilgrimages to sacred places, such as or to get the grace of God. In another example, Ganesha can unweave his devotees from their karma, simplifying and purifying their lives, but this only happens after they have established a personal relationship with Him.

=== Upanishads ===
Shvetashvatara Upanishad 7 and 12 aver that the doer of the deeds wanders about and obtains rebirth according to his deeds but postulates an omnipotent creator, i.e., Isvara and the doctrine of grace. Isvara is the great refuge of all and a person attains immortality when blessed by Isvara or at Isvara's pleasure.

A person can be free from sorrow through the grace of Isvara. Therefore, the Shvetashvatara Upanishad postulates a supreme Being whose grace to devotees provides a way of escape from the law of karma. As Adi Sankara stated in his commentary on Shvetashvatara Upanishad VI:4, "If we dedicate all our works to Ishvara, we will not be subject to the law of karma."

== Relation between birth in a particular body to karma ==
Theistic schools believe in cycles of creations where souls gravitate to specific bodies in accordance with karma, which as an unintelligent object depends on the will of God alone. For example, Kaushitaki Upanishad 1.2 asserts that birth in different forms of existence as a worm, insect, fish, bird, lion, boar, snake or a human, is determined by a person's deeds and knowledge.

Chandogya Upanishad 5.10.7 distinguishes between a good birth such as a birth in a spiritual family (i.e. brahmin caste), or an evil birth, such as birth as a dog or hog. Thus, the doctrine of karma comes to explain why different life forms manifest, into widely various levels of biological development such as characterization into different species from plants to various types of animals, and even differences between members of the same species, such as humans.

Swami Nikilananda comments: As the rivers, following their different courses, ultimately merge in the ocean and give up their names and forms, so the devotees, losing their names and forms, become one with the Supreme Reality.

== Relation between astrology and karma ==
According to Charles Keyes and Valentine Daniel, many Hindus believe that heavenly bodies, including the planets, have an influence throughout the life of a human being, and these planetary influences are the "fruit of karma." The Navagraha and planetary deities, including Shani (Saturn), are considered subordinate to Ishvara (i.e., the Supreme Being) and are believed by many to assist in the administration of justice. Such planetary influences are believed by many to be measurable using astrological methods including Jyotiṣa, the Hindu system of astrology.

== Karma and Samadhi ==
In his commentary on Yoga Sutra I.50, Vijnanabhiksu shares the view of the relationship between karma and samadhi in Samkhya and Vedanta. According to Vijnanabhiksu, the samskaras (impressions) associated with wisdom only eliminate the sanchita (dormant and unmanifest) karma, not the prarabdha karma, which has already been activated. Samadhi is said to eliminate all dormant karma. However, the karma already active in the yogi's present life, such as their lifespan, body type, and ongoing experiences, continues until the yogi reaches nirbija samadhi.

== Other uses in Hinduism ==
Other uses include such expressions such as "ugra-karma", meaning bitter, unwholesome labor.

== See also ==
- Fate
- Just-world fallacy
- Karma in Buddhism
- Hindu answers to the problem of evil
  - Problem of evil
- Reincarnation and Hinduism
- Wyrd

== Sources ==
- Chowdhury, Tarapada (1957). history of western and eastern philosophy by radha krishnan. Translated by Radhakrishnan Sarvepalli.
