= Raghuttama Tirtha =

Hindu guru

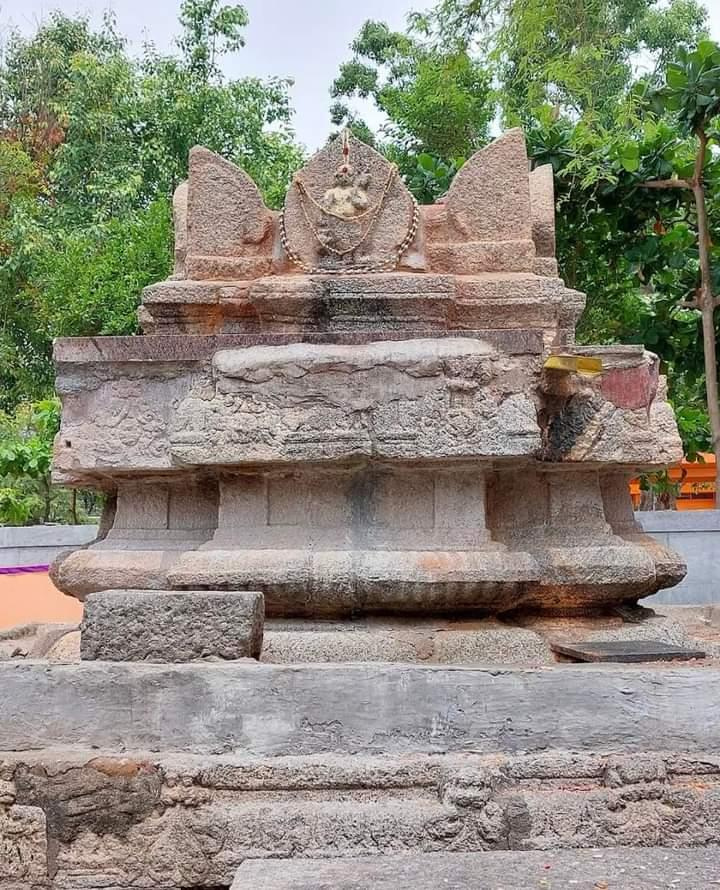
- Brindavana of Raghuttama Tirtha at Manampoondi

Personal life
- Born: Ramachandra; 1527 Malkheda (present-day Sedam Taluk, Kalaburagi district, Karnataka, India)
- Died: 1596 (aged 68–69) Manampoondi, (present-day Kandachipuram taluk of Villupuram district, Tamil Nadu, India)
- Notable work(s): Brihadaranyaka Bhavabodha, Tattvaprakasika Bhavabodha,
- Honors: Bhavabodhacharya

Religious life
- Religion: Hinduism
- Order: Vedanta (Uttaradi Math)
- Philosophy: Dvaita, Vaishnavism

Religious career
- Teacher: Raghuvarya Tirtha
- Successor: Vedavyasa Tirtha
- Disciples: Vedavyasa Tirtha; Raghupati Tirtha; Vedesa Tirtha; Vyasa Ramacharya; Ananda Bhattaraka

Raghuttama Tirtha (Sanskrit:रघूत्तम तीर्थ); IAST:Śrī Raghūttama Tīrtha) (c.1527 – c.1596) (Note: These dates are based on the book, "A History of Indian Philosophy: Volume 4" by Surendranath Dasgupta), also called Bhavabodhacharya, was a Hindu philosopher, scholar, polemicist, commentator, theologian and saint. He served as the fourteenth pontiff of the Uttaradi Matha from 1535 until 1596 and is regarded as an important figures in the lineage of Madhvacharya. His pontificate coincided with a period of political and institutional change following the decline of the Vijayanagara Empire. He is considered to be one of the important and great seers in the history of Dvaita school of thought. He developed the monastic and scholarly institutions of the Uttaradi Matha to support centers of religious and philosophical learning.

Born into a pious Deshastha Brahmin family and was brought up in the matha under the direction of Raghuvarya Tirtha. Raghuttama Tirtha became a prominent scholar of Dvaita Vedanta and composed ten works, nine of which are commentaries on works of Madhvacharya, Padmanabha Tirtha and Jayatirtha. Five of his works bear the title Bhavabodha: the Brihadaranyaka Bhavabodha, Tattvaprakasika Bhavabodha, Nyaya Vivarana Bhavabodha, Gita Bhashya Bhavabodha and Vishnu Tattva Nirnaya Bhavabodha. Prominent Scholar R. Nagaraja Sarma says, The principal aim of the Bhavabodhas was to elucidate (bodha) the deeper, underlying meaning (bhava) embedded in the works of Madhva and Jayatirtha. His Brihadaranyaka Bhavabodha, comprising approximately 9,000 granthas (verses), is regarded as his magnum opus and most extensive work. It explains Madhvacharya's interpretation of the Brihadaranyaka Upanishad and examines the Upanishadic text in relation to other Vedanta interpretations, including that of Shankara. Prominent scholar B. N. K. Sharma regarded the Brihadaranyaka Bhavabodha as an important source for a comparative study of the interpretations of Madhvacharya and Shankara. He drew extensively upon it in his book, The Brihadaranyaka Upanishad Expounded from Sri Madhvacharya's Perspective, alongside Raghavendra Tirtha's gloss on the Upanishad to explain Madhvacharya's interpretation of the Upanishad.

Raghuttama Tirtha was also involved in religious activities such as the consecration of deities and the building of the Raghuttama Agrahara at Mahishi. The intellectual legacy of Dvaita Vedanta was also carried forward by his disciples and successors. Raghuttama Tirtha entered Brindavana at Manampoondi, near Tirukoilur. Raghuttama Tirtha's Brindavana still continues to draw thousands of people from all walks of life, and he is traditionally known to have preached worship of Lord Vishnu irrespective of caste and creed. He is popularly known as a healer and people relate stories of healing and prayer fulfillment through him.

== Biography ==
=== Early life ===
Most of the information about Raghuttama Tirtha's life comes largely from traditional biographical accounts. He was born as Ramachandra in Malkheda in the present-day Kalaburagi district in the state of Karnataka into a Kannada-speaking Deshastha Brahmin family to Subba Bhatta (also known as "Vitthalacharya") and Gangabai. Gangabai was the sister of Raghuvarya Tirtha of Uttaradi Math.

According to traditional accounts, Raghuvarya Tirtha was directed by "divine urge" to visit Svarnavata and bless Gangabai and Subba Bhatta with a offspring. Madhvacharya assured Raghuvarya Tirtha that this child would grow up to spread the teachings of Madhva philosophy. Awaking from this sacred vision, Raghuvarya Tirtha was deeply moved with gratitude. In due course, he visited the village. After that the childless couple approached saint Raghuvarya Tirtha, who granted them boon of children with the condition that their first child, would in turn be handed over to him. These words brought a mixture of happiness and sorrow to the childless couple but they accepted the decree of the divinity. Soon after this incident, Gangabai conceived. Raghuvarya Tirtha was informed accordingly. He returned to the village expecting the birth of the child. A big gold plate was sent to Subba Bhatta's house from the Matha with a direction to receive the child on the golden plate without allowing the child to touch the earth. Accordingly, the child was received on a golden plate. He was named after Rama as Ramachandra by Raghuvarya Tirtha. Raghuvarya Tirtha made arrangements to feed the child every day with the abhishekha milk of the Vyasa Kurma Saligram of the Matha. He had his Upanayana at the age of five and immediately after Upanayana was ordained as a Sannyasa.

==== Dispute at Mannur and divine illumination ====
According to traditional accounts, at the age of 8, Raghuttama Tirtha succeeded his uncle Raghuvarya Tirtha as the head of Uttaradi Math. Raghuttama Tirtha was also a contemporary of Vijayindra Tirtha. Raghuttama Tirtha is said to have studied for sometime after his ordinance and becoming peetadhipati, under a learned Pandit Adya Varadarajacharya of Mannur under the direction of Raghuvarya Tirtha. Following the death of Raghuvarya Tirtha at Anegondi, Raghuttama Tirtha performed his guru's rites at the sacred island of Nava Brindavana. In accordance with the final commands of his preceptor, Raghuttama Tirtha proceeded to Mannur to continue his advanced studies under Adya Varadarajacharya, an accomplished disciple of Raghunatha Tirtha.

At Mannur, a dispute arose leading Varadarajacharya to demand that Raghuttama Tirtha visit his private home for lessons rather than attending upon the matha. When a breach of traditional etiquette occurred on a Sadhana Dwadashi day, Raghuttama Tirtha ceased visiting the teacher's residence. Concerned about his daily scriptural duty (pāṭha-pravacana), the young pontiff sought divine guidance. That night his preceptor Raghuvarya Tirtha appeared to Raghuttama Tirtha in a dream, inscribed the sacred syllable of knowledge (Sarasvatī Bīja-Akṣara) upon his tongue, granting him spontaneous mastery of the scriptures. Raghuvarya Tirtha instructed him to assume the seat of discourse (vyāsapīṭha) next morning and begin teaching the advanced texts directly to his disciples, assuring him that the deepest purports would be revealed to him. Guided through mystical dream visions by his preceptor Raghuvarya Tirtha, Raghuttama Tirtha commenced delivering independent discourses on Jayatirtha's Nyaya Sudha directly from the matha’s dais. Varadarajacharya secretly listened to the pontiff's exposition of the intricate grammatical and philosophical sections and accepted Raghuttama Tirtha as his master.

=== Institutional & Monastic Reforms ===
In response to the moral challenges of the contemporary age, Raghuttama Tirtha implemented extensive administrative and institutional reforms in accordance with his guru's instructions. He transformed the monastic tours by adopting royal insignia, including palanquins, caparisoned elephants, horses, parasols, victory standards, and formal heralds to uphold the institutional dignity of the Vedanta Peetha against haughty officials. He ended the absolute dependence of the pontiffs on external households for daily meals by establishing autonomous kitchen operations (svayampaka) within the matha compound, ensuring strict ritual purity. Furthermore, he appointed branch officers (dharmadhikaris) and established permanent monastic centers in towns and villages across South India.

=== Philosophical Debates & digvijaya ===
Raghuttama Tirtha’s pontificate was characterized by continuous intellectual engagement against contemporary rival philosophical schools, especially Advaita Vedanta and Vishishtadvaita, to establish the supreme doctrine of Tattvavada and Vishnu Sarvottamatva. Rather than engaging primarily in oral disputations himself, his philosophical combat was conducted through his comprehensive sub-commentaries and the active delegation of his trained disciples.

Raghuttama Tirtha ordained his sister's son into sannyasa under the name Raghupati Tirtha and sent him on a tour to carry out regional philosophical debates. During this tour, Raghupati Tirtha encountered a disputant who had defeated a prominent Vishishtadvaita scholar and seized his victory banners, the Hanumaddhvaja and Garudadhvaja. Raghupati Tirtha challenged him, thoroughly routed him using the dialectical training received under Raghuttama Tirtha, confiscated his banners and musical regalia, and presented the captured trophies at his guru's feet.

During the era of Raghuttama Tirtha, the intellectual community was actively engaged in responding to Madhusudana Saraswati's Advaita Siddhi, an extensive non-dualist critique of Sri Vyasatirtha's Nyayamrita. Raghuttama Tirtha guided and instructed the core scholars who provided the definitive Dvaita rejoinders. His disciple Tarangini Ramacharya composed the acclaimed Nyayamrita Tarangini, systematically refuting the Advaita Siddhi and defending Vyasatirtha's work. Concurrently, another foremost student, Pandurangi Ananda Bhattaraka, composed the polemical masterpiece Nyayamrita Kantakoddhara, methodically resolving the philosophical objections raised against Tattvavada.

Through his original written treatises, Raghuttama Tirtha directly engaged opposing philosophies. In his extensive commentary on the Brihadaranyaka Upanishad, which is his magnum opus he systematically quoted, examined, and refuted the non-dualist interpretations of Adi Shankara’s Shankara Bhashya across numerous passages. In his Tattvaprakasika Bhavabodha, he integrated the dialectical methods of Vyasatirtha’s Tatparya Chandrika to resolve purvapaksha arguments throughout the Brahma Sutras, demonstrating that the entirety of Vedic revelation points exclusively to Lord Narayana. A celebrated biographical account involves Rotti Venkatadri Bhatta, a devoted young kitchen assistant in the matha who had spent years making rotis without formal literacy. Moved by his intense devotion and desire for knowledge, Raghuttama Tirtha blessed him, miraculously enabling him to expound the intricate Nyaya Sudha before a gathering of scholars. Venkatadri Bhatta subsequently authored respected sub-commentaries on the Tattvasankhyana, Tattvodyota, and Karmanirnaya, as well as an authoritative treatise on Dinattraya Nirnaya that was cited by later pontiffs such as Vidyadhisha Tirtha.

=== Consecrations and Shrine Developments ===
Raghuttama Tirtha made an extended encampment at the premier Vaishnavite pilgrimage center of Srirangam, situated on the banks of the Kaveri River. It was during his residence at the Srirangam Uttaradi Matha premises that he authored the five major treatises of Bhavabodhas corpus-most notably his monumental commentaries on Madhvacharya and Jayatirtha works. Before starting to write his Bhavabodhas, Raghuttama Tirtha consecrated and installed a deity of Hanuman (Mukhyaprana) at the Uttaradi Matha located on North Chitra Street, adjacent to the Sri Ranganathaswamy Temple complex. This Anjaneya deity is also revered as Grantha Sakshi Anjaneya or Bhavabodha Anjaneya, signifying the deity's role as the divine witness and presiding inspiration for the composition of his Bhavabodha commentaries.

During his return from a pilgrimage to Udupi, Raghuttama Tirtha visited the town of Mahishi. According to traditional accounts, he was divinely guided to establish a settlement for Vedic scholars and recognized the need to support traditional scholarship and preserve Vedic pedagogy. He subsequently established a residential settlement for Vedic scholars known as Raghuttama Agrahara at Mahishi, on the banks of the Tunga River in present-day Shivamogga district, Karnataka. He endowed the agrahara with residential quarters and agricultural lands to support learned Dvaita families engaged in Shastric teaching and daily ritual observance. The settlement later became a significant centre of Dvaita scholarship and the site of the moola brindavanas of pontiffs such as Satyasandha Tirtha. A stone icon of Raghuttama Tirtha is also preserved at Mahishi.

In the course of his pontifical travels across the Kaveri basin in Tamil Nadu, Raghuttama Tirtha visited the town of Chintalavadi (in modern-day Karur district), he consecrated and installed a sacred deity of Lakshmi Narayana and organized regular worship protocols for the local community.

== Works ==
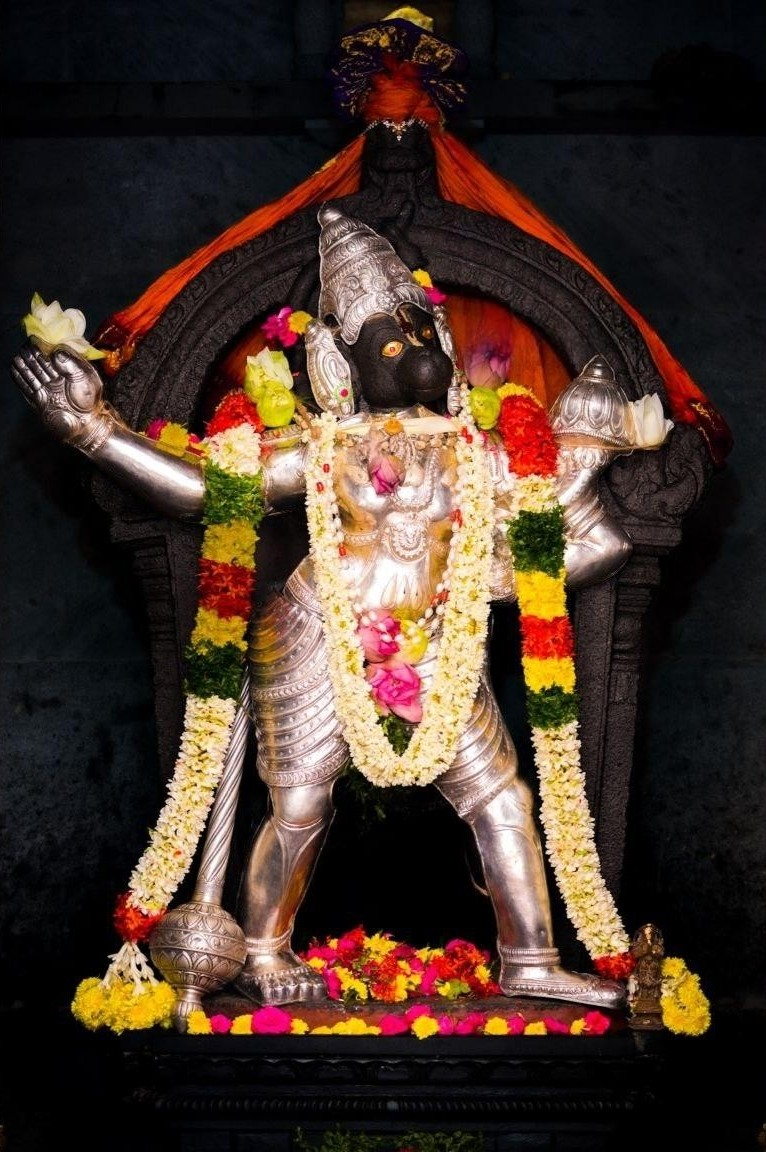
Shri Raghuttama Tirtha Prathistita Shri Bhavabodha Anjaneya at Srirangam, Tamil Nadu.

There have been 10 works accredited to Raghuttama Tirtha, 9 of which are commentaries on the works of Madhvacharya, Padmanabha Tirtha and Jayatirtha. Bhavabodha is the general title for five of his works. Raghuttama Tirtha composed these Bhavabhodhas to reveal the essence and deeper meanings of Shri Madhvacharya's and Sri Jayatirtha's works, because of this he is popularly referred as "Bhavabodhakara" or "Bhavabodhacharya". His work Brihadaranyaka Bhavabodha is a commentary on Madhva's Brihadaranyaka Upanishad Bhashya, is considered to be his magnum opus. Running up to 9,000 granthas, it discusses Khandana and Bhashyartha of the Upanishad. His work Tattvaprakasika Bhavabodha is a commentary on Jayatirtha's Tattvaprakāśikā. It runs nearly 8100 granthas. It is quoted by Jagannatha Tirtha in his Bhashyadipika four times and by Raghavendra Tirtha once in his Tatparya Chandrika Prakasha.

Name	Description	References
Brihadaranyaka Bhavabodha	Commentary on Brihadaranyaka Upanishad Bhashya of Madhvacharya	
Gītābhāṣya Bhavabodha (Prameyadīpikā Bhavabodha)	Gloss on Jayatirtha's Gītābhāṣya Prameyadīpikā	
Viṣṇutattvanirṇaya Bhavabodha	Gloss on Viṣṇutattvanirṇayaṭikā of Jayatirtha	
Tattvaprakasika Bhavabodha	Super-commentary on Tattvaprakāśikā of Jayatirtha	
Nyāyavivarana Bhavabodha	Direct commentary on Nyāya Vivarana of Madhvacharya, in continuation to Jayatirtha work to Nyāyavivaranaṭikā	
Taittirīyavinirṇaya	Commentary on Taittiriya Upanishad Bhashya of Madhvacharya	
Nyāyaratna Sambandhadipikā	Commentary on Anu Vyakhyana, showing at the same time the inter-connection between the words of Madhva and Sutras of Badarayana.	
Vivaraṇoddharā	Gloss on the passages of Nyāya Vivarana which was commented by Jayatirtha in his Tattvaprakāśikā	
Sanyayavivruthi	Commentary on Sanyaya Ratnavali of Padmanabha Tirtha	
Tāratamya Stotram	Prayer explaining the hierarchy of gods	

=== Brihadaranyaka Bhavabodha ===
B. N. K. Sharma describes the Brihadaranyaka Upanishad Bhashya Bhavabodha or Brihadaranyaka Bhavabodha as Raghuttama Tirtha's "magnum opus" with approximately 9,000 granthas and commentary on Madhva's Brihadaranyaka Upanishad Bhashya. Few commentators in the Dvaita tradition attempt what this text sustains from beginning to end: a double exposition that simultaneously establishes the plain meaning of the Upanishad and dismantles, at every contested juncture, the readings advanced against it. Its defining achievement is the rigor and completeness with which it engages Shankara. Rather than treating the Advaita position as a foil to be dispatched in passing, the work pulls Shankara's own Brihadaranyaka Bhasya into direct, sustained confrontation, tracking it page by page and answering it point for point.

The commentary also draws together passages from Jayatirtha's commentary on the Kathālakṣaṇa, Anuvyākhyāna, and Isha Upanishad, incorporating the earlier interpretations in the work. Glossing the term गोष्ठ ("goṣṭha") in Bṛhadāraṇyaka Upaniṣad III.1, Raghuttama Tirtha records the interpretation to his own teacher Raghuvarya Tirtha.

== Brindavana ==
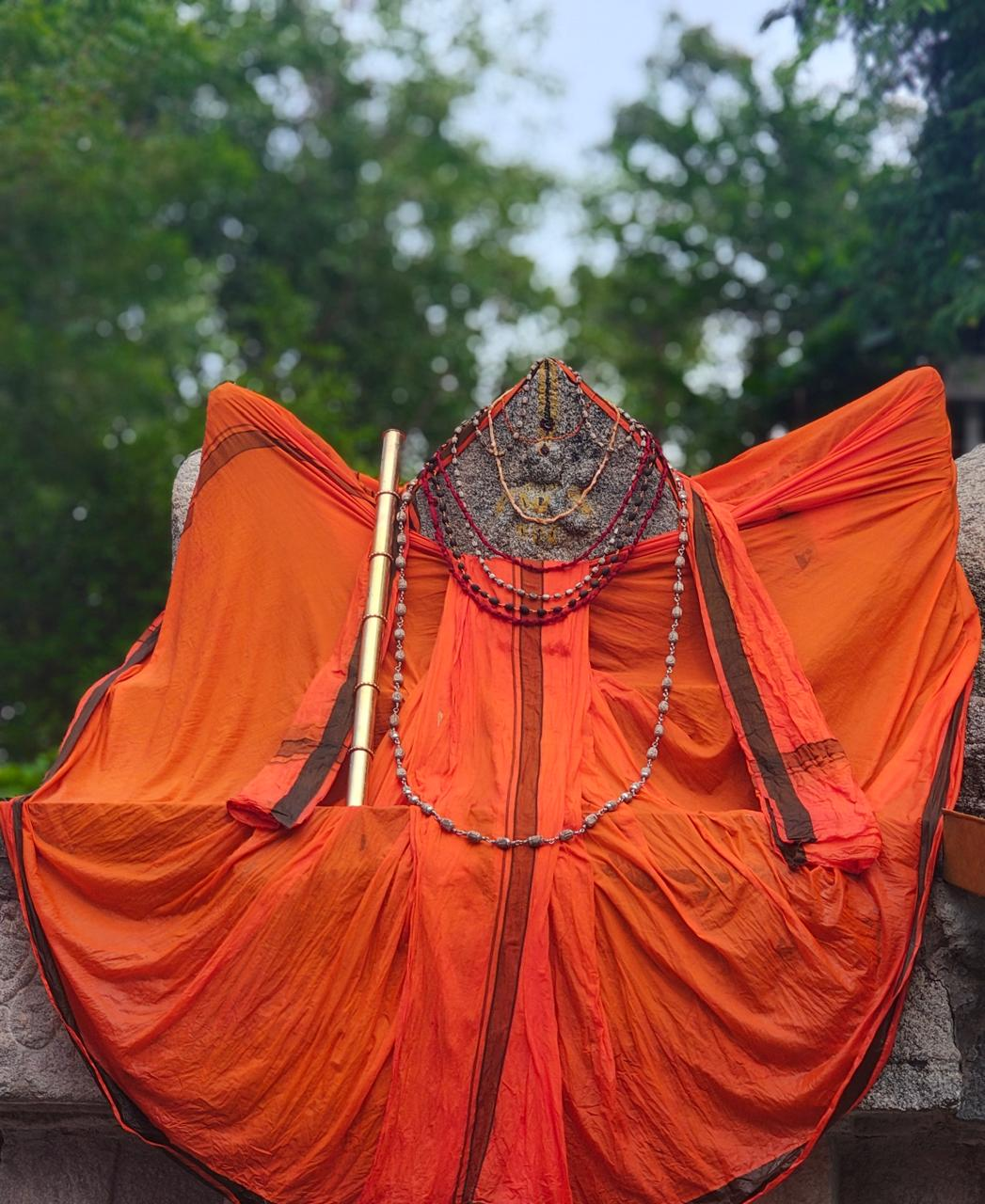
Moola Brindavana of Raghuttama Tirtha at Manampoondi, near Tirukoilur

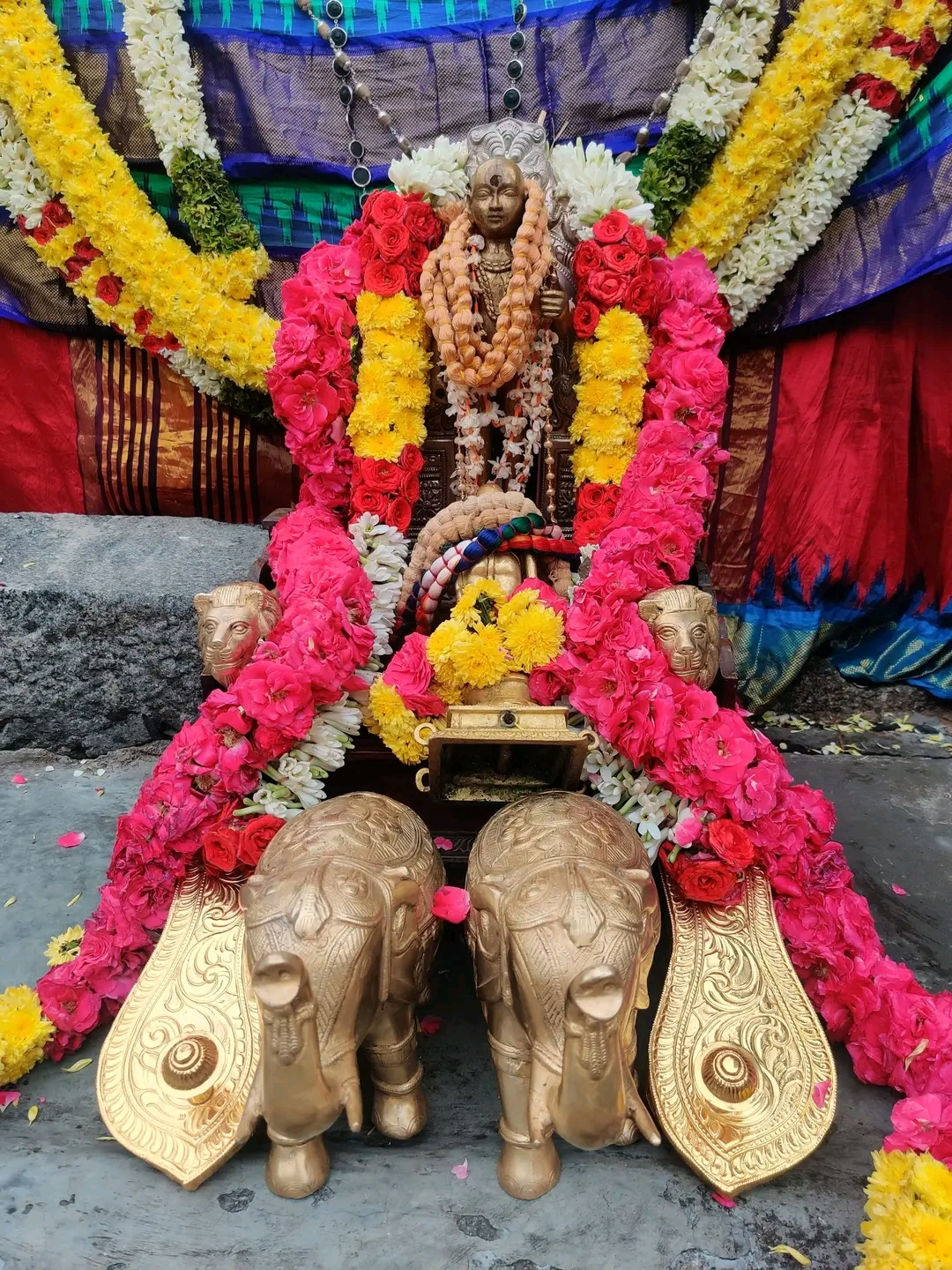
Raghuttama Tirtha's idol and Padukas (sacred sandals) at his Brindavana, Manampoondi.

Having adorned the sacred pontifical seat of the revered Uttaradi Matha and after transferring the pontifical authority of the primary monastic seat to his chief disciple, Vedavyasa Tirtha, the venerable Raghuttama Tirtha, as per the divine will, desired to enter the Brindavana. He then appeared in a dream to the Zamindar of Vettavalam (now in Tiruvannamalai District) and instructed him to construct a Brindavana at Manampoondi, a village near Tirukoilur, on the bank of the South Pennar. Manampoondi is a holy place where Shri Galava Rishi once resided. The site is also described in the scriptures as the ‘Pancha Krishnaranya Kshetra’. Raghuttama Tirtha entered Brindavana in 1596 on the auspicious day of Vaikuntha Ekadashi.

Directly north of the open-air sanctum at Manampoondi stands a sacred tamarind tree (tintriṇī vṛkṣa) noted for a persistent botanical anomaly. Monastic chronicles and regional records state that whenever branches extend southward to cast shade over the brindavana, they wither and dry up spontaneously before casting any shadow upon the Brindavana.

=== British officer incident ===
During the British Raj, the colonial administration decided to construct a bridge across the river at Manampoondi, with the engineer's blueprint requiring the demolition of Raghuttama Tirtha’s moola brindavana. After the authorities served an official demolition notice, the peetadhipati and officials of the Uttaradi Matha gathered at the sanctum in deep prayer, placing their complete surrender before the Brindavana of Raghuttama Tirtha. That night the British officer had a dream in which Raghuttama Tirtha appeared directly and spoke to him in fluent English. Raghuttama Tirtha told him to stop the demolition and at the same time showed him an alternative plan for the building which left the holy shrine untouched. Awakening in profound awe and reverence, the British engineer arrived at the brindavana the following morning, offered humble prostrations (namaskara), apologized to the matha authorities, and strictly executed the alternate route given by the Swamiji. Even now, the bridge which has been diverted still lies outside the Brindavana complex as a lasting testament to this incident.

=== Livestock healing traditions ===
Local agrarian and pastoral communities in the surrounding rural regions of Tirukoilur, irrespective of community or caste background, maintain an active custom of bringing cattle afflicted with illnesses or suffering from bovine epidemics directly to the shrine complex. The owners lead the afflicted cows, oxen, and calves in ritual circumambulation (pradakṣiṇa) around the perimeter of the brindavana compound to seek spiritual healing. Local tradition holds that simple circumambulation of the sanctum relieves livestock of ailments and protects herds from contagious diseases, making the shrine an important center of veterinary pilgrimage among regional farmers.

=== Resolution of Dialectical and Scholarly Doubts ===
Monastic tradition records instances where scholars and commentators struggling to comprehend complex dialectical passages in the works of Madhvacharya or Nyaya Sudha or the Bhavabodhas corpus performed Seva and observed fasts at the Moola Brindavana Manampoondi shrine, subsequently receiving intuitive resolution and clarity through dream visions.

== Legacy ==
After Jayatirtha, Raghuttama Tirtha became Tika-kara and is referred to as Bhavabodhacharya. Sharma writes "His language is simple and precise. He makes his points forcefully. He quotes often from certain unidentified sources not cited by any other commentator". Raghuttama Tirtha is regarded as a saint known for preaching the worship of Lord Vishnu regardless of caste or creed. His shrine in Tirukoilur at present has become a holy seat of pilgrimage and a vast number of devotees belonging to all castes and creeds perform seva even today. Guru Raghuttama Tirtha is known as a healer. Thousands of devotees who go to his Brindavana are a proof of his divine power and a kind heart to bless his devotees. He has made dumb to speak, mad to be intelligent, childless to beget progeny. None of his devotees have returned in disappointment.

=== Intellectual and scholarly influence ===
Raghuttama Tirtha, through his commentaries contributed to the transmission of Madhvacharya's philosophy. Several commentators developed under his tutelage. His disciples were scholars who composed commentaries on Dvaita philosophical texts and participated in debates with other Vedanta schools. Raghupathi Tirtha (a sannyasi), Vedavyasa Tirtha, Vedesa Tirtha, Vyasa Ramacharya, Ananda Bhattaraka (father of Vidyadhisha Tirtha), Rotti Venkatabhatta who all made a name as commentators were trained by Raghuttama Tirtha.

When Madhusūdana Sarasvatī composed Advaitasiddhi, a line-by-line refutation of Nyayamṛta of Vyasatirtha, Vyasa Ramacharya and Ananda Bhattaraka, wrote Nyayamṛta Tarangini and Nyayamṛta Kantakoddhara and challenged Madhusūdana Sarasvatī.

== Sources ==
- Sharma, B. N. Krishnamurti (2000), A History of the Dvaita School of Vedānta and Its Literature, Vol 1. 3rd Edition, Motilal Banarsidass (2008 Reprint), ISBN 978-8120815759
- Prabhanjanacharya, Vyasanakere (2013), Sri Raghuttama Tirtharu, ISBN 9789381826102
- Prabhanjanacharya, Vyaaanakere (2005), Sri Raghuttama Tirtharu, Sri Vyasa Madhva Samshodana Parishad, ISBN 9789381826102
- Sharma, B. N. K. (1988), The Brihadaranyaka Upanishad expounded from Sri Madhvacharya's perspective, Dvaita Vedanta and Research Foundation
- Dasgupta, Surendranath (1975), A History of Indian Philosophy, Volume 4, Motilal Banarsidass Publishers, ISBN 978-8120804159
- Brück, Regina von; Brück, Michael von (2011). Life in the Power of Rituals : Religion and Spirituality in India. CHBeck. ISBN 978-3406612428.
- Sarma, R. Nagaraja (1956). Tattvaprakāśikā-vyākhya Bhavabodhah. Government Oriental Manuscripts Library.
- Hebbar, B.N (2005), The Sri-Krsna Temple at Udupi: The History and Spiritual Center of the Madhvite Sect of Hinduism, Bharatiya Granth Nikethan, ISBN 81-89211-04-8
- Okita, Kiyokazu (2014). Hindu Theology in Early Modern South Asia: The Rise of Devotionalism and the Politics of Genealogy. Oxford University Press. ISBN 978-0198709268.
- Dasgupta, Surendranath (1949). A History of Indian Philosophy: Volume 4. Cambridge University Press.
- Rao, C. R. (1984). Srimat Uttaradi Mutt: Moola Maha Samsthana of Srimadjagadguru Madhvacharya.
