= Yadavarya =

Hindu scholar

Bidarahalli Yadavarya

Personal life
- Born: Bidarahalli Yadupati Acharya (Yadappa Nayak); 1580 Yekkundi, Saundatti taluk, Belgaum district, Karnataka, India
- Died: 1630 (aged 49–50)

Religious life
- Religion: Hinduism
- Philosophy: Dvaita Vedanta

Religious career
- Teacher: Vedesa Tirtha
- Disciples: Bidarahalli Srinivasa Tirtha, Sarkara Srinivasa, Lingeri Srinivasa

Bidarahalli Yadupati Acharya (popularly known as Yadavarya or Yadavaryaru) (also known as Yadavacharya) (c. 1580 - c. 1630) was an Indian Hindu scholar in the Dvaita Vedānta tradition. He is the follower of Uttaradi Math and the disciple of Vedesa Tirtha.

== Life ==
According to hagiographies, Yadupati was born in Kannada-speaking Deshastha Brahmin family in 1580 in a village called Yekkundi which is located in Saundatti taluk of Belgaum district. His father name is Yadappayya. His cousin Bidarahalli Srinivasa Tirtha, who is also his disciple was also a Tikakara who composed many works.

== Works ==
There have been many works accredited to Yadavarya, most of which are glosses, polemical tracts and commentaries. His gloss on Tattva Sankhyana of Madhva runs to 300 granthas. He also made a commentary on Tattvoddyota of Madhva. His Nyayasudha Tippani by the nane "Yadupatya", a commentary on Nyayasudha of Jayatirtha is the most important of his works. This commentary is distinctly anterior to that of Raghavendra Tirtha and also perhaps to that of Vidyadhisha Tirtha. He tried to overthrow the objection raised by a critic Appayya Dikshita alleging misrepresentations of the Mīmāṃsāka view in Anuvyakhyana of Madhva. Yadupati made two commentaries on the Bhagavata, a work on Bhagvata Tatparya Nirnaya of Madhva and a work on Bhagavata Purana. He also wrote a commentary on Yamakabharata. There are few minor works ascribed to him one is a commentary on Sadachara Smruti of Madhva and other are praise-poems Vishnu Stotra, Karavalambana Stotra, Daridra Hara Stotra, and Vedavyasa Gadya.

== Bibliography ==
- Sharma, B. N. Krishnamurti (2000). A History of the Dvaita School of Vedānta and Its Literature, Vol 1. 3rd Edition. Motilal Banarsidass (2008 Reprint). ISBN 978-8120815759.
- Larson, Gerald James (1970). The Encyclopedia of Indian philosophies, Volume 1. American Institute of Indian Studies.
- Potter, Karl H. (2015). Encyclopedia of Indian Philosophies: Dvaita Vedanta Philosophy (Vol- XVIII). Motilal Banarsidass Publishers. ISBN 978-8120836464.
