= Sudha Parimala =

- Author: Raghavendra Tirtha
- Language: Sanskrit
- Subject: Hindu philosophy
- Genre: Dvaita Vedanta
- Publisher: Original: 17th century
- Publication place: India

Sudha Parimala is a Sanskrit work on Dvaita philosophy written by Raghavendra Swami. It is a lucid adaptation of the well-known commentary on Jayatirthas Nyaya Sudha, which is a commentary on Madhvacharya's Anu Vyakhyana.
