= Bidarahalli Srinivasa Tirtha =

Hindu scholar

Personal life
- Born: Bidarahalli Srinivasacharya; 1600 Bidarahalli
- Died: 1660 (aged 59–60) Bidarahalli

Religious life
- Religion: Hinduism
- Philosophy: Dvaita, Vaishnavism

Religious career
- Teacher: Yadavarya

Bidarahalli Srinivasa Tirtha (alias Bidarahalli Srinivasacharya) (c. 1600 - c. 1660) was an Indian Hindu scholar and theologian in the Dvaita Vedānta tradition. He is a prolific glossator of the early 17th century. He is the follower of Uttaradi Math and the disciple of Yadupati. According to tradition, Raghavendra Tirtha conferred on him the ascetic title of "Tirtha" by way of appreciation of his learning and contributions.

== Works ==
There have been 37 works accredited to Srinivasacharya, most of which are glosses and enjoy widest popularity among the followers of Madhva, on account of their simplicity and directness of exposition. Srinivasa wrote glosses on all ten Prakaranas Granthas. His work on Pramānalaksanam of Madhva known as Vakyarthakaumudi runs to 3000 granthas. His work on Viṣṇutattvanirṇayaṭikā of Jayatirtha known as Vakyarthadipika is a voluminous work and runs to 6700 granthas. His gloss on Karma Nirnaya of Madhva runs to 700 granthas. His commentary on Tattvoddyotaṭikā of Jayatirtha is a supplent to that of Vedesa's, explaining passages not covered by the latter as well as those which remain stiff even after his explanation. Srinivasa Tirtha wrote glosses on six out of ten Mukhya Upanishads excepting Katha, Prashna, Chandogya and Brihadaranyaka. His gloss on Aitareya Upanishad known as Aithareyabhashyartharatnamala runs to 7000 granthas and is a voluminous work. Tattvabodhini is his commentary on Anubhasya of Madhva. His gloss on Nyayasudha of Jayatirtha, is sort of complement to the commentary of Yadupati and is much indebted to it, following it rather closely.

== Bibliography ==
- Sharma, B. N. Krishnamurti (2000). A History of the Dvaita School of Vedānta and Its Literature, Vol 1. 3rd Edition. Motilal Banarsidass (2008 Reprint). ISBN 978-8120815759.
- Larson, Gerald James (1970). The Encyclopedia of Indian philosophies, Volume 1. American Institute of Indian Studies. ISBN 9788120804265.
- Potter, Karl H. (2015). Encyclopedia of Indian Philosophies: Dvaita Vedanta Philosophy (Vol- XVIII). Motilal Banarsidass Publishers. ISBN 978-8120836464.
