= Vedesa Tirtha =

Saint Philosopher Mystic

Vedesha Tirtha

Personal life
- Born: Seenappa Nayak; 1570
- Died: 1620 (aged 49–50) Mannur

Religious life
- Religion: Hinduism
- Philosophy: Dvaita Vedanta

Religious career
- Teacher: Raghuttama Tirtha
- Disciples: Yadavarya

Vedesha Tirtha (c. 1570 - c. 1620) (also known as Vedesha Bhiksu also spelled Vedesha Bikshu), was an Indian Hindu scholar and theologian in the Dvaita Vedānta tradition. He was the disciple of Raghuttama Tirtha, and is the most celebrated name in the annals of the Dvaita Vedanta. He is a Bidi-Sanyasi (stray ascetic) and not pontiff of any matha (monastery).

== Early life ==
Vedesa was born in 1570 CE in a pious Kannada-speaking Deshastha Brahmin family in present day North Karnataka region. He studied under the guidance of Raghuttama Tirtha and was his disciple. He wrote many commentaries on the Upanishads and other prominent works. He died in 1620 and his tomb is enshrined in Manur in present day North Karnataka, where he studied all shastras under Raghuttama Tirtha Mahaswamiji.

== Works ==
Vedesha Bhiksu composed ten major works, most of them are commentaries and glosses on the works of Madhva and Jayatirtha.

- Tattvoddyota Panchika - a gloss on Tattvoddyota of Madhva
- Pramāṇalakṣaṇaṭikā Vyakhyana - a gloss on Pramāṇalakṣaṇaṭikā of Jayatirtha
- Viṣṇutattvanirṇayaṭikā Vyakhyana - a gloss on Viṣṇutattvanirṇayaṭikā of Jayatirtha
- Kathālakṣaṇavivarana Vyakhyana - a gloss on Kathālakṣaṇavivarana of Jayatirtha.
- Karmaṅirṅayaṭikā Vyakhyana - a gloss on Karmaṅirṅayaṭikā of Jayatirtha.
- Aitareya Upanishad Bhashya - a commentary on Aitareya Upanishad Bhashya of Madhva
- Chandogya Upanishad Bhashya - a commentary on Chandogya Upanishad Bhashya of Madhva
- Katha Upanishad Bhashya - a commentary on Katha Upanishad Bhashya of Madhva
- Talabavara tippani - a commentary on Kena Upanishad Bhashya of Madhva.
- Pramāṇapaddhatī Vyakhyana - a gloss on Pramāṇapaddhatī of Jayatirtha

== Brindavana ==
His Brindavana is at Manur on the bank of Bhima river, which was a center of learning right from the days of predecessors of Raghuttama Tirtha himself.

== Bibliography ==
- Sharma, B. N. Krishnamurti (2000). A History of the Dvaita School of Vedānta and Its Literature, Vol 1. 3rd Edition. Motilal Banarsidass (2008 Reprint). ISBN 978-8120815759.
- Potter, Karl H. (1995). Encyclopedia of Indian philosophies. 1, Bibliography : Section 1, Volumes 1-2. Motilal Banarsidass Publications. ISBN 978-8120803084.
- Dasgupta, Surendranath (1975). A History of Indian Philosophy, Volume 4. Motilal Banarsidass. ISBN 978-8120804159.
- White, Charles S. J. (2004), A Catalogue of Vaiṣṇava Literature on Microfilms in the Adyar Library, The Bodleian Library & The American University Library, Motilal Banarsidass Publications, ISBN 978-8120820678
