= Raghuvarya Tirtha =

Hindu philosopher and theologian, guru

Sri Raghuvarya Tirtha
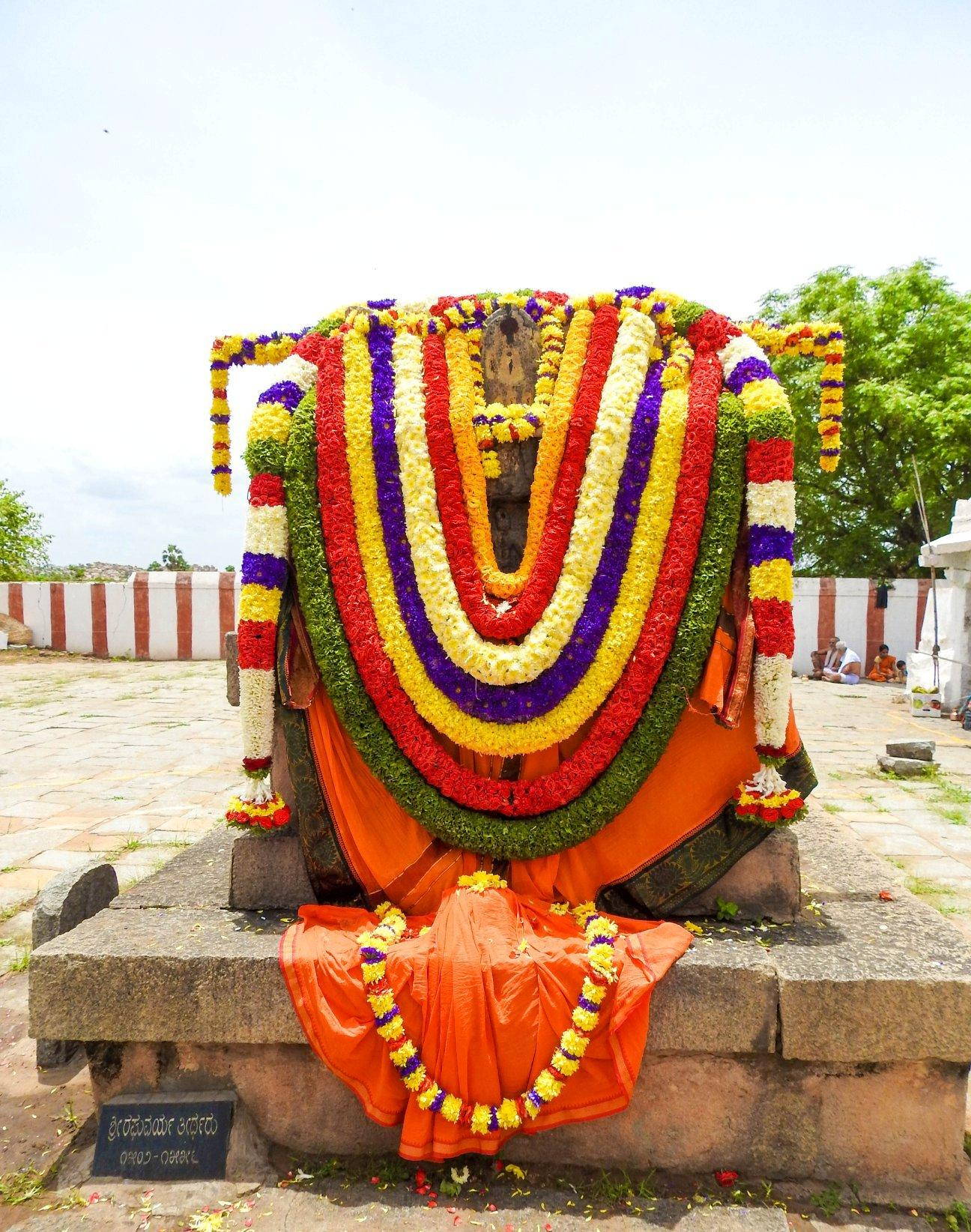
- Brindavana (tomb) of Sri Raghuvarya Tirtha at Nava Brindavana, Anegondi

Personal life
- Born: Ramachandra Shastri; 1462 CE Mannur, Bijapur district, Karnataka, India
- Died: 1535 CE Hampi
- Resting place: Nava Brindavana

Religious life
- Religion: Hinduism
- Order: Vedanta (Uttaradi Math)
- Philosophy: Dvaita, Vaishnavism

Religious career
- Teacher: Raghunatha Tirtha
- Successor: Raghuttama Tirtha
- Disciples: Raghuttama Tirtha

Raghuvarya Tirtha (c.1462 - c.1535) was a Hindu philosopher, scholar, theologian and saint. He served as the pontiff of Shri Uttaradi Math from 1502 to 1535. He was the thirteenth in succession from Madhvacharya. According to tradition Sri Raghuvarya Tirtha taught the famous Nyayasudha of Jayatirtha seven times to his disciples.

== Career ==
=== Works ===
Raghuvarya Tirtha composed many works but some of his extant works are Laghupariksa (or Raghupariksa) on nyaya, a commentary on Narayanapanditacarya's Prameyaratnamalika, Krishna Stuti a devotional Stuti on Krishna, and Madhwashtakam, a praise hymn on Madhvacharya.

== Bibliography ==
- Sharma, B. N. Krishnamurti (2000). A History of the Dvaita School of Vedānta and Its Literature, Vol 1. 3rd Edition. Motilal Banarsidass (2008 Reprint). ISBN 978-8120815759.
- Samuel, G. John (1997). Contribution of Karaṇāṭaka to Sanskrit. Institute of Asian Studies.
- Das, Sambidānanda (1972). Sri Chaitanya Mahaprabhu. Sree Gaudiya Math.
- Puri, Swami B. P. (2017), Guru: The Universal Teacher, Simon and Schuster, ISBN 978-1683832454
