= Tāpatraya =

Tāpatraya refers to the three sources of Tāpa (literally, heat, or suffering) recognised in Hindu philosophy:

1. Ādhyātmika — the suffering caused by 'internal' factors like diseases
2. Ādhibhoutika — the suffering caused by physical forces such as earthquakes etc.
3. Ādhidaivika — the suffering caused by Karmic factors
