= Bidrahalli =

Bengaluru Urban district, Village in Karnataka, India

BIDARAPALLI
- City
- Country: India
- State: Andhra Pradesh
- District: Chittoor district
- Talukas: Chittoor East

Languages
  - Official: Telugu
- Time zone: UTC+5:30 (IST)
- Postal code: 560049

BIDARAPALLI (బిదరపల్లి ) is a Bidarahalli village is also a gram panchayat.The total geographical area of village is 370.34 hectares. Hobali Headquarter in Chittoor district Pin Code 560049 in the southern state of Andhra Pradesh, India.
