= Raghunatha Tirtha =

Hindu guru

Sri Raghunatha Tirtha

Personal life
- Born: Vishnu Shastri; 1405 Bijapur, Bijapur district, Karnataka
- Died: 1502 (aged 96–97) Malakheda, Karnataka

Religious life
- Religion: Hinduism
- Order: Vedanta (Uttaradi Math)
- Philosophy: Dvaita, Vaishnavism

Religious career
- Teacher: Vidyanidhi Tirtha
- Successor: Raghuvarya Tirtha
- Disciples: Raghuvarya Tirtha

Shri Raghunatha Tirtha (IAST:Śrī Raghunātha Tīrtha) (c.1405 – c.1502), was a Hindu philosopher, scholar and saint. He served as the pontiff of Uttaradi Math from 1442–1502. He was the 19th in succession from Madhvacharya.

== Life ==
Raghunatha Tirtha was a contemporary of Vibhudendra Tirtha, the progenitor of the Raghavendra Math and Sripadaraja, a pontiff of mutt at Mulbagal (now known by the name Sripadaraja Mutt), Vyasatirtha and Purandara Dasa. It so happened that when Lakshminarayana Tirtha was initiated in renunciation and recognised as Svarnavarna Tirtha's successor to pontificate, he was sent to Vibhudendra Tirtha for higher learning, where he became an expert in Dvaita system. A test of his knowledge was held under supervision of Raghunatha Tirtha. Lakshminarayana excelled in the test by commenting upon a major text of the system. It was Raghunatha Tirtha who conferred upon him the name Sripadaraja or Sripadaraya. Sripadarajashtakam also mentions Sripadaraja's joint pilgrimage with Raghunatha Tirtha to Benares. Sripadaraja was a close associate of Raghunatha Tirtha. Raghunatha Tirtha died in 1502 and his mortal remains were enshrined in the mutt at Malkheda. He was succeeded by his disciple.

== Works ==
- Puja-vidhi, a treatise on Āhnika rites.

== Bibliography ==
- Sharma, B.N.K (2000) [1961]. History of Dvaita school of Vedanta and its Literature, Vol 2 (3rd ed.). Bombay: Motilal Banarasidass. ISBN 81-208-1575-0.
- Devadevan, Manu V. (2016). A Prehistory of Hinduism. Walter de Gruyter GmbH & Co KG. ISBN 978-3110517378.
- Dasgupta, Surendranath (1991), A History of Indian Philosophy, Volume 4, Motilal Banarsidass Publishers, ISBN 978-8120804159
- Naqvī, Ṣādiq; Rao, V. Kishan (2005). A Thousand Laurels--Dr. Sadiq Naqvi: Studies on Medieval India with Special Reference to Deccan, Volume 2. Department of Ancient Indian History, Culture & Archaeology, Osmania University.
- Glasenapp, Helmuth Von (1992). Madhva's Philosophy of the Viṣṇu Faith. Dvaita Vedanta Studies and Research Foundation.
