= Problem of evil in Hinduism =

The standard problem of evil found in monotheistic religions does not apply to almost all traditions of Hinduism because it does not posit an omniscient, omnipotent, omnibenevolent creator.

Scholars have proposed alternate forms of the problem of evil based on Hinduism's karma and transmigration doctrines. According to Arthur Herman, karma-transmigration theory solves all three historical formulations to the problem of evil while acknowledging the theodicy insights of Adi Shankara and Ramanuja.

== Applicability ==
Hinduism is a complex religion with many different currents or schools. Its non-theist traditions such as Samkhya, early Nyaya, Mimamsa and many within Vedanta do not posit the existence of an almighty, omnipotent, omniscient, omnibenevolent god (monotheistic god), and the classical formulations of the problem of evil and theodicy do not apply to most Hindu traditions. Further, deities in Hinduism are neither eternal nor omnipotent nor omniscient nor omnibenevolent. Devas are mortal and subject to samsara. Evil as well as good, along with suffering is considered real and caused by human free will, its source and consequences explained through the karma doctrine of Hinduism, as in other Indian religions.

Both evil (agha, अघ) and suffering (dukkha, दुःख) are extensively discussed in ancient and medieval Hindu texts. However, neither good nor evil, neither bliss nor suffering are linked to gods or god, but considered a part of the innate nature of living in the Saṃsāra cycle of rebirths. In Hindu thought, some suffering is self-caused (karma in this life or past life, either intentionally or from ignorance), some caused by evilness of others, some are natural (aging, disease, natural disasters). Some texts include the actions or influence of supernatural forces on evil experienced by man. One text of the ancient Samkhya school of Hinduism, for example describes three kinds of suffering: first, of body and mind caused by diseases or personal behavior such as anger, greed, delusion, etc.; second, suffering caused by other beings such as men, beasts, reptiles etc.; third, suffering caused by the influence of yaksha, planets and such forces. The Hindu texts describe and discuss suffering caused by both moral evils and natural evils.

Hinduism and other Indian religions do not focus on the problem of evil as formulated in monotheistic religions, by attempting to reconcile the nature of one all-powerful, all-seeing, all-benevolent god with existence of evil. Rather, they focus on the path to spiritual liberation called moksha, one that grants bliss in the present life such that evil and suffering have no effect on the liberated person's state of inner peace and happiness, and attaining moksha also means an end to the cycle of rebirth. In theistic devotional sub-traditions of Hinduism, the personal god such as Krishna or Shiva or Devi is believed by the Hindu to stand by, as a form of spiritual support and liberator, when one faces evil and suffers.

== Problem of Injustice in the Brahma sutras ==
A version of the problem of evil appears in the ancient Brahma Sutras, probably composed between 200 BCE and 200 CE, a foundational text of the Vedanta tradition of Hinduism. Its verses 2.1.34 through 2.1.36 aphoristically mention a version of the problem of suffering and evil in the context of the abstract metaphysical Hindu concept of Brahman. The verse 2.1.34 of Brahma Sutras asserts that inequality and cruelty in the world cannot be attributed to the concept of Brahman, and this is in the Vedas and the Upanishads. In his interpretation and commentary on the Brahma Sutras, the 8th-century scholar Adi Shankara states that just because some people are happier than others and just because there is so much malice, cruelty and pain in the world, some state that Brahman cannot be the cause of the world. Shankara attributes evil and cruelty in the world to Karma of oneself, of others, and to ignorance, delusion and wrong knowledge, but not to the abstract Brahman. Shankara develops the argument that God is not the Brahman, and that "a loving and good God could not have created the universe", a position held by Advaita Vedanta school of Hinduism.

For that would lead to the possibility of partiality and cruelty. For it can be reasonably concluded that God has passion and hatred like some ignoble persons... Hence there will be a nullification of God's nature of extreme purity, (unchangeability), etc., [...] And owing to infliction of misery and destruction on all creatures, God will be open to the charge of pitilessness and extreme cruelty, abhorred even by a villain. Thus on account of the possibility of partiality and cruelty, God is not an agent.

— Adi Shankara, Translated by Arvind Sharma

In other words, in the Brahma Sutras, the formulation of problem of evil is considered a metaphysical construct, but not a moral issue. Ramanuja of the theistic Sri Vaishnavism school – a major tradition within Vaishnavism – interprets the same verse in the context of Vishnu, and asserts that Vishnu only creates potentialities.

According to Swami Gambhirananda, Sankara's commentary explains that God cannot be charged with partiality or cruelty (i.e. injustice) on account of his taking the factors of virtuous and vicious actions (Karma) performed by an individual in previous lives. If an individual experiences pleasure or pain in this life, it is due to virtuous or vicious action (Karma) done by that individual in a past life

Ramanuja of the theistic Sri Vaishnavism school interprets the same verse in the context of Vishnu, and asserts that Vishnu only creates potentialities. According to Arvind Sharma, Shankara's Advaita Vedanta school does not attribute the evil and suffering to the abstract concept of Brahman, but to ignorance, delusion and wrong knowledge. The universe and all existence is without a beginning or end, and Brahman is everything before and after that beginning, before and after the end. Further, in Hindu thought, neither evil nor error are final, all happiness and suffering is impermanent, and truth ultimately triumphs.

== Karma doctrine and the problem of evil ==
The theory of karma refers to the spiritual principle of cause and effect where intent and actions of an individual (cause) influence the future of that individual (effect). The problem of evil, in the context of karma, has been long discussed in Indian religions such as Buddhism, Hinduism and Jainism, both in its theistic and non-theistic schools; for example, in Uttara Mīmāṃsā Sutras Book 2 Chapter 1; the 8th century arguments by Adi Sankara in Brahmasutrabhasya where he posits that God cannot reasonably be the cause of the world because there exists moral evil, inequality, cruelty and suffering in the world; and the 11th century theodicy discussion by Ramanuja in Sribhasya.

Many Indian religions place greater emphasis on developing the karma principle for first cause and innate justice with Man as focus, rather than developing religious principles with the nature and powers of God and divine judgment as focus. Karma theory of Buddhism, Hinduism and Jainism is not static, but dynamic wherein livings beings with intent or without intent, but with words and actions continuously create new karma, and it is this that they believe to be in part the source of good or evil in the world. These religions also believe that past lives or past actions in current life create current circumstances, which also contributes to either. Other scholars suggest that nontheistic Indian religious traditions do not assume an omnibenevolent creator, and some theistic schools do not define or characterize their God(s) as monotheistic Western religions do and the deities have colorful, complex personalities; the Indian deities are personal and cosmic facilitators, and in some schools conceptualized like Plato’s Demiurge. Therefore, the problem of theodicy in many schools of major Indian religions is not significant, or at least is of a different nature than in Western religions.

== Dvaita tradition of Vaishnavism ==
One sub-tradition within the Vaishnavism school of Hinduism that is an exception is dualistic Dvaita, founded by Madhvacharya in the 13th-century. Madhvacharya was challenged by Hindu scholars on the problem of evil, given his dualistic Dvaita Vedanta (Tattvavada) theory that proposed God (Vishnu, supreme soul) and the individual souls (jīvātman) exist as independent realities, and these are distinct. Madhvacharya asserted, Yathecchasi tatha kuru, which Sharma translates and explains as "one has the right to choose between right and wrong, a choice each individual makes out of his own responsibility and his own risk". According to Sharma, "Madhva's tripartite classification of souls makes it unnecessary to answer the problem of evil".

== See also ==
- Karma
