= Damnation =

Concept of divine punishment

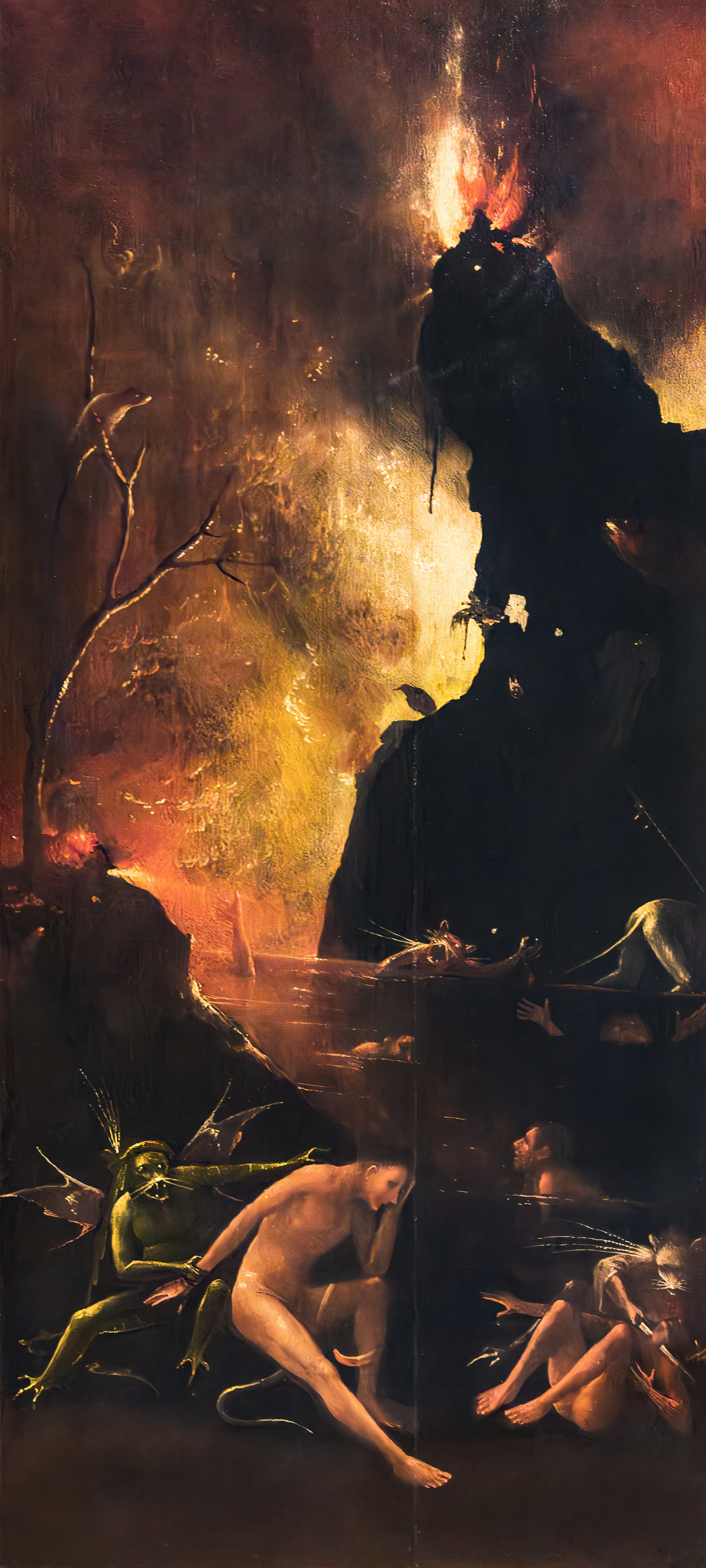
Hieronymus Bosch: Visions of the Hereafter (detail); depicting hell (between 1490 and 1516)

Damnation (from Latin damnatio) is the concept of divine punishment after death for sins on Earth.

In Ancient Egyptian religious tradition, it was believed that citizens would recite the 42 negative confessions of Maat as their heart was weighed against the feather of truth. If the citizen's heart was heavier than the feather, it was said that it would be devoured by Ammit.

Zoroastrianism developed an eschatological concept of a Last Judgment called Frashokereti where the dead will be raised and the righteous wade through a river of milk while the wicked will be burned in a river of molten metal and fire.

Abrahamic religions such as Christianity have similar concepts of humans facing judgement after death to determine if they will spend eternity in heaven or not. A damned human "in damnation" is said to be either in oblivion, or living in a state wherein they are divorced from Heaven and/or in a state of disgrace from God's favor.

Following the religious meaning, the words damn and goddamn are a common form of religious profanity, in modern times often semantically weakened to the status of interjections.

== Etymology ==
Classical Latin damnum means "damage, cost, expense; penalty, fine", ultimately from a PIE root *dap-. The verb damnare in Roman law acquired a legal meaning of "to pronounce judgement upon".

The word entered Middle English usage from Old French in the early 14th century. The secular meaning survives in English "to condemn" (in a court of law), or "damning criticism". The noun damnation itself is mostly reserved for the religious sense in Modern English, while condemnation remains common in secular usage.

From the 18th century to 1930, the use of damn as an expletive was considered a severe profanity and was mostly avoided in print. The expression "not worth a damn" was recorded in 1802. The use of damn as an adjective, short for damned, was recorded in 1775. Damn Yankee (a Southern US term for "Northerner") dates back to 1812.

== Christianity ==
In many forms of Western Christian belief, damnation is what humanity deserves for its sins. Catholic and many Protestant denominations hold that human sin is the product of the fall of man of Adam and Eve in the Book of Genesis. In some Christian denominations, only the sins that the Ten Commandments describe cause damnation, but others apply more strict terms. The reasons for being damned have varied widely through the centuries, with little consistency between different forms of Christianity (i.e., Catholic or Protestant). "Sins" ranging from murder to dancing have been said to lead to damnation.

Christian denominations have differing views on soteriology, but a mainstream view is that believers can only escape damnation by salvation through Jesus Christ. One conception is of suffering and denial of entrance to Heaven, often described as a Lake of Fire. Another conception, derived from the scripture about Gehenna, is simply that people will be discarded, due to being unworthy of preservation by God.

Opinions in the Eastern Orthodox church differ on this subject matter. Question 383 of the Philaret Drozdov catechism asks: "What will be the lot of unbelievers and transgressors? Answer: They will be given over to everlasting death – that is, to everlasting fire, to everlasting torment, with the devils."

However some view sin in less legalistic sense, but more as a spiritual illness that needs to be cured and purged. It is seen as a state of opposition to the love of God, a state into which all humans are born but against which Jesus Christ is the Mediator and Redeemer. Eastern traditions have established their views on Paradise and Gehenna from theologians like Isaac of Nineveh and Basil of Caesarea and the Fathers of the Church. According to Orthodoxy, Heaven and Hell are relations to or experiences of God's just and loving presence, with often used analogy being how Sun melts wax and hardens the clay, with different reactions to sunlight depending not on sun but the matter that reacts to it. Similarly, Saints enjoy the loving presence of God, while the damned are enraged by it. In the Eastern Orthodox tradition theologians can describe God by presenting negative descriptions of what God is not, and describe Gehenna in similar ways. Marcion of Sinope was deemed heretical for teaching that the holy figures of the Old Testament were damned to hell while sinners would receive salvation.

== Hinduism ==
In Hinduism, one of the three main acharyas, Acharya Madhva or Madhvacharya differed significantly from traditional Hindu beliefs owing to his concept of eternal damnation. For example, he divides souls into three classes. One class of souls, mukti-yogyas, qualifies for liberation, another, the nitya-samsarins, subject to eternal rebirth or eternal transmigration and a third class, tamo-yogyas, who are condemned to eternal hell (Andhatamas), since their guilt cannot be obliterated according to him. No other Hindu philosopher or school of Hinduism holds such beliefs. In contrast, most Hindus believe in universal salvation, that all souls will eventually obtain moksha, even if after millions of rebirths.

== As profanity ==
Damn is nowadays a mildly profane word for some people in English, although God damn (or Goddamn) may be considered blasphemous by the religiously devout, who regard it as a violation of the commandment against taking God's name in vain. Dang or darn are common euphemisms, specifically minced oaths, for damn. The profanity of damn and its derivatives (e.g. damned, damnation) is effectively limited to cases where the word is not used in its literal meaning, e.g., "The damned dog won't stop barking!" (but the line of Arthur Miller's character John Proctor to his servant, "God damns all liars" uses the word in its literal sense and has not been seen as objectionable). Use of the word or its derivatives in their figurative forms may impact on the ratings of movies and television programmes.

In Indian English, there is an incorrect etymology connecting "I don't give a damn" with the dam, a 16th-century copper coin. Salman Rushdie, in a 1985 essay on the dictionary of Anglo-Indian terms Hobson-Jobson, ends with this: "'Frankly, my dear, I don't give a small copper coin weighing one tolah, eight mashas and seven surkhs, being the fortieth part of a rupee.' Or, to put it more concisely, a dam."

== See also ==
- Imprecations (Bible)
- Jahannam
- Limbo
- Mortal sin
- Perkele
- Problem of Hell
- Sheol
