= Mukti-yogyas =

In Dvaita theology, Mukti-yogyas are a class of souls classified by Shri Madhvacharya as eligible for mukti or moksha. Madhva divides souls into three classes: one class of souls which qualifies for liberation (Mukti-yogyas), another as subject to eternal rebirth or eternal transmigration (Nitya-samsarins), and a third class that is eventually condemned to eternal hell Andhatamisra (Tamo-yogyas).

Mukti-yogyas are Jivas or souls who are receptive to spiritual values, and through repeated embodiments, they evolve into better and better people, and finally through concentrated spiritual discipline and God's grace attain salvation.
