= Tamo-yogyas =

In Dvaita philosophy, Tamo-yogyas are a group of souls, classified by Madhvacharya, which consists of the souls who are damnable. Madhvacharya divides souls into three classes: one class of souls which qualifies for moksha, or liberation (Mukti-yogyas); another as subject to samsara, eternal rebirth or transmigration (Nitya-samsarins); and a third class that is eventually condemned to eternal hellish life in Andhatamisra (Tamo-yogyas).

According to Madhvacharya, Naraka (hell) is temporary for sinners like thieves and drunkards, but not for those who express eternal hatred against God, the Dvaita gurus or the Vedas. Therefore, the eternally damned would consist of the most evil, sadomasochistic living entities, including the demon Kali, who although he carries out the orders of God also enjoys being punished, and who is said to be the most wicked being. They would sink down into Andhatamisra, which would remain independently during every kalpa. Some Dvaitins regard this as an expression of universal kindness, because it would fit in with their nature, comparing it to the neem tree, which prefers bitter minerals for its growth.
