= Naraka in Hinduism =

Hindu equivalent of Hell

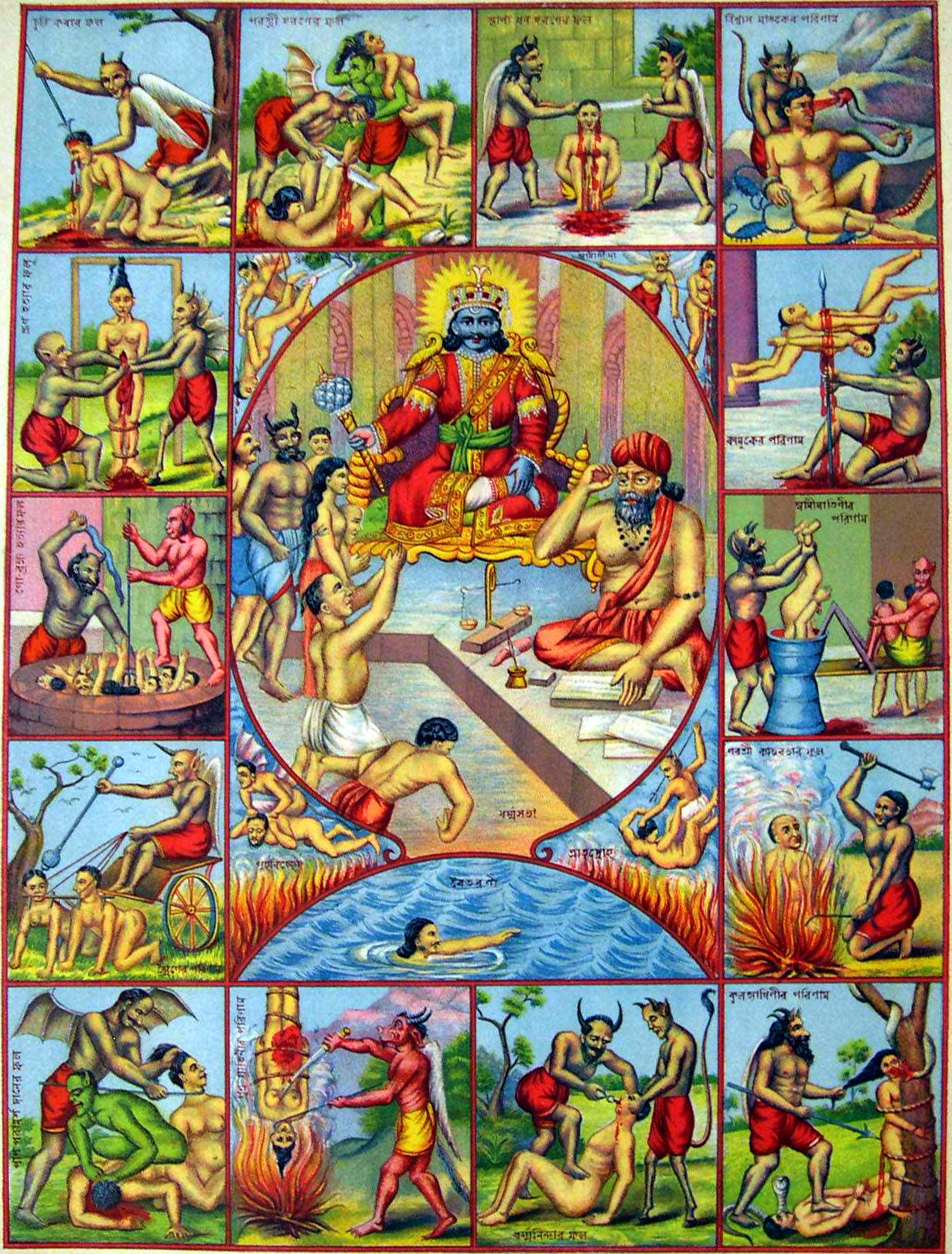
The central panel portrays Yama, aided by Chitragupta and Yamadutas, judging the dead. Other panels depict various realms/hells of Naraka.

Naraka (Sanskrit: नरक), also called Yamaloka, is the Hindu name of Hell, where sinners are tormented after death. It is also the abode of Yama, the god of Death. It is described as located in the south of the universe and beneath the earth.

The number and names of hells, as well as the type of sinners sent to a particular hell, varies from text to text; however, many scriptures describe 28 hells. After death, messengers of Yama called Yamadutas bring all beings to the court of Yama, where he weighs the virtues and the vices of the being and passes a judgement, sending the virtuous to Svarga (heaven) and the sinners to one of the hells. The stay in Svarga or Naraka is generally described as temporary. After the quantum of punishment is over, the souls are reborn as lower or higher beings as per their merits (the exception being Hindu philosopher Madhvacharya, who believes in eternal damnation of the Tamo-yogyas in Andhantamas). In Cambodia, Naraka is part of Hinduism and is also a Khmer word (នរក; norok) for hell.

== Location ==
The Bhagavata Purana describes Naraka as beneath the earth, similar to the western Hell, between the seven realms of the underworld (Patala) and the Garbhodaka Ocean, the lowest, most southerly region of the universe. Pitrloka, the "capital" of Naraka headed by Agniṣvāttā, is where deceased predecessors and relatives (Pitrs) reside, and is also located in this lower region. Yama, Lord of Naraka, resides in this realm with his assistants. The Devi Bhagavata Purana mentions that Naraka is the "southern" part of universe, below the earth but "above" Patala. The Vishnu Purana mentions that it is located below the "cosmic waters at the bottom of the universe". The Hindu epics, too, agree that Naraka is located in the southern universe, a direction which is governed by Yama and is often associated with death, directly. Pitrloka is considered to be the capital city of Naraka and the abode of Yama, to where souls are brought before him to be served their due justice.

== Administration ==
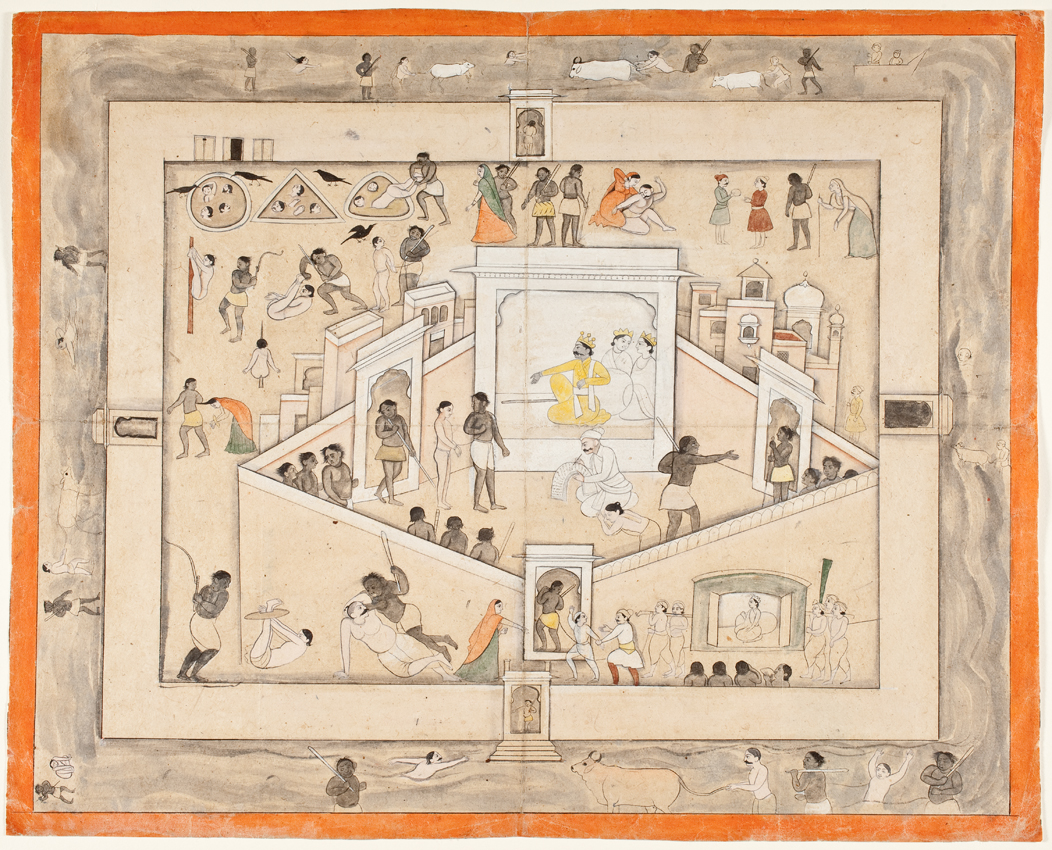
Court of Yama, c. 1800

The god of Death, Yama, employs Yama-dutas (messengers of Yama) or Yama-purushas, who bring souls of all beings to Yama for judgement. Generally, all living beings, including humans and beasts, go to Yama's abode upon death where they are judged. However, very virtuous beings are taken directly to Svarga (paradise). People devoted to charity, especially donors of food, and eternal truth speakers are spared the justice of Yama's court. War-heroes who sacrifice their life and people dying in holy places like Kurukshetra are also described as avoiding Yama. Those who get moksha (salvation) also escape from the clutches of yamadutas. Those who are generous and ascetics are given preferential treatment when entering Naraka for judgement. The way is lighted for those who donated lamps, while those who underwent religious fasting are carried by peacocks and geese.

Yama, as Lord of Justice, is called Dharma-raja. Yama sends the virtuous to Svarga to enjoy the luxuries of paradise. He also assesses the vices of the dead and accords judgement, assigning them to appropriate hells as punishment commensurate with the severity and nature of their sins. A person is not freed of samsara (the cycle of birth-death-rebirth) and must take birth again after his prescribed pleasure in Svarga or punishment in Naraka is over.

Yama is aided by his minister Chitragupta, who maintains a record of all good and evil actions of every living being. Yama-dhutas are also assigned the job of executing the punishments on sinners in the various hells.

== Number and names ==
Naraka, as a whole, is known by many names conveying that it is the realm of Yama. Yamālaya, Yamaloka, Yamasādana and Yamalokāya mean the abode of Yama. Yamakṣaya (the akṣaya of Yama) and its equivalents like Vaivasvatakṣaya use pun for the word kṣaya, which can be mean abode or destruction. It is also called Saṃyamanī, "where only truth is spoken, and the weak torment the strong", Mṛtyulokāya – the world of Death or of the dead and the "city of the king of ghosts", Pretarājapura.

The Agni Purana mentions only four hells. Some texts mention seven hells: Put ("childless", for the childless), Avichi ("waveless", for those waiting for reincarnation), Samhata ("abandoned", for evil beings), Tamisra ("darkness", where darkness of hells begin), Rijisha ("expelled", where torments of hell begin), Kudmala ("leprous", the worst hell for those who are going to be reincarnated) and Kakola ("black poison", the bottomless pit, for those who are eternally condemned to hell and have no chance of reincarnation).

The Manu Smriti mentions 21 hells: Tamisra, Andhatamisra, Maharaurava, Raurava, Kalasutra, Mahanaraka, Samjivana, Mahavichi, Tapana, Sampratapana, Samhata, Sakakola, Kudmala, Putimrittika, Lohasanku, Rijisha, Pathana, Vaitarani, Salmali, Asipatravana and Lohadaraka.

The Yajnavalkya Smriti also lists 21: Tamisra, Lohasanku, Mahaniraya, Salamali, Raurava, Kudmala, Putimrittika, Kalasutraka, Sanghata, Lohitoda, Savisha, Sampratapana, Mahanaraka, Kakola, Sanjivana, Mahapatha, Avichi, Andhatamisra, Kumbhipaka, Asipatravana and Tapana. The Bhagavata Purana, the Vishnu Purana and the Devi Bhagavata Purana enlist and describe 28 hells; however, they end the description by stating that there are hundreds and thousands of hells. The Bhagavata Purana enumerates the following 28: Tamisra, Andhatamisra, Raurava, Maharaurava, Kumbhipaka, Kalasutra, Asipatravana, Sukaramukha, Andhakupa, Krimibhojana, Samdamsa, Taptasurmi, Vajrakantaka-salmali, Vaitarani, Puyoda, Pranarodha, Visasana, Lalabhaksa, Sarameyadana, Avichi, Ayahpana, Ksharakardama, Raksogana-bhojana, Sulaprota, Dandasuka, Avata-nirodhana, Paryavartana and Suchimukha. The Devi Bhagavata Purana agrees with the Bhagavata Purana in most of names; however, a few names are slightly different. Taptasurmi, Ayahpana, Raksogana-bhojana, Avata-nirodhana, Paryavartana are replaced by Taptamurti, Apahpana, Raksogana-sambhoja, Avatarodha, Paryavartanataka respectively. The Vishnu Purana mentions the 28 in the following order: Raurava, Shukara, Rodha, Tala, Visasana, Mahajwala, Taptakumbha, Lavana, Vimohana, Rudhirandha, Vaitaraní, Krimiśa, Krimibhojana, Asipatravana, Krishna, Lalabhaksa, Dáruńa, Púyaváha, Pápa, Vahnijwála, Adhośiras, Sandansa, Kalasutra, Tamas, Avichi, Śwabhojana, Apratisht́ha, and another Avichi.

== Description of hells ==
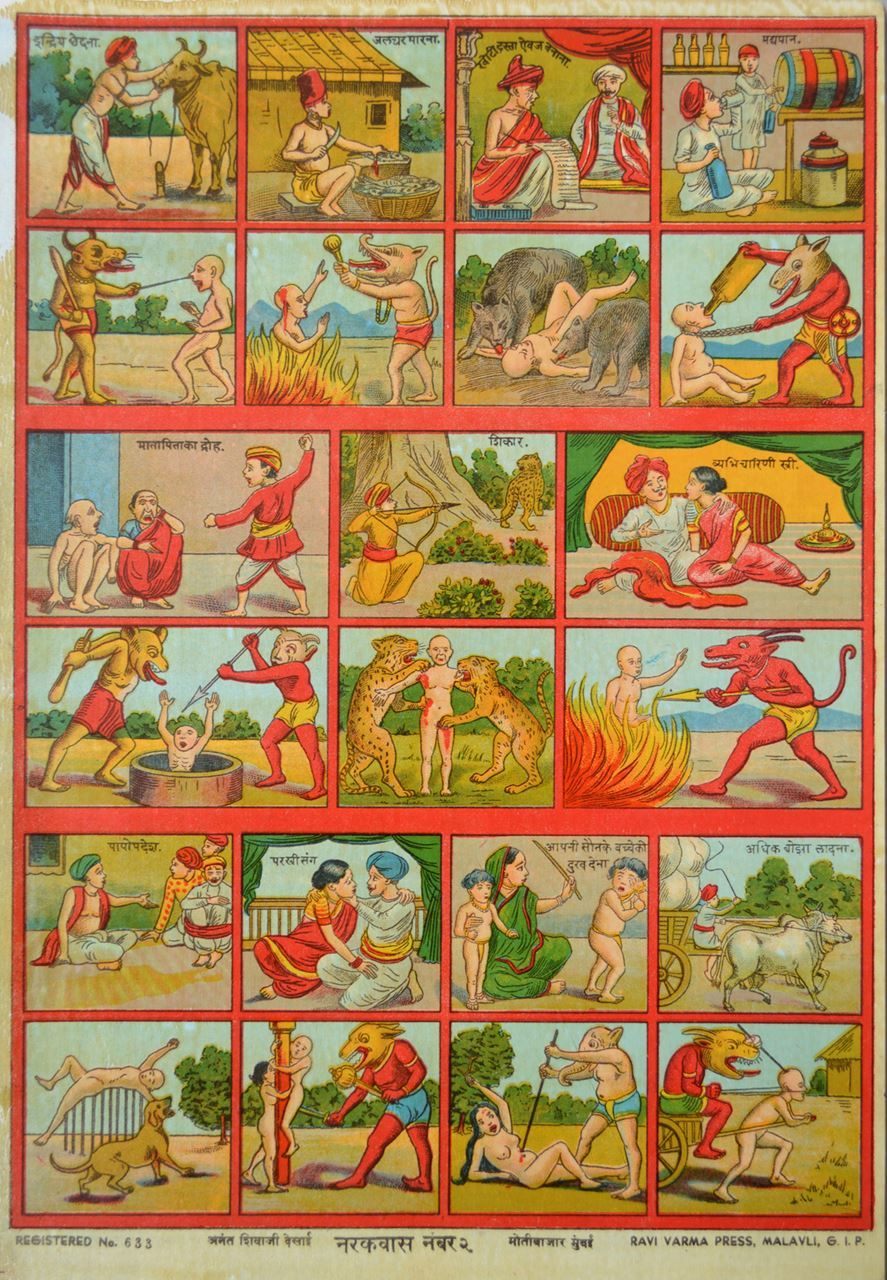
Lithograph of the Ravi Varma Press in Bombay displaying punishments for activities like mutilating animals, killing fishes, forging documents, alcohol consumption, abuse of elderly parents, hunting, adultery (for women), advising to commit sin, adultery (for men), mistreatment the children of co-wives & making draught animals pull excess load in hells.

Early texts like the Rigveda do not have a detailed description of Naraka. It is simply a place of evil and a dark bottomless pit. The Atharvaveda describes a realm of darkness, where murderers are confined after death.

The Shatapatha Brahmana is the first text to mention the pain and suffering of Naraka in detail, while the Manu Smriti begins naming the multiple hells. The epics also describe Hell in general terms as a dense jungle without shade, where there is no water and no rest. The Yamadutas torment souls on the orders of their master.

The names of many of hells is common in Hindu texts; however, the nature of sinners tormented in particular hells varies from text to text.

The summary of twenty-eight hells described in the Bhagavata Purana and the Devi Bhagavata Purana are as follows:

Tamisra (darkness): It is intended for a person who grabs another's wealth, wife or children. In this dark realm, he is bound with ropes and starved without food or water. He is beaten and reproached by Yamadutas till he faints.

Andhatamisra (blind-darkness): Here, a man – who deceives another man and enjoys his wife or children – is tormented to the extent he loses his intelligence and sight. The torture is described as cutting the tree at its roots.

Raurava (fearful or hell of rurus): As per the Bhagavata Purana and the Devi Bhagavata Purana, it is assigned for a person who cares about his own and his family's good, but harms other living beings and is always envious of others. The living beings hurt by such a man take the form of savage serpent-like beasts called rurus and torture this person. The Vishnu Purana deems this hell fit for a false witness or one who lies.

Maharaurava (great-fearful): A person who indulges at the expense of other beings is afflicted with pain by fierce rurus called kravyadas, who eat his flesh.

Kumbhipaka (cooked in a pot): A person who cooks beasts and birds alive is cooked alive in boiling oil by Yamadutas here, for as many years as there were hairs on the bodies of their animal victims.

Kalasutra (thread of Time/Death): The Bhagavata Purana assigns this hell to a murderer of a brahmin, while the Devi Bhagavata Purana allocates it for a person who disrespects his parents, elders, ancestors or brahmins. This realm is made entirely of copper and extremely hot, heated by fire from below and the red hot sun from above. Here, the sinner burns from within by hunger and thirst and the smouldering heat outside, whether he sleeps, sits, stands or runs.

Asipatravana/Asipatrakanana (forest of sword leaves): The Bhagavata Purana and the Devi Bhagavata Purana reserve this hell for a person who digresses from the religious teachings of the Vedas and indulges in heresy. The Vishnu Purana states that wanton tree-felling leads to this hell. Yamadutas beat them with whips as they try to run away in the forest where palm trees have swords as leaves. Afflicted with injury of whips and swords, they faint and cry out for help in vain.

Shukaramukha (hog's mouth): It houses kings or government officials who punish the innocent or grant corporal punishment to a Brahmin. Yamadutas crush him as sugar cane is crushed to extract juice. He will yell and scream in agony, just as the guiltless suffered.

Andhakupa (well with its mouth hidden): It is the hell where a person who harms others with the intention of malice and harms insects is confined. He is attacked by birds, mammals, reptiles, mosquitoes, lice, worms, flies and others, who deprive him of rest and compel him to run hither and thither.

Krimibhojana/Krimibhaksha (worm-food): As per the Bhagavata Purana and the Devi Bhagavata Purana, it is where a person who does not share his food with guests, elders, children or the gods, and selfishly eats it alone, and he who eats without performing the five yajnas (panchayajna) is chastised. The Vishnu Purana states that one who loathes his father, Brahmins or the gods and who destroys jewels is punished here. This hell is a 100,000 yojana lake filled with worms. The sinful person is reduced to a worm, who feeds on other worms, who in turn devour his body for 100,000 years.

Sandansa/Sandamsa (hell of pincers): The Bhagavata Purana and the Devi Bhagavata Purana state that a person who robs a Brahmin or steals jewels or gold from someone, when not in dire need, is confined to this hell. However, the Vishnu Purana tells the violators of vows or rules endure pain here. His body is torn by red-hot iron balls and tongs.

Taptasurmi/Taptamurti (red-hot iron statue): A man or woman who indulges in illicit sexual relations with a woman or man is beaten by whips and forced to embrace red-hot iron figurines of the opposite sex.

Vajrakantaka-salmali (the silk-cotton tree with thorns like thunderbolts/vajras): A person who has sexual intercourse with non-humans or who has excessive coitus is tied to the Vajrakantaka-salmali tree and pulled by Yamadutas so that the thorns tear his body.

Vaitarni/Vaitarna (to be crossed): It is a river that is believed to lie between Naraka and the earth. This river, which forms the boundary of Naraka, is filled with excreta, urine, pus, blood, hair, nails, bones, marrow, flesh and fat, where fierce aquatic beings eat the person's flesh. As per the Bhagavata Purana and the Devi Bhagavata Purana, a person born in a respectable family – kshatriya (warrior-caste), royal family or government official – who neglects his duty is thrown into this river of hell. The Vishnu Purana assigns it to the destroyer of a bee-hive or a town.

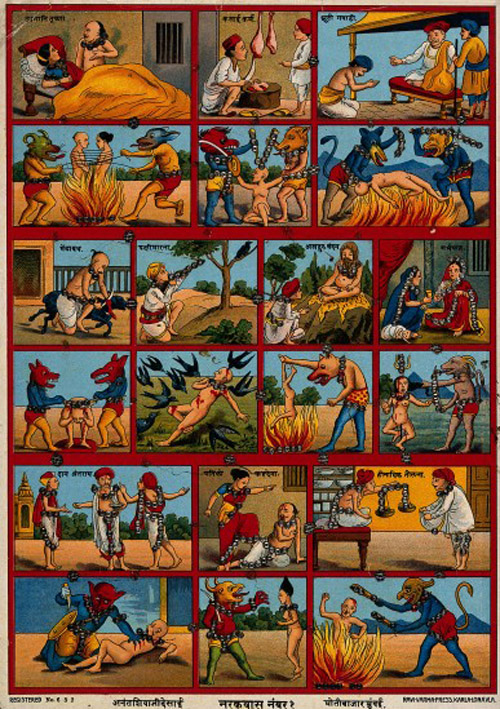
Various sins and corresponding punishments in hells

Puyoda (water of pus): Shudras (workmen-caste) and husbands or sexual partners of lowly women and prostitutes – who live like beasts devoid of cleanliness and good behaviour – fall in Puyoda, the ocean of pus, excreta, urine, mucus, saliva and other repugnant things. Here, they are forced to eat these disgusting things.

Pranarodha (obstruction to life): Some Brahmins, Kshatriyas and Vaishyas (merchant caste) indulge in the sport of hunting with their dogs and donkeys in the forest, resulting in wanton killing of beasts. Yamadutas play archery sport with them as the targets in this hell.

Visashana (murderous): The Bhagavata Purana and the Devi Bhagavata Purana mention that Yamadutas whip a person who has pride of his rank and wealth and sacrifices beasts as a status symbol, and finally kill him. The Vishnu Purana associates it with the maker of spears, swords, and other weapons.

Lalabhaksa (saliva as food): As per the Bhagavata Purana and the Devi Bhagavata Purana, a Brahmin, a Kshatriya or a Vaishya husband, who forces his wife to drink his semen out of lust and to enforce his control, is thrown in a river of semen, which he is forced to drink. The Vishnu Purana disagrees stating that one who eats before offering food to the gods, the ancestors or guests is brought to this hell.

Sarameyadana (hell of the sons of Sarama): Plunderers who burn houses and poison people for wealth, and kings and other government officials who grab money of merchants, mass murder or ruin the nation, are cast into this hell. Seven hundred and twenty ferocious dogs, the sons of Sarama, with razor-sharp teeth, prey on them at the behest of Yamadutas.

Avici/Avicimat (waterless/waveless): A person, who lies on oath or in business, is repeatedly thrown head-first from a 100 yojana high mountain whose sides are stone waves, but without water. His body is continuously broken, but it is made sure that he does not die.

Ayahpana (iron-drink): Anybody else under oath or a Brahmin who drinks alcohol is punished here. Yamadutas stand on their chests and force them to drink molten-iron.

Ksarakardama (acidic/saline mud/filth): One who in false pride, does not honour a person higher than him by birth, austerity, knowledge, behaviour, caste or spiritual order, is tortured in this hell. Yamadutas throw him head-first and torment him.

Raksogana-bhojana (food of Rakshasas): Those who practise human-sacrifice and cannibalism are condemned to this hell. Their victims, in the form of Rakshasas, cut them with sharp knives and swords. The Rakshasas feast on their blood and sing and dance in joy, just as the sinners slaughtered their victims.

Shulaprota (pierced by sharp pointed spear/dart): Some people give shelter to birds or animals pretending to be their saviours, but then harass them poking with threads, needles or using them like lifeless toys. Also, some people behave the same way to humans, winning their confidence and then killing them with sharp tridents or lances. The bodies of such sinners, fatigued with hunger and thirst, are pierced with sharp, needle-like spears. Ferocious carnivorous birds like vultures and herons tear and gorge their flesh.

Dandasuka (snakes): Filled with envy and fury, some people harm others like snakes. These are destined to be devoured by five or seven hooded serpents in this hell.

Avata-nirodhana (confined in a hole): People who imprison others in dark wells, crannies or mountain caves are pushed into this hell, a dark well engulfed with poisonous fumes and smoke that suffocates them.

Paryavartana (returning): A householder who welcomes guests with cruel glances and abuses them is restrained in this hell. Hard-eyed vultures, herons, crows and similar birds gaze on him and suddenly fly and pluck his eyes.

Sucimukha (needle-face): An ever-suspicious man is always wary of people trying to grab his wealth. Proud of his money, he sins to gain and to retain it. Yamadutas stitch thread through his whole body in this hell.

Though the Vishnu Purana mentions 28 hells, it gives information only about sinners condemned in 21 hells and does not give details about the punishments. The hells described in the Vishnu Purana, but not in the Bhagavata Purana and the Devi Bhagavata Purana are as follows:

Rodha (obstruction): A causer of abortion, a murderer of a cow, a plunderer or one who strangles a man is cast here.

Sukara (hog): A murderer of a Brahmin, a stealer of gold or an alcoholic and those all associated with them fall into this hell.

Tala (padlock): Murder of a Kshatriya or a Vaishya and adultery with wife of a religious leader leads here.

Taptakumbha (hot pots): Incest with sister and murder of an ambassador results in torment in this hell.

Taptaloha (hot iron): A wife-seller, a jailer and one who abandons his followers is tortured here.

Mahajwala (great-fire): Incest with daughter or daughter-in-law brings one here.

Lavana (salt): One who vilifies his guru, people superior to them or the Vedas go to this hell.

Vimohana (the place of bewildering): A thief or those who despise prescribed observances are tormented here.

Krimisha (hell of insects): One who uses magic to harm others is condemned here.

Vedhaka (piercing): The maker of arrows is damned to this hell.

Adhomukha (head-inverted): He who takes bribes, an astrologer and he who worships improper objects is cast here.

Púyaváha (where matter falls): A Brahmin who sells lac, meat, alcohol, salt; he who commits violence and he who eats sweets without sharing falls in this hell.

Rudhirándha (wells of blood): Wrestlers or boxers who commit violence for entertainment, fishermen, followers of bastards, arsonists, poisoners, informants, fortune-tellers, traitors, those who have coitus on sacred taboo days and those who live off their wives' prostitution are cast here.

Krishna (dark/black): A fraudster, a trespasser and one who causes impotence is cast into this hell.

Vahnijwala (fiery flame): Potters, hunters and shepherds and others are punished here.

Shwabhojana (food of dogs): A religious student who sleeps in the day and one who does not have spiritual knowledge and learns it from children are damned here.

== Narrative, social and economic functions ==
The Hindu religion regards Hell not as a place of lasting permanence, but as an alternate domain from which an individual can return to the present world after crimes in the previous life have been compensated for. These crimes are eventually nullified through an equal punishment in the next life. The concept of Hell has provided many different opportunities for the Hindu religion including narrative, social and economic functions.

=== Narrative ===
A narrative rationale for the concept of Hell can be found in the Hindu epic Mahabharata. This narrative ends with Yudhishthira's visit to hell after being offered acceptance into heaven. This journey creates a scene for the audience that helps illustrate the importance of understanding hell as well as heaven before accepting either extreme. This idea provides an essential lesson regarding Dharma, a primary theme within the Mahabharata. Dharma is not a black and white concept, and all people are not entirely good or entirely evil. As such, tolerance is essential in order to truly understand the "right way of living". We all must understand the worst to truly understand and appreciate the best just as we must experience the best before we can experience the worst. This narrative utilizes the Hindu religion in order to teach lessons on tolerance and acceptance of one another's faults as well as virtues.

=== Social ===
A social rationale for the Hindu concept of rebirth in Hell is evident in the metric work of the Manusmrti: a written discourse focused on the "law of the social classes". A large portion of it is designed to help people of the Hindu faith understand evil deeds (pātaka) and their karmic consequences in various hellish rebirths. The Manusmrti, however, does not go into explicit detail of each hell. For this we turn to the Bhagavata Purana. The Manusmrti lists multiple levels of hell into which a person can be reborn. The punishments in each of these consecutive hells is directly related to the crimes (pātaka) of the current life and how these deeds will affect the next reincarnation during the cycle of Saṃsāra. This concept provides structure to society in which crimes have exacting consequences. An opposite social facet to these hellish rebirths is the precise way in which a person can redeem himself/herself from a particular crime through a series of vows (such as fasting, water purification rituals, chanting, and even sacrifices). These vows must take place during the same life cycle that the crimes were committed in. These religious lessons assist the societal structure by defining approved and unapproved social behavior.

=== Economic ===
The last Hindu function for Hell-based reincarnations is the text Preta khanda in the Garuda Purana used by Hindu priests during Śrāddha rituals. During these rituals, the soul of a dying or deceased individual is given safe passage into the next life. This ritual is directly related to the economic prosperity of Hindu priests and their ability to save the dying soul from a hellish reincarnation through gifts given on behalf of the deceased to the priest performing the ritual. With each gift given, crimes committed during the deceased's life are forgiven and the next life is progressively improved.
