= Anu Vyakhyana =

Sanskrit work on Dvaita philosophy

- Author: Madhvacharya
- Language: Sanskrit
- Subject: Hindu philosophy
- Genre: Tattvavada (Dvaita Vedanta)
- Publication place: India

The Aṇuvyākhyāna is a Sanskrit work regarding Dvaita philosophy written by Madhvacharya. It is a metacommentary on the author's own commentary on the Brahma Sutras. The other three works on Sutras are Brahma Sutra Bhashya, Anu Bhashya, and Nyayavivarana. The Anuvyakyana is a work elucidating this commentary with scholarly and philosophical dissertations and criticisms of other schools especially the Advaita of Adi Shankara and the Vishistadvaita of Ramanuja.

== Mentions and Commentaries ==
=== Commentaries ===
- Sanyayaratnavali by Padmanabha Tirtha
- NAYA-CHANDRIKA by Narayana-panditacharya
- Nyāya Sudhā, a magnum opus of Jayatirtha

== Bibliography ==
- Sharma, B. N. Krishnamurti (2000). A History of the Dvaita School of Vedānta and Its Literature, Vol 1. 3rd Edition. Motilal Banarsidass (2008 Reprint). ISBN 978-8120815759.
