= Bidarahalli =

- Village
- Location in Karnataka, India
- Coordinates: 15.014°N 75.791°E
- Country: India
- State: Karnataka
- District: Gadag
- Taluka: Mundargi

Languages
  - Official: Kannada
- Time zone: UTC+5:30 (IST)
- Pin: 582118

Bidarahalli is a village located in Mundargi taluk in Gadag district, Karnataka, India.
