= Nitya-samsarins =

Eternally transmigrating self in Hindu philosophy

Nitya-samsarins (Sanskrit: नित्यसंसारिन्, romanized: nityasaṃsārin) or nitya-samsaris is a concept in Hindu philosophy, referring to an individual who believes that their self is eternally bound in the cycle of rebirth called samsara. The existence of nitya-samsari is used to offer credibility to the concept of the periodical creation and the dissolution of the universe.

== Philosophy ==
=== Dvaita ===
The philosopher Madhva divides souls into three classes: one class of souls that qualifies for moksha (mukti-yogyas), another as subject to samsara (nitya-samsaris), and a third class that is eventually condemned to the hell named Andhatamisra (tamo-yogyas).

=== Vishishtadvaita ===
In the philosophy of Vishishtadvaita, a nitya-samsari is an individual who is described to be bound to their karma at all times.
