= Dvaita Vedanta =

School of thought in Hinduism

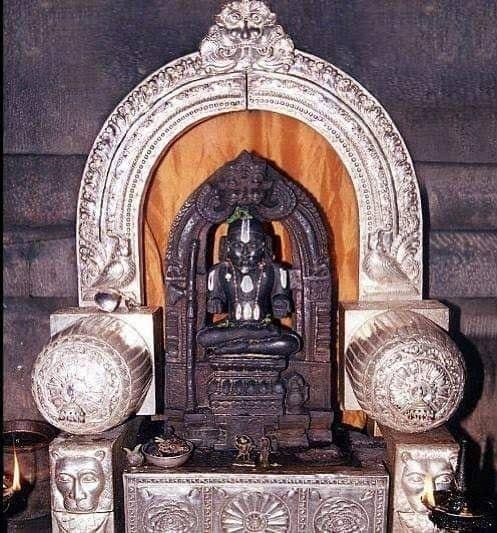
Madhvacharya, who propounded the philosophy of Tattvavada

Dvaita Vedanta (/ˈdvaɪtə veɪˈdɑːntə/, originally known as Tattvavada; IAST: Tattvavāda), is a sub-school in the Vedanta tradition of Hindu philosophy. The term Tattvavada literally means "arguments from a realist viewpoint". The Tattvavada (Dvaita) Vedanta sub-school was founded by the 13th-century Indian philosopher-saint Madhvacharya. Madhvacharya believed in two entities: God, jiva (soul), and jada (maya, matter). The Dvaita Vedanta believes that God and the individual souls (jīvātman) exist as distinct realities. These individual souls are dependent (paratantra) on Vishnu (Narayana), who alone is independent (svatantra).

The Dvaita school contrasts with the other two major sub-schools of Vedanta, the Advaita Vedanta of Adi Shankara which posits nondualism—that ultimate reality (Brahman) and human soul (Ātman) are identical and all reality is interconnected oneness, and Vishishtadvaita of Ramanuja which posits qualified nondualism—that ultimate reality (Brahman) and human soul are different but with the potential to be identical. Sanyasis of the Dvaita Vedanta tradition belong to the ēkadaṇḍi order.

== Etymology ==
Dvaita (द्वैत) is a Sanskrit word that means "duality, dualism". The term refers to any premise, particularly in theology on the material and the divine, where two principles (truths) or realities are posited to exist simultaneously and independently. While dualism generally entails a division between good and evil, Madhvacharya classifies reality into two based on independence and dependence:

- independent entity: Creator Benefactor and Destroyer of the Universe which is One
- the dependent reality: all else is dependent on Him

=== Other names ===
==== Svatantra-Advitiya-Brahmavāda ====
Indologist B. N. Krishnamurti Sharma says: "The English term Dualism is inadequate to express the full content and depth of meaning that Madhva has put into the term Dvaita, as it is to be implied to his system. Even the Sanskrit word Dvaita is not literally capable of expressing more than the fundamental principles accepted." B. N. K. Sharma suggested the term Svatantra-Advitiya-Brahmavāda as an alternative name for Madhva's system, explaining that it emphasizes both the transcendence and immanence of Brahman, directly conveying what Madhva and his commentators like Jayatirtha often stress: the unique supremacy of God (the infinite) alongside the dependent reality of souls and matter (the finite). Sharma says, Satyadhyana Tirtha of Uttaradi Math approved this terminology and would be terminologically balanced with other Vēdantic systems like Nirviśeṣādvaita, Śuddhādvaita, and Viśiṣṭādvaita.

Quoting the term Advitīyatva, Sharma notes that Madhva, in his Chandogya Bhashya, interprets it as denoting the "absence of peer and superior" to Brahman. This interpretation implicitly affirms the existence of "lesser reals", individual souls and matters, subordinate to God's sovereignty. Sharma further states that verses like "नेह नानास्ति किंचना are understood as negating some internal distinctions (nānātva) in Brahman. The only internal distinctions that are logically conceivable in Brahman, are those of attributes. The adjunct Svatantra would thus serve to emphasize the transcendence of the supreme over the other reals and its immanence in them and show how the conception of Brahman, here, differs from the Nirviśeṣādvaita of Adi Shankara. It would also lay direct emphasis on the primacy of the supreme as the Para-Siddhanta of the Madhva's thought, and put the teachings about the finite in their proper place as constituting the Apara-Siddhānta (subsidiary truths)".

==== Pūrnabrahmavāda ====
Aluru Venkata Rao opines that the term Dvaita is not suitable for Madhva's philosophy, hence it should not be used. Instead, he suggests to use the term Pūrnabrahmavāda.

== Philosophy ==
Dvaita Vedanta is a dualistic interpretation of the Vedas systematized by the 13th-century Indian philosopher-saint Madhvacharya, theorizing the existence of two separate realities. The first and the only independent reality (svatantra-tattva), is Vishnu as the ultimate reality (Brahman) and Supreme God. Vishnu is the supreme Self, in a manner similar to the monotheistic God in other major religions. He is believed to be almighty, eternal, always existing, everlasting, all-knowing, and compassionate. The second reality is that of dependent (asvatantra-tattva or paratantra) but equally real universe that exists with its own separate essence. Everything that is composed of the second reality, such as individual soul, matter, and the like exist with their own separate reality. The distinguishing factor of this philosophy, as opposed to monistic Advaita Vedanta, is that God takes on a personal role and is seen as a real eternal entity that governs and controls the universe.

Like Ramanuja, for Madhvacharya too, Vishnu is the One Independent Supreme principle. But this is not sectarian; For Madhva, words like "Narayana", "Vishnu", etc, when etymologically derived, give the meaning of transcendence, immanence, abode of infinite auspicious attributes, infinite bliss, etc. Madhvacharya posits God as being personal and saguna, that is endowed with attributes and qualities (in human terms, which are not believed to be able to fully describe God). To Madhvacharya, the metaphysical concept of Brahman in the Vedas was Vishnu. He stated: "Brahmaśabdaśca Viṣṇaveva", that Brahman can only refer to Vishnu. Scriptures which say different are declared as non-authoritative by him. For Madhvacharya, Vishnu was not just any other deva, but rather the one and only Supreme Being. According to him, the devas are souls of deceased persons who were rewarded for good deeds by being reincarnated into the heavenly worlds and carrying out the will of God, which would also be the case with Vayu and Lakshmi. He also believes that devas are mortal, and that some of them could sink into lower stages of existence after death. Therefore, he believes that only God (Vishnu) should be worshipped through devas, and that worshipping devas on their own behalf is an apostasy which emerged during Treta Yuga, and did not yet exist during Satya Yuga. According to him, this must also be noticed regarding murtis.

The Reals

This system admits of a two-fold classification of "Reals"—into the Independent and Dependent reality; the Independent Reality is One, and is Vishnu. The dependent reality comprises all else—the jivas, the jadas and also the abhava padarthas.

The Brahman

Brahman is Vishnu, He is Supreme, abode of auspicious attributes, free from blemishes, and Infinite in every sense of the term. There is no gradation of Brahman into Saguna and Nirguna; Nirguna is understood as being free from all kinds of imperfections and is itself a guna (attribute) of the Supreme.

=== Jivas ===
The jivas are eternal and infinite in number. Therefore, for the jivas, Creation is the obtainment of visheshas—the bodies in successive births.

The individual souls (jiva) are depicted as reflections, images or shadows of the divine (bimba-pratibimba), but never in any way (even after moksha, or liberation) identical with the divine. Being a reflection of God, each jiva has a nature with some characteristics (truth, conscious, bliss) of God in varying degree which is under the influence of karma in bondage and expands to its distinct full intrinsic capacity in moksha. Liberated jivas do not attain equality with Brahman and also are not equal to each other. Jivas are qualitatively different from each other and have an intrinsic svabhava—nature that impels them into karma, good or evil.

Jadas

The jadas are the other dependent reality is subject to the cycle of creation and dissolution.

Five fundamental, eternal and real differences are described in Dvaita school:

1. Between the individual souls (or jīvātman) and God (paramathma or Vishnu).
2. Between matter (inanimate, insentient) and God.
3. Between individual souls (jīvātman).
4. Between matter and jīvātman.
5. Between various types of matter.

The theory of five differences is that "the jiva is different from every other entity including all jivas". These five differences are said to explain the nature of the universe. The world is called prapañca (pañca "five") by the Dvaita school for this reason.

Madhva differed significantly from traditional Hindu beliefs owing to his concept of eternal damnation. According to him, there are three different classes of souls: One class, Mukti-yogyas, which would qualify for liberation, another, the Nitya-samsarins, which would be subject to eternal rebirth or eternal transmigration and a third class, Tamo-yogyas, which would be condemned to eternal hell (Andhatamisra).

=== Moksha (liberation) ===
Moksha (liberation) is described as the realization that all finite reality is essentially dependent on the Supreme. God is believed to have shown the way to attain moksha through several avatars. Bhakti Yoga is an essential part of Dvaita Vedanta. By devotion to God and God's grace, jiva attains moksha. Moksha is the expression and manifestation of the innate bliss in the soul that has been all along covered by ajnana and bondage. While Divine Grace is a must for this, Mukti is not possible without jnana (Jnanenaiva paramam padam—Sri Madhvacharya in Anubhashya, a small metric composition on the Brahmasutras). However, the concept of jnana differs significantly from that of other schools; Jnana may be described as a direct knowledge and vision (aparokshajnana) of the indwelling form of the Lord through study of scriptures, righteous living spanning births and devotion to the Lord with full understanding of his transcendental attributes. However, bad karma results in condemnation from God.

Sadhana and Liberation

According to Madhvacharya, the jiva is unaware of its real nature due to ignorance (avidyā) caused by maya, and thus, is unable to realize its expression of intrinsic attributes. Some jivas are predestined to attain moksha, while others are predestined to eternally suffer. While this may seem cruel, it is actually a corollary of the three-fold classification of the svabhava or the intrinsic nature of the jivas.

Liberation for each jiva means realizing its innate bliss by removal of covering of maya. Liberation can only be achieved by the grace of God with self-effort on the part of the jiva. Practicing vairāgya allows Mukti-yogyas (jivas qualified for liberation) to gain freedom from worldly attachments and develop faith in God. Self-effort which makes a jiva worthy for liberation involves karma (good work), Jnana Yoga (knowledge) and Bhakti Yoga (devotion). Sādhaka performs such sadhana through śravaṇa, manana and nididhyasana. Madhva also placed a great importance on a Guru's guidance and blessings to understand the jnana from scriptures. According to Madhva, śravaṇa and manana are the only means for nidhiyasana. This sadhana leads the sadhaka to aparoksa-jnana (spiritual realisation) and liberation through grace of God.

Thus the path to liberation consists of: Jnana, bhakti, jnana and bhakti again.

1. righteous living
2. study of shastras and obtaining indirect knowledge of God, reflection and meditation on His infinite auspicious attributes and as benefactor of all of the Universe
3. Love of God( paroksha jnana and bhakti)
4. Direct vision of God (aparokshajnana) that cuts all karma except prarabhdha
5. sadhana continues and at the end of the Brahma-kalpa, shedding of all coils including the last—the linga deha and entering Vaikunta.

== Relationship with other traditions ==
=== Advaita ===
Dvaita philosophers challenge the Advaita Vedanta view that ignorance (avidya) explains the appearance of multiplicity in a singular, unchanging reality (Brahman). Madhva offers multiple counterarguments:

1. How is liberation possible if both the universe and ignorance are mere illusions connected to Brahman.
2. There is no similarity between Brahman and the cosmos to justify such an illusion.
3. If individuality is a misconception, but individuals have ignorance, ignorance must belong to Brahman, too. And if ignorance is a part of Brahman, and Brahman is real, ignorance is real, contradicting the foundational goal of liberation in Advaita philosophy.

=== Vishishtadvaita ===
The Dvaita school also differs from Vishishtadvaita of Ramanuja. Vishishtadvaita maintains that ultimate reality and the soul are different but with the potential to become identical, proposing a qualified non-dualism where souls and matter are real parts of Brahman. Dvaita rejects this as an insufficient distinction, insisting on a complete and eternal separation between God, souls, and matter. Madhva accepted Ramanuja's affirmation of a real world and a personal God, but rejected his qualified non-dualism as an inconsistent middle ground.

=== Shuddhadvaita ===
Vallabhacharya's Shuddhadvaita (pure non-dualism) shares with Dvaita a strong devotional orientation and acceptance of the reality of the world. Vallabha maintains that Krishna is the absolute Brahman and the world is a real manifestation of his nature i.e sat, chit, ananda. Dvaita Vedanta rejects this as an undue identification of the material world with the divine, insisting on the ontological distinction between creator and creation.

== Influence ==
- Dvaita Vedanta and Madhvacharya's historical influence in Hinduism, state Kulandran and Kraemer, has been salutary, but not extensive.
- According to Sharma, the influence of Dvaita Vedanta ideas have been most prominent on the Chaitanya school of Bengal Vaishnavism, and in Assam.
- Madhva's theology influenced later scholars such as Nimbarka, Vallabha, and Chaitanya Mahaprabhu. B.N.K. Sharma notes that Nimbarka's theology is a loose réchauffé of Madhva's in its most essential aspects.

== See also ==
- Madhvacharya
- Madhwa Brahmins
- Dvaita literature
- Madhva Vaishnavas
