= Vismaya Mohanlal =

Indian actress (born 1994)

- Born: 27 March 1994 (age 32); Thiruvananthapuram, Kerala, India
- Education: Theatre & Art
- Occupations: Author, Poet, Actress
- Years active: 2021–present
- Parents: Mohanlal (father); Suchitra Mohanlal (mother)
- Relatives: Pranav Mohanlal (Brother); Suresh Balaje (uncle); K. Balaji (grandfather)
- Family: Mohanlal-Balaji family

Vismaya Mohanlal is an Indian author, poet, and actress who works in Malayalam cinema. The daughter of actor Mohanlal and Suchitra, she first gained recognition as a writer with her 2021 poetry and art collection, Grains of Stardust. She made her acting debut in a lead role with the 2026 Malayalam action thriller Thudakkam.

== Early life and education ==
Vismaya was born on 27 March 1994 in Thiruvananthapuram, Kerala, India. Her maternal grandfather was Tamil film producer K. Balaji. She completed her schooling in Ooty and later studied theatre in London, the United States, and Prague. She has also trained in Muay Thai in Thailand.

== Literary work ==
In February 2021, Vismaya made her debut as an author with the publication of Grains of Stardust, released by Penguin Random House India. The 128-page book is a collection of her English poems paired with her original paintings and illustrations.The book received coverage in Indian media, including comments from actor Amitabh Bachchan.

== Film career ==
Before stepping in front of the camera, Vismaya worked behind the scenes as an assistant director on her father's 2024 3D fantasy film Barroz. She made her feature film acting debut in August 2026 with the Malayalam action thriller Thudakkam, directed by Jude Anthany Joseph and produced by Aashirvad Cinemas. Playing the lead character Meenu, she starred alongside Saikumar, Manoj K. Jayan, Ganesh Kumar, and Mohanlal, who appeared in a cameo role.

== Filmography ==
=== Actress ===
Key
†	Denotes films that have not yet been released

List of Vismaya Mohanlal film credits
Year	Title	Role	Notes	Ref.
2026	Thudakkam	Meenu	Acting Debut	
2027	VS02 †	TBA	Announced	

=== As assistant director ===
Year	Title	Director	Ref.
2024	Barroz 3D	Mohanlal	
