= List of South Indian film families =

South Indian cinema, is the segment of Indian cinema. It refers to the cinema of the four major film industries in South India; primarily engaged in making feature films in the four major languages of the region, namely — Telugu, Tamil, Kannada and Malayalam. They are often colloquially referred to as Tollywood, Kollywood, Sandalwood and Mollywood, respectively.

This article lists notable families in the South Indian cinema, who have been involved in a variety of professions related to the film rather than South Indian films, see List of Hindi film families.

== A ==
=== Adivi family ===
- Adivi Sesh, Actor, Screenwriter, Director; Grandson of Adivi Gangaraju
- Sai Kiran Adivi, Director; cousin to Adivi Sesh
- Adivi Baapiraju cousin to Adivi Sesh's grandfather

=== Agathian family ===
- Agathian, director.
- Kani Thiru, television personality; daughter of Agathian.
  - Thiru, director; husband of Kani
- Vijayalakshmi Ahathian, actress and television personality; daughter of Agathian.
  - Feroz Mohammed, director; husband of Vijayalakshmi.
- Niranjani Ahathian, actress and costume designer; daughter of Agathian.
  - Desingh Periyasamy, director; husband of Niranjani.

=== Ajith Kumar family ===
- Ajith Kumar, actor.
  - Shiva, actor; husband of Ajith's cousin, Priya.
- Shalini, former actress; wife of Ajith Kumar.
  - Shamlee, actress; sister of Shalini.
  - Richard Rishi, actor; brother of Shalini.

=== Akkineni and Daggubati family ===
The Akkineni–Daggubati family is a prominent film family with a long history in Telugu cinema. Akkineni Nageswara Rao and influential movie Mogul D. Ramanaidu are the prominent heads of both families.

- Akkineni Nageswara Rao
  - Nagarjuna (younger son of ANR)
    - Naga Chaitanya (son of Nagarjuna and Daggubati Lakshmi)
  - Amala (second wife of Nagarjuna)
    - Akhil Akkineni (son of Nagarjuna and Amala)
    - Sumanth (nephew of Nagarjuna)
    - Sushanth (nephew of Nagarjuna)
    - A. V. Subba Rao (paternal grandfather of Sushanth, Noted Film Producer)
- D. Ramanaidu (producer, former MP, father of Venkatesh and grandfather of Rana Daggubati)
  - D. Suresh Babu (producer, elder son of Ramanaidu and father of Rana Daggubati)
    - Rana Daggubati (actor and grandson of Ramanaidu)
  - Venkatesh (actor, younger son of Ramanaidu and uncle of Rana Daggubati)
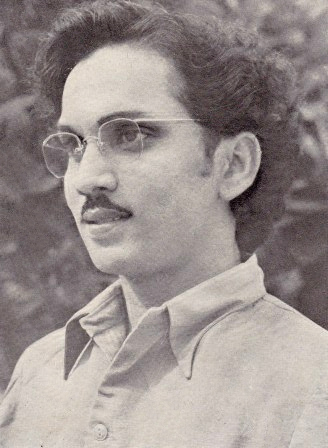
Akkineni Nageswara Rao

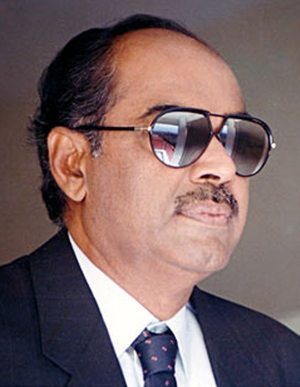
D. Ramanaidu

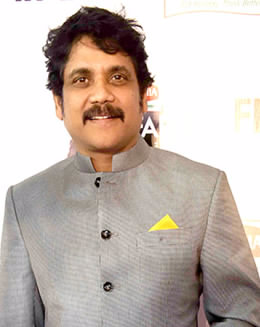
Nagarjuna (actor)

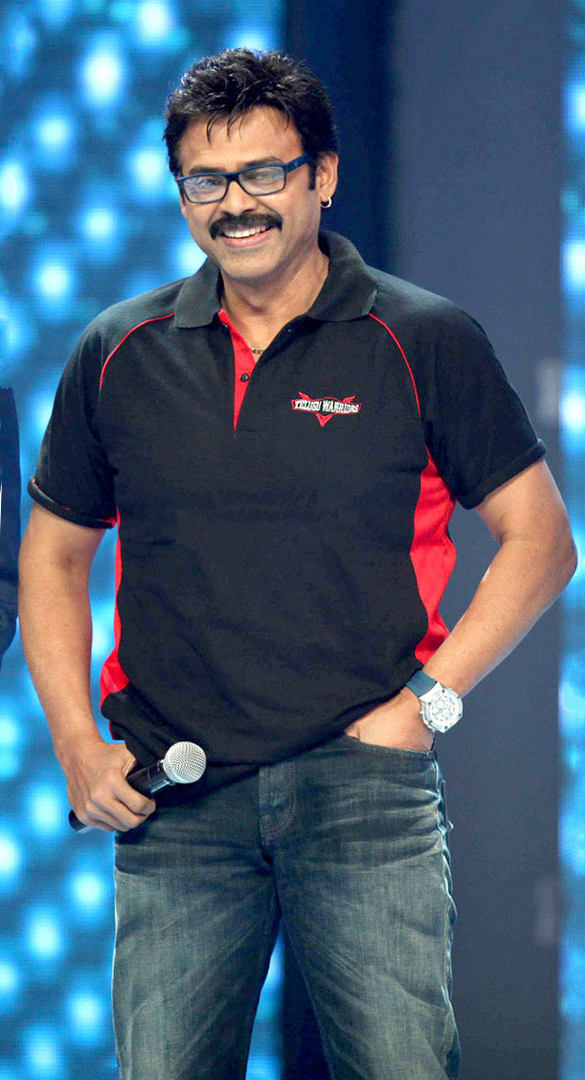
Venkatesh (actor)

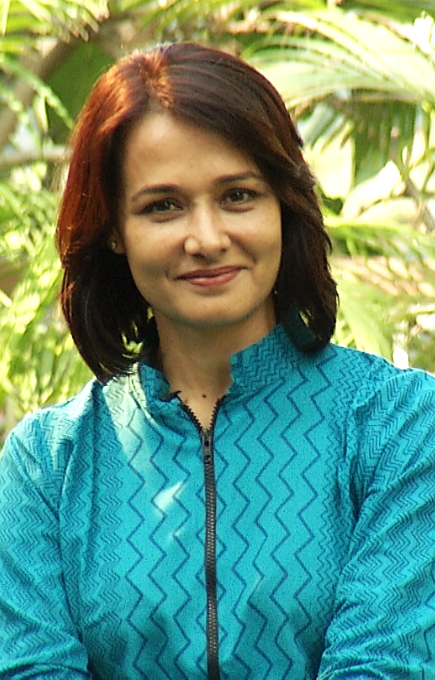
Amala Akkineni wife of Nagarjuna

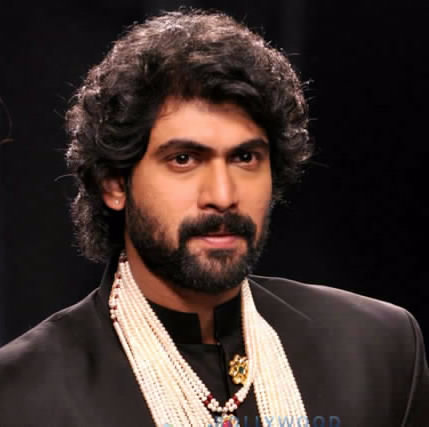
Rana Daggubati

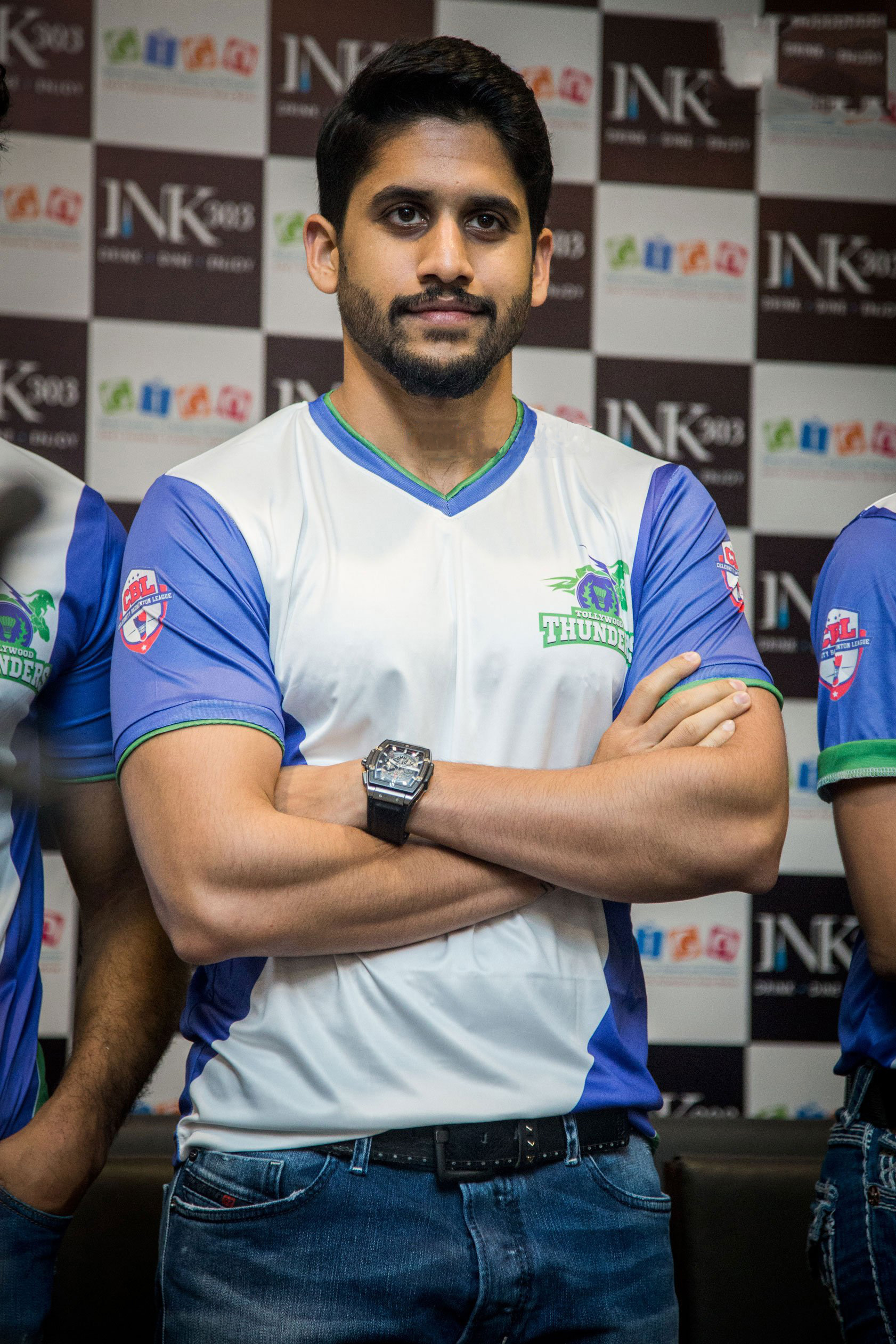
Naga Chaitanya

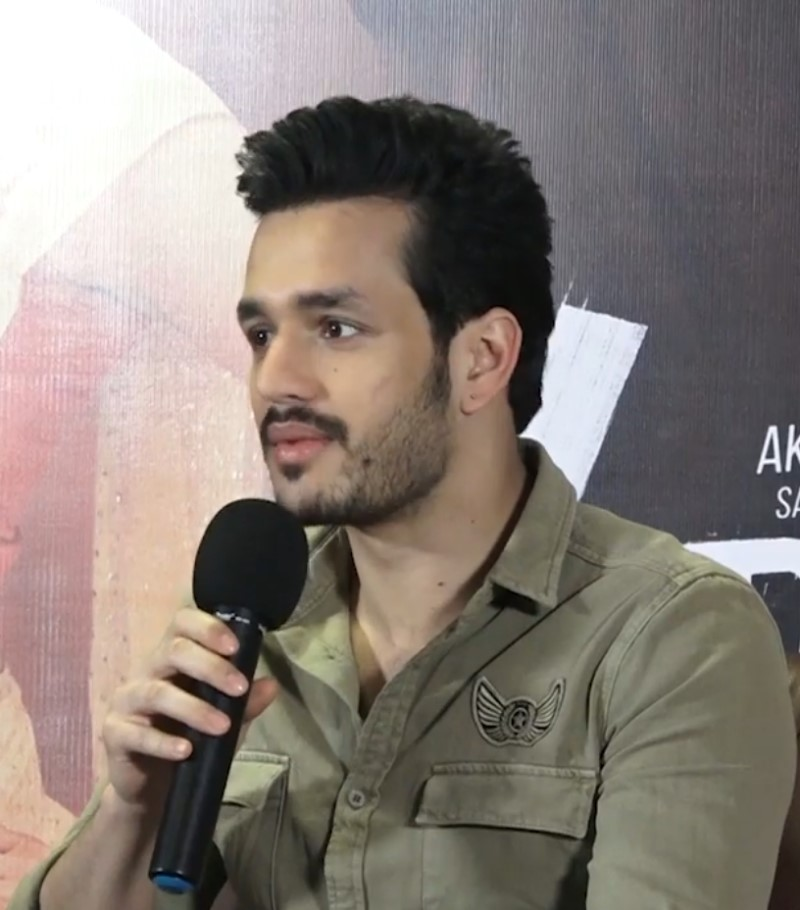
Akhil Akkineni

=== Akkineni Prasad (L. V. Prasad) family ===
- L. V. Prasad (Telugu and Hindi film producer, and Prasad's Group founder)
- Akkineni Ramesh Prasad son of L. V. Prasad, and owner of Prasads Group
- A. Sreekar Prasad (Malayalam, Tamil, Telugu and Hindi film editor, son of Akkineni Sanjeevi)
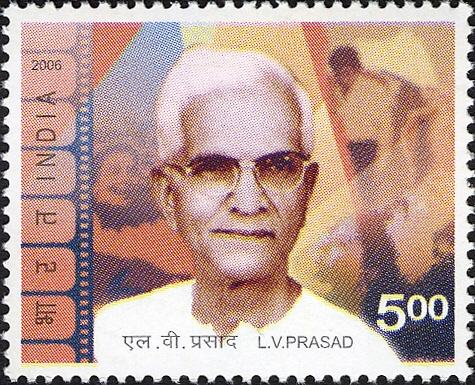
L. V. Prasad

=== Ambareesh family ===
- Chowdiah, musician
- Ambareesh, actor-politician, grand-nephew Chowdiah
- Sumalatha, actress-Politician, wife of Ambareesh
  - Abhishek Ambareesh, actor, son of Ambareesh and Sumalatha

=== Anandan family ===
- C. L. Anandan, actor (d. 1989).
- Disco Shanti, actress; daughter of C. L. Anandan.
  - Srihari, actor; husband of Disco Shanthi. (d. 2013)
- Lalitha Kumari, actress, daughter of C. L. Anandan.
  - Prakash Raj, actor; ex-husband of Lalitha Kumari.
    - Pony Verma, choreographer; wife of Prakash Raj.
    - Prasad Raj, actor; brother of Prakash Raj.

=== Asif Ali family ===
- Asif Ali, actor
  - Askar Ali, actor, younger brother of Asif

=== Azhagappan family ===
- A. L. Azhagappan, producer.
- A. L. Vijay, director; son of Azhagappan.
  - Amala Paul, actress; ex-wife of Vijay.
- Udhaya, film actor; son of Azhagappan.
  - Keerthika Udhaya, dubbing artiste; wife of Udhaya.
- Hamaresh, actor; grandson of Azhagappan.

== B ==
=== Balasubrahmanyam family ===
- S. P. Balasubrahmanyam, playback singer (d. 2020)
- S. P. B. Pallavi, playback singer; daughter of S. P. Balasubrahmanyam.
- S. P. Charan, playback singer; son of S. P. Balasubrahmanyam.
- S. P. Sailaja, playback singer; sister of S. P. Balasubrahmanyam.
  - Subhalekha Sudhakar, actor; husband of S. P. Sailaja.
- K. Viswanath, actor and director; uncle of S. P. Balasubrahmanyam.
  - Chandra Mohan, actor; cousin of K. Viswanath.

=== Bhagyaraj family ===
- K. Bhagyaraj, director.
- Praveena Bhagyaraj (d. 1983), actress; late wife of Bhagyaraj
- Poornima Bhagyaraj, actress; wife of Bhagyaraj
- Saranya Bhagyaraj, actress; daughter of Bhagyaraj
- Shanthanu Bhagyaraj, actor; son of Bhagyaraj
  - Keerthi Shanthanu, television personality; wife of Shanthnu. (see Subramanyam family)

=== Bhanupriya family ===
- Bhanupriya, actress.
  - Vindhya, actress; sister-in-law of Bhanupriya.
- Shantipriya, actress; sister of Bhanupriya.
  - Siddharth Ray (d. 2004), actor; husband of Shantipriya.
  - V. Shantaram (d. 1990), director; grandfather of Siddhanth Ray.

=== Bharathiraja family ===
- Bharathiraja, actor and director (d. 2026)
- Jayaraj, actor; brother of Bharathiraja
- Manoj Bharathiraja (d. 2025), director; son of Bharathiraja.
  - Nandana, actress; wife of Manoj.
- Manoj Kumar, director; brother-in-law of Director Bharathiraja.

== C ==
=== Chalasani family ===
- C. Aswini Dutt, producer and founder of Vyjayanthi Movies
  - Swapna Dutt, producer; daughter of Aswini Dutt.
  - Priyanka Dutt, producer; daughter of Aswini Dutt.
    - Nag Ashwin, film director and screenwriter; husband of Priyanka Dutt.

=== Chandrasekhar family ===
- S. A. Chandrasekhar, director
  - Xavier Britto, entrepreneur; brother-in-law of Chandrasekaran.
    - Sneha Britto, director; daughter of Xavier Britto. (see Murali family)
      - Akash, actor; husband of Sneha Britto
- Shoba Chandrasekhar, playback singer; wife of Chandrasekhar.
  - S. N. Surendar, Singer and Dubbing Artist, Brother of Sobha
    - Viraj, Actor, Son of Surendar
  - Sheela, actress; sister of Shoba.
    - Sanjeev, director; son of Sheela.
    - Vikranth, actor; son of Sheela.
      - Manasa, actress; wife of Vikranth.
        - Kanakadurga, actress; mother of Manasa.
- C. Joseph Vijay, Chief Minister of Tamil Nadu, Politician, Actor, Singer; Son of Chandrasekhar.
  - Sangeetha Sornalingam, Wife of Honorable Chief Minister of Tamil Nadu C. Joseph Vijay
    1. Jason Sanjay son of Honorable Chief Minister of Tamil Nadu C. Joseph Vijay
    2. Divya Sasha Daughter of Honorable Chief Minister of Tamil Nadu C. Joseph Vijay

=== Cho Ramaswamy family ===
- Cho Ramaswamy, actor.
- Ramya Krishnan, actress; niece of Cho Ramaswamy.
  - Krishna Vamsi, director; husband of Ramya Krishna.

=== Choudary family ===
- R. B. Choudary, producer.
  - Jithan Ramesh, actor; son of Choudary.
  - Jiiva, actor; son of Choudary.

=== Chittajallu family ===
- C. Pullayya, director
  - C. S. Rao, director, actor and writer; son of C. Pullaiah.
    - Rajasulochana, actress and classical dancer; wife of C.S. Rao.

== D ==
=== Deva family ===
- Deva, music director.
  - Srikanth Deva, music director; son of Deva.
    - Febi Mani, playback singer; wife of Srikanth Deva.
  - Sangeetha Bhaskar, playback singer; daughter of Deva.
    - Parthi Bhaskar, director; husband of Sangeetha. (see Ilaiyaraaja family)
- Murali, music director; brother of Deva.
  - Bobo Shashi, music director; son of Murali.
- Sabesh, music director; brother of Deva.
  - Karthik Sabesh, actor; son of Sabesh
- Jai, actor; nephew of Deva.

=== Deve Gowda family ===
- H. D. Deve Gowda (Politician, Former Prime Minister of India)
  - H. D. Kumaraswamy (film producer and politician; son of Devegowda)
  - Anitha Kumaraswamy (film producer; wife of Kumaraswamy)
  - Radhika Kumaraswamy (actress; second wife of Kumaraswamy)
    - Nikhil Kumaraswamy (actor; son of Kumaraswamy and Anitha Kumarswamy)
    - Revathi - wife of Nikhil
  - M. Krishnappa, Indian politician (grand uncle of Revathi)
    - Priya Krishna (politician, cousin of Revathi)
  - H. D. Revanna (politician; son of Devegowda)
  - Bhavani Revanna (politician, wife of Revanna)
    - Suraj Revanna(politician;son of Revanna)
    - Prajwal Revanna (politician; son of Revanna)
  - C. N. Manjunath (Indian cardiologist, son-in-law of Devegowda)
    - C. N. Balakrishna (politician, brother of Manjunath)

=== Dileep Family ===
- Dileep, actor; producer; businessman
  - Manju Warrier, actress; ex-wife of Dileep
  - Kavya Madhavan, actress; wife of Dileep

== F ==
=== Fazil family ===
- Fazil, director and actor.
  - Fahadh Faasil, actor and producer, son of Fazil
    - Nazriya Nazim, actress and producer, wife of Fahadh
    - Naveen Nazim, actor, brother of Nazriya, brother-in-law of Fahadh.
  - Farhaan Faasil, actor, son of Fazil, brother of Fahadh, brother-in-law of Nazriya.
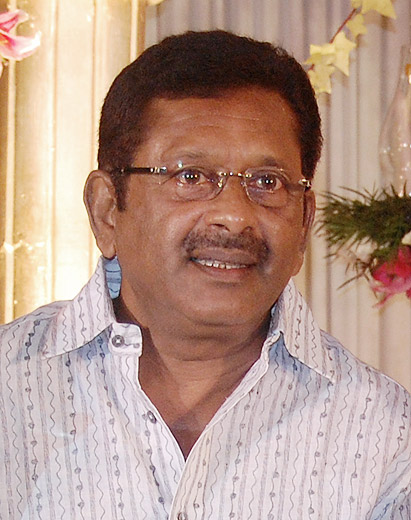
Fazil

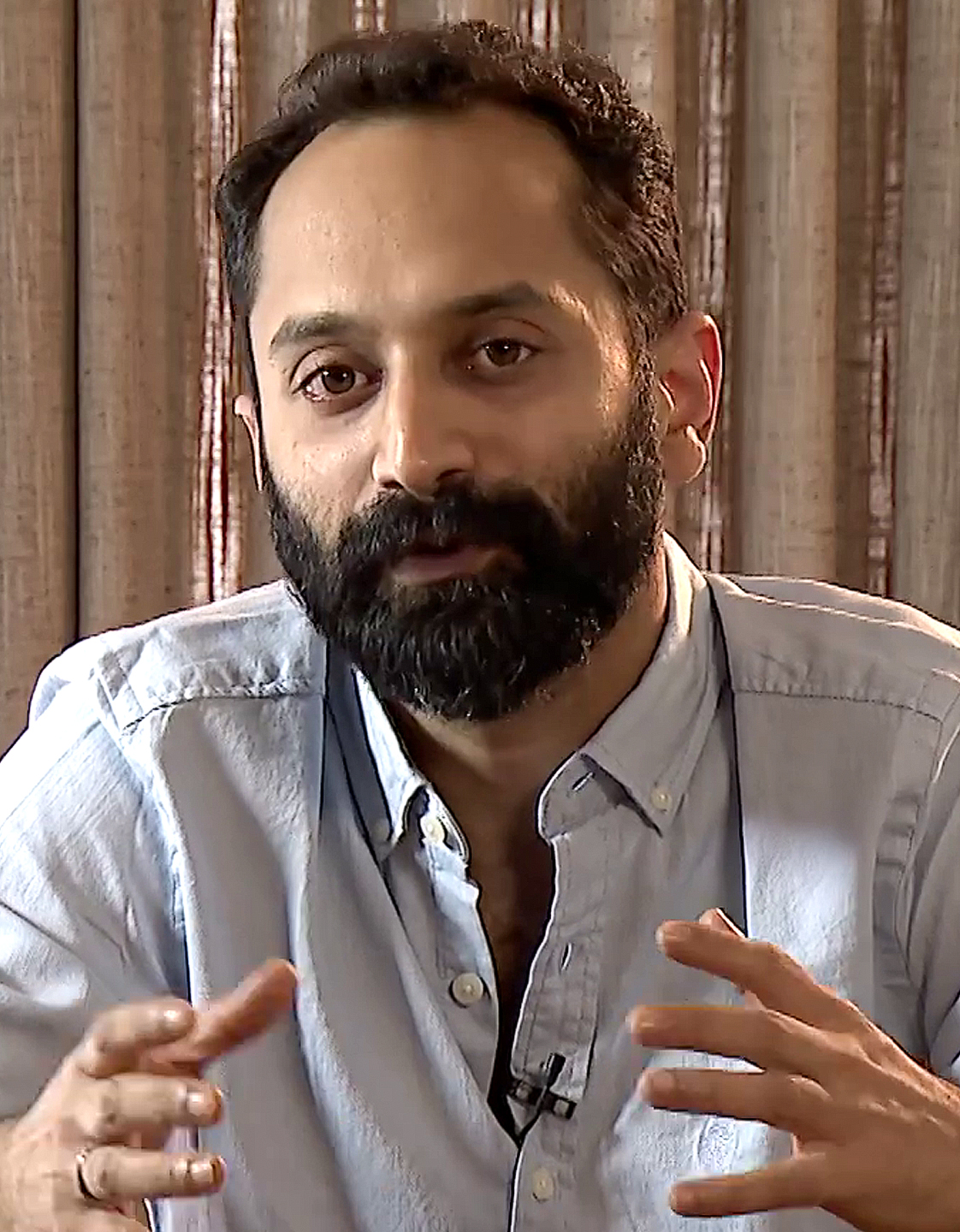
Fahadh Faasil

== G ==
=== Ghattamaneni family ===
- Krishna (actor, director and producer)
  - Ramesh Babu (actor and producer, elder son of Krishna and Indira)
  - Mahesh Babu (actor, producer and philanthropist, younger son of Krishna and Indira)
    - Namrata Shirodkar (actress, wife of Mahesh Babu)
  - Manjula Ghattamaneni (actress and producer, daughter of Krishna and Indira, sister of Mahesh Babu)
  - Sudheer Babu (actor, son-in-law of Krishna and Indira, husband of Priyadarshini Ghattamaneni)
  - Galla Ashok (actor, grandson of Krishna and Indira, son of Padmavathi Ghattamaneni and Jayadev Galla)
  - Vijaya Nirmala second wife of Krishna.
  - Naresh Murthy, actor, son of Viaya Nirmala
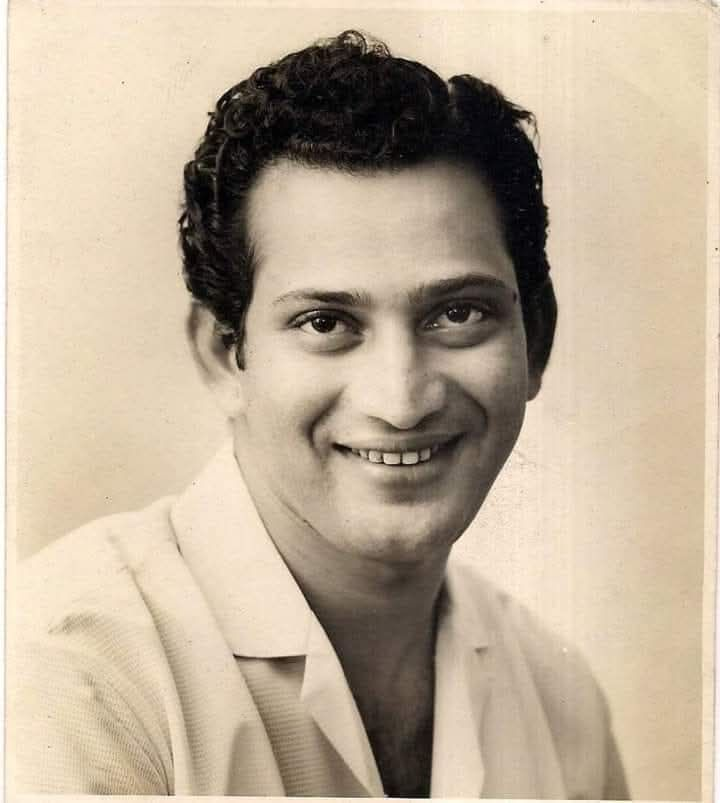
Krishna (Telugu actor)

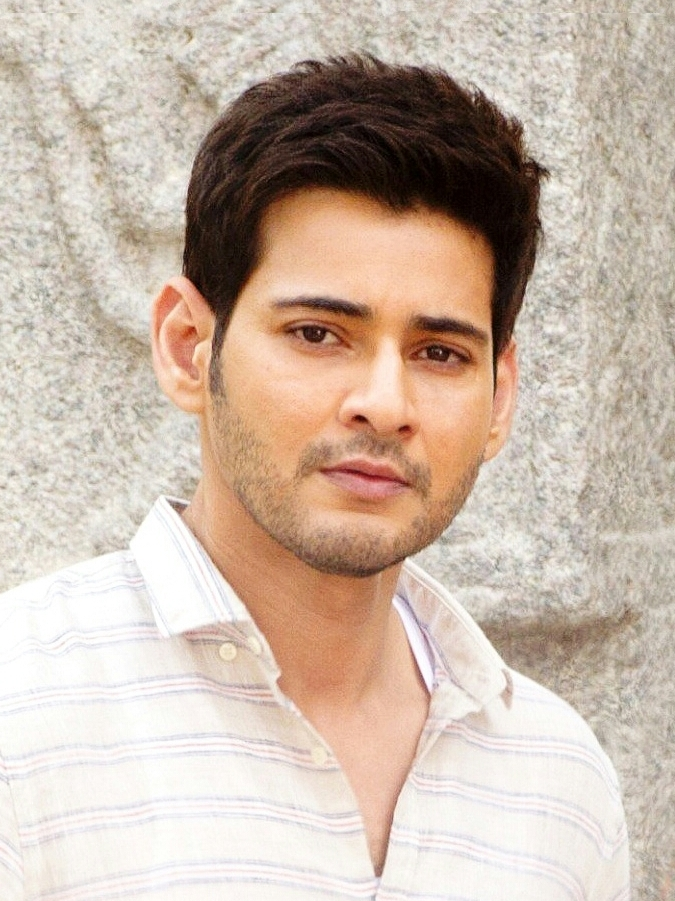
Mahesh Babu

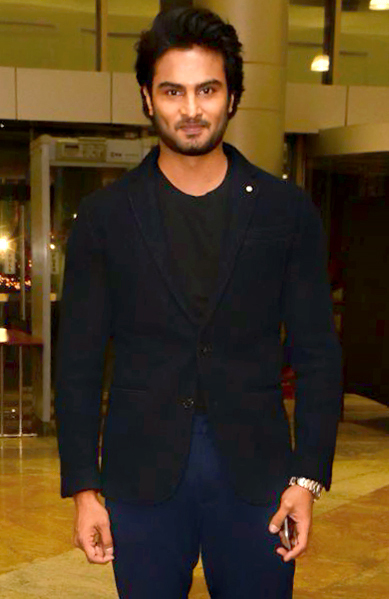
Sudheer Babu

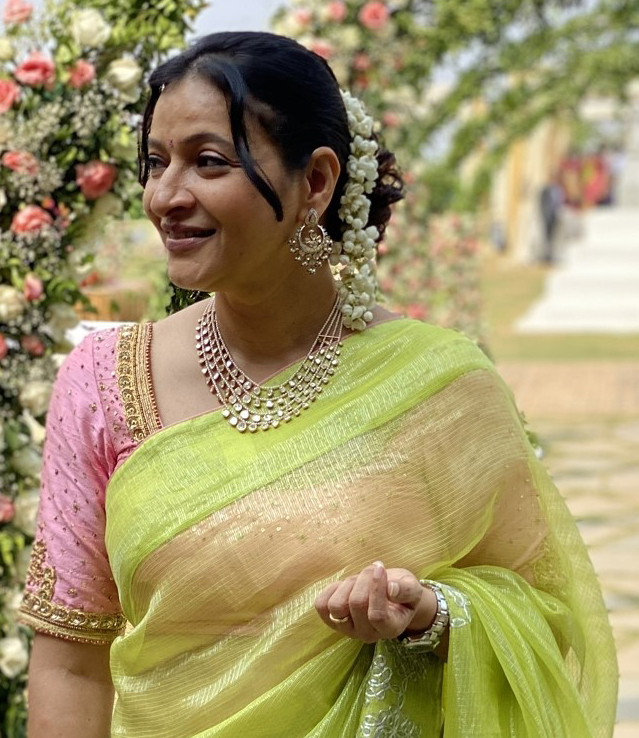
Manjula Ghattamaneni

=== Ghantasala Family ===
- Ghantasala Sai Srinivas, widely known as S. Thaman, composer, multi instrumentalist, conductor singer-songwriter, actor, and music producer.
- Ghantasala Balaramayya Grandfather to S. Thaman
- Ghantasala Siva Kumar, Composer and drummer, son of Ghantasala Balaramayya, father to S.Thaman
- Ghantasala Savitri, Playback singer, wife of Ghantasala Siva Kumar, mother to S. Thaman
- Ghantasala Sri Vardhini, Playback singer, wife of S. Thaman
- B. Vasantha, Playback singer, Aunt of S. Thaman.

=== Gemini Ganesan family ===
- Muthulakshmi Reddy, aunt of Gemini Ganesan
- Gemini Ganesan, actor (d. 2005).
- Pushpavalli, actress; partner of Gemini Ganesan (see Vedantham family).
- Savitri Ganesan, actress; second wife of Gemini Ganesan.
- Rekha, actress; daughter of Gemini Ganesan and Pushpavalli.
- Gigi, actress; daughter of Gemini Ganesan
- Abhinay Vaddi, actor, grandson of Gemini Ganesan and Savitri.
  - Medha Raghunath, actress; granddaughter-in-law of Gemini Ganesan.
  - Y. G. Madhuvanthi, actress; granddaughter-in-law of Gemini Ganesan (see Vyjanthimala family).
- Vedantam Raghavayya, filmmaker; brother-in-law of Pushpavalli.
- Tej Sapru, actor; brother-in-law of Rekha.
- Shubha, actress; niece of Pushpavalli.
- Kamala Selvaraj, doctor; half-sister of Rekha.

=== Gowda family ===
- K. C. N. Gowda, producer. (d. 2012)
- K. C. N. Chandrasekhar, producer; son of KCN Gowda.
- K. C. N. Mohan, producer; son of KCN Gowda.
  - Poornima Mohan (d. 2017), director; wife of K. C. N. Mohan.

== H ==
=== Haasan family ===
- Kamal Haasan, Actor, film producer, film director, screenwriter, playback singer, lyricist, television presenter, choreographer, dancer, philanthropist & politician
  - Vani Ganapathy, classical dancer; ex-wife of Kamal Haasan
  - Sarika, actress; ex-wife of Kamal Haasan
  - Shruti Haasan, elder daughter of Kamal Haasan and Sarika.
  - Akshara Haasan, younger daughter of Kamal Haasan and Sarika
  - Gautami, actress; ex-partner of Kamal Haasan.
- Charuhasan, actor; brother of Kamal Haasan.
  - Komalam, actress; wife of Charuhasan.
  - Suhasini Maniratnam, actress; daughter of Charuhasan and Komalam.
    - Mani Ratnam, director; husband of Suhasini.
      - G. Venkateswaran, producer (d. 2003); brother of Mani Ratnam.
      - G. Srinivasan, producer (d. 2007); brother of Mani Ratnam.
- Chandrahasan, producer (d. 2017); brother of Kamal Haasan.
  - Geethamani; wife of Chandrahasan.
  - Anu Hasan, actress; daughter of Chandrahasan.
- Nalini Raghu, dancer; sister of Kamal Haasan.
  - Gautam Kanthadai, actor; son of Nalini Raghu
- Rama Ramasamy, actress; cousin of Kamal Haasan.
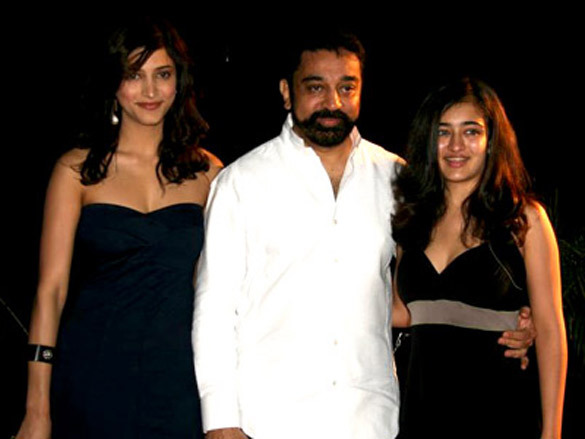
Kamal Haasan with daughters Shruti Haasan (left) and Akshara Haasan (right) in 2010.

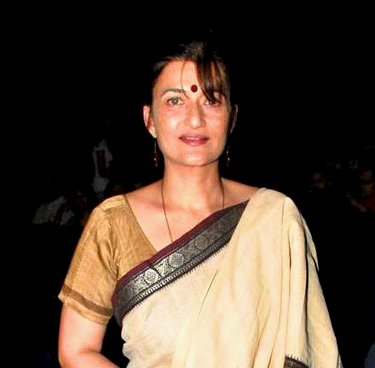
Sarika

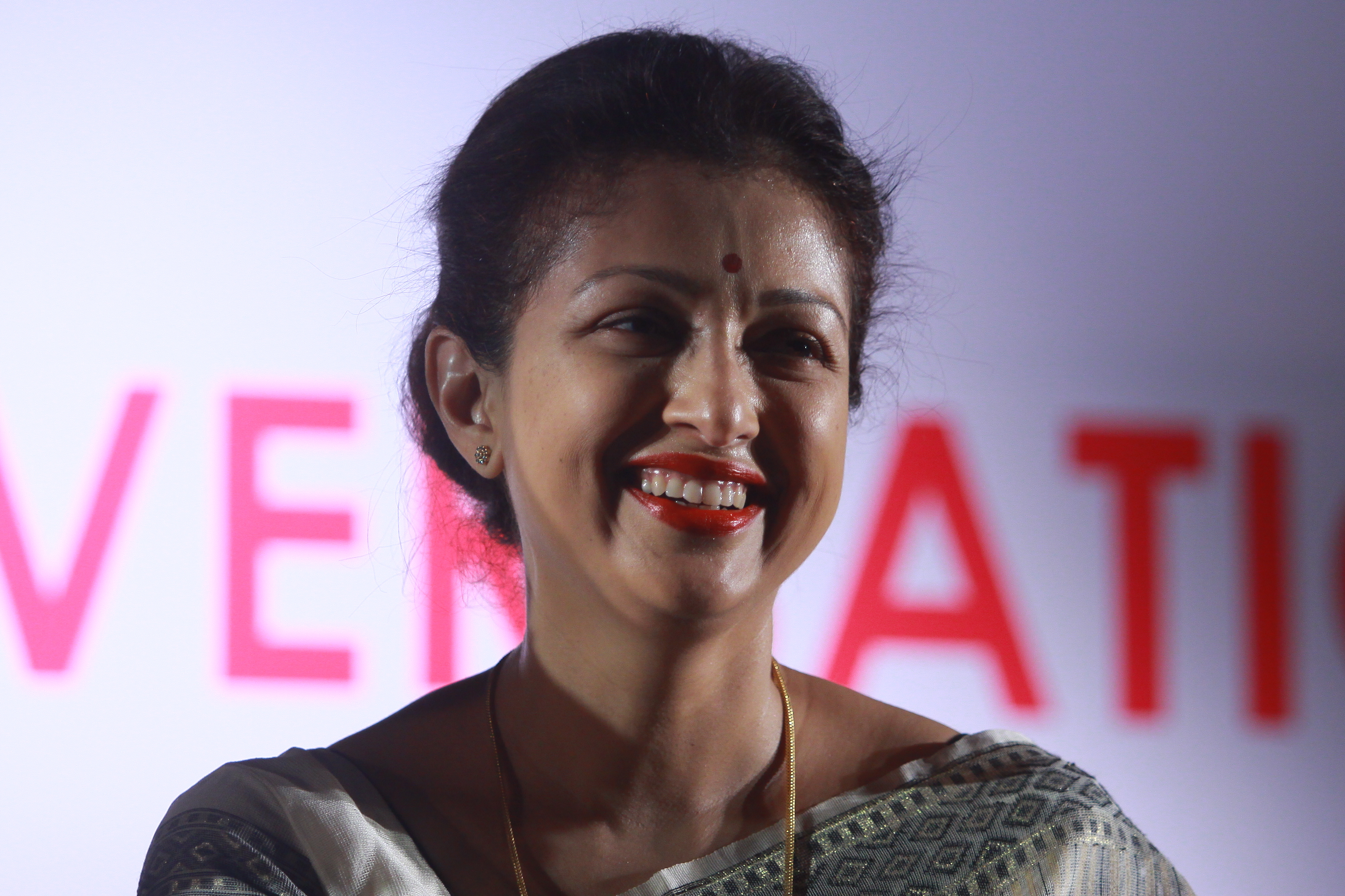
Gautami

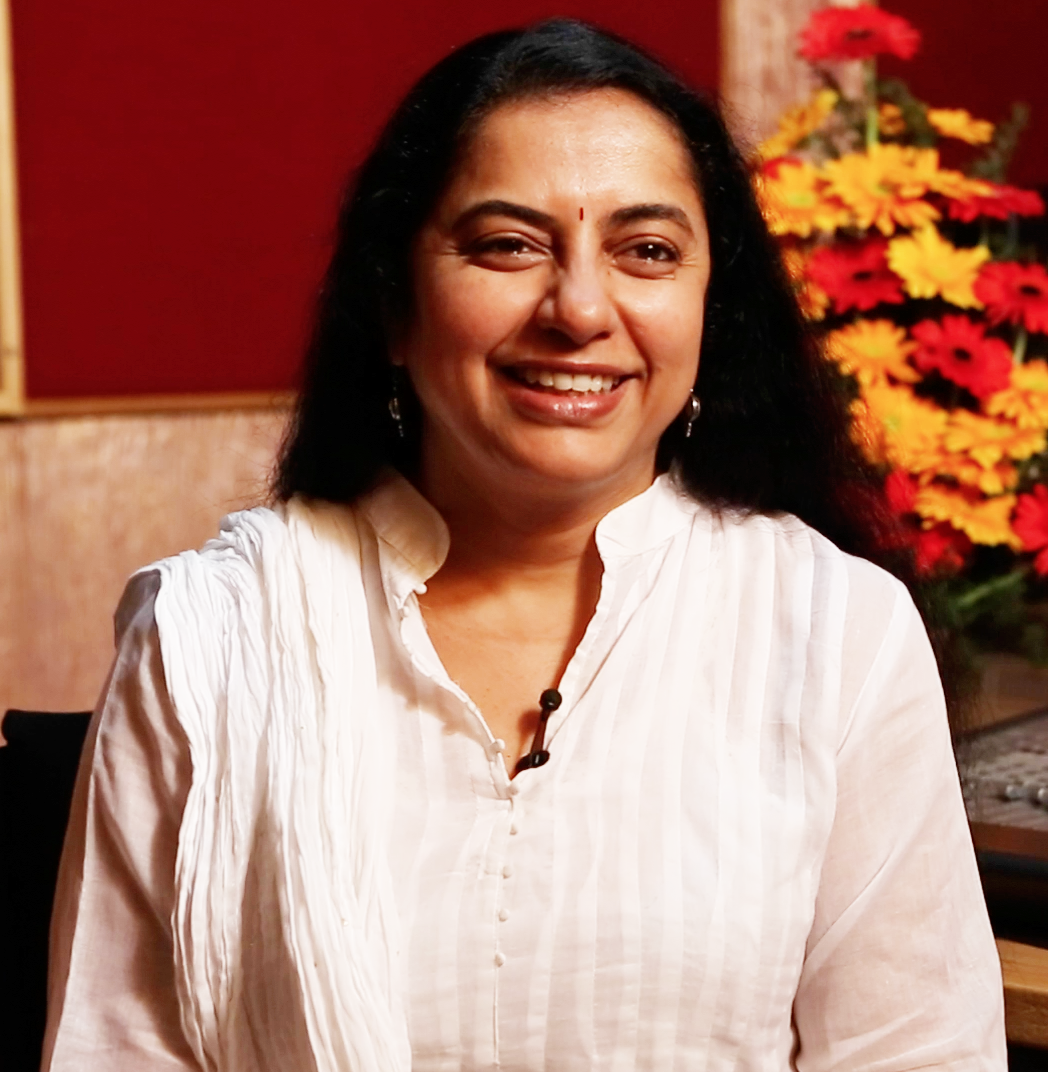
Suhasini Maniratnam

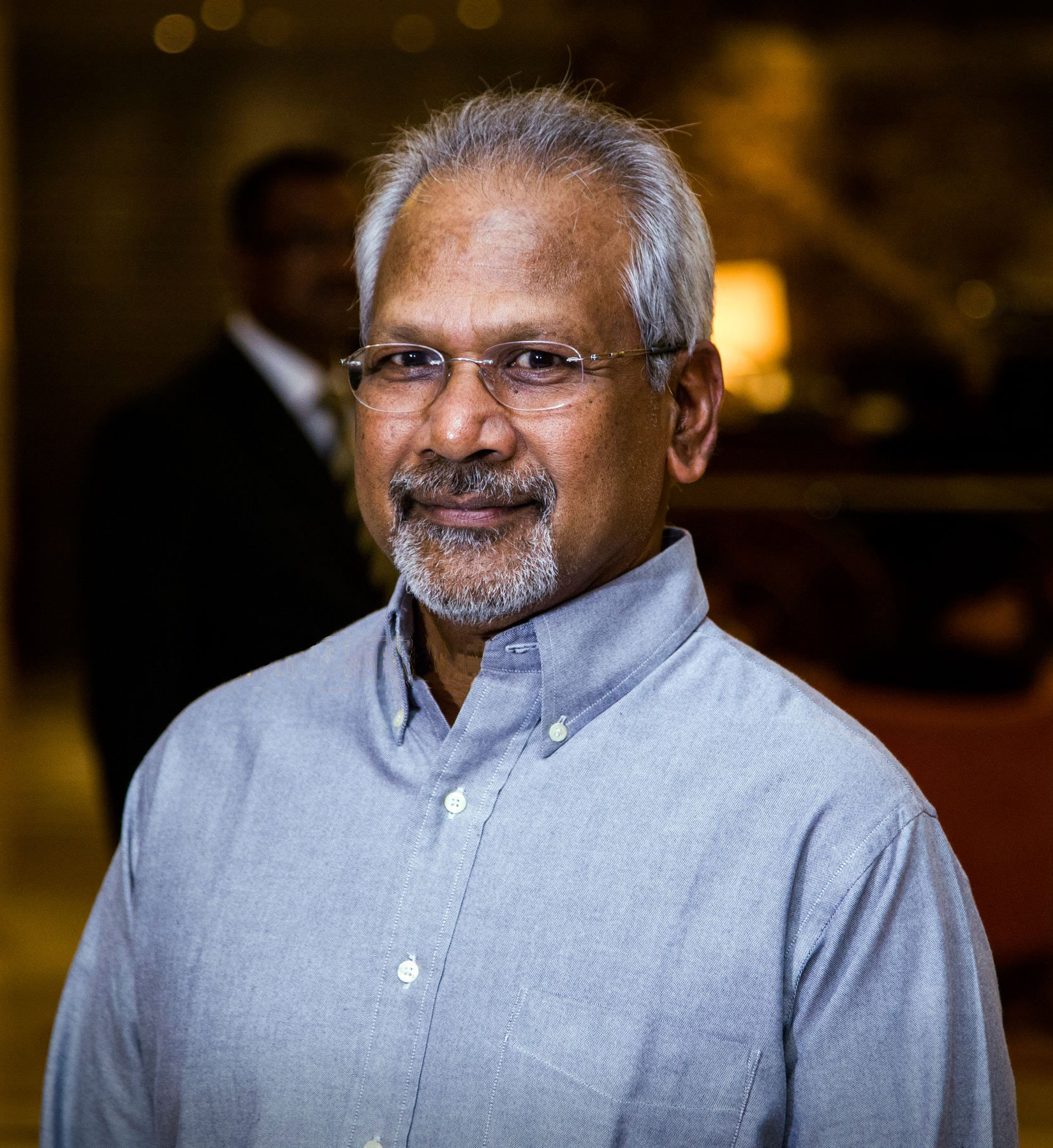
Mani Ratnam

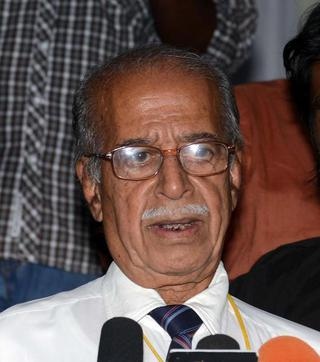
Chandrahasan

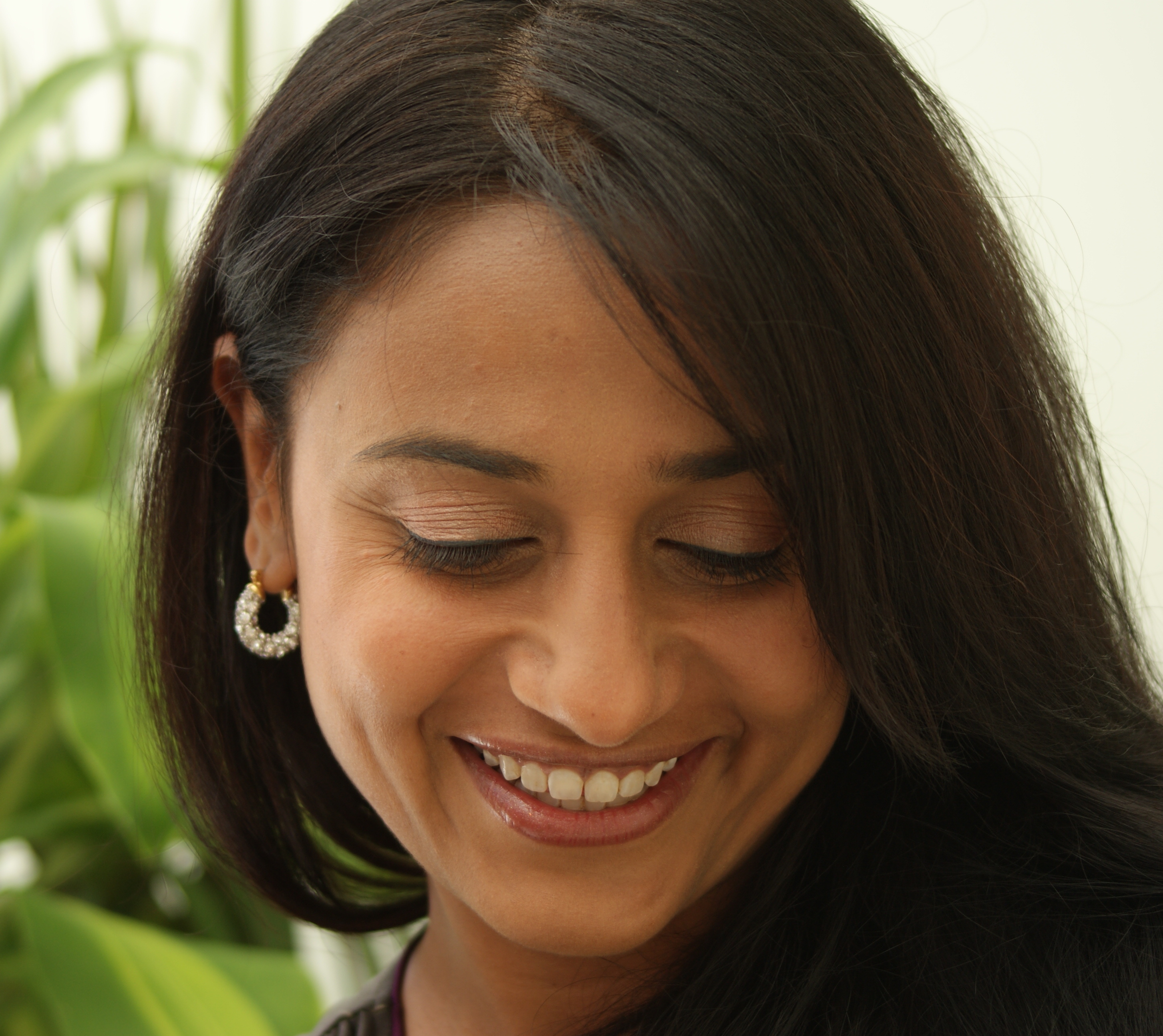
Anu Hasan

=== Hema Chaudhary Family ===
- Brindavana Chaudhary, Telugu actress and mother of Hema Chaudhary
- Hema Chaudhary, Actress and Dancer

=== Hunsur family ===
- Hunsur Krishnamurthy, producer and director. (d. 1989)
- H. R. Bhargava, director; cousin of Hunsur Krishnamurthy.
- Dwarakish, actor
  - Giri Dwarakish, actor; son of Dwarakish.

== I ==
=== Ilaiyaraaja family ===
- Ilaiyaraaja, music director.
  - Karthik Raja, music director; son of Ilaiyaraaja.
    - Yatheeswaran, playback singer; son of Karthik Raja.
  - Yuvan Shankar Raja, music director; son of Ilaiyaraaja.
    - Zafroon Nizar, costume designer; wife of Yuvan.
  - Bhavatharani, playback singer; daughter of Ilaiyaraaja.(d. 2024)
- Gangai Amaran, music director; brother of Ilaiyaraaja.
  - Venkat Prabhu, director; son of Gangai Amaran.
  - Premji Amaran, actor; son of Gangai Amaran.
- R. D. Bhaskar, producer; brother of Ilaiyaraaja.
  - Parthi Bhaskar, director; son of Bhaskar.
    - Sangeetha Bhaskar, playback singer; wife of Parthi. (see Deva family)
  - Hari Bhaskar, playback singer; son of Bhaskar.
  - Vasuki Bhaskar, costume designer; daughter of Bhaskar.
- Pavalar Varadharajan, music director; half-brother of Ilaiyaraaja.
  - Ilaiya Gangai, music director; son of Pavalar Varadharajan.
  - Pavalar Shiva, music director; son of Pavalar Varadharajan.
  - Jo V, director; son of Pavalar Varadharajan.

=== Iyer family ===
- Sundaram Iyer, actor.
- S. Rajam, actor; son of Iyer. (d.2010)
- S. Balachander, director; son of Iyer. (d.1990)
- S. Jayalakshmi, actress; daughter of Iyer. (d.2007)
- Jayashree, actress; granddaughter of Jayalakshmi.

== J ==
=== Jaggesh family ===
- Jaggesh, actor, director.
  - Gururaj Jaggesh, actor; son of Jaggesh
  - Yathiraj Jaggesh, actor; son of Jaggesh
- Komal Kumar, actor; brother of Jaggesh

=== Jayan family ===
- Jayan, Malayalam actor.
- Jayabharathi, actress, Cousin of Jayan.
  - Hari Pothen, producer; ex-husband of Jayabharathi.
    - Pratap Pothen, actor; brother of Hari. (see Radha family)
  - Sathaar, actor; ex-husband of Jayabharathi.
- Krish J. Sathaar, actor; son of Jayabharathi and Sathaar.
- Adithya Jayan, actor; nephew of Jayan.
- Munna Simon, actor; nephew of Jayabharathi.
- Ajayan, actor, younger brother of Jayan .

=== Jayachitra family ===
- Jayachitra, actress
- Amresh Ganesh, actor and music composer; son of Jayachitra
- Jayasree, actress; mother of Jayachitra

=== Jayadev family ===
- Devayani, actress; daughter of Jayadev.
  - Rajakumaran, director; husband of Devayani.
- Nakkhul, actor; brother of Devayani.
- Mayur, actor; brother of Devayani.

=== Jayalalithaa family ===
- J. Jayalalithaa, actress and former Chief minister of Tamil Nadu
- Sandhya, actress; mother of Jayalalithaa
  - Vidyavathi, actress; sister of Sandhya.

=== Jayaram family ===
- Jayaram, actor
- Parvathy Jayaram, actress; wife of Jayaram
- Kalidas Jayaram, actor, son of Jayaram and Parvathy

=== Jeeva family ===
- Jeeva, cinematographer. (d.2007)
- Aneez Jeeva, costume designer; wife of Jeeva.
  - Vasanth, director; Husband of Jeeva's Sister.
  - Ritvik Varun, actor; son of Vasanth.

== K ==
=== Kalabhavan Abi family ===
- Kalabhavan Abi, actor (d. 2017)
  - Shane Nigam, actor, son of Kalabhavan Abi

=== Kallara Sarasamma family ===
- Kallara Sarasamma, politician and wife of Kunjan Nair
  - Radha, actress; daughter of Sarasamma and Kunjan Nair
    - Rajasekaran Nair, entrepreneur and restaurateur
      - Karthika Nair, actress; daughter of Radha and Rajasekaran Nair
      - Thulasi Nair, actress; daughter of Radha and Rajasekaran Nair
  - Ambika, actress; daughter of Sarasamma and Kunjan Nair
    - Ravikanth, actor, ex-husband of Ambika
  - Suresh Nair, director; son of Sarasamma and Kunjan Nair
    - Gauri Nambiar, actress; cousin of Karthika

=== Kamesh family ===
- Kamala Kamesh, actress
- Uma Riyaz Khan, actress; daughter of Kamesh.
  - Riyaz Khan, actor; husband of Uma.
  - Shariq Khan, actor; son of Riyaz and Uma.
  - Samshad Khan, actor; son of Riyaz and Uma.

=== Kannadasan family ===
- Kannadasan, poet
- Parvathi Kannadasan, Wife of Kannadasan
- Ponnammal Kannadasan, Wife of kannadasan
- Gandhi Kannadasan, publisher, son of Kannadasan
- Dr.Kamal Kannadasan, Dental Professor, son of Kannadasan
- Srinivasan Kannadasan, Agri Officer, son of Kannadasan
- Muthiah Kannadasan, actor, grand son of Kannadasan
- Vishali Kannadasan, writer; daughter of Kannadasan
- Annadurai Kannadasan, writer, producer, lyric writer, director actor, son of Kannadasan
- Kanmani Subbu, poet and writer; son of Kannadasan
- Kalaivanan Kannadasan, director; son of Kannadasan
  - Aadhav Kannadasan, actor; son of Kalaivanan Kannadasan
- Panchu Arunachalam, poet, screenwriter, producer; nephew of Kannadasan
  - Subbu Panchu, actor, producer; son of Panchu Arunachalam
- Revathi Shanmugam, anchor; daughter of Kannadasan
  - Sathyalakshmi Kannadasan, producer; granddaughter of Kannadasan

=== Karunanidhi family ===
- M. Karunanidhi, Former Chief Minister of Tamil Nadu
- M. K. Muthu (actor; son of Karunanidhi)
- M.K Stalin (Politician and former Chief Minister of Tamil Nadu, son of Karunanidhi, father of Udhayanidhi Stalin)
- Kanimozhi (politician, poet and journalist, daughter of Karunanidhi)
- M.K.Tamilarasu (Producer; Businessman; son of Karunanidhi)
- Arivunidhi (playback singer; son of Muthu)
- Dayanidhi Azhagiri (producer; son of Alagiri)
  - Anusha Dhayanidhi (playback singer; wife of Dhayanidhi Alagiri)
- Udhayanidhi Stalin (Actor; Producer; Politician and Current Minister; son of M.K Stalin)
  - Kiruthiga Udhayanidhi, director; wife of Udhayanidhi Stalin.
- Arulnithi, actor; son of Tamilarasu.
- Gunanidhi Amirtham, producer; grandson of Karunanidhi.
  - Murasoli Maran, director; nephew of Karunanidhi.
  - Kalanithi Maran, producer; Business Man; son of Murasoli Maran.
  - C. S. Jayaraman, playback singer; father-in-law of Muthu.
  - Kaviya Maran, daughter of Kalanidhi Maran.
  - Akshita Vikram, playback singer; Daughter of Vikram (actor), granddaughter-in-law of Muthu. (see Thiagarajan family)

=== Karunas family ===
- Karunas, actor.
- Grace Karunas, playback singer; wife of Karunas.
- Ken Karunas, actor; son of Karunas.

=== Kasthuri Raja family ===
- Kasthuri Raja, director.
- Selvaraghavan, director; son of Kasthuri Raja.
  - Sonia Agarwal, actress; ex-wife of Selvaragahvan.
  - Gitanjali Selvaraghavan, director; wife of Selvaragahvan.
    - Mohan Raman, actor; uncle of Gitanjali.
      - V. P. Raman, Indian lawyer and politician, father of Mohan Raman.
      - Vidyullekha Raman, actress; daughter of Mohan.
- Vimalageetha, producer; daughter of Kasthuri Raja.
  - Pavish Narayan, grandson of Kasthuri Raja, son of Vimalageetha.
- Dhanush, actor; son of Kasthuri Raja.
  - Aishwarya Rajinikanth, ex-wife of Dhanush, producer; director; daughter of Rajinikanth (see Rajinikanth family)
- Karthiga Karthik; Doctor; daughter of Kasthuri Raja

=== Kunchacko family ===
- Kunchacko, director and producer. (d.1976)
  - Boban Kunchacko, actor, producer and director; son of Kunchacko. (d.2004)
  - Kunchacko Boban, actor and producer; grandson of Kunchacko
- Navodaya Appachan, director and producer; brother of Kunchacko. (d.2012)
  - Jijo Punnoose, actor, producer and director; son of Appachan
  - Jose Appachan, actor, producer and director; son of Appachan

=== Kiriyath family ===
- Balu Kiriyath, director, producer, writer, lyrist.
  - Paarvati Kiriyath, Celebrity designer; daughter of Balu Kiriyath. (d.1988)
  - Rajan Kiriyath, writer; brother of Balu Kiriyath
  - Vinu Kiriyath, writer and producer; brother of Balu Kiriyath.

=== Koduri family ===
- Siva Shakthi Datta, lyricist; elder brother of V. Vijayendra Prasad
  - M. M. Keeravani, music director; son of Siva Shakthi Datta
    - M. M. Srivalli, line producer; wife of Keeravani and elder sister of Rama Rajamouli
      - Kaala Bhairava, singer and music director; elder son of Keeravani
      - Sri Simha Koduri, actor; younger son of Keeravani
  - S. S. Kanchi, writer, actor, director; son of Siva Shakthi Datta, younger brother of Keeravani and elder brother of Kalyani Malik.
  - Kalyani Malik, music director; son of Siva Shakthi Datta, younger brother of Keeravani
- V. Vijayendra Prasad, writer; younger brother of Siva Shakti Datta
  - S. S. Rajamouli, director; son of V. Vijayendra Prasad.
    - Rama Rajamouli, costume designer; wife of S. S. Rajamouli and younger sister of M. M. Srivalli
      - S. S. Karthikeya, assistant director, production manager; son of Rama through her previous marriage and adopted son of Rajamouli
- M. M. Srilekha, music director; cousin of Rajamouli and Keeravani.
- Raja Koduri, tech executive; cousin of Rajamouli and Keeravani.
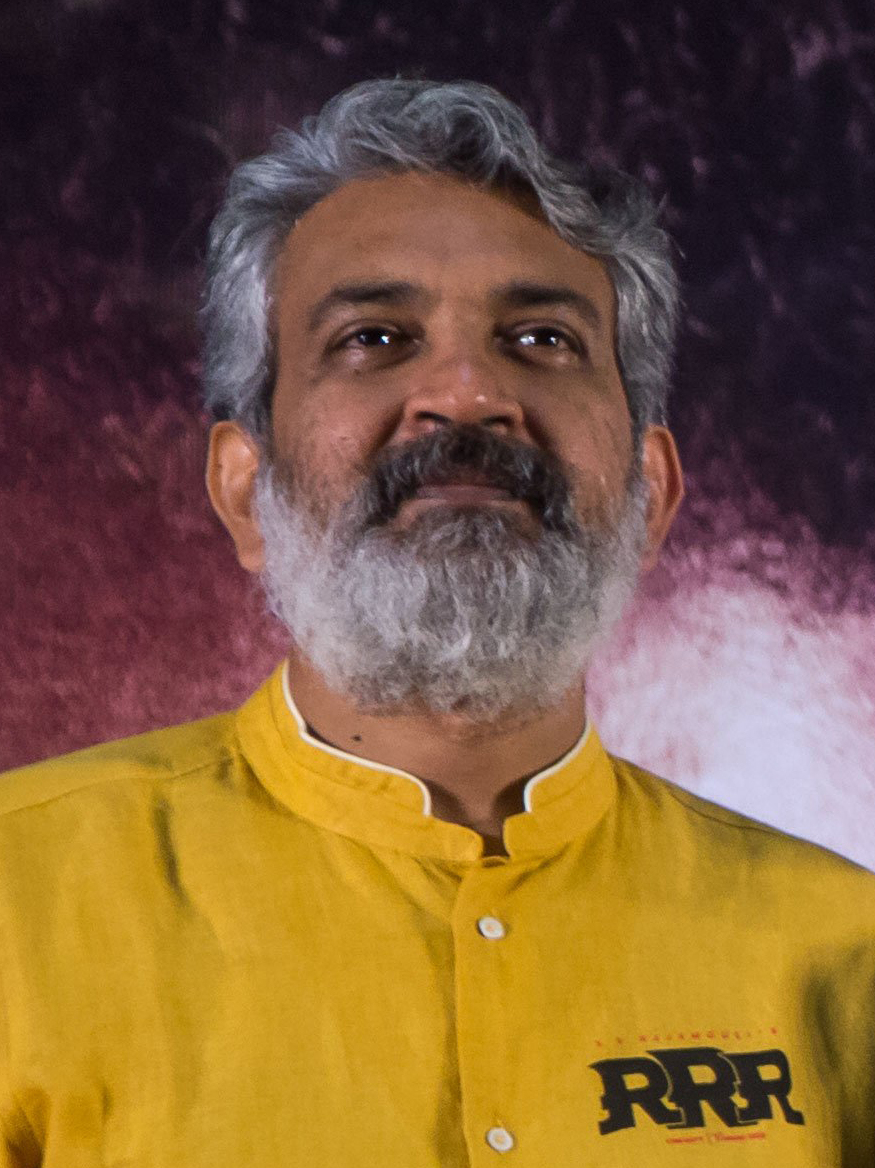
S. S. Rajamouli

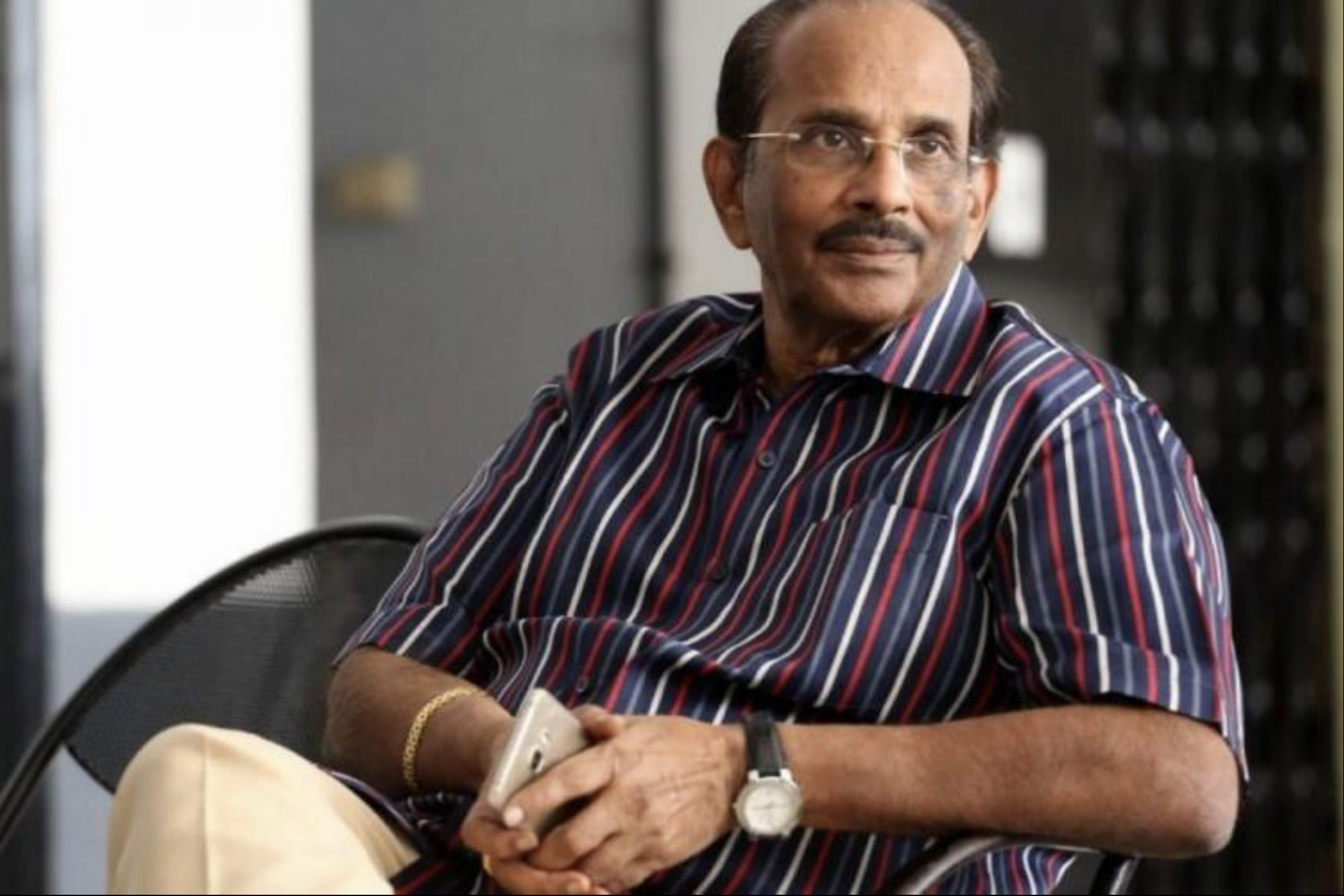
V. Vijayendra Prasad

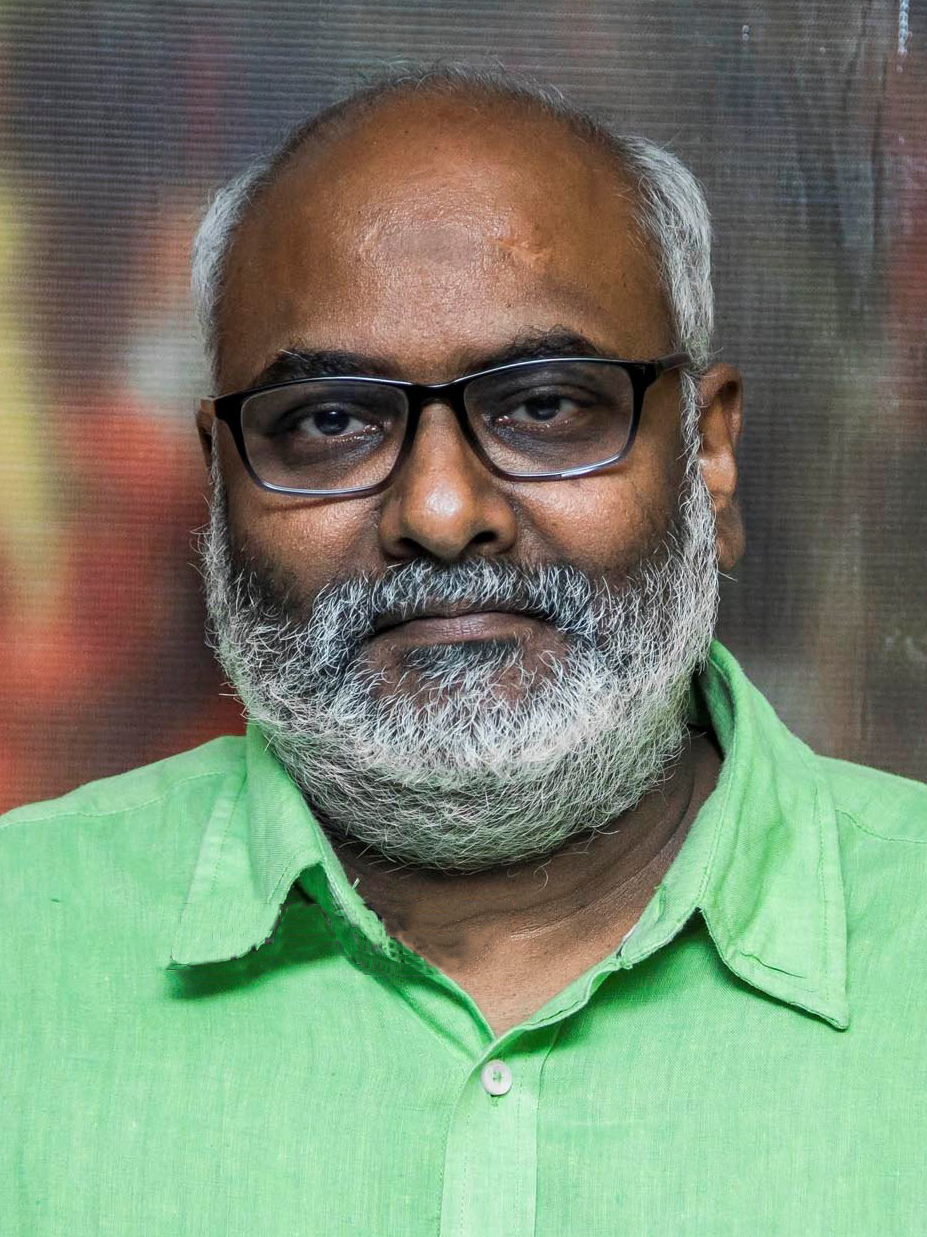
M. M. Keeravani

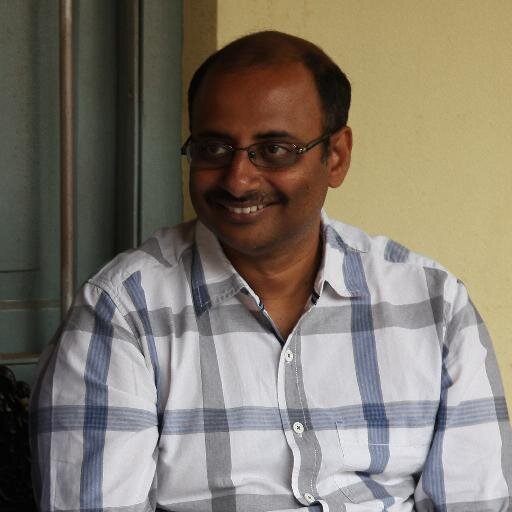
S. S. Kanchi

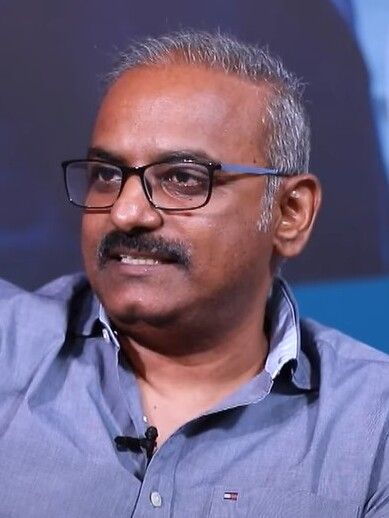
Kalyani Malik

=== Komal Swaminathan family ===
- Komal Swaminathan, director. (d.1995)
- Anand Shankar, director; grandson of Swaminathan.
- Varun R Swaminathan, YouTuber; grandson of Swaminathan
- Srikanth Ravichandran, director; cousin of Anand Shankar.
  - Dhivyadharshini, actress; ex-wife of Srikanth.
    - Priyadharshini, sister of Dhivyadharshini

=== Konidela and Allu family ===
Konidela–Allu is a prominent Indian film family known for their work in Telugu cinema. At least two generations of the Konidela family and three generations of Allu family are involved in films, business ventures, and politics. Prominent heads of the family are actor-politician Chiranjeevi, and his father-in-law Allu Ramalingaiah.

- Chiranjeevi (actor, former Minister of Tourism and son-in-law of Allu Ramalingaiah)
  - Ram Charan (actor, producer – son of Chiranjeevi)
- Vijaya Durga, sister of Chiranjeevi
  - Sai Durgha Tej (actor – son of Vijaya Durga, nephew of Chiranjeevi)
  - Panja Vaisshnav Tej ( actor – son of Vijaya Durga, nephew of Chiranjeevi)
- Nagendra Babu (actor, producer – brother of Chiranjeevi)
  - Varun Tej (actor, producer – son of Naga Babu)
    - Lavanya Tripathi, (actress, wife of Varun Tej)
  - Niharika Konidela (actress, producer – daughter of Naga Babu)
- Pawan Kalyan (actor, Current Deputy Chief Minister Of Andhra Pradesh, brother of Chiranjeevi)
- Allu Ramalingaiah (actor and comedian, father-in-law of Chiranjeevi)
  - Allu Aravind (producer, distributor and businessman) – son of Allu Ramalingaiah and brother-in-law of Chiranjeevi
    - Allu Arjun (actor – son of Allu Aravind, nephew of Chiranjeevi)
    - Allu Sirish (actor, producer – son of Allu Aravind, nephew of Chiranjeevi)
    - Allu Venkatesh (producer - son of allu aravind, nephew of Chiranjeevi)
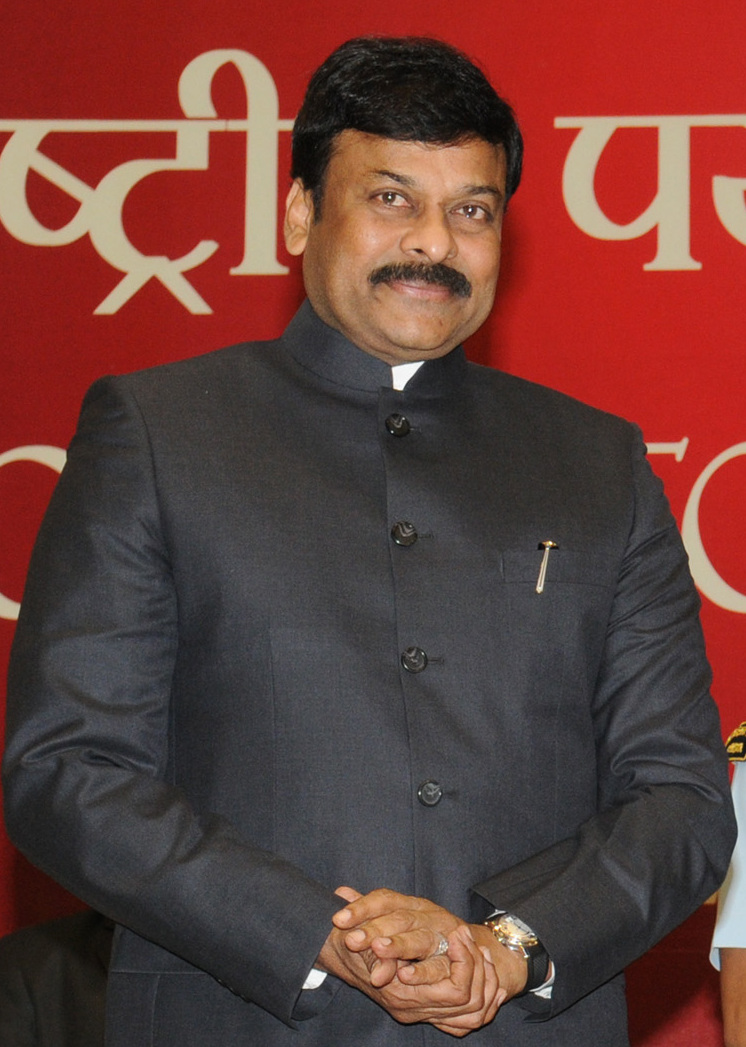
Chiranjeevi

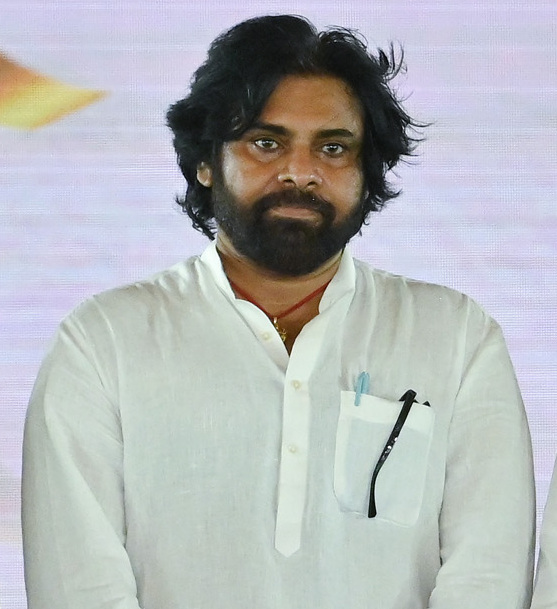
Pawan Kalyan

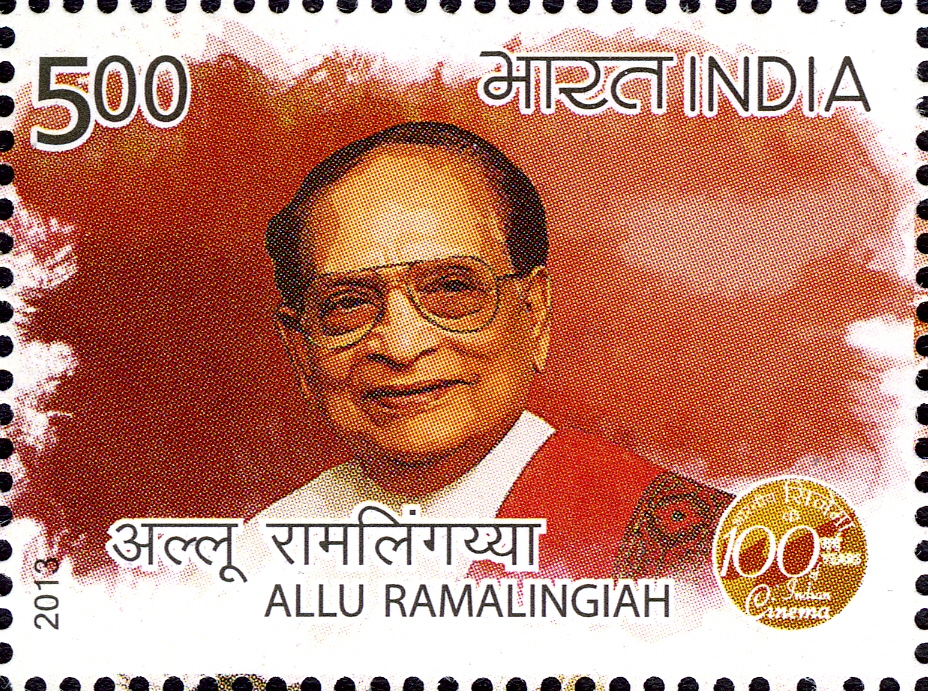
Allu Ramalingaiah

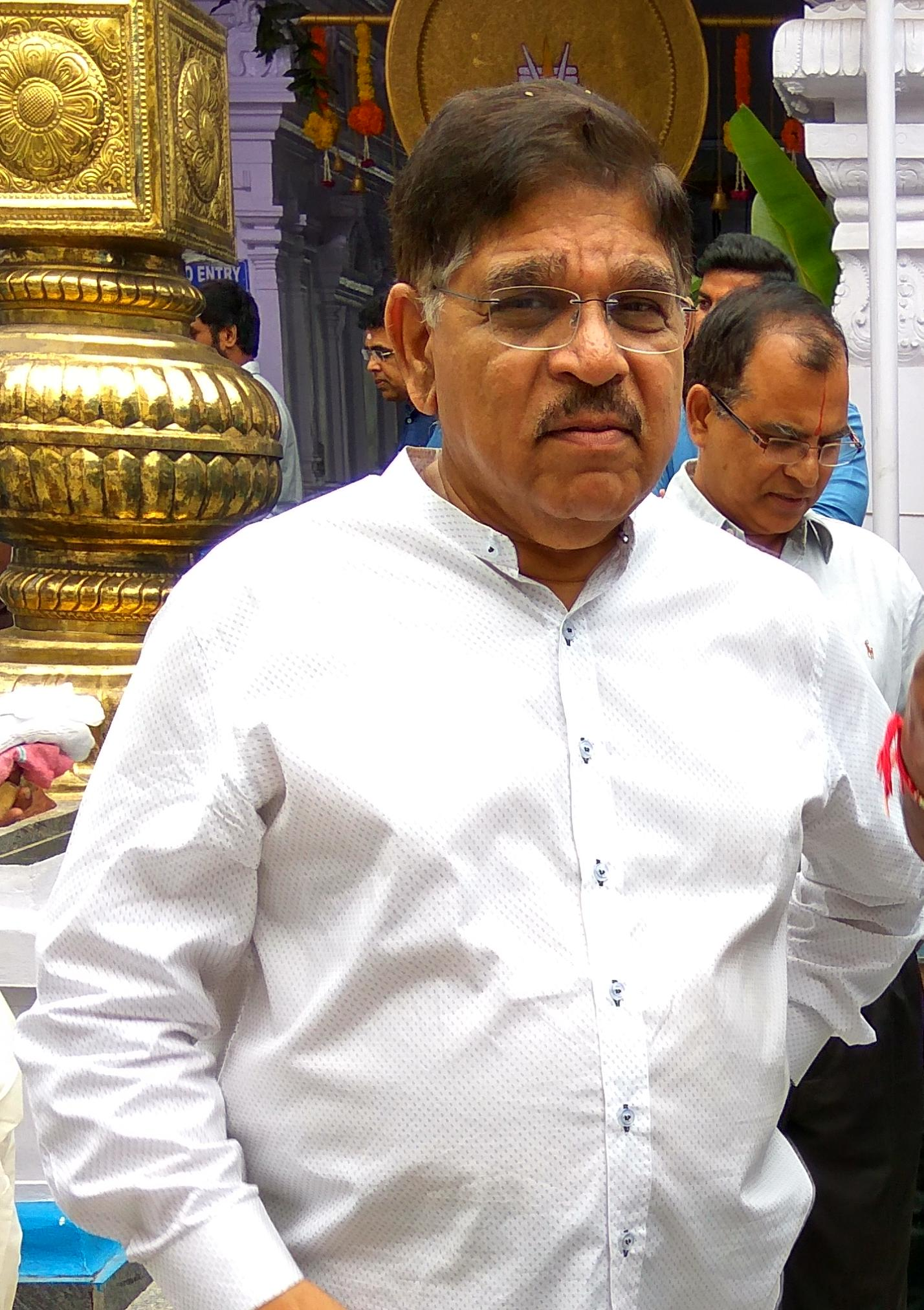
Allu Aravind
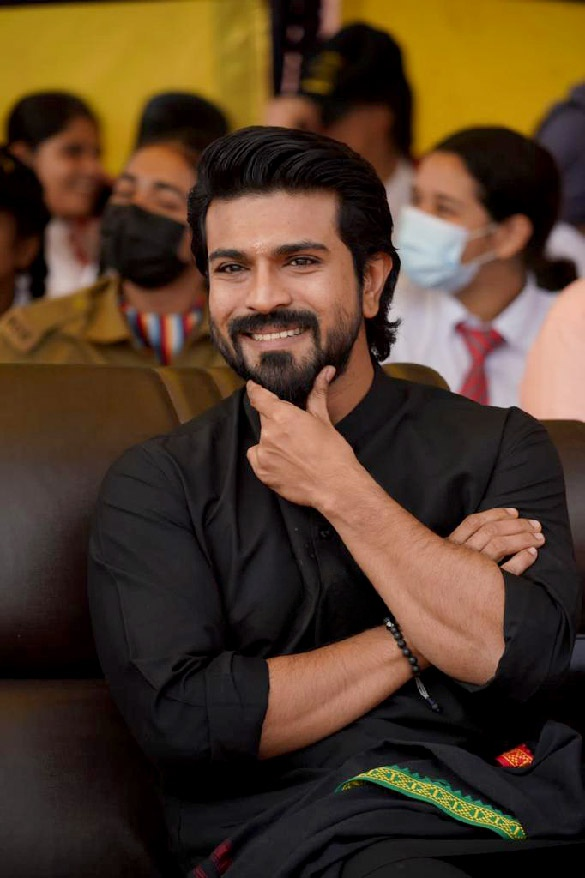
Ram Charan

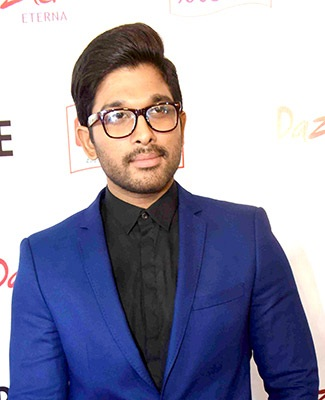
Allu Arjun

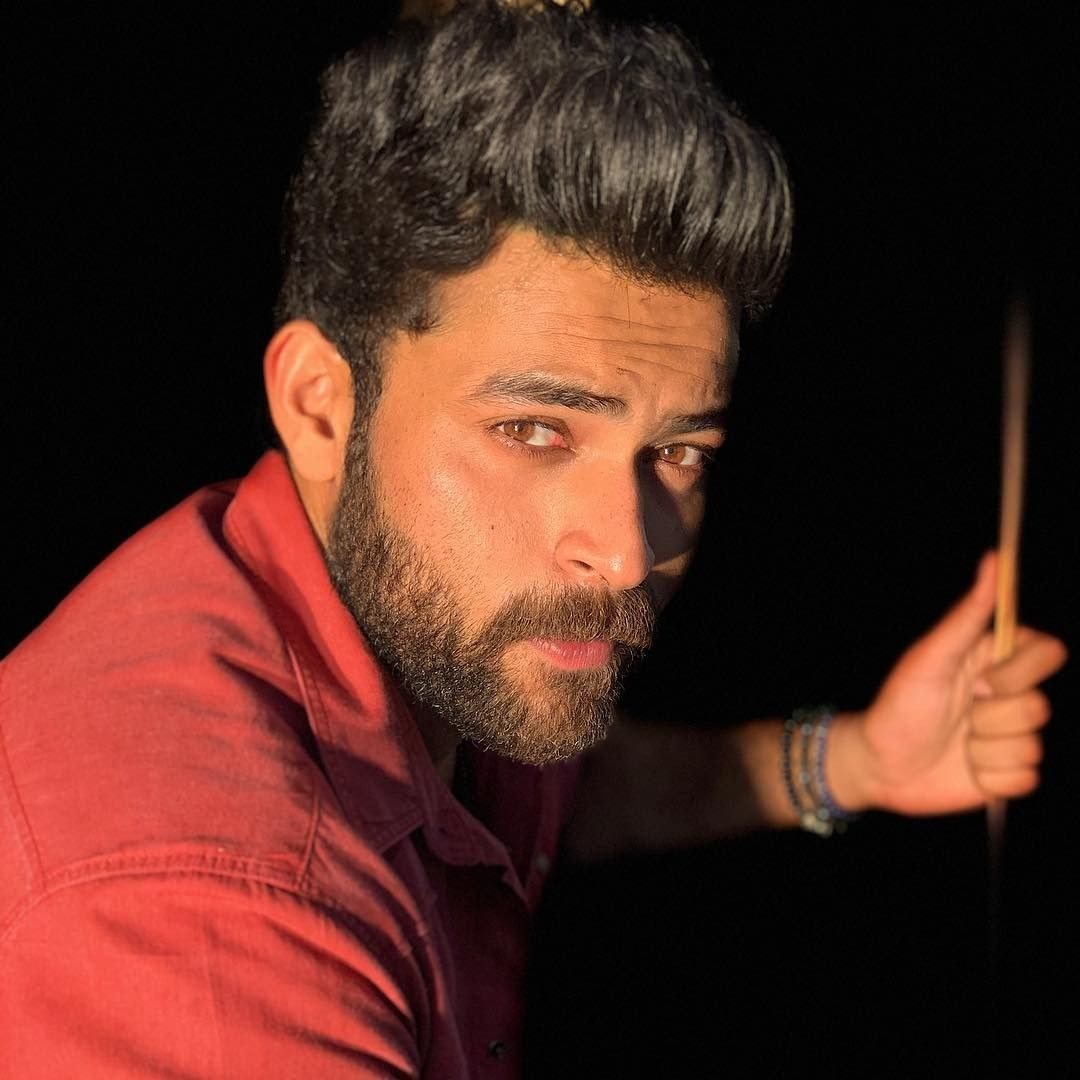
Varun Tej

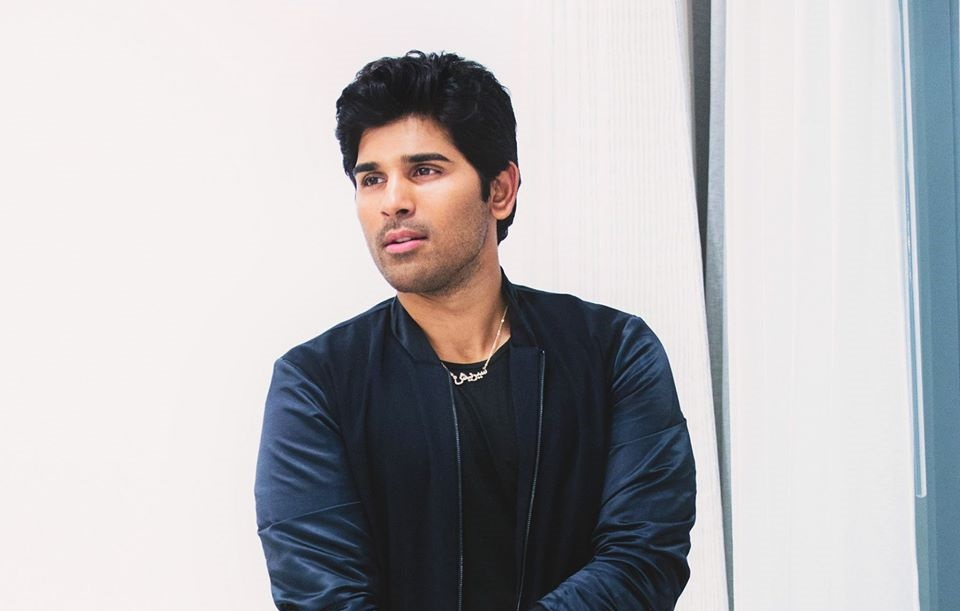
Allu Sirish

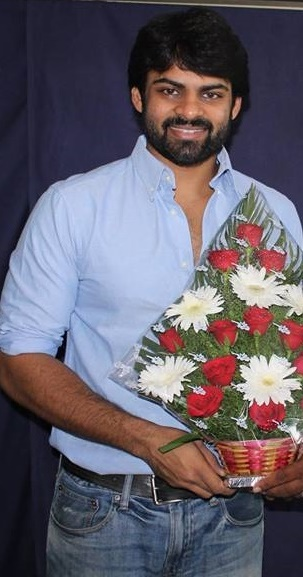
Sai Durgha Tej

=== Kottarakkara family ===
- Kottarakkara Sreedharan Nair, actor
- Sai Kumar, son of Kottarakkara
  - Prasannakumari, ex-wife of Saikumar
    - Vaishnavi Saikumar, daughter of Saikumar & Prasannakumari
  - Bindu Panicker, wife of Sai Kumar
- Shobha Mohan, daughter of Kottarakkara
    - Vinu Mohan, actor, Shobha's son
      - Vidhya Mohan, actress, Vinu's wife
    - Anu Mohan, actor, Shobha's son

=== Krish family ===
- Krish, playback singer.
- Sangeetha Krish, actress; wife of Krish.
  - Parimal, actor; brother of Sangeetha.
  - K. R. Balan, producer; grandfather of Sangeetha.

== L ==
=== Lakshminarayana family ===
- V. Lakshminarayana (d. 1990), musician
- L. Vaidyanathan (d. 2007), composer; son of Lakshminarayana
  - L. V. Ganesan, composer; son of Vaidyanathan
  - L. V. Muthukumarasamy, composer; son of Vaidyanathan
- L. Shankar, violinist; son of Lakshminarayana
- L. Subramaniam, violinist; son of Lakshminarayana
  - Viji Subramaniam (d. 1995), vocalist; wife of Subramaniam
  - Kavita Krishnamurthy, singer; wife of Subramaniam

=== Lokesh family ===
- Subbaiah Naidu, actor. (d. 1962).
- Lokesh, actor. (d. 2004).
- Girija Lokesh, actress; wife of Lokesh.
- Srujan Lokesh, actor and anchor.
- Pooja Lokesh, actress.

=== Lokesh (Mysore Lokesh) family ===
- Mysore Lokesh, actor
- Pavitra Lokesh, actress.
  - Suchendra Prasad, actor; ex-husband of Pavitra Lokesh.
  - Naresh, actor, husband of Pavitra Lokesh, son of Vijaya Nirmala (see Nidudavolu family)
- Adi Lokesh, actor

== M ==
=== M. G. Ramachandran (M.G.R.) Family ===
- M. G. Ramachandran, actor, politician, Former Chief Minister of Tamil Nadu
  - V. N. Janaki, actress; wife of M.G.R. and Former Chief Minister of Tamil Nadu
- M. G. Chakrapani, actor; brother of M.G.R.
- M. G. C. Sukumar, actor; son of Chakrapani
- Junior MGR, actor; grand-nephew of M.G.R.

=== Madhavan family ===
- O. Madhavan, stage actor
- Vijayakumari, actress, wife of O. Madhavan
- Sandhya Rajendran, actress, daughter of Madhavan and Vijayakumari
  - E.A. Rajendran, actor, husband of Sandhya
  - Divyadarsan R. Engoor, actor, son of Sandhya and Rajendran
- Mukesh, actor, son of Madhavan and Vijayakumari
  - Saritha, actress, ex-wife of Mukesh
    - Viji Chandrasekhar, actress, sister of Saritha.
    - Shravan Mukesh, actor, son of Mukesh and Saritha
  - Methil Devika, dancer, ex-wife of Mukesh

=== Mammootty family ===
- Mammootty (four time National Award winning actor and film producer, who has acted in films in six languages including Malayalam, Tamil, Telugu, Kannada, Hindi and English. He predominantly works in Malayalam cinema)
  - Ibrahim Kutty (actor - Brother of Mammootty)
  - Dulquer Salmaan (actor and producer, who has acted in films in four languages including Malayalam, Tamil, Telugu and Hindi. He predominantly works in Malayalam cinema. He is the younger son of Mammootty)
  - Maqbool Salmaan (actor – nephew of Mammootty (Son of Ibrahim Kutty))
  - Ashkar Saudan (actor – nephew of Mammootty)
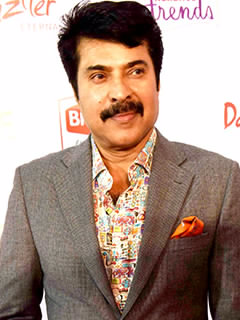
Mammootty

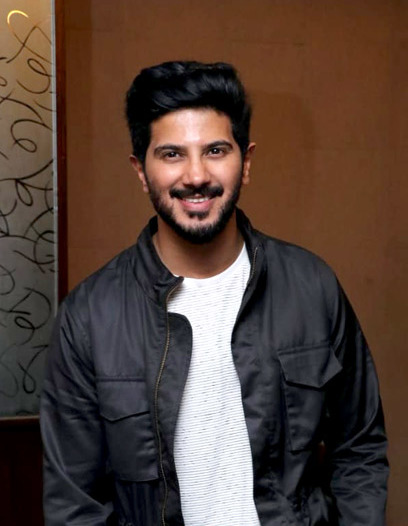
Dulquer Salmaan

=== Manchu family ===
- Mohan Babu, actor
- Lakshmi Manchu, actress, daughter of Mohan Babu
  - Andy Srinivasan, son-in-law of Mohan Babu
  - Vidya Nirvana Manchu Anand, daughter of Lakshmi Manchu and Andy Srinivasan
- Vishnu Manchu, actor, son of Mohan Babu
  - Viranica Reddy, wife of Manchu Vishnu
    - Ariana and Viviana, twin daughters of Manchu Vishnu and Viranica Reddy
    - Avram, son of Manchu Vishnu and Viranica Reddy
    - Ayra, daughter of Manchu Vishnu and Viranica Reddy
- Manchu Manoj, actor; son of Mohan Babu.

=== Mohan family ===
- Editor Mohan, editor.
- Mohan Raja, director; son of Mohan.
- Ravi Mohan, actor; son of Mohan.
- Pranav Mohan, actor; son of Raja.
- Aarav, actor; son of Ravi.
  - Aarti Ravi, costume designer; ex-wife of Ravi.
  - Sujatha Vijayakumar, producer; ex mother-in-law of Ravi.
- Keneeshaa Francis, singer; partner of Ravi Mohan.

=== Mohanlal-Balaji family ===
- Mohanlal, is a five time National Film Award winning Indian actor, film producer, playback singer, film distributor, and director who predominantly works in Malayalam film industry besides also having sporadically appeared in Tamil, Hindi, Telugu and Kannada films.
  - Pyarelal, actor; brother of mohanlal
  - Suchitra Mohanlal, producer; daughter of K. Balaji, wife of Mohanlal.
    - Pranav Mohanlal, actor; son of Mohanlal and Suchitra
    - Vismaya Mohanlal, Author, Actress; daughter of Mohanlal and Suchitra
    - K. Balaji, producer; father-in-law of Mohanlal.
      - Y. G. Parthasarathy, actor; brother-in-law of Balaji (see Rajinikanth family).
      - Suresh Balaje, producer; son of K. Balaji.
        - Sitara Suresh, producer; daughter of Suresh Balaje.

=== Murali family ===
- S. Siddalingaiah, director. (d.2015)
- Murali, actor; son of Siddalingaiah. (d.2010)
- Atharvaa, actor; son of Murali.
- Akash Murali, actor; son of Murali.
  - Sneha Britto, director; wife of Akash. (see Chandrasekhar family)
- S.D.Suresh, actor; producer; Film maker; younger brother of Murali.
- Daniel Balaji, cousin of Murali (d. 2025)

=== Muthuraman family ===
- R. Muthuraman, actor. (d. 1982)
- Karthik, actor; son of Muthuraman.
  - Ragini, actress; ex-wife of Karthik.
- Gautham Ram Karthik, actor; son of Karthik.
  - Manjima Mohan, actress; wife of Gautham.

== N ==
=== Nandamuri family ===
- N. T. Rama Rao popularly known as NTR, was a Telugu cinema actor, filmmaker and politician who served as Chief Minister of Andhra Pradesh over three terms. He is regarded as one of the most influential actors in Cinema of India
- Nandamuri Basavatarakam – wife of NTR
  - Nandamuri Harikrishna, actor and politician – 4th son of NTR
    - N. T. Rama Rao Jr., actor and popularly known as Jr. NTR – son of Nandamuri Harikrishna
    - Nandamuri Kalyan Ram, actor and producer – son of Nandamuri Harikrishna
  - Nandamuri Mohanakrishna, cinematographer – 5th son of NTR
    - Taraka Ratna, actor – son of Nandamuri Mohanakrishna
  - Nandamuri Balakrishna, actor and politician – 6th son of NTR
  - Daggubati Purandeswari, politician – 2nd daughter of NTR
    - Daggubati Venkateswara Rao, politician – husband of Daggubati Purandeswari
  - Nara Bhuvaneshwari, 3rd daughter of NTR
    - N. Chandrababu Naidu, Chief Minister of Andhra Pradesh– husband of Nara Bhuvaneshwari
      - Nara Lokesh, politician – son of Nara Chandrababu Naidu
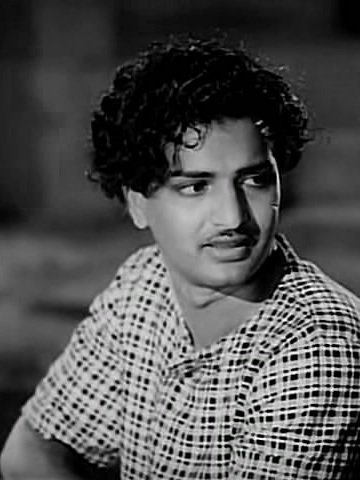
N. T. Rama Rao

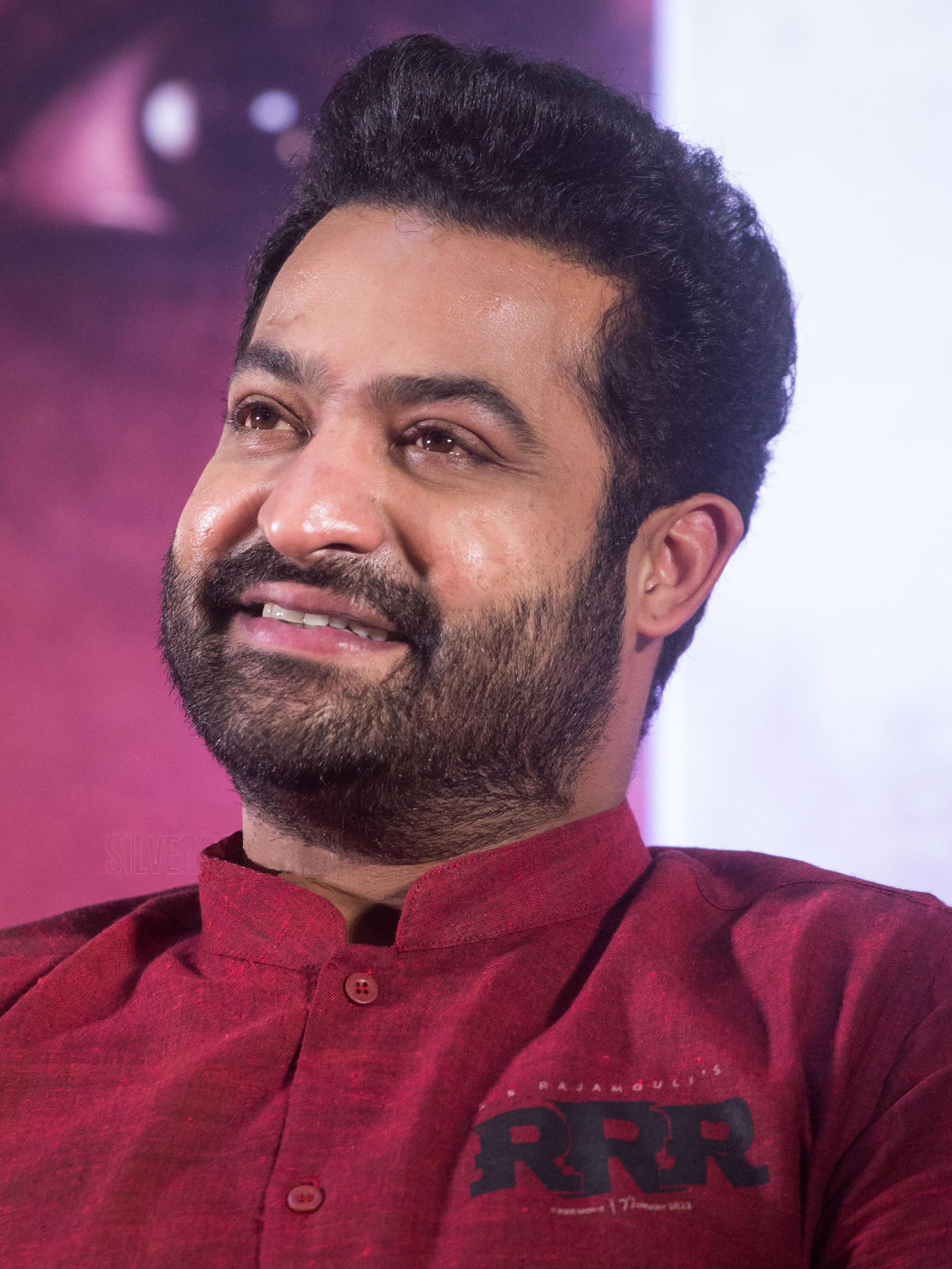
N. T. Rama Rao Jr.

=== N. N. Pillai family ===
- N. N. Pillai, Playwright, actor, theatre director, orator, screenplay writer, & lyricist. (d. 1995)
- Vijayaraghavan, actor; son of N.N. Pillai.

=== Nag family ===
- Anant Nag, actor and producer
  - Gayathri, actress and wife of Ananth Nag
- Shankar Nag, actor, director and producer, younger brother of Anant Nag
  - Arundathi Nag, actress, theater artist and wife of Shankar Nag
  - Padmavati Rao, sister of Arundhati Nag

=== Nagendra Rao family ===
- R. Nagendra Rao, actor (d. 1977).
- R. N. Jayagopal, director and poet (d. 2008); son of Nagendra Rao.
- R. N. K. Prasad, cinematographer and actor (d. 2012); son of Nagendra Rao.
- R. N. Sudarshan, actor (d. 2017); son of Nagendra Rao.
  - Shylashri, actress; wife of Sudharshan.

=== Nagesh family ===
- Nagesh, actor. (d. 2009)
- Anand Babu, actor; son of Nagesh.
- Bijesh, actor; son of Anand Babu.
- Gajesh, actor; son of Anand Babu.

=== Narayan family ===
- S. Narayan, actor and director.
  - Pankaj Narayan, actor; son of Narayan.

=== Nassar family ===
- Nassar, actor.
- Kameela Nassar, producer; wife of Nassar.
- Luthfudeen, actor; son of Nassar.
- Abi Mehdhi Hassan, actor; son of Nassar.

=== Naval family ===
- Simran, actress.
  - Deepak, actor; husband of Simran.
- Monal Naval, actress; sister of Simran (d. 2002)
- Jyothi Naval, actress; sister of Simran.

=== Nidudavolu family ===
  - Nidudavolu Venkatarao Indian littérateur
  - Jayasudha, actress, daughter of Nidudavolu Joga Bai, granddaughter of Nidudavolu Venkatarao, ex-wife of Vadde Ramesh's brother-in-law, Rajendra Prasad, widow of **Nitin Kapoor (see Kapoor family)
  - Nidadavolu Malathi, Indian littérateur, novelist, daughter of Jagannatha Rao
  - Subhashini, Telugu cine actress and sister of Jayasudha
  - Sarayu Rao, Hollywood actress, daughter of Nidadavolu Malathi and Velcheru Narayana Rao
  - Vijaya Nirmala, actress, aunt to Jayasudha, second wife of Krishna (see Ghattamaneni family)

== O ==
=== Om Prakash Rao family ===
- Om Prakash Rao, director.
  - Rekha Das, actress; former wife of Om Prakash Rao.
- Shravya Rao, daughter of Om Prakash Rao.

== P ==
=== Pandian family ===
- Durai Pandian, Film director
  - Divya, actress; elder daughter of Durai Pandian
  - Ramya Pandian, actress; second daughter of Durai Pandian
- Arun Pandian, actor
  - Kavitha Pandian, producer; daughter of Arun Pandian
    - Yuva Krishna, actor; ex-husband of Kavitha
  - Kirana Pandian, producer; daughter of Arun Pandian
  - Keerthi Pandiyan, actress; daughter of Arun Pandian
    - Ashok Selvan, actor; husband of Keerthi.
      - Abinaya Selvam, producer; sister of Ashok.
- Driya Pandian, actress; granddaughter of Arun Pandian

=== Panthulu family ===
- B. R. Panthulu, producer and director
- B. R. Vijayalakshmi, cinematographer and director; daughter of Panthulu
- B. R. Ravishankar, director; son of Panthulu

=== Parthiban family ===
- R. Parthiban, actor.
- Seetha, actress; ex-wife of Parthiban.
- P. S. Keerthana, actress; daughter of Parthiban.

=== Peethambaram family ===
- Peethambaram Nair, make-up man (d. 2011)
- P. Vasu, director; son of Peethambaram.
- Shakthi Vasudevan, actor; son of Vasu.
  - Ramu, make-up artiste; father-in-law of Vasu.
- Gautham V. R., director; grandson of Peethambaram.

=== Pinnisetty family ===
- Ravi Raja Pinisetty, director.
- Sathya Prabhas Pinisetty, director; son of Ravi Raja.
- Aadhi Pinisetty, actor; son of Ravi Raja.
  - Nikki Galrani, actress; wife of Aadhi.
    - Sanjjana, actress; sister of Nikki.

=== Pothineni family ===
- Ram Pothineni, actor.
- Sravanthi Ravi Kishore, producer; Uncle of Ram.
- Sharwanand, actor; Cousin of Ram.

=== Pudipeddi family ===
- P. J. Sarma, actor. (d. 2014).
- P. Sai Kumar, actor and voice actor.
  - Aadi Saikumar, actor; son of P. Sai Kumar.
- P. Ravi Shankar, actor and voice actor.
- Ayyappa P. Sharma, actor, director and voice actor

=== Priyadarshan Family ===
- Priyadarshan, Director.
- Lissy, Actress, Ex-wife of Priyadarshan.
- Kalyani Priyadarshan, Actress, Daughter of Lissy and Priyadarshan

== R ==
=== Radha family ===
- M. R. Radha, actor (d. 1979).
- M. R. R. Vasu, actor: son of M. R. Radha.
  - Vasu Vikram, actor; son of M. R. Vasu.
- Radha Ravi, actor; son of M. R. Radha, brother of Radhika.
  - Hari Radharavi, actor; son of Radharavi.
- Radikaa Sarathkumar, actress; daughter of M. R. Radha, and sister of Radharavi.
  - Rayanne, Granddaughter, daughter of Radhika Sarathkumar
  - Rahul Sarathkumar, Grandson, son of Radhika and Sarathkumar
  - R. Sarathkumar, actor; husband of Radhika
    - Varalaxmi Sarathkumar, actor; Daughter of SarathKumar
- Nirosha, actress; daughter of M. R. Radha.
  - Ramki, actor; husband of Nirosha.
- Ike Radha, director; grandson of M. R. Radha.
- Joshna Fernando, actress; niece of M. R. Radha.

=== Rahman family ===
- A. R. Rahman, music director.
- R. K. Shekhar, musician; Rahman's father.
- A. R. Reihana, playback singer; sister of Rahman.
- Israth Kadhiri, playback singer; sister of Rahman.
- G. V. Prakash Kumar, music composer and playback singer; son of Reihana.
  - Saindhavi, playback singer; ex-wife of Prakash.
- Khatija Rahman, playback singer; daughter of Rahman.
- A. R. Ameen, playback singer; son of Rahman.
- Azhar Kaashif, music composer; nephew of Rahman.
  - Rahman, actor; co-brother of Rahman.

=== Rajasekhar family ===
- Rajasekhar, actor
  - Jeevitha, actress; wife of Rajasekhar.
- Shivani Rajashekar, actress; daughter of Rajasekhar.
- Shivathmika Rajashekar, actress; daughter of Rajasekhar.
- Selva, actor; brother of Rajasekhar.
- Madhan, actor; nephew of Rajasekhar.

=== Rajendar family ===
- T. Rajendar, actor, director, music composer.
- Usha Rajendar, actress; wife of Rajendar.
- Silambarasan, actor; son of Rajendar.
- Kuralarasan, actor and music composer; son of Rajendar.
  - L. V. Muthukumarasamy, music composer; cousin of Silambarasan.

=== Rajendra Babu family ===
- D. Rajendra Babu, director (d. 2013)
  - Sumithra, actress; wife of Rajendra Babu.
- Uma Shankari, actress; daughter of Rajendra Babu
- Nakshathra, actress; daughter of Rajendra Babu

=== Rajesh family ===
- Rajesh, actor.
- Amarnath, actor; father of Rajesh.
- Sri Lakshmi, actress; sister of Rajesh.
- Aishwarya Rajesh, actress; daughter of Rajesh.
- Manikanda Rajesh, actor; son of Rajesh.

=== Rajinikanth family ===
- Rajinikanth (actor, producer and screenwriter)
- Latha Rajinikanth (film producer and playback singer – wife of Rajinikanth)
  - Aishwarya Rajinikanth (film producer and director – daughter of Rajinikanth)
    - Dhanush (actor) - ex-husband of Aishwarya, son of (see Kasthuri Raja family)
  - Soundarya Rajinikanth (graphic designer, film producer and director – daughter of Rajinikanth)
- Ravi Raghavendra (actor – father of Anirudh, brother-in-law of Rajinikanth)
  - Anirudh Ravichander (music director and playback singer – son of Ravi Raghavendra and nephew of Rajinikanth)
- Y. G. Mahendran (actor, dramatist, brother-in-law of Latha Rajinikanth)
  - Y. G. Madhuvanthi (actress, daughter of Y. G. Mahendra)
  - Vyjayanthimala (actress, cousin of Y. G. Mahendra)
- K. Balaji (producer, Y. G. Mahendra's uncle)
- Mohanlal (actor, son-in-law to K. Balaji)
  - Pranav Mohanlal (actor, son of Mohanlal)

=== Rajkumar family ===
- Dr. Rajkumar (d. 2006) (actor and singer)
- Parvathamma Rajkumar (d. 2017) (producer – wife of Rajkumar)
- S. P. Varadappa (actor and producer - younger brother of Dr Rajkumar)
  - Shiva Rajkumar (actor – son of Rajkumar)
  - Sarekoppa Bangarappa (politician) - father-in-law of Shiva Rajkumar
    - Kumar Bangarappa (actor and politician) - brother-in-law of Shiva Rajkumar
    - Madhu Bangarappa (politician) - brother-in-law of Shiva Rajkumar
  - Raghavendra Rajkumar (actor and producer – son of Rajkumar)
    - Vinay Rajkumar (actor – son of Raghavendra Rajkumar)
    - Yuva Rajkumar (actor – son of Raghavendra Rajkumar)
  - Puneeth Rajkumar (d. 2021) (actor and playback singer – son of Rajkumar)
  - Ramkumar (actor – son-in-law of Rajkumar)
    - Shringar Nagaraj (Actor - father of Ramkumar)
    - Dheeren Ramkumar (actor- son of Ramkumar)
    - Dhanya Ramkumar (actress - daughter of Ramkumar)
- S. A. Chinne Gowda (producer – brother of Parvathamma Rajkumar)
  - Vijay Raghavendra (actor – son of S. A. Chinne Gowda)
  - Sriimurali (actor – son of S. A. Chinne Gowda)
    - Prashanth Neel (director- brother-in-law of Sriimurali)
    - Aadarsh Balakrishna (Actor- cousin of Neel)
- S.A.Govindaraj (Producer- brother of Parvathamma Rajkumar)
- S.A.Srinivas (Producer - brother of Parvathamma Rajkumar )
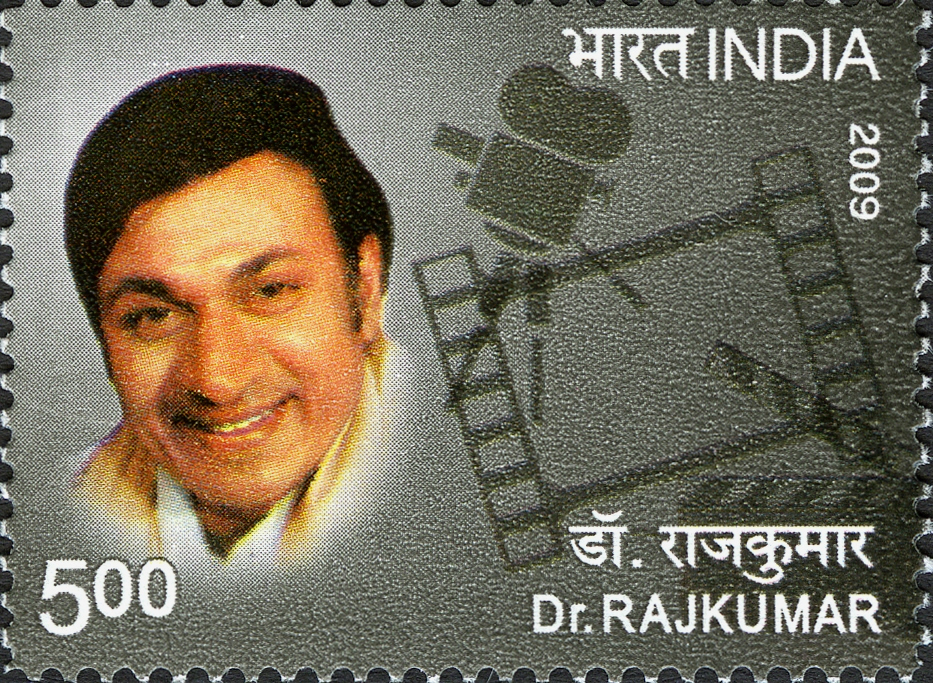
Dr. Rajkumar

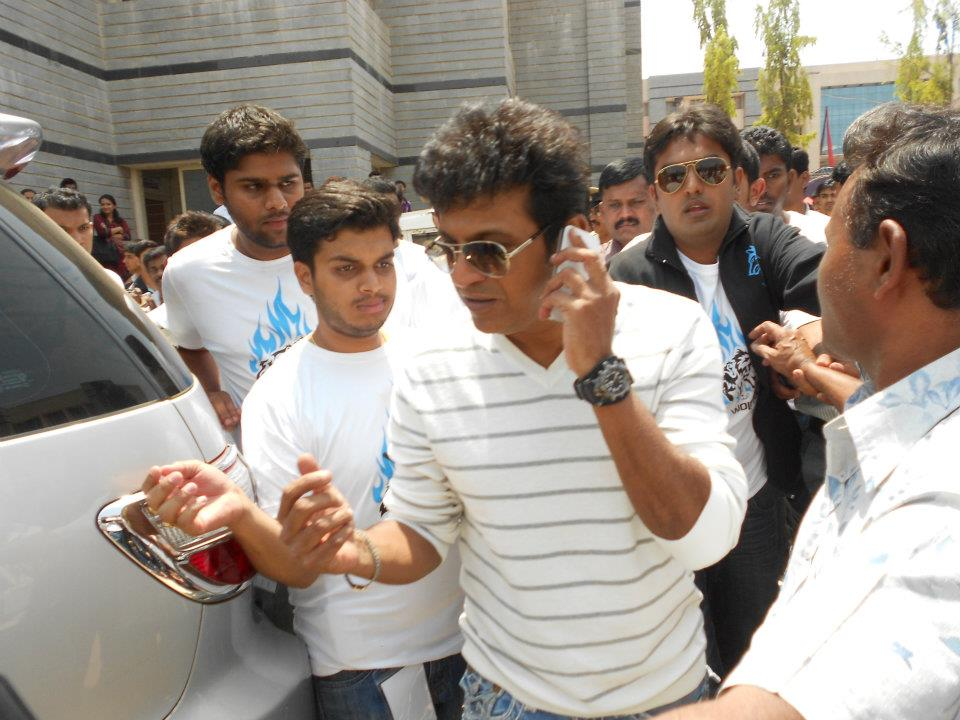
Shiva Rajkumar

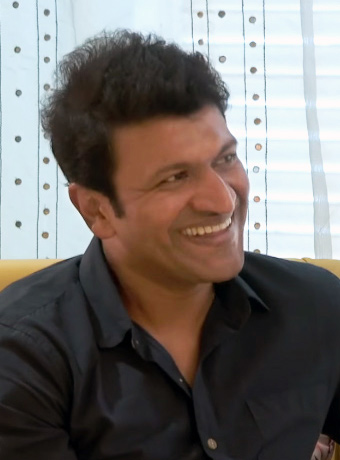
Puneeth Rajkumar

=== Rao family ===
- Y. V. Rao, producer.
  - Rajam, actress; first wife of Rao.
  - Kumari Rukmani, actress; second wife of Rao.
- Lakshmi, actress; daughter of Rao.
  - Mohan Sharma, actor; ex-husband of Lakshmi.
  - Sivachandran, actor; husband of Lakshmi.
- Aishwariyaa Bhaskaran, actress daughter of Lakshmi.

=== Rathnam family ===
- A. M. Rathnam, film producer.
- A. M. Jyothi Krishna, director; son of Rathnam.
- Ravi Krishna, actor; son of Rathnam.

=== Ravichandran family ===
- Ravichandran, actor.
- Sheela, actress; second wife of Ravichandran.
- Hamsavardhan, actor; son of Ravichandran.
  - Reshma, actress; wife of Hamsavardhan.
- George Vishnu, actor; son of Ravichandran and Sheela.
- Tanya Ravichandran, actress; granddaughter of Ravichandran.

=== Reddy, G. K. family ===
- G. K. Reddy, producer.
- Vikram Krishna, producer; son of Reddy.
  - Sriya Reddy, actress; wife of Vikram Krishna
- Vishal, actor; son of Reddy.
  - Sai Dhanshika, actor, would-be of Vishal

=== Reddy, Sameera family ===
- Sameera Reddy, actress.
- Meghna Reddy, actress; sister of Sameera.
- Sushama Reddy, actress; sister of Sameera.

== S ==
=== Sait Family ===
- Tanveer Sait: Politician from Bengaluru
  - Danish Sait: Host, Actor, Comedian; brother of Kubbra Sait and nephew of Tanveer Sait
  - Kubbra Sait: Actress, Sister of Danish Sait and niece of Tanveer Sait
- Talha Sait: Entrepreneur

=== Saluri family ===
- S. Rajeswara Rao, composer, multi instrumentalist, conductor singer-songwriter, actor, and music producer.
- Saluri Koteswara Rao, widely known as Koti, composer, multi instrumentalist, conductor singer-songwriter, actor, and music producer, son of S. Rajeswara Rao.
- Roshan Saluri, composer, singer-songwriter, actor, son of Saluri Koteswara Rao.

=== Sarja family ===
- Shakti Prasad, actor
  - Kishore Sarja, director; son of Shakti Prasad.
    - Aparna Kishore; wife of Kishore Sarja.
    - Suraj Sarja, musician; son of Kishore Sarja.
  - Arjun Sarja, actor; director; producer; son of Shakti Prasad.
    - Niveditha Arjun, actress; wife of Arjun Sarja.
      - Rajesh, actor; father of Niveditha.
      - Anu Prabhakar, actress; cousin sister of Niveditha
        - Gayatri Prabhakar, actress; mother of Anu.
        - Raghu Mukherjee, actor; husband of Anu.
        - Jayanthi, actress; ex-mother-in-law of Anu.
          - Peketi Sivaram, actor; ex-husband of Jayanthi. (see Thiagarajan family)
    - Aishwarya Arjun, actress; daughter of Arjun Sarja.
      - Umapathy Ramaiah, actor; husband of Aishwarya.
        - Thambi Ramaiah, director; father of Umapathy.
    - Anjana Arjun, producer; daughter of Arjun Sarja.
  - Bharat Sarja, actor; nephew of Arjun Sarja.
  - Pavan Teja, actor; nephew of Arjun Sarja.
  - Ammaji, daughter of Shakti Prasad.
    - Chiranjeevi Sarja, actor; son of Ammaji; grandson of Shakti Prasad.
      - Meghana Raj, actress; wife of Chiranjeevi Sarja.
        - Sundar Raj, actor; director; father of Meghana Raj.
        - Pramila Joshai, actor; producer; mother of Meghana Raj.
    - Dhruva Sarja, actor; son of Ammaji; grandson of Shakti Prasad.
      - Prerana Shankar; wife of Dhruva Sarja.

=== Sarovar Sanjeev family ===
- Sarovar Sanjeev Manjappa, producer; actor; business man;
  - Sudeepa, actor; director; producer; screenwriter; singer; television presenter; cricketer; son of Sarovar Sanjeev Rao and Saroja.
    - Priya Radhakrishna, producer, event management group business person; wife of Sudeep.
    - Sanchith Sanjeev, film director; nephew of Sudeep.

=== Sasi family ===
- I. V. Sasi, director.
- Seema, actress; wife of IV Sasi.
- Anu Sasi, actress; daughter of IV Sasi.
- Ani Sasi, director; son of IV Sasi.

=== Sathyaraj family ===
- Sathyaraj, actor.
  - Sibi Sathyaraj, film actor; son of Sathyaraj.
- Mathampatti Sivakumar, producer; brother of Sathyaraj.
  - Sathyan, actor; nephew of Sathyaraj ; son of Mathampatti Sivakumar.

=== Satyanarayana family ===
- E. V. V. Satyanarayana, director. (d. 2011)
- Allari Naresh, actor; son of Satyanarayana.
- Aryan Rajesh, actor; son of Satyanarayana.
- E. Satti Babu, director; cousin of Satyanarayana.

=== Sekhar family ===
- Pattiyal Sekhar, producer.
- Vishnuvardhan, director; son of Sekhar
  - Anu Vardhan, costume designer; wife of Vishnuvardhan.
    - N. S. Krishnan, actor; grandfather of Anu Vardhan.
    - T. A. Mathuram, actress; wife of Krishnan.
    - Ramya NSK, singer; granddaughter of Krishnan.
      - K. R. Ramasamy, actor; grandfather of Ramya.
- Krishna, actor; son of Sekhar.

=== Siddique family ===
- Siddique; actor and producer
- Shaheen Siddique; son of Siddique; actor

=== Sivaji Ganesan family ===
- Sivaji Ganesan, actor (d. 2001).
- Ramkumar Ganesan, producer; son of Sivaji.
- Prabhu, actor; son of Sivaji Ganesan.
- Dushyanth Ramkumar, actor and producer; son of Ramkumar.
- Shivaji Dev, actor; son of Ramkumar.
- Vikram Prabhu, actor; son of Prabhu
- Dharan Mandrayar, director; nephew of Sivaji.

=== Sivakumar family ===
- Sivakumar, actor.
- Suriya, actor; elder son of Sivakumar.
  - Jyothika, actress; wife of Suriya.
    - Nagma, actress; half-sister of Jyothika.
    - Roshini, actress; sister of Jyothika.
- Karthi, actor; younger son of Sivakumar.
- Brindha Sivakumar, singer; daughter of Sivakumar
  - K. E. Gnanavel Raja, producer; nephew of Sivakumar.
  - S. R. Prabhu, producer; nephew of Sivakumar.

=== Singh Babu family ===
- D. Shankar Singh, director
- Prathima Devi, actress; wife of Shankar Singh
  - Rajendra Singh Babu, director; son of Shankar Singh and Prathima Devi
    - Aditya, actor; son of Rajendra Singh
    - Rishika Singh, actress; daughter of Rajendra Singh
- Vijayalakshmi Singh, director; sister of Rajendra Singh
  - Jai Jagadish, actor; husband of Vijayalakshmi Singh

=== Sreenivasan family ===
- Sreenivasan, actor, screenwriter, director.
  - Vineeth Sreenivasan, singer, actor, screenwriter, director; son of Sreenivasan.
    - Divya Vineeth, singer; wife of Vineeth Sreenivasan
  - Dhyan Sreenivasan, actor, screenwriter, director; son of Sreenivasan.
- M. Mohanan, director; brother-in-law of Sreenivasan.
- Rakesh Mantodi, screenwriter; nephew of Sreenivasan.

=== Sridevi family ===
As the family of Sridevi have primarily appeared in Hindi films, only those who have appeared in South Indian films are listed below:

- Sridevi, actress
  - Boney Kapoor, film producer; husband of Sridevi
- Janhvi Kapoor, actress; daughter of Sridevi
- Khushi Kapoor, actress; daughter of Sridevi
- Sanjay Ramasamy, politician; husband of Sridevi's sister
  - Maheswari, actress; niece of Sridevi.
  - Avishek Karthik, actor; nephew of Sridevi.

=== SS Rajendran family ===
- S. S. Rajendran, actor.
  - C. R. Vijayakumari, actress; wife of SS Rajendran.
- S. S. Rajendra Kumar, actor; son of Rajendran.
- S. S. R. Kannan, actor; son of Rajendran.
- S. S. R. Pankaj Kumar, actor; grandson of Rajendran.

=== Subramanyam family ===
- K. Subramanyam, director (d.1971)
- S. D. Subbulakshmi, actress; wife of Subramanyam.
- S. Krishnaswamy, director; son of Subramanyam.
- S. V. Ramanan, director; son of Subramanyam.
  - Lakshmi Ravichander, wife of Ravi Raghavendra
    - Anirudh Ravichander, music director; son of Ravi and Lakshmi. (see Rajinikanth family)
    - Hrishikesh, actor; grandson of Ramanan. (see Rajinikanth family)
- Padma Subrahmanyam, dancer; daughter of Subramanyam.
- Raghuram, choreographer; grandson of Subrahmanyam.
- Girija Raghuram, choreographer; wife of Raghuram.
  - Jayanthi, actress; sister of Girija.
  - Brinda Master, choreographer; sister of Girija.
  - Kala Master, choreographer; sister of Girija.
    - Prasanna Sujit, choreographer; nephew of Kala.
    - Keerthi Shanthanu, video jockey; niece of Kala. (see Bhagyaraj family)
  - Sneha, actress; former sister-in-law of Kala.
  - Prasanna, actor; husband of Sneha.
- Suja Manoj, actress; daughter of Raguram.
- Gayathri Raguram, actress; daughter of Raguram.

=== Sukumaran family ===
- Sukumaran, actor (d. 1997)
- Mallika Sukumaran, actress; wife of Sukumaran.
    - Indrajith, actor; son of Sukumaran.
      - Poornima Indrajith, actress; wife of Indrajith.
        - Prarthana Indrajith, playback singer; daughter of Indrajith and Poornima.
        - Nakshatra Indrajith, child artist; daughter of Indrajith and Poornima.
    - Prithviraj Sukumaran, actor, director, producer; son of Sukumaran.
      - Supriya Menon, BBC India Reporter, producer; wife of Prithviraj.
        - Alankritha Menon Prithviraj, only daughter of Prithviraj and Supriya.

=== Sundar family ===
- Sundar C, director.
- Khushbu Sundar, actress; wife of Sundar.
  - Abdullah, actor; brother of Kushboo.
  - Ramya Raj, actress; sister of Kushboo's sister-in-law.

=== Sundaram family ===
- Mugur Sundar, choreographer.
- Raju Sundaram, choreographer; son of Sundaram.
- Prabhu Deva, actor and director; son of Sundaram.
  - Vishnu Deva, choreographer; nephew of Prabhu Deva
- Nagendra Prasad, choreographer; son of Sundaram.

=== Suresh family ===
- G. Suresh Kumar, Actor, Producer.
- Menaka, Actress, Producer, wife of G. Suresh Kumar.
  - Revathy Suresh, Director, Producer, Creative Director, Elder daughter of G. Suresh Kumar, Wife of Nithin Mohan.
  - Keerthy Suresh, Actress, Younger daughter of G. Suresh Kumar, Wife of Antony Thattil.

=== Suresh Gopi family ===
- Suresh Gopi, actor.
  - Gokul Suresh, actor; son of Suresh Gopi.
  - Madhav Suresh, actor & younger son of Suresh Gopi.

=== Susarla family ===
- Susarla Dakshinamurthi Sastry Sr. composer, multi instrumentalist, conductor singer-songwriter, and music producer.
- Susarla Krishna Brahma Sastry composer, multi instrumentalist, conductor singer-songwriter, and music producer, son of Susarla Dakshinamurthi Sr.
- Susarla Dakshinamurthi Sastry Jr. composer, multi instrumentalist, conductor singer-songwriter, and music producer, son of Susarla Krishna Brahma Sastry.

== T ==
=== Thiagarajan family ===
- Thiagarajan, actor.
- Prashanth, actor; son of Thiagarajan.
  - Peketi Sivaram, actor; father-in-law of Thiagarajan.
  - Jayanthi, actress; ex-wife of Sivaram. (see Sarja family)
- Vikram, actor; nephew of Thiagarajan.
- Arvind Victor John, actor; brother of Vikram.
  - Vinod Raj, actor; father of Vikram.
  - Akshita Vikram, playback singer; daughter of Vikram. (see Karunanidi family)
  - Dhruv Vikram, actor; playback singer; son of Vikram.
  - Arjuman, actor; nephew of Vikram.

=== Thoogudeepa family ===
- Thoogudeepa Srinivas, actor. (d. 1995)
- Darshan, actor; son of Srinivas
- Dinakar Thoogudeepa, director; son of Srinivas.
- Meena Thoogudeepa Srinivas, producer; wife of Thoogudeepa Srinivas
- Manasa Dinkar, Director; wife of Dinakar Thoogudeepa

=== Travancore Sisters family ===
- Lalitha, actress; part of the Travancore Sisters
- Padmini, actress; part of the Travancore Sisters
- Ragini, actress; part of the Travancore Sisters
- P. K. Sathyapal (Baby), producer; cousin of the Travancore Sisters
- Kumari Thankam, actress; (Wife of P. K. Sathyapal)
- Latika Suresh, producer; (Daughter of Raveendran Nair) - cousin of Travancore Sisters
- Shobana, actress; niece of the Travancore Sisters
- Vineeth, actor; nephew of Padmini and Travancore Sisters
- Krishna, actor; grandson of Lalitha
- Ambika Sukumaran, actress; cousin of the Travancore Sisters
- Sukumari, actress; cousin of the Travancore Sisters (d. 2013)
- A. Bhimsingh, director; husband of Sukumari (d. 1978)
- B. Lenin, editor; son of Bhimsingh (but not of Sukumari)
- B. Kannan, cinematographer; son of Bhimsingh (but not of Sukumari)
- Suresh Bhimsingh, actor; son of Bhimsingh and Sukumari

=== Thotakura family ===
- T. V. Raju composer, multi instrumentalist, conductor singer-songwriter, actor, and music producer.
- Thotakura Somaraju widely known as Raj–Koti, composer, multi instrumentalist, conductor singer-songwriter, actor, and music producer, son of T. V. Raju.

== U ==
=== Uppalapati family ===
- Krishnam Raju (actor, film producer and politician)
- Uppalapati Surya Narayana Raju (film producer; father of Prabhas and younger brother of Krishnam Raju)
- Prabhas (actor; son of Surya Narayana Raju and nephew of Krishnam Raju)
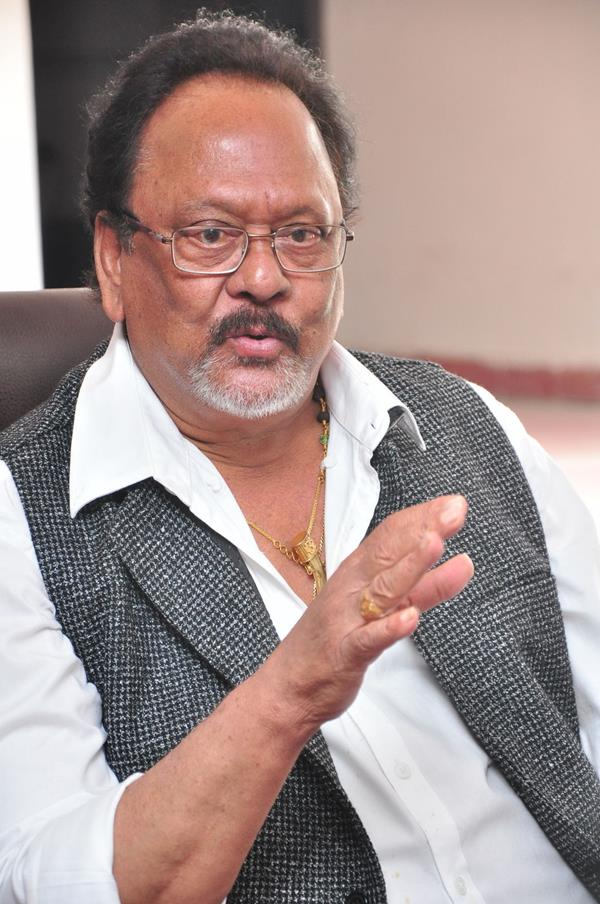
Krishnam Raju

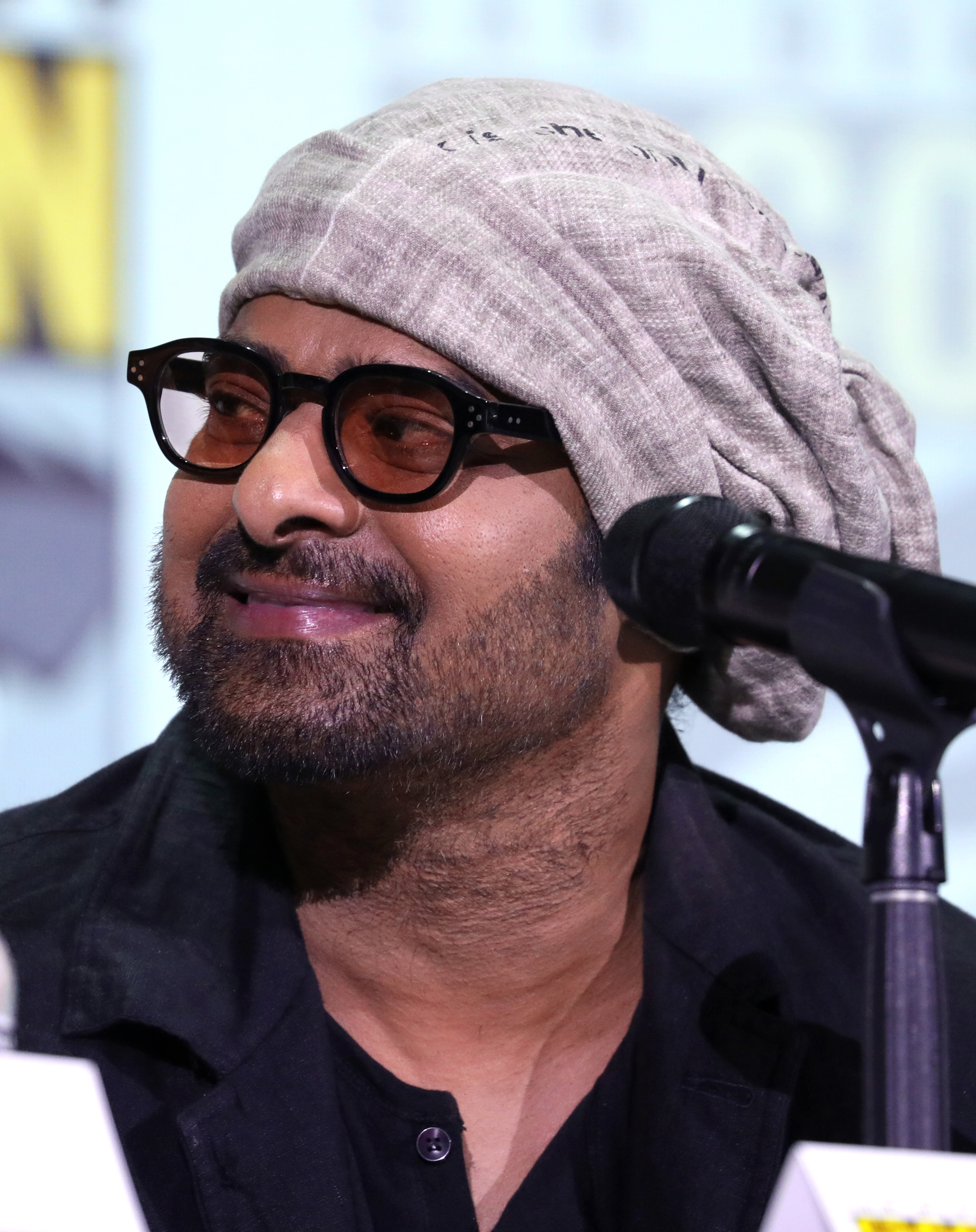
Prabhas

== V ==
=== Vairamuthu family ===
- Vairamuthu, poet.
- Madhan Karky, poet; son of Vairamuthu.
- Kabilan Vairamuthu, poet; son of Vairamuthu.

=== Vasudevan family ===
- Malaysia Vasudevan, playback singer. (d. 2011)
- Yugendran, actor; son of Vasudevan.
  - Hema Malini Yugendran, TV host; wife of Yugendran.
- Prashanthini, playback singer; daughter of Vasudevan.

=== Vedantham family ===
- Vedantam Raghavayya, actor.
- Suryaprabha, actress; wife of Raghavayya.
- Vedantam Ramu, dancer; son of Raghavayya.
- Shubha, actress; daughter of Raghavayya.
  - Pushpavalli, actress; sister of Suryaprabha.
    - Gemini Ganesan, actor; husband of Pushpavalli. (see Gemini Ganesan family)
  - Rekha, actress; daughter of Pushpavalli.

=== Veeraswamy family ===
- N. Veeraswamy, producer. (d. 1992)
  - Ravichandran, actor, director and music composer; son of Veeraswamy.
    - Manoranjan Ravichandran, actor; son of Ravichandran.
    - Vikram Ravichandran, actor; son of Ravichandran.

=== Vijayakanth family ===
- Vijayakanth, actor.
- Premalatha Vijayakanth|Premalatha, producer; wife of Vijayakanth.
- Shanmuga Pandian, actor; son of Vijayakanth.
- Vijay Prabhakaran, son of Vijayakanth.

=== Vijayakumar family ===
- Vijayakumar, actor.
- Manjula Vijayakumar, actress. (d. 2013)
- Arun Vijay, actor; son of Vijayakumar.
  - N. S. Mohan, producer; father-in-law of Arun.
  - Hemanth, actor; son of Mohan.
- Kavitha Vijayakumar, actress; daughter of Vijayakumar.
- Vanitha Vijayakumar, actress; daughter of Vijayakumar.
  - Akash, actor; ex-husband of Vanitha.
  - Robert, choreographer; ex-partner of Vanitha.
  - Peter Paul, visual effects director; ex-husband of Vanitha
    - Alphonsa, actress; sister of Robert.
- Pritha Hari, actress; daughter of Vijayakumar.
  - Hari, director; husband of Preetha.
- Sridevi Vijayakumar, actress; daughter of Vijayakumar.
- Arnav Vijay, actor; son of Arun Vijay.
- Jovika Vijayakumar, reality television contestant; daughter of Vanitha.
  - Sanjeev, actor; nephew of Manjula Vijayakumar.
  - Preethi, actress; wife of Sanjeev.
  - Sindhu, actress; niece of Manjula Vijayakumar. (d. 2005)
    - Rishi, actor; husband of Sindhu.
    - Raghuveer, actor; ex-husband of Sindhu. (d. 2014)

=== Vishnuvardhan family ===
- Vishnuvardhan, actor.
  - Bharathi Vishnuvardhan, actress; wife of Vishnuvardhan .
  - Keerthi Vishnuvardhan, costume designer; daughter Of Vishnuvardhan.
  - Aniruddha Jatkar, actor; son-in-law of Vishnuvardhan.

=== Vyjayanthimala family ===
- Vyjayanthimala, actress.
- Vasunthara Devi, actress; mother of Vyjayanthimala.
- Suchindra Bali, actor; son of Vyjayanthimala.
  - Y. G. Mahendran, actor; cousin of Vyjayanthimala. (see Rajinikanth family)

== See also ==
- List of Indian music families
