= Thudakkam =

2026 film by Jude Anthany Joseph

Thudakkam (2026)
- Theatrical release poster
- Directed by: Jude Anthany Joseph
- Screenplay by: Jude Anthany Joseph; Akhil Krishna; Linish Nellikkal
- Story by: Linish Nellikkal
- Produced by: Antony Perumbavoor
- Starring: Vismaya Mohanlal; Mohanlal; Ashish Joe Antony
- Cinematography: Jomon T. John; Akhil George; Additional cinematography: Sudeep Elamon
- Edited by: Chaman Chakko
- Music by: Jakes Bejoy
- Production company: Aashirvad Cinemas
- Distributed by: Aashirvad Cinemas
- Release date: 7 August 2026
- Running time: 137 minutes
- Country: India
- Language: Malayalam
- Box office: ₹45 crore

Thudakkam (transl. Beginning) is a 2026 Indian Malayalam-language martial arts drama film directed by Jude Anthany Joseph, who also wrote the screenplay with Akhil Krishna and Linish Nellikkal. It was produced by Antony Perumbavoor through Aashirvad Cinemas. The film stars Vismaya Mohanlal, Ashish Joe Antony, Bobby Kurian, Sai Kumar, Manoj K. Jayan, K. B. Ganesh Kumar, Miya George, Chippy Renjith, Kottayam Ramesh, and Jaffar Idukki alongside Mohanlal in a special cameo appearance. The music was composed by Jakes Bejoy, with cinematography by Jomon T. John and editing by Chaman Chakko.

The film was officially launched with a pooja ceremony on 30 October 2025. Principal photography began on 17 November 2025 and was completed on 20 February 2026. The film was shot in locations including Bengaluru, Kuttikkanam and Kochi. Released on August 7, the film received mixed reviews from critics and audiences and went on to became a commercial success.

== Cast ==
- Vismaya Mohanlal as Meenu (voiceover by Adithya Lakshmi)
  - Vagmi Patteri as Childhood Meenu
  - Vaiga Nandan as Young Meenu
- Mohanlal as John Aashan, Meenu's martial arts master (cameo)
- Ashish Joe Antony as Jithu, a contract killer
- Bobby Kurian as Esthappan
- Sai Kumar as Village Officer Ravi Balachandran, Meenu's father
- Manoj K. Jayan as CI Satheesh Kumar
- K. B. Ganesh Kumar as Mahadevan, Ravi's client
- Chippy Renjith as Meenu's mother and Ravi's wife
- Kottayam Ramesh as Joseph Mash, Ravi's neighbour and Esthappan's elder brother
- Jaya Kurup as Mary Teacher, Joseph Mash's wife
- Essa Maria Edison as Chinnu, Meenu's friend and neighbour
- Messi (Dog) as Messi, Meenu's pet
- Jaffar Idukki as SCPO Vijayan
- T. G. Ravi as autorickshaw driver
- Miya George as Chinnu's school teacher
- Jibin Gopinath as CPO Biju Dev
- Adithya Lakshmi as Priya, Meenu's friend
- Reshmi Boban as Siya and Miya's mother
- Jaise Jose as Mahadevan's friend
- Sijoy Varghese as Chinnu's school teacher's husband
- Dinesh Prabhakar as CPO Dileep
- Pauly Valsan as Pauly Chechi
- Prem Prakash as Victim Girl's father
- Lali Marakkar as Victim Girl's mother
- Jayakumar Parameswaran Pillai as Tahsildar
- Nilja K Baby as Sariga, autorickshaw driver's daughter
- Sivadas Kannur as Police Constable
- Gilu Joseph as CPO Sindhu
- Aswin Vijayan as Kukku, Sariga's boyfriend
- Shanavas Shanu as Sub Inspector of Police
- Thushara Pillai as Priya's mother
- Vijaykumar Prabhakaran as SI Pradeep Chandran
- Antony Perumbavoor as Antony's cafe owner

== Production ==
=== Development ===
The film was announced in 2025, with Antony Perumbavoor producing through Aashirvad Cinemas. The screenplay was written by Jude Anthany Joseph along with Akhil Krishna and Linish Nellikkal. The film was officially launched with a pooja ceremony on 30 October 2025 in Kochi, attended by members of the cast and crew.

=== Filming ===
Principal photography began on 17 November 2025. The film was shot in locations including Bengaluru, Coimbatore, Kuttikkanam and Kochi. Cinematography was handled by Jomon T. John, with editing by Chaman Chakko and music composed by Jakes Bejoy. Filming concluded on 20 February 2026.

== Marketing ==
The marketing of Thudakkam began with the release of the first-look poster on 12 January 2026. Further promotional updates related to the film were released in the following months ahead of its scheduled release.

== Music ==
The music and original background score for Thudakkam are composed by Jakes Bejoy.

== Release ==
Thudakkam released on 7 August 2026, during the Onam festival season. The film was distributed by Aashirvad Cinemas.

Home Media

The film’s post-theatrical streaming rights have been acquired by JioHotstar. The film premiered on 18 September 2026.
