= List of members of the 7th Lok Sabha =

Members of Lok Sabha (1980-84)

This is a list of members of the 7th Lok Sabha arranged by state or territory represented. These members of the lower house of the Indian Parliament were elected to the 7th Lok Sabha (1980 to 1984) at the 1980 Indian general election.

== Andhra Pradesh (42) ==
INC(I) (42) INC(U) (1)

No.	Constituency	Member of Parliament	Party affiliation	Roles and responsibilities
1	Srikakulam	Rajagopala Rao Boddepalli	Indian National Congress (Indira)	
2	Parvathipuram (ST)	K. C. Suryanarayana Deo Vyrichearla	Indian National Congress (Urs)	
3	Bobbili	P. V. Gajapathi Raju	Indian National Congress (Indira)	
4	Visakhapatnam	Appalaswamy Kommuru	Indian National Congress (Indira)	
5	Bhadrachalam (ST)	B. Radhabai Ananda Rao	Indian National Congress (Indira)	
6	Anakapalli	Appala Naidu S. R. A. S.	Indian National Congress (Indira)	
7	Kakinada	Sanjeevi Rao M. S.	Indian National Congress (Indira)	Dy. Minister in the Dept. of Electronics (Jan 1982–Oct 1984); Dy. Minister in the Ministry of Civil Supplies (July 1983–Oct 1984); Dy. Minister in the Dept. of Electronics (Nov 1984–Dec 1984)
8	Rajahmundry	S. B. P. Pattabhi Rama Rao	Indian National Congress (Indira)	MoS in the Ministry of Finance (Sept 1982–February 1984).; MoS in the Ministry of Industry (February 1984–Oct 1984).; MoS in the Ministry of Industry (Nov 1984–Dec 1984).
9	Amalapuram (SC)	Kusuma Krishnamurthi	Indian National Congress (Indira)	
10	Narasapur	Alluri Subhas Chandra Bose	Indian National Congress (Indira)	
11	Eluru	Chittoori Subbarao Chowdary	Indian National Congress (Indira)	
12	Machilipatnam	Ankineedu Maganti	Indian National Congress (Indira)	
13	Vijayawada	Vidya Chennupati	Indian National Congress (Indira)	
14	Tenali	Meduri Nageswara Rao	Indian National Congress (Indira)	
15	Guntur	N. G. Ranga	Indian National Congress (Indira)	
16	Bapatla	Ankineedu Prasada Rao Pamulapati	Indian National Congress (Indira)	
17	Narasaraopet	K. Brahmananda Reddy	Indian National Congress (Indira)	
18	Ongole	Venkata Reddi Puli	Indian National Congress (Indira)	
19	Nellore (SC)	D. Kamakshaiah	Indian National Congress (Indira)	
20	Tirupati (SC)	Pasala Penchalaiah	Indian National Congress (Indira)	
21	Chittoor	P. Rajagopal Naidu	Indian National Congress (Indira)	
22	Rajampet	P. Parthasarathy	Indian National Congress (Indira)	
23	Cuddapah	K. Obul Reddy	Indian National Congress (Indira)	
24	Hindupur	P. Bayapa Reddy	Indian National Congress (Indira)	
25	Anantapur	Darur Pullaiah	Indian National Congress (Indira)	
26	Kurnool	K. Vijaya Bhaskara Reddy	Indian National Congress (Indira)	Minister of Shipping and Transport (Feb 1983– Sept 1984); Minister of Industry (Sept 1984–Oct 1984); Minister of Industry and Company Affairs (Nov 1984–Dec 1984)
27	Nandyal	P. Venkatasubbaiah	Indian National Congress (Indira)	MoS in the Ministry of Home Affairs (Jan 1980–Oct 1984).; MoS in the Ministry of Parliamentary Affairs (Jan 1980–Sept 1982).; MoS in the Ministry of Home Affairs (Nov 1984–Dec 1984).
28	Nagarkurnool (SC)	Anantharamulu Mallu	Indian National Congress (Indira)	
29	Mahabubnagar	Mallikarjun	Indian National Congress (Indira)	Dy. Minister in the Ministry of Railways (June 1980–Jan 1983); Dy. Minister in the Ministry of Works and Housing (Jan 1982–Oct 1984) & (Nov 1984–Dec 1984); Dy. Minister in the Ministry of Sports (Jan 1982–Oct 1984) & (Nov 1984–Dec 1984); Dy. Minister in the Dept. of Parliamentary Affairs (Jan 1982–Oct 1984) & (Nov 1984–Dec 1984)
30	Hyderabad	K. S. Narayana	Indian National Congress (Indira)	
31	Secunderabad	P. Shiv Shankar	Indian National Congress (Indira)	Minister of Law, Justice and Company Affairs (Jan 1980–Jan 1982); Minister of Petroleum and Chemicals (Jan 1982–Sept 1982); Minister of Energy (Sept 1982–Oct 1984); Minister of Energy (Oct 1984–Dec 1984)
32	Siddipet (SC)	Nandi Yellaiah	Indian National Congress (Indira)	
33	Medak	Indira Gandhi	Indian National Congress (Indira)	Prime Minister of India (14 Jan 1980 - 31 Oct 1984)
34	Nizamabad	M. Ramgopal Reddy	Indian National Congress (Indira)	
35	Adilabad	G. Narasimha Reddy	Indian National Congress (Indira)	
36	Peddapalli (SC)	K. Rajamallu	Indian National Congress (Indira)	
37	Karimnagar	M. Satyanarayana Rao	Indian National Congress (Indira)	
38	Hanamkonda	P. V. Narasimha Rao	Indian National Congress (Indira)	Minister of External Affairs (Jan 1980–July 1984); Minister of Home Affairs (July 1984–Oct 1984) & (Oct 1984–Dec 1984); Minister of Planning (Nov 1984–Dec 1984)
39	Warangal	Md. Kamaloddin Ahmed	Indian National Congress (Indira)	
40	Khammam	Kondala Rao Jalagam	Indian National Congress (Indira)	
41	Nalgonda	T. Damodar Reddy	Indian National Congress (Indira)	
42	Miryalguda	G. S. Reddy	Indian National Congress (Indira)	

== Arunachal Pradesh (2) ==
INC(I) (2)

No.	Constituency	Member of Parliament	Party affiliation	Roles and responsibilities
1	Arunachal West	Prem Khandu Thungon	Indian National Congress (Indira)	Dy. Minister in the Ministry of Supply and Rehabilitation (June 8, 1980 - Jan 15, 1982); Dy. Minister in the Ministries of Education, Culture and Social Welfare (Nov 4, 1984 - Dec 31, 1984)
2	Arunachal East	Sobeng Tayeng	Indian National Congress (Indira)	

== Assam (2) ==
No.	Constituency	Member of Parliament	Party affiliation	Roles and responsibilities
1	Karimganj (SC)	Nihar Ranjan Laskar	Indian National Congress (Indira)	MoS in the Ministry of Health & Family Welfare (Jan 14, 1980 - Jan 15, 1982).; MoS in the Ministry of Home Affairs (Jan 15, 1982 - Feb 7, 1984).; MoS in the Ministry of Commerce (Feb 7, 1984 - Sept 7, 1984).; MoS in the Ministry of Industry (Sept 7, 1984 - Oct 31, 1984). & (Nov 12, 1984 - Dec 31, 1984)
2	Silchar	Santosh Mohan Dev (Rana Dev)	Indian National Congress (Indira)	

== Bihar (54) ==
INC(I) (33) INC(U) (5) CPI (4) JP (7) JP(S) (5) JKD (1) IND (2)

No.	Constituency	Member of Parliament	Party affiliation	Roles and responsibilities
1	Bagaha (SC)	Bhola Raut	Indian National Congress (Indira)	
2	Bettiah	Kedar Pandey	Indian National Congress (Indira)	Minister of Irrigation (June 8, 1980–Nov 12, 1980); Minister of Railways (Nov 12, 1980–Jan 15, 1982); Minister of Irrigation (Jan 15, 1982–Jan 29, 1983)
3	Motihari	Kamla Mishra Madhukar	Communist Party of India	
4	Gopalganj	Nagina Rai	Indian National Congress (Indira)	
5	Siwan	M. Yusuf	Indian National Congress (Indira)	
6	Maharajganj	Krishna Pratap Singh	Indian National Congress (Indira)	
7	Chapra	Satyadeo Singh	Janata Party	
8	Hajipur (SC)	Ram Vilas Paswan	Janata Party (Secular)	
9	Vaishali	Kishori Sinha	Janata Party	
10	Muzaffarpur	George Fernandes	Janata Party (Secular)	
11	Sitamarhi	Bali Ram Bhagat	Indian National Congress (Urs)	
12	Sheohar	Ram Dulari Singh	Indian National Congress (Indira)	MoS in the Ministry of Information and Broadcasting (June 8, 1980–Oct 19, 1980).; MoS in the Ministry of Labour and Rehabilitation (Oct 19, 1980–Jan 15, 1982).; MoS in the Ministry of Steel and Mines (Jan 15, 1982–Feb 14, 1983).; MoS in the Ministry of Commerce (Feb 14, 1983–Feb 7, 1984).; MoS in the Ministry of Home Affairs (Feb 7, 1984–Oct 31, 1984).; MoS in the Ministry of Home Affairs (Nov 4, 1984–Dec 31, 1984)
13	Madhubani	Shafiq Ullah Ansari	Indian National Congress (Indira)	
14	Jhanjharpur	Dhanik Lal Mandal	Janata Party (Secular)	
15	Darbhanga	Hari Nath Mishra	Indian National Congress (Indira)	MoS(I/C) of Rural Development (Jan 29, 1983–Aug 2, 1984).; MoS in the Min. of Irrigation (Aug 2, 1984–Oct 31, 1984).; MoS in the Min. of Planning (Nov 4, 1984–Dec 31, 1984)
16	Rosera (SC)	Baleshwar Ram	Indian National Congress (Indira)	
17	Samastipur	Ajit Kumar Mehta	Janata Party (Secular)	
18	Barh	Dharmvir Singh	Indian National Congress (Urs)	
19	Balia	Surya Narayan Singh	Communist Party of India	
20	Saharsa	Kamal Nath Jha	Indian National Congress (Indira)	
21	Madhepura	Rajendra Prasad Yadav	Indian National Congress (Urs)	
22	Araria (SC)	Dumar Lal Baitha	Indian National Congress (Indira)	
23	Kishanganj	Zamilur Rahman	Indian National Congress (Indira)	
24	Purnea	Madhuri Singh	Indian National Congress (Indira)	
25	Katihar	Shah Tarique Anwar	Indian National Congress (Indira)	
26	Rajmahal (ST)	Seth Hemrem	Indian National Congress (Indira)	
27	Dumka (ST)	Shibu Soren	Independent politician	
28	Godda	Samin Uddin	Indian National Congress (Indira)	
29	Banka	Chandra Shekhar Singh	Indian National Congress (Indira)	MoS in the Ministry of Energy (Power) (Jan 29, 1983–Aug 14, 1983).
30	Bhagalpur	Bhagwat Jha Azad	Indian National Congress (Indira)	MoS(I/C) of Supply and Rehabilitation (Oct 19, 1980–Jan 15, 1982).; MoS(I/C) of Labour (Jan 15, 1982–Sept 2, 1982).; MoS(I/C) of Civil Aviation (Sept 2, 1982–Feb 14, 1983).; MoS(I/C) of Civil Supplies and Cooperation (Feb 14, 1983–Oct 31, 1984); MoS(I/C) of Food and Civil Supplies (Nov 4, 1984–Dec 31, 1984)
31	Khagaria	Satish Prasad Singh	Indian National Congress (Indira)	
32	Monghyr	Devendra Prasad Yadav	Indian National Congress (Urs)	
33	Begusarai	Krishna Shahi	Indian National Congress (Indira)	
34	Nalanda	Vijay Kumar Yadav	Communist Party of India	
35	Patna	Ramavatar Shastri	Communist Party of India	
36	Arrah	Chandradeo Prasad Verma	Janata Party (Secular)	
37	Buxar	K. K. Tiwari	Indian National Congress (Indira)	
38	Sasaram (SC)	Jagjivan Ram	Janata Party	
39	Bikramganj	Tapeshwar Singh	Indian National Congress (Indira)	
40	Aurangabad	Satyendra Narain Singh	Janata Party	
41	Jehanabad	Mahendra Prasad	Indian National Congress (Indira)	
42	Nawada (SC)	Kunwar Ram	Indian National Congress (Indira)	
43	Gaya (SC)	Ramswaroop Ram	Indian National Congress (Indira)	
44	Chatra	Ranjit Singh	Indian National Congress (Indira)	
45	Kodarma	Reet Lal Pd. Verma	Janata Party	
46	Giridih	Bindeshwari Dubey	Indian National Congress (Indira)	
47	Dhanbad	A. K. Roy	Independent politician	
48	Hazaribagh	Kunwar Basant Narayan Singh	Janata Party	
49	Ranchi	Shiva Prasad Sahu	Indian National Congress (Indira)	
50	Jamshedpur	Rudra Pratap Sarangi	Janata Party	
51	Singhbhum (ST)	Bagun Sumbrai	Janata Party	
52	Khunti (ST)	Nirel Enem Horo	Jharkhand Party	
53	Lohardaga (ST)	Kartik Oraon	Indian National Congress (Indira)	MoS in the Ministry of Tourism and Civil Aviation (Jan 14, 1980–June 8, 1980).; MoS in the Ministry of Communications (June 8, 1980–Dec 8, 1981)
54	Palamau (SC)	Kamla Kumari	Indian National Congress (Indira)	Dy. Min. in the Ministry of Agriculture (Oct 19, 1980–Jan 29, 1983).; Dy. Min. in the Ministry of Rural Reconstruction (Nov 24, 1980–Jan 29, 1983)

== Goa, Daman and Diu (2) ==
INC(U) (1) MGP (1)

No.	Constituency	Member of Parliament	Party affiliation	Roles and responsibilities
1	Panaji	Rane Sirdessai Sayogita Jaibaa	Maharashtrawadi Gomantak Party	
2	Mormugao	Eduardo Martinho Faleiro	Indian National Congress (Urs)	

== Gujarat (26) ==
INC(I) (25) JP (1)

No.	Constituency	Member of Parliament	Party affiliation	Roles and responsibilities
1	Kutch	Mehta Mahipatray Mulshanker	Indian National Congress (Indira)	
2	Surendranagar	Digvijaysinh Pratapsinhji Zala	Indian National Congress (Indira)	
3	Jamnagar	Jadeja Dolatsinhji Pratapsinhji	Indian National Congress (Indira)	
4	Rajkot	Mavani Ramjibhai Bhurabhai	Indian National Congress (Indira)	
5	Porbandar	Odedra Maldeji Mandlikji	Indian National Congress (Indira)	
6	Junagadh	Patel Mohanlal Laljibhai	Indian National Congress (Indira)	
7	Amreli	Ravani Navinchandra Parmananddas	Indian National Congress (Indira)	
8	Bhavnagar	Gohil Gigabhai Bhavubhai	Indian National Congress (Indira)	
9	Dhandhuka (SC)	Makwana Narsinhbhai Karsanbhai	Indian National Congress (Indira)	
10	Ahmedabad	Maganbhai Barot	Indian National Congress (Indira)	Dy. Min. in the Ministry of Finance (June 8, 1980 - Jan 15, 1982)
11	Gandhinagar	Amrit Mohanal Patel	Indian National Congress (Indira)	
12	Mehsana	Chaudhary Motibhai Ranchhodbhai	Janata Party	
13	Patan (SC)	Parmar Hiralal Ranchhoddas	Indian National Congress (Indira)	
14	Banaskantha	Bheravdan Khetdanji Gadhavi	Indian National Congress (Indira)	
15	Sabarkantha	Patel Shantubhai Cunibhai	Indian National Congress (Indira)	
16	Kapadvanj	Solanki Natavarsinhji Kesarisinghji	Indian National Congress (Indira)	
17	Dohad (ST)	Damor Somjibhai Punjabhai	Indian National Congress (Indira)	
18	Godhra	Maharol Jaydeepsinhji Subhagsinhji	Indian National Congress (Indira)	
19	Kaira	Ajitsinh Fulsinhji Dabhi	Indian National Congress (Indira)	
20	Anand	Ishvarbhai Khodabhai Chavda	Indian National Congress (Indira)	
21	Chhota Udaipur (ST)	Rathawa Amarsingh Viriyabhai	Indian National Congress (Indira)	
22	Baroda	Gaekwad Ranjitsinhji Pratapsinhji	Indian National Congress (Indira)	
23	Broach	Patel Ahmedbhai Mohammedbhai	Indian National Congress (Indira)	
24	Surat	Patel Chhaganbhai Devabhai	Indian National Congress (Indira)	
25	Mandvi (ST)	Gamit Chhitubhai Devjibhai	Indian National Congress (Indira)	
26	Bulsar (ST)	Patel Uttambhai Harjibhai	Indian National Congress (Indira)	

== Haryana (10) ==
INC(I) (5) JP(S) (4) JP (1)

No.	Constituency	Member of Parliament	Party affiliation	Roles and responsibilities
1	Ambala (SC)	Suraj Bhan	Janata Party	
2	Kurukshetra	Manohar Lal	Janata Party (Secular)	
3	Karnal	Chiranji Lal	Indian National Congress (Indira)	
4	Sonepat	Devi Lal	Janata Party (Secular)	
5	Rohtak	Inder Vesh	Janata Party (Secular)	
6	Faridabad	Tayyab Hussain	Indian National Congress (Indira)	
7	Mahendragarh	Birender Singh	Indian National Congress (Indira)	Min. of Agriculture (Jan 14, 1980–Oct 31, 1984).; Min. of Irrigation (Nov 12, 1980–Jan 15, 1982).; Min. of Rural Reconstruction (Jan 20, 1980–Jan 23, 1982).; Min. of Rural Development (Jan 23, 1982–Jan 29, 1983).; Min. of Civil Supplies (Add. charge, March 19, 1981–Sept 2, 1982); Min. of Agriculture (Nov 4, 1984–Dec 31, 1984)
8	Bhiwani	Bansi Lal	Indian National Congress (Indira)	
9	Hisar	Mani Ram s/o Harji Ram	Janata Party (Secular)	
10	Sirsa (SC)	Dalbir Singh	Indian National Congress (Indira)	MoS in the Min. of Petroleum and Chemicals (June 8, 1980–Sept 2, 1982).; MoS in the Min. of Petroleum (Sept 2, 1982–Jan 29, 1983).; MoS in the Min. of Chemicals and Fertilizers (Sept 2, 1982–Jan 29, 1983).; MoS in the Min. of Energy (Petroleum) (Sept 2, 1982–Jan 29, 1983).; MoS in the Min. of Energy (Coal) (Jan 29, 1983–Oct 31, 1984).; MoS in the Min. of Energy (Coal) (Nov 4, 1984–Dec 31, 1984)

== Himachal Pradesh (4) ==
INC(I) (4)

No.	Constituency	Member of Parliament	Party affiliation	Roles and responsibilities
1	Simla (SC)	Krishan Dutt	Indian National Congress (Indira)	
2	Mandi	Vir Bahadur Singh	Indian National Congress (Indira)	MoS in the Ministry of Industry (Sept 2, 1982 - April 8, 1983)
3	Kangra	Vikram Chand Mahajan	Indian National Congress (Indira)	MoS in the Ministry of Energy (June 8, 1980 - Jan 29, 1980)
4	Hamirpur	Narain Chand	Indian National Congress (Indira)	

== Jammu and Kashmir (6) ==
JKNC (3) INC(I) (1) INC(U) (1) IND (1)

No.	Constituency	Member of Parliament	Party affiliation	Roles and responsibilities
1	Baramulla	Khwaja Mubarak Shah	Jammu & Kashmir National Conference	
2	Srinagar	Farooq Abdullah	Jammu & Kashmir National Conference	
3	Anantnag	Gh. Rasool Kochak	Jammu & Kashmir National Conference	
4	Ladakh	Phuntsog Namgyal	Independent politician	
5	Udhampur	Karan Singh	Indian National Congress (Urs)	
6	Jammu	Girdhari Lal Dogra	Indian National Congress (Indira)	

== Karnataka (28) ==
INC(I) (27) JP (1)

No.	Constituency	Member of Parliament	Party affiliation	Roles and responsibilities
1	Bidar (SC)	Narsingrao Suryawanshi	Indian National Congress (Indira)	
2	Gulbarga	Dharam Singh	Indian National Congress (Indira)	
3	Raichur	B. V. Desai	Indian National Congress (Indira)	
4	Koppal	H. G. Ramulu	Indian National Congress (Indira)	
5	Bellary	R. Y. Ghorpade	Indian National Congress (Indira)	
6	Davangere	T. V. Chandrashekarappa	Indian National Congress (Indira)	
7	Chitradurga	K. Mallanna	Indian National Congress (Indira)	
8	Tumkur	K. Lakkappa	Indian National Congress (Indira)	
9	Chikballapur	S. N. Prasan Kumar	Indian National Congress (Indira)	
10	Kolar (SC)	G. Y. Krishnan	Indian National Congress (Indira)	
11	Kanakapura	M. V. Chandrashekara Murthy	Indian National Congress (Indira)	
12	Bangalore North	C. K. Jaffer Sharief	Indian National Congress (Indira)	MoS in the Ministry of Railways (Jan 1980–Oct 1984); MoS(I/C) of Irrigation (Noc 1984–Dec 1984)
13	Bangalore South	T. R. Shamanna	Janata Party	
14	Mandya	S. M. Krishna	Indian National Congress (Indira)	MoS in the Min. of Industry (Jan 1983–Feb 1984).; MoS in the Min. of Finance (Feb 1984–Sept 1984).; MoS in the Min. of Commerce (Sept 1984–Oct 1984); MoS in the Min. of Commerce (Nov 1984–Dec 1984)
15	Chamarajanagar (SC)	Srinivasa Prasad	Indian National Congress (Indira)	
16	Mysore	M. Rajasekara Murthy	Indian National Congress (Indira)	
17	Mangalore	Janardhana Poojary	Indian National Congress (Indira)	Dy. Min. in the Ministry of Finance (Banking and Insurance) (Jan 1982–Oct 1984) & (Oct 1984–Dec 1984)
18	Udupi	Oscar Fernandes	Indian National Congress (Indira)	
19	Hassan	H. N. Nanje Gowda	Indian National Congress (Indira)	
20	Chikmagalur	D. M. Puttegowda	Indian National Congress (Indira)	
21	Shimoga	S. T. Quadri	Indian National Congress (Indira)	
22	Kanara	G. Devaraya Naik	Indian National Congress (Indira)	
23	Dharwad South	Fakruddinsab Hussensab Mohsin	Indian National Congress (Indira)	
24	Dharwad North	D. K. Naikar	Indian National Congress (Indira)	
25	Belgaum	Sidnal Shanmukhappa Basappa	Indian National Congress (Indira)	
26	Chikkodi (SC)	B. Shankaranand	Indian National Congress (Indira)	Dy. Min in the Dept of Social Welfare (Jan 1980–Oct 1980).; Min. of Education & Culture (Jan 1980–Oct 1980).; Min. of Health & Family Welfare (Jan 1980–Oct 1980) & (Nov 1984–Dec 1984)
27	Bagalkot	Veerendra Patil	Indian National Congress (Indira)	Min. of Petroleum & Chemicals (March 1980–Oct 1980).; Min. of Shipping & Transport (Oct 1980–Sept 1982) & (Sept 1984–Oct 1984); Min. of Labour & Rehabilitation (Sept 1982–Oct 1984) & (Nov 1984–Dec 1984
28	Bijapur	Choudhari Kalingappa Bhimanna	Indian National Congress (Indira)	

== Kerala (20) ==
CPI(M) (6) INC(I) (4) INC(U) (3) CPI (2) KC (2) IUML (2) IND (1)

No.	Constituency	Member of Parliament	Party affiliation	Roles and responsibilities
1	Kasaragod	M. Ramanna Rai	Communist Party of India (Marxist)	
2	Cannanore	K. Kunhambu	Indian National Congress (Urs)	
3	Badagara	K. P. Unnikrishnan	Indian National Congress (Urs)	
4	Calicut	E. K. Imbichi Bava	Communist Party of India (Marxist)	
5	Manjeri	Ebrahim Sulaiman Sait	Indian Union Muslim League	
6	Ponnani	Banatwala Gulam Mehmood	Indian Union Muslim League	
7	Palghat	V. S. Vijaya Raghavan	Indian National Congress (Indira)	
8	Ottapalam (SC)	A. K. Balan	Communist Party of India (Marxist)	
9	Trichur	K. A. Rajan	Communist Party of India (Marxist)	
10	Mukundapuram	Balanandan	Communist Party of India (Marxist)	
11	Ernakulam	Xavier Varghese Arakal	Indian National Congress (Indira)	
12	Muvattupuzha	George Joseph (Baby Mundackal)	Independent politician	
13	Kottayam	Skaria Thomas	Kerala Congress	
14	Idukki	M. M. Lawrence	Communist Party of India (Marxist)	
15	Alleppey	Suseela Gopalan	Communist Party of India (Marxist)	
16	Mavelikara	P. J. Kurien	Indian National Congress (Urs)	
17	Adoor (SC)	P. K. Kodiyan	Communist Party of India	
18	Quilon	B. K. Nair	Indian National Congress (Indira)	
19	Chirayinkil	A. A. Rahim	Indian National Congress (Indira)	MoS in the Ministry of Law, Justice & Company Affairs (Jan 15, 1982 - Sept 2, 1982).; MoS in the Ministry of External Affairs (Sept 2, 1982 - Oct 31, 1984) & (Nov 4, 1984 - Dec 31, 1984)
20	Trivandrum	Neelalohithadasan Nadar	Indian National Congress (Indira)	

== Madhya Pradesh (40) ==
INC(I) (35) JP (4) IND (1)

No.	Constituency	Member of Parliament	Party affiliation	Roles and responsibilities
1	Morena (SC)	Babulal Solanki	Indian National Congress (Indira)	
2	Bhind	Kalicharan Sharma	Indian National Congress (Indira)	
3	Gwalior	Narayan Krishnarao Shejwalkar	Janata Party	
4	Guna	Madhavrao Scindia	Indian National Congress (Indira)	
5	Sagar (SC)	Sahodrabai Rai	Indian National Congress (Indira)	
6	Khajuraho	Chaturvedi Vidyawati	Indian National Congress (Indira)	
7	Damoh	Prabhunarayan Ramdhan	Indian National Congress (Indira)	
8	Satna	Gulsher Ahmed	Indian National Congress (Indira)	
9	Rewa	Maharaja Martand Singh	Independent politician	
10	Sidhi (ST)	Moti Lal Singh	Indian National Congress (Indira)	
11	Shahdol (ST)	Dalbir Singh	Indian National Congress (Indira)	
12	Surguja (ST)	Chakradhari	Indian National Congress (Indira)	
13	Raigarh (ST)	Pushpa Devi Singh	Indian National Congress (Indira)	
14	Janjgir	Ramgopal Tiwari	Indian National Congress (Indira)	
15	Bilaspur (SC)	Godil Prasad Anuragi	Indian National Congress (Indira)	
16	Sarangarh (SC)	Parasram Ram Prasad	Indian National Congress (Indira)	
17	Raipur	Kayur Bhushan Mathura Prasad	Indian National Congress (Indira)	
18	Mahasamund	Vidya Charan Shukla	Indian National Congress (Indira)	Min. of Civil Supplies (June 8, 1980–March 19, 1981)
19	Kanker (ST)	Arvind Netam	Indian National Congress (Indira)	
20	Bastar (ST)	Laxman Karma	Indian National Congress (Indira)	
21	Durg	Chandulal Chanrakar	Indian National Congress (Indira)	MoS in the Min. of Tourism & Civil Aviation (June 8, 1980–Jan 15, 1982)
22	Rajnandgaon	Shivendra Bahadur Singh	Indian National Congress (Indira)	
23	Balaghat	Nandkishore Sharma	Indian National Congress (Indira)	
24	Mandla (ST)	Chhotelal Sonu	Indian National Congress (Indira)	
25	Jabalpur	Munder Sharma	Indian National Congress (Indira)	
26	Seoni	Gargishaker Ramkrishna Mishra	Indian National Congress (Indira)	MoS in the Min. of Energy (Coal) (Jan 1982–Sept 1982).; MoS in the Min. of Steel and Mines (Sept 1982–Sept 1982).; MoS in the Min. of Energy (Sept 1982–Jan 1983).; MoS in the Min. of Energy (Petroleum) (Jan 1983–Oct 1984).
27	Chhindwara	Kamal Nath	Indian National Congress (Indira)	
28	Betul	Gufran Azam	Indian National Congress (Indira)	
29	Hoshangabad	Rameshwar Nikhra	Indian National Congress (Indira)	
30	Bhopal	Shankar Dayal Sharma	Indian National Congress (Indira)	
31	Vidisha	Pratapbhanu Krishnagopal	Indian National Congress (Indira)	
32	Rajgarh	Pandit Vasant Kumar Ram Krishna	Janata Party	
33	Shajapur (SC)	Fulchand Verma	Janata Party	
34	Khandwa	Shivkumarsingh Nawal Singh	Indian National Congress (Indira)	
35	Khargone	Subhash Yadav	Indian National Congress (Indira)	
36	Dhar (ST)	Fatehbhanusingh s/o Ramsinh	Indian National Congress (Indira)	
37	Indore	Prakash Chandra Sethi	Indian National Congress (Indira)	Min. of Works & Housing (Jan 1980–Oct 1980).; Min. of Petroleum & Chemicals (Jan 1980–March 1980).; Min. of Railways (Jan 1982–Sept 1982).; Min. of Home Affairs (Sept 1982–July 1984).; Min. of Irrigation (Aug 1984–Oct 1984).; MoS(I/C) of Planning (July 1984–Oct 1984).
38	Ujjain (SC)	Satyanarayan Jatiya	Janata Party	
39	Jhabua (ST)	Dileep Singh Bhuria	Indian National Congress (Indira)	
40	Mandsaur	Bhanwarlal Rajmal Nahata	Indian National Congress (Indira)	

== Maharashtra (48) ==
No.	Constituency	Member of Parliament	Party affiliation	Roles and responsibilities
1	Rajapur	Madhu Dandavate	Janata Party	
2	Ratnagiri	Bapusaheb Parulekar	Janata Party	
3	Kolaba	A. T. Patil	Indian National Congress (Indira)	
4	Bombay South	Rajda Ratasinh Gokuldas	Janata Party	
5	Bombay South Central	Bhole R. R.	Indian National Congress (Indira)	
6	Bombay North Central	Pramila Madhu Dandvate	Janata Party	
7	Bombay North East	Subramanian Swamy	Janata Party	
8	Bombay North West	Ram Jethmalani	Janata Party	
9	Bombay North	Ravindra Varma	Janata Party	
10	Thane	Mhalgi Ramchandra Kashinath	Janata Party	
11	Dahanu (ST)	Shinghada Damu Barku	Indian National Congress (Indira)	
12	Nashik	Wagh Pratap Deoram	Indian National Congress (Indira)	
13	Malegaon (ST)	Khandole Zamaru Mangalu	Indian National Congress (Indira)	
14	Dhule (ST)	Bhoye Reshma Motiram	Indian National Congress (Indira)	
15	Nandurbar (ST)	Surupsing Hiriya Naik	Indian National Congress (Indira)	
16	Erandol	Vijay Kumar Naval Patil	Indian National Congress (Indira)	Dy. Min. in the Dept. of Science & Technology & Dept. of Space (June 1980–Oct 1980).; Dy. Min. in the Ministry of Communications (Oct 1980–Oct 1984) & (Nov 4, 1984–Dec 31, 1984)
17	Jalgaon	Yadav Shivram Mahajan	Indian National Congress (Indira)	
18	Buldhana (SC)	Wasnik Balkrishna Ramchandra	Indian National Congress (Indira)	
19	Akola	Vairale Madhusudan Atmaram	Indian National Congress (Indira)	
20	Washim	Gulam Nabi Azad	Indian National Congress (Indira)	Dy. Min. in the Ministry of Law, Justice & Company Affairs (Sept 1982–Feb 1984).; Dy. Min. in the Ministry of Information & Broadcasting (Feb 1984–Oct 1984).
21	Amravati	Usha Prakash Choudhari	Indian National Congress (Indira)	
22	Ramtek	Barve Jatiram Chaitram	Indian National Congress (Indira)	
23	Nagpur	Dhote Jambuwant Bapurao	Indian National Congress (Indira)	
24	Bhandara	Pardhir Keshaorao Atmaramji	Indian National Congress (Indira)	
25	Chimur	Muttemwar Vilas Baburao	Indian National Congress (Indira)	
26	Chandrapur	Shantaram Potdukhe	Indian National Congress (Indira)	
27	Wardha	Vasantrao Sathe	Indian National Congress (Indira)	Min. of Information & Broadcasting (Jan 1980–Sept 1982).; Min. of Supply & Rehabilitation (Jan 1980–Oct 1980).; Min. of Chemicals & Fertilizers (Sept 1982–Oct 1984)
28	Yavatmal	Patil Uttamrao Deorao	Indian National Congress (Indira)	
29	Hingoli	Uttamrao Baliramji Rathod	Indian National Congress (Indira)	
30	Nanded	Chavan Shankarrao Bhavrao	Indian National Congress (Indira)	Min. of Education & Culture (Oct 1980–Aug 1981).; Min. of Planning (Aug 1981–July 1984).; Min. of Defence (Aug 1984–Oct 1984) & (Oct 31, 1984–Dec 31, 1984)
31	Parbhani	Yadav Ramrao Narayanrao	Indian National Congress (Indira)	
32	Jalna	Balasaheb Pawar	Indian National Congress (Indira)	
33	Aurangabad	Kazi Salem	Indian National Congress (Indira)	
34	Beed	Kashirsagar Kesarbai Sonajirao alias Kaku	Indian National Congress (Indira)	
35	Latur	Shivraj Vishwanath Patil	Indian National Congress (Indira)	MoS in the Ministry of Defence (Oct 1980–Jan 1982).; MoS in the Ministry of Commerce (Jan 1982–Jan 1983).; Subsequently held multiple MoS roles in scientific departments (including Sci & Tech, Electronics, Space, Atomic Energy, & Ocean Development) (Jan 1983–Oct 1984).; MoS in the Department of Sci & Tech, Space, Atomic Energy, Electronics, & Ocean Development (Nov 4, 1984–Dec 31, 1984)
36	Osmanabad (SC)	Sawant Trimbak Marotrao	Indian National Congress (Indira)	
37	Solapur	Kuchan Gangadhar Sidramappa	Indian National Congress (Indira)	
38	Pandharpur (SC)	Thorat Sandipan Bhagwan	Indian National Congress (Indira)	
39	Ahmednagar	Athare Chandrabhan Balaji	Indian National Congress (Indira)	
40	Kopargaon	Vikhe Eknathrao Vithalrao	Indian National Congress (Indira)	
41	Khed	More Ramkrishna Sadashiv	Indian National Congress (Indira)	
42	Pune	Gadgil Vitthal Narhar	Indian National Congress (Indira)	MoS in the Ministry of Communications (Jan 1983–Oct 1984) & (Nov 4, 1984–Dec 31, 1984)
43	Baramati	Patil Shankarrao Bajirao	Indian National Congress (Indira)	
44	Satara	Chavan Yashwantrao Balawantrao	Indian National Congress (Urs)	
45	Karad	Mohite Yashavantrao Jijava	Indian National Congress (Indira)	
46	Sangli	Patil Vasantrao Banduji	Indian National Congress (Indira)	
47	Ichalkaranji	Mane Rajaram alias Balasaheb Shankarrao	Indian National Congress (Indira)	
48	Kolhapur	Gaikwad Udayasingrao Nanasaheb	Indian National Congress (Indira)	

== Manipur (2) ==
CPI (1) INC(I) (1)

No.	Constituency	Member of Parliament	Party affiliation	Roles and responsibilities
1	Inner Manipur	Ngangom Mohendra	Communist Party of India	
2	Outer Manipur (ST)	Gouzagin	Indian National Congress (Indira)	

== Meghalaya (2) ==
APHLC (1) INC(I) (1)

No.	Constituency	Member of Parliament	Party affiliation	Roles and responsibilities
1	Shillong	Dr. Bajubon R. Kharlukhi	All Party Hill Leaders Conference	
2	Tura (ST)	P. A. Sangma	Indian National Congress (Indira)	Dy. Min. in the Ministry of Industry (Oct 31, 1980 - Feb 15, 1982).; Dy. Min. in the Ministry of Commerce (Jan 15, 1982 - Oct 31, 1984) & (Nov 4, 1984 - Dec 31, 1984).

== Mizoram (1) ==
IND (1)

No.	Constituency	Member of Parliament	Party affiliation	Roles and responsibilities
1	Mizoram (ST)	Dr. R. Rothuama	Independent politician	

== Nagaland (1) ==
INC(I) (1)

No.	Constituency	Member of Parliament	Party affiliation	Roles and responsibilities
1	Nagaland	Chingwang Konyak	Indian National Congress (Indira)	

== Orissa (21) ==
INC(I) (20) JP(S) (1)

No.	Constituency	Member of Parliament	Party affiliation	Roles and responsibilities
1	Mayurbhanj (ST)	Man Mohan Tudu	Indian National Congress (Indira)	
2	Balasore	Chintamani Jena	Indian National Congress (Indira)	
3	Bhadrak (SC)	Arjun Charan Sethi	Indian National Congress (Indira)	
4	Jajpur (SC)	Anadi Charan Das	Indian National Congress (Indira)	
5	Kendrapara	Bijoynanda Patanaik	Janata Party (Secular)	
6	Cuttack	Janaki Ballabh Patnaik	Indian National Congress (Indira)	Min. of Tourism & Civil Aviation (Jan 14, 1980 - June 8, 1980).; Min. of Labour (Jan 16, 1980 - June 8, 1980)
7	Jagatsinghpur	Lakshman Mallick	Indian National Congress (Indira)	
8	Puri	Brajmohan Mohanty	Indian National Congress (Indira)	Dy. Min. in the Ministry of Civil Supplies (Oct 19, 1980 - Jan 15, 1982).; Dy. Min. in the Ministry of Works & Housing (Jan 15, 1982 - Jan 29, 1983)
9	Bhubaneswar	Chintamani Panigrahi	Indian National Congress (Indira)	
10	Aska	Ramachandra Rath	Indian National Congress (Indira)	MoS in the Ministry of Chemicals & Fertilizers (Sept 2, 1982 - Oct 31, 1984).
11	Berhampur	Jagannath Rao R.	Indian National Congress (Indira)	
12	Koraput (ST)	Giridhar Gamang	Indian National Congress (Indira)	Dy. Min. in the Ministry of Supply & Rehabilitation (Jan 15, 1982 - Sept 6, 1982).; Dy. Min. in the Ministry of Labour & Rehabilitation (Sept 6, 1982 - Jan 29, 1983)
13	Nowrangpur (ST)	Khagapati Pradhani	Indian National Congress (Indira)	
14	Kalahandi	Rasabehari Behara	Indian National Congress (Indira)	
15	Phulbani (SC)	Mrutyunjaya Nayak	Indian National Congress (Indira)	
16	Bolangir	Nityananda Mishra	Indian National Congress (Indira)	
17	Sambalpur	Krupasindhu Bhoi	Indian National Congress (Indira)	
18	Deogarh	Narayan Sahu	Indian National Congress (Indira)	
19	Dhenkanal	Raja Kamakhya Prasad Singh Deo Mahindra Bahadur	Indian National Congress (Indira)	Dy. Min. in the Ministry of Defence (Jan 15, 1982 - Jan 29, 1983).; MoS in the Ministry of Defence (Jan 29, 1983 - Oct 31, 1984); MoS in the Ministry of Defence (Nov 4, 1984 - Dec 31, 1984)
20	Sundargarh (ST)	Christopher Ekka	Indian National Congress (Indira)	
21	Keonjhar (ST)	Harihar Soren	Indian National Congress (Indira)	

== Punjab (13) ==
INC(I) (12) SAD (1)

No.	Constituency	Member of Parliament	Party affiliation	Roles and responsibilities
1	Gurdaspur	Sukhbans Kaur	Indian National Congress (Indira)	
2	Amritsar	Raghunandan Lal	Indian National Congress (Indira)	
3	Tarn Taran	Lehna Singh	Shiromani Akali Dal	
4	Jullundur	Rajinder Singh Sparrow	Indian National Congress (Indira)	
5	Phillaur (SC)	Ch. Sundar Singh	Indian National Congress (Indira)	
6	Hoshiarpur	Zail Singh	Indian National Congress (Indira)	Minister of Home Affairs (Jan 14, 1980 - June 22, 1982)
7	Ropar (SC)	Buta Singh	Indian National Congress (Indira)	MoS in the Ministry of Shipping & Transport (June 8, 1980 - Jan 15, 1982).; MoS(I/C) of Supply & Rehabilitation (Jan 15, 1982 - Sept 2, 1982).; MoS(I/C) of Supply & Sports (Sept 2, 1982 - Jan 29, 1983).; Min. of Works & Housing (Jan 29, 1983 - Oct 31, 1984).; Min. of Parl. Affairs (Jan 29, 1983 - Oct 31, 1984).; Min. of Parl. Affairs, Min. of Works & Housing, & Min. of Sports (Oct 31, 1984 - Dec 31, 1984).
8	Patiala	Amarender Singh	Indian National Congress (Indira)	
9	Ludhiana	Devinder Singh Garcha	Indian National Congress (Indira)	
10	Sangrur	Gurcharan Singh	Indian National Congress (Indira)	
11	Bhatinda (SC)	Hakam Singh	Indian National Congress (Indira)	
12	Faridkot	Gurbinder Kaur	Indian National Congress (Indira)	
13	Ferozepur	Bali Ram Bhagat	Indian National Congress (Indira)	Speaker of the Lok Sabha (22 Jan 1980 - 15 Jan 1985)

== Rajasthan (25) ==
INC(I) (19) JP (4) JP(S) (2)

No.	Constituency	Member of Parliament	Party affiliation	Roles and responsibilities
1	Ganganagar (SC)	Birbal	Indian National Congress (Indira)	
2	Bikaner	Manfool Singh	Indian National Congress (Indira)	
3	Churu	Daulat Ram Saran	Janata Party (Secular)	
4	Jhunjhunu	Bhim Singh	Janata Party	
5	Sikar	Kumbha Ram Arya	Janata Party (Secular)	
6	Jaipur	Satish Chandra Agarwal	Janata Party	
7	Dausa	Nawal Kishore Sharma	Indian National Congress (Indira)	MoS in the Ministry of Finance (Nov 12, 1984 - December 31, 1984)
8	Alwar	Ram Singh Yadav	Indian National Congress (Indira)	
9	Bharatpur	Rajesh Pilot	Indian National Congress (Indira)	
10	Bayana (SC)	Jagannath Persad Pahadia	Indian National Congress (Indira)	MoS in the Ministry of Finance (Jan 14, 1980 - June 6, 1980)
11	Sawai Madhopur (ST)	Ram Kumar	Indian National Congress (Indira)	
12	Ajmer	Acharya Bhagwan Dev	Indian National Congress (Indira)	
13	Tonk (SC)	Banwari Lal Bairwa	Indian National Congress (Indira)	
14	Kota	Krishan Kumar Goyal	Janata Party	
15	Jhalawar	Chatur Bhuj	Janata Party	
16	Banswara (ST)	Bhikha Bhai	Indian National Congress (Indira)	
17	Salumber (ST)	Jai Narain	Indian National Congress (Indira)	
18	Udaipur	Mohan Lal Sukhadia	Indian National Congress (Indira)	
19	Chittorgarh	Nrimala Kumari	Indian National Congress (Indira)	
20	Bhilwara	Girdhari Lal	Indian National Congress (Indira)	
21	Pali	Mool Chand Daga	Indian National Congress (Indira)	
22	Jalore (SC)	Virda Ram	Indian National Congress (Indira)	
23	Barmer	Virdhi Chand	Indian National Congress (Indira)	
24	Jodhpur	Ashok Gehlot	Indian National Congress (Indira)	Dy. Min in the Ministry of Tourism (Sept 2, 1982 - Feb 14, 1983).; Dy. Min in the Ministry of Tourism & Civil Aviation (Feb 14, 1983 - Feb 7, 1984).; Dy. Min in the Ministry of Sports (Feb 7, 1984 - Oct 31, 1984). & (Nov 12, 1984 - Dec 31, 1984).
25	Nagaur	Nathu Ram	Indian National Congress (Urs)	

== Sikkim (1) ==
SJP (1)

No.	Constituency	Member of Parliament	Party affiliation	Roles and responsibilities
1	Sikkim	Pahal Man Subba	Sikkim Janata Parishad	

== Tamil Nadu (39) ==
INC(I) (19) DMK (17) AIADMK (2) IND (1)

No.	Constituency	Member of Parliament	Party affiliation	Roles and responsibilities
1	Madras North	Lakshmanan G.	Dravida Munnetra Kazhagam	Deputy Speaker of the Lok Sabha (1 Dec 1980 - 31 Dec 1984)
2	Madras Central	Kalanidhi A.	Dravida Munnetra Kazhagam	
3	Madras South	R. Venkataraman	Indian National Congress (Indira)	Min. of Finance (Jan 14, 1980–Jan 15, 1982).; Min. of Industry (Jan 16, 1980–April 3, 1980).; Min. of Home Affairs (June 22, 1982–Sept 2, 1982).; Min. of Defence (Jan 15, 1982–Aug 2, 1984)
4	Sriperumbudur (SC)	Nagaratnam T.	Dravida Munnetra Kazhagam	
5	Chengalpattu	Anbarasu Era	Indian National Congress (Indira)	
6	Arakkonam	Velu A. M.	Indian National Congress (Indira)	
7	Vellore	Abdul Samad A.K.A.	Independent politician	
8	Tiruppattur	Murugian S.	Dravida Munnetra Kazhagam	
9	Vandavasi	Pattuswamy D.	Indian National Congress (Indira)	
10	Tindivanam	Ramaswamy Padayatchi S. S.	Indian National Congress (Indira)	
11	Cuddalore	Muthukumar R.	Indian National Congress (Indira)	
12	Chidambaram (SC)	Kulandaivelu V.	Dravida Munnetra Kazhagam	
13	Dharmapuri	Arjunan K.	Dravida Munnetra Kazhagam	
14	Krishnagiri	Ramamurthy K.	Indian National Congress (Indira)	
15	Rasipuram (SC)	Devarajan B.	Indian National Congress (Indira)	
16	Salem	Palaniappan C.	Dravida Munnetra Kazhagam	
17	Tiruchengode	Kandaswamy M.	Dravida Munnetra Kazhagam	
18	Nilgiris	Prabhu R.	Indian National Congress (Indira)	
19	Gobichettipalayam	Chinnasamy G.	All India Anna Dravida Munnetra Kazhagam	
20	Coimbatore	Ram Mohan alias Era Mohan R.	Dravida Munnetra Kazhagam	
21	Pollachi (SC)	Dhandapani C. T.	Dravida Munnetra Kazhagam	
22	Palani	Sanapathi Goundar A.	Indian National Congress (Indira)	
23	Dindigul	Maya Thevar K.	Dravida Munnetra Kazhagam	
24	Madurai	Subburaman A. G.	Indian National Congress (Indira)	
25	Periyakulam	Natarajan Cumbum N.	Dravida Munnetra Kazhagam	
26	Karur	Dorai Sebastian S. A.	Indian National Congress (Indira)	
27	Tiruchirappalli	Selvaraju N.	Dravida Munnetra Kazhagam	
28	Perambalur (SC)	Mani K. B. S.	Indian National Congress (Indira)	
29	Mayiladuthurai	Kudanthai Ramalingam N.	Indian National Congress (Indira)	
30	Nagapattinam (SC)	Karunanithi-Thazhai	Dravida Munnetra Kazhagam	
31	Thanjavur	Singaravadivel S.	Indian National Congress (Indira)	
32	Pudukkottai	V. N. Swamynathan	Indian National Congress (Indira)	
33	Sivaganga	Swaminathan R. V.	Indian National Congress (Indira)	MoS in the Ministry of Agriculture (Jan 14, 1980–Jan 29, 1983).; MoS in the Ministry of Rural Reconstruction (Nov 24, 1980–Jan 29, 1983).
34	Ramanathapuram	Sathiyendran M. S. K.	Dravida Munnetra Kazhagam	
35	Sivakasi	Sourdararajan N.	All India Anna Dravida Munnetra Kazhagam	
36	Tirunelveli	Sivaprakasam D. S. A.	Dravida Munnetra Kazhagam	
37	Tenkasi (SC)	Arunachalam M.	Indian National Congress (Indira)	
38	Tiruchendur	Kosalram K. T.	Indian National Congress (Indira)	
39	Nagercoil	Dennis N.	Indian National Congress (Indira)	

== Tripura (2) ==
CPI(M) (2)

No.	Constituency	Member of Parliament	Party affiliation	Roles and responsibilities
1	Tripura West	Ajoy Biswas	Communist Party of India (Marxist)	
2	Tripura East (ST)	Bajuban Riyan	Communist Party of India (Marxist)	

== Uttar Pradesh (85) ==
INC(I) (49) JP(S) (31) JP (3) CPI (1) IND (1)

No.	Constituency	Member of Parliament	Party affiliation	Roles and responsibilities
1	Tehri Garhwal	Trepan Singh Negi	Indian National Congress (Indira)	
2	Garhwal	Hemwati Nandan Bahuguna	Indian National Congress (Indira)	
3	Almora	Harish Chandra Singh	Indian National Congress (Indira)	
4	Nainital	Narayan Dutt Tiwari	Indian National Congress (Indira)	Min. of Planning (June 8, 1980–Aug 8, 1981).; Min. of Industry (Aug 8, 1981–Aug 3, 1984).; Min. of Labour (Oct 19, 1980–Jan 15, 1982).; Min. of Steel & Mines (Jan 15, 1982–February 14, 1983).; Min. in the Department of Coal (Sept 2, 1982–Sept 6, 1982).
5	Bijnor (SC)	Mangal Ram	Janata Party (Secular)	
6	Amroha	Chandra Pal Singh	Janata Party (Secular)	
7	Moradabad	Ghulam Mohammad Khan	Janata Party (Secular)	
8	Rampur	Zulfiqar Ali Khan	Indian National Congress (Indira)	
9	Sambhal	Bijendra Pal Singh	Indian National Congress (Indira)	
10	Badaun	Mohammad Asrar Ahmad	Indian National Congress (Indira)	
11	Aonla	Jaipal Singh Kashyap	Janata Party (Secular)	
12	Bareilly	Nisar Yar Khan	Janata Party (Secular)	
13	Pilibhit	Harish Kumar Gangwar	Indian National Congress (Indira)	
14	Shahjahanpur	Kr. Jatendra Prasad	Indian National Congress (Indira)	
15	Kheri	Bal Govind Verma	Indian National Congress (Indira)	
16	Shahabad	Dharmgaj Singh	Indian National Congress (Indira)	
17	Sitapur	Rajendra Kumari Bajpai	Indian National Congress (Indira)	
18	Misrikh (SC)	Ram Lal Rahi	Indian National Congress (Indira)	
19	Hardoi (SC)	Manni Lal	Indian National Congress (Indira)	
20	Lucknow	Sheila Kaul	Indian National Congress (Indira)	MoS in the Ministry of Edu. & Culture & Dept of Soc. Welfare (Oct 19, 1980–Aug 8, 1981).; Minister of Edu. & Culture (Aug 8, 1981–Oct 31, 1984).; MoS(I/C) of Edu., Culture & Soc. Welfare (Nov 4, 1984–Dec 31, 1984)
21	Mohanlalganj (SC)	Kailash Pati	Indian National Congress (Indira)	
22	Unnao	Ziaur Rehman Ansari	Indian National Congress (Indira)	MoS in the Min. of Commerce (March 3, 1980–Oct 19, 1980).; MoS in the Min. of Irrigation (Oct 19, 1980–Jan 29, 1983).; MoS in the Min. of Shipping & Transport (Jan 29, 1983–Oct 31, 1984) & (Nov 4, 1984–Dec 31, 1984)
23	Rae Bareli	Indira Gandhi	Indian National Congress (Indira)	Won from both Raebareli and Medak Lok Sabha constituencies. As per law, a candidate can represent only one constituency. Resigned from the Raebareli seat to retain the Medak seat.
24	Pratapgarh	Ajit Pratap Singh	Indian National Congress (Indira)	
25	Amethi	Sanjay Gandhi	Indian National Congress (Indira)	Died
25	Amethi	Rajiv Gandhi	Indian National Congress (Indira)	Elected in by-election; Prime Minister of India (October 31, 1984–December 31, 1984)
26	Sultanpur	Giriraj Singh	Indian National Congress (Indira)	
27	Akbarpur (SC)	Ram Avadh	Janata Party (Secular)	
28	Faizabad	Jai Ram Verma	Indian National Congress (Indira)	
29	Barabanki (SC)	Ram Kinkar	Janata Party (Secular)	
30	Kaiserganj	Rana Bir Singh	Indian National Congress (Indira)	
31	Bahraich	Mulana Saiyad Muzaffar Hussain	Indian National Congress (Indira)	
32	Balrampur	Chandra Bhal Mani Tewari	Indian National Congress (Indira)	
33	Gonda	Anand Singh alias Annubhaiya	Indian National Congress (Indira)	
34	Basti (SC)	Kalpnath	Indian National Congress (Indira)	Dy. Min. in the Ministry of Industry (Feb 15, 1982–Jan 29, 1983).; Dy. Min. in the Dept of Parl. Affairs (Jan 15, 1982–Sept 6, 1982).; MoS in the Ministry of Parl. Affairs (Jan 29, 1983–Oct 31, 1984)
35	Domariaganj	Kazi Jalil Abbasi	Indian National Congress (Indira)	
36	Khalilabad	Krishna Chandra Pandey	Indian National Congress (Indira)	
37	Bansgaon (SC)	Mahabir Prasad	Indian National Congress (Indira)	
38	Gorakhpur	Hari Kesh Bahadur	Indian National Congress (Indira)	
39	Maharajganj	Ashfaq Husain	Indian National Congress (Indira)	
40	Padrauna	Kunwar Chandra Pratap Narain Singh	Indian National Congress (Indira)	MoS in the Min. of Defence (March 3, 1980–Oct 19, 1980).; MoS in the Depts of Science & Technology, Electronics, Ocean Development, Environment, & Energy (Non-Conventional Energy Sources) between Oct 1980 & Feb 1983.
41	Deoria	Ramayan Rai	Indian National Congress (Indira)	
42	Salempur	Ram Nagina Misra	Indian National Congress (Indira)	
43	Ballia	Chandra Shekhar	Janata Party	
44	Ghosi	Jharkhande	Communist Party of India	
45	Azamgarh	Chandrajeet	Janata Party (Secular)	
46	Lalganj (SC)	Chhagur	Janata Party (Secular)	
47	Machhlishahr	Sheo Sharan Verma	Janata Party (Secular)	
48	Jaunpur	Azizulla	Janata Party (Secular)	
49	Saidpur (SC)	Rajnath Sonkar Shastri	Janata Party (Secular)	
50	Ghazipur	Jainul Bashar	Indian National Congress (Indira)	
51	Chandauli	Nihal Singh	Janata Party	
52	Varanasi	Kamalapati	Indian National Congress (Indira)	Cabinet Minister of Railways (January 14, 1980–November 12, 1980).
53	Robertsganj (SC)	Ram Pyare Panika	Indian National Congress (Indira)	
54	Mirzapur	Aziz Imam	Indian National Congress (Indira)	
55	Phulpur	B. D. Singh	Janata Party (Secular)	
56	Allahabad	Vishwanath Pratap Singh	Indian National Congress (Indira)	
57	Chail (SC)	Ram Nihore Rakesh	Indian National Congress (Indira)	
58	Fatehpur	Hari Kishan Shastri	Indian National Congress (Indira)	
59	Banda	Ram Nath Dubey	Indian National Congress (Indira)	
60	Hamirpur	Doongar Singh	Indian National Congress (Indira)	
61	Jhansi	Vishwa Nath Sharma	Indian National Congress (Indira)	
62	Jalaun (SC)	Nathuram Shakyawar	Indian National Congress (Indira)	
63	Ghatampur (SC)	Ash Karan Sankhwar	Janata Party (Secular)	
64	Bilhaur	Ram Narain Tripathi	Indian National Congress (Indira)	
65	Kanpur	Arif Mohammad Khan	Indian National Congress (Indira)	Dy. Min. in the Min. of Information & Broadcasting (Jan 15, 1982–Jan 29, 1983).; Dy. Min. in the Min. of Agriculture (Jan 29, 1983–Feb 7, 1984).; MoS in the Min. of Energy (Feb 7, 1984–Oct 31, 1984).; MoS in the Min. of Energy (Nov 12, 1984–Dec 31, 1984)
66	Etawah	Ram Singh Shakya	Janata Party (Secular)	
67	Kannauj	Chhotey Singh Yadav	Janata Party (Secular)	
68	Farrukhabad	Daya Ram Shakya	Janata Party	
69	Mainpuri	Raghunath Singh Verma	Janata Party (Secular)	
70	Jalesar	Chaudhary Multan Singh	Janata Party (Secular)	
71	Etah	Malik Mohd. Mishir A. Khan	Indian National Congress (Indira)	
72	Firozabad (SC)	Rajesh Kumar Singh	Independent politician	
73	Agra	Nihal Singh	Indian National Congress (Indira)	
74	Mathura	Chaudhary Digamber Singh	Janata Party (Secular)	
75	Hathras (SC)	Chandra Pal Shailani	Janata Party (Secular)	
76	Aligarh	Indra Kumari	Janata Party (Secular)	
77	Khurja (SC)	Trilok Chand	Janata Party (Secular)	
78	Bulandshahr	Mahmood Hasan Khan	Janata Party (Secular)	
79	Hapur	Anwar	Janata Party (Secular)	
80	Meerut	Mohsina Kidwai	Indian National Congress (Indira)	MoS in the Ministry of Labour & Rehabilitation (Sept 11, 1982–Jan 29, 1983).; MoS in the Ministry of Health & Family Welfare (Jan 29, 1983–Aug 2, 1984).; Min of Rural Dev. (Aug 2, 1984–Oct 31, 1984) & (Nov 4, 1984–Dec 31, 1984)
81	Baghpat	Charan Singh	Janata Party (Secular)	
82	Muzaffarnagar	Ghayoor Ali Khan	Janata Party (Secular)	
83	Kairana	Gyatri Devi	Janata Party (Secular)	
84	Saharanpur	Rasheed Masood	Janata Party (Secular)	
85	Hardwar (SC)	Jagpal Singh	Janata Party (Secular)	

== West Bengal (42) ==
CPI(M) (28) INC(I) (4) AIFB (3) RSP (4) CPI (3)

No.	Constituency	Member of Parliament	Party affiliation	Roles and responsibilities
1	Cooch Behar (SC)	Amar Roy Pradhan	All India Forward Bloc	
2	Alipurduars (ST)	Pius Tirkey	Revolutionary Socialist Party	
3	Jalpaiguri	Subodh Sen	Communist Party of India (Marxist)	
4	Darjeeling	Ananda Pathak	Communist Party of India (Marxist)	
5	Raiganj	Golam Yazdani	Indian National Congress (Indira)	
6	Balurghat (SC)	Barman Palas	Revolutionary Socialist Party	
7	Malda	Abdul Barkat Ataul Ghani Khan Chawdhury	Indian National Congress (Indira)	Min. of Energy (Jan 14, 1980–Sept 2, 1982).; Min. in the Dept of Coal (Jan 16, 1980–Jan 15, 1982).; Min. of Irrigation (Jan 14, 1980–June 8, 1980).; Min. of Railways (July 19, 1984–Oct 31, 1984).; Min. of Railways (Nov 4, 1984 - Dec 31, 1984).
8	Jangipur	Zainal Abedin	Communist Party of India (Marxist)	
9	Murshidabad	Masudal Hassain Syed	Communist Party of India (Marxist)	
10	Berhampore	Tridib Chaudhari	Revolutionary Socialist Party	
11	Krishnanagar	Renupada Das	Communist Party of India (Marxist)	
12	Nabadwip (SC)	Bidha Gohse (Goswami)	Communist Party of India (Marxist)	
13	Barasat	Chitta Basu	All India Forward Bloc	
14	Basirhat	Indrajit Gupta	Communist Party of India	
15	Joynagar (SC)	Sanat Kumar Mandal	Revolutionary Socialist Party	
16	Mathurapur (SC)	Mukundaram Mandal	Communist Party of India (Marxist)	
17	Diamond Harbour	Jyotirmoy Basu	Communist Party of India (Marxist)	
18	Jadavpur	Somnath Chatterjee	Communist Party of India (Marxist)	
19	Barrackpore	Mahammed Ismail	Communist Party of India (Marxist)	
20	Dum Dum	Niren Ghosh	Communist Party of India (Marxist)	
21	Calcutta North West	Ashoke Kumar Sen	Indian National Congress (Indira)	
22	Calcutta North East	Sunil Moitra	Communist Party of India (Marxist)	
23	Calcutta South	Satya Sadhan Chakrabarty	Communist Party of India (Marxist)	
24	Howrah	Samar Mukherjee	Communist Party of India (Marxist)	
25	Uluberia	Hannan Mollah	Communist Party of India (Marxist)	
26	Serampore	Dinen Bhattacharya	Communist Party of India (Marxist)	
27	Hooghly	Rup Chand Pal	Communist Party of India (Marxist)	
28	Arambagh	Bijoy Krishna Modak	Communist Party of India (Marxist)	
29	Panskura	Gita Mukherjee	Communist Party of India	
30	Tamluk	Misra Satyagopal	Communist Party of India (Marxist)	
31	Contai	Giri Sudhir Kumar	Communist Party of India (Marxist)	
32	Midnapore	Narayan Choubey	Communist Party of India	
33	Jhargram (ST)	Hasada Matilal	Communist Party of India (Marxist)	
34	Purulia	Chitta Ranjan Mahata	All India Forward Bloc	
35	Bankura	Acharya Basudev	Communist Party of India (Marxist)	
36	Bishnupur (SC)	Ajit Kumar Saha	Communist Party of India (Marxist)	
37	Durgapur (SC)	Krishna Chandra Halder	Communist Party of India (Marxist)	
38	Asansol	Ananda Gopal Mukhopadhyaya	Indian National Congress (Indira)	
39	Burdwan	Sushil Kumar Bhattacharya	Communist Party of India (Marxist)	
40	Katwa	Saifuddin Chwdhury	Communist Party of India (Marxist)	
41	Bolpur	Saradish Roy	Communist Party of India (Marxist)	
42	Birbhum (SC)	Gadadhar Saha	Communist Party of India (Marxist)	

== Andaman & Nicobar Islands (1) ==
No.	Constituency	Member of Parliament	Party affiliation	Roles and responsibilities
1	Andaman & Nicobar Islands	Manoranjan Bhakta	Indian National Congress (Indira)	

== Chandigarh (1) ==
No.	Constituency	Member of Parliament	Party affiliation	Roles and responsibilities
1	Chandigarh	Jagan Nath Kasuhal	Indian National Congress (Indira)	

== Dadra & Nagar Haveli (1) ==
No.	Constituency	Member of Parliament	Party affiliation	Roles and responsibilities
1	Dadra & Nagar Haveli (ST)	Mahala Ramji Potla	Indian National Congress (Indira)	

== National Capital Territory of Delhi (7) ==
No.	Constituency	Member of Parliament	Party affiliation	Roles and responsibilities
1	New Delhi	Atal Bihari Vajpayee	Janata Party	
2	South Delhi	Charanjit Singh (West Friends Colony)	Indian National Congress (Indira)	
3	Outer Delhi	Sajjan Kumar	Indian National Congress (Indira)	
4	East Delhi	H. K. L. Bhagat	Indian National Congress (Indira)	MoS in the Ministry of Parl. Affairs (Sept 2, 1982 - Oct 31, 1984).; MoS in the Ministry of Works & Housing (Sept 2, 1982 - Feb 14, 1983).; MoS(I/C) of Information & Broadcasting (Feb 14, 1983 - Oct 31, 1984) & (Nov 4, 1984 - Dec 31, 1984).; MoS in the Dept. of Parl. Affairs (Nov 4, 1984 - Dec 31, 1984).
5	Chandni Chowk	Bhiku Ram Jain	Indian National Congress (Indira)	
6	Delhi Sadar	Jagdish Tytler	Indian National Congress (Indira)	
7	Karol Bagh (SC)	Dharam Dass Shastri	Indian National Congress (Indira)	

== Lakshadweep (1) ==
No.	Constituency	Member of Parliament	Party affiliation	Roles and responsibilities
1	Lakshadweep (ST)	Muhammad Sayeed Padannatha	Indian National Congress (Urs)	

== Pondicherry (1) ==
No.	Constituency	Member of Parliament	Party affiliation	Roles and responsibilities
1	Pondicherry	P. Shanmugam	Indian National Congress (Indira)	
