= Shimoga Lok Sabha constituency =

Constituency of the Indian parliament in Karnataka

Coordinates: 13.9°N 75.6°E

Shimoga
- Lok Sabha constituency
- Shivamogga Lok Sabha Constituency Map

Constituency details
- Country: India
- Region: South India
- State: Karnataka
- Assembly constituencies: Shimoga Rural; Bhadravati; Shimoga; Tirthahalli; Shikaripura; Sorab; Sagar; Byndoor
- Established: 1952
- Reservation: None

Member of Parliament
- 18th Lok Sabha
- Incumbent B. Y. Raghavendra
- Party: BJP
- Elected year: 2019

Shimoga Lok Sabha constituency is one of the 28 Lok Sabha (parliamentary) constituencies in Karnataka state in southern India. As of 2005 it had 1,300,000 voters, of whom Scheduled Castes and Scheduled Tribes account for 150,000; Lingayat for around 350,000; Ediga for 200,000; Banjara for 100,000; Muslim for 150,000; Brahmins for 70,000 and Vokkaliga for 50,000 and others 150,000.

== Assembly segments ==
Shimoga Lok Sabha constituency consists of eight assembly segments. These are:

No	Name	District	Member	Party	Party Leading (in 2024)
111	Shimoga Rural (SC)	Shimoga	Sharada Puryanaik	JD(S)	BJP
112	Bhadravati	Shimoga	B.K. Sangameshwara	INC	BJP
113	Shimoga	Shimoga	Channabasapa	BJP	BJP
114	Tirthahalli	Shimoga	Araga Jnanendra	BJP	BJP
115	Shikaripura	Shimoga	B. Y. Vijayendra	BJP	BJP
116	Sorab	Shimoga	Madhu Bangarappa	INC	BJP
117	Sagar	Shimoga	Belur Gopalkrishna	INC	BJP
118	Byndoor	Udupi	Gururaj Gantihole	BJP	BJP

== Members of Parliament ==
^ denotes By poll

Year	Member	Party
1952	K.G. Wodeyar	Indian National Congress
1957	K.G. Wodeyar	Indian National Congress
1962	S. V. Krishnamoorthy Rao	Indian National Congress
1967	J. H. Patel	Samyukta Socialist Party
1971	T. V. Chandrashekarappa	Indian National Congress
1977	A. R. Badrinarayan	Indian National Congress
1980	S. T. Quadri	Indian National Congress (I)
1984	T. V. Chandrashekarappa	Indian National Congress
1989	T. V. Chandrashekarappa	Indian National Congress
1991	K. G. Shivappa	Indian National Congress
1996	S. Bangarappa	Karnataka Vikas Party
1998	Ayanur Manjunath	Bharatiya Janata Party
1999	S. Bangarappa	Indian National Congress
2004	S. Bangarappa	Bharatiya Janata Party
2005^	S. Bangarappa	Samajwadi Party
2009	B. Y. Raghavendra	Bharatiya Janata Party
2014	B. S. Yediyurappa	Bharatiya Janata Party
2018^	B. Y. Raghavendra	Bharatiya Janata Party
2019	B. Y. Raghavendra	Bharatiya Janata Party
2024	B. Y. Raghavendra	Bharatiya Janata Party

== Election results ==
Vote share of Winning candidates
2024	56.54%
2019	56.84%
2018 (By-Poll)	50.73%
2014	53.69%
2009	50.58%
2005 (By-Poll)	36.00%
2004	50.73%
1999	53.02%
1998	45.40%
1996	42.12%
1991	45.91%
1989	38.76%
1984	57.86%
1980	56.78%
1977	59.42%
1971	71.84%
1967	54.39%
1962	46.43%
1957	65.36%
1952	46.25%

=== 2024 ===
2024 Indian general election: Shimoga
Party	Candidate	Votes	%	±%
BJP	B. Y. Raghavendra	778,721	56.54	
INC	Geetha Shivarajkumar	535,006	38.85	
IND	K. S. Eswarappa	30,050	2.18	
NOTA	None of the Above	4,332	0.31	
BSP	A. D. Shivappa	2,779	0.20	
IND	16 Independent Candidates	23,837	1.73	
OTH	3 Other Party Candidates	2,499	0.18	
Majority		243,715	17.69	
Turnout		1,377,533	70.29	
BJP hold		Swing		

=== 2019 ===
2019 Indian general election: Shimoga
Party	Candidate	Votes	%	±%
BJP	B. Y. Raghavendra	729,872	56.84	
JD(S)	S. Madhubangarappa	506,512	39.45	
BSP	Guddappa	7,350	0.57	
NOTA	None of the Above	6,868	0.53	
IND	7 Independent Candidates	23,235	1.81	
OTH	2 Other Party Candidates	9,740	0.76	
Majority		223,360	17.39	
Turnout		1,283,879	76.58	
BJP hold		Swing		

=== 2018 by-election ===
By Election, 2018: Shimoga
Party	Candidate	Votes	%	±%
BJP	B. Y. Raghavendra	543,306	50.73	−2.96
JD(S)	S. Madhu Bangarappa	4,91,158	45.86	+24.55
IND	Shashikumar S. Gowda	17,189	1.60	+1.60
JD(U)	Mahima J. Patel	8,713	0.81	+0.41
NOTA	None of the Above	10,687	1.00	+0.37
Majority		52,148	4.87	−27.30
Turnout		10,71,099	65.06	−7.30
BJP hold		Swing	-2.96	

=== 2014 ===
2014 Indian general election: Shimoga
Party	Candidate	Votes	%	±%
BJP	B. S. Yeddyurappa	606,216	53.69	
INC	Manjunath Bhandary	242,911	21.52	
JD(S)	Geetha Shivarajkumar	240,636	21.31	
AAP	K. G. Sreedhar	7,542	0.67	
NOTA	None of the Above	7,077	0.63	
BSP	Kunaje Manjunatha Gowda	5,053	0.45	
JD(U)	B. Dharmappa	4,537	0.40	
IND	5 Independent Candidates	9,828	0.87	
OTH	2 Other Party Candidates	5,208	0.46	
Majority		363,305	32.17	
Turnout				
BJP hold		Swing		

=== 2009 ===
2009 Indian general election: Shimoga
Party	Candidate	Votes	%	±%
BJP	B. Y. Raghavendra	482,783	50.58	
INC	S. Bangarappa	429,890	45.04	
IND	H. S. Shekarappa	10,850	1.14	
BSP	J. Jayappa	8,205	0.86	
AIJMK (Note: Akhila India Jananayaka Makkal Katchi (Dr. Issac))	C. Murugan	6,046	0.63	
IND	7 Independent Candidates	16,633	1.74	
Majority		52,893	5.54	
Turnout				
Swing to BJP from SP		Swing		

=== 2005 by-election ===
2005 Shimoga Lok Sabha by-election
Party	Candidate	Votes	%	±%
SP	S. Bangarappa	269,013	36.00	
INC	Ayanur Manjunatha	252,376	33.77	
BJP	Bhanuprakash	148,640	19.89	
JD(S)	L. T. Thimmappa Hegade	54,578	7.30	
JD(U)	Shivalinga Swami	8,834	1.18	
IND	Bhadre Shivappa	8,737	1.17	
JP	K. S. Sathyanarayana	5,141	0.69	
Majority		16,637	2.23	
Turnout				
Swing to SP from INC		Swing		

=== 2004 ===
2004 Indian general election: Shimoga
Party	Candidate	Votes	%	±%
BJP	S. Bangarappa	450,097	50.73	
INC	Ayanur Manjunath	373,952	42.15	
JD(S)	G. Madappa	21,422	2.41	
IND	Sachidevi	18,768	2.12	
JP	S. Doddanna	16,282	1.84	
KNDP (Note: Kannada Nadu Party)	D. M. Chandrappa	6,769	0.76	
Majority		76,145	8.58	
Turnout		887,290		
Swing to BJP from INC		Swing		

=== 1999 ===
1999 Indian general election: Shimoga
Party	Candidate	Votes	%	±%
INC	S. Bangarappa	427,870	53.02	
BJP	Ayanur Manjunatha	332,832	41.24	
JD(S)	K. H. Srinivasa	38,432	4.76	
SP	V. A. Shareef	4,707	0.58	
IND	P. Vasundra Devi	3,202	0.40	
Majority		95,038	11.78	
Turnout		832,101	73.42	
Swing to INC from BJP		Swing		

=== 1998 ===
1998 Indian general election: Shimoga
Party	Candidate	Votes	%	±%
BJP	Ayanoor Manjunath	352,277	45.40	
INC	D. B. Chandre Gowda	192,370	24.79	
KTVP (Note: Kannada Vikash Party)	S. Bangarappa	186,731	24.07	
JD	B. P. Shivakumar	37,953	4.89	
IND	H. Bangarappa	6,565	0.85	
Majority		159,907	20.61	
Turnout		786,730	70.87	
Swing to BJP from INC		Swing		

=== 1996 ===
1996 Indian general election: Shimoga
Party	Candidate	Votes	%	±%
KVP	S. Bangarappa	303,152	42.12	
BJP	Ayanur Manjunatha	230,916	32.08	
JD	D. G. Basavana Gowda	100,990	14.03	
INC	K. G. Shivappa	66,145	9.19	
IND	13 Independent Candidates	18,518	2.57	
Majority		72,236	10.04	
Turnout			68.21	
Swing to Karnataka Vikas Party from INC		Swing		

=== 1991 ===
1991 Indian general election: Shimoga
Party	Candidate	Votes	%	±%
INC	K. G. Shivappa	281,182	45.91	
BJP	B. S. Yediyurappa	240,479	39.27	
JD	M. S. Mahadevappa	63,974	10.45	
KRRS	K. T. Gangadara	15,677	2.56	
Majority		40,703	6.64	
Turnout		627,367	60.15	
INC hold		Swing		

=== 1989 ===
1989 Indian general election: Shimoga
Party	Candidate	Votes	%	±%
INC	T. V. Chandrashekarappa	269,074	38.76	
JD	M. Kotoji Rao	128,704	18.54	
BJP	M. Ananda Rao	108,241	15.59	
JP	Mahishi Sarojini Bindurao	94,715	13.64	
KRRS	H. Ganapathiyappa	45,845	6.60	
IUML	Fazluddin A. M.	44,305	6.38	
IND	Choodapa G.	2,237	0.32	
IND	Nagaratana Ramakristna	1,128	0.16	
Majority		140,370	20.22	
Turnout		727,264	70.97	
INC hold		Swing		

=== 1984 ===
1984 Indian general election: Shimoga
Party	Candidate	Votes	%	±%
INC	T. V. Chandrashekarappa	299,038	57.86	
BJP	D. G. Shivannagowda	175,364	33.93	
IND	K. T. Mohan	28,330	5.48	
IND	M. Subraya Kodgi	4,436	0.86	
IND	S. Guruchidambara	4,084	0.79	
LKD	K. S. Ramachandra Setty	2,234	0.43	
IND	S. R. Nagappa Setty	1,423	0.28	
IND	H. M. Shankare Gowda	724	0.14	
IND	R. Yellappa	487	0.09	
IND	M. Lingappa	396	0.08	
IND	M. B. Eswara Rao	285	0.06	
Majority		123,674	23.93	
Turnout		529,421	70.98	
INC hold		Swing		

=== 1980 ===
1980 Indian general election: Shimoga
Party	Candidate	Votes	%	±%
INC(I)	S. T. Quadri	246,328	56.78	
JP	D. H. Shankara Murthy	94,530	21.79	
INC(U)	A. R. Badrinarayan	78,048	17.99	
JP(S)	Kanandur Lingappa	10,005	2.31	
IND	M. Lingaiah	1,534	0.35	
IND	Hulikere Chandrashekar	1,288	0.30	
IND	Bhoopalam Chandrasekharaiah	1,189	0.27	
IND	S. M. Onkara Murthy	878	0.20	
Majority		151,798	34.99	
Turnout		448,457	64.32	
INC(I) hold		Swing		

=== 1977 ===
1977 Indian general election: Shimoga
Party	Candidate	Votes	%	±%
INC	A. R. Badarinarayan	236,065	59.42	
JP	J. H. Patel	161,229	40.58	
Majority		74,836	18.84	
Turnout		409,137	73.10	
INC hold		Swing		

=== 1971 ===
1971 Indian general election: Shimoga
Party	Candidate	Votes	%	±%
INC	T. V. Chandrashekarappa	211,553	71.84	
SSP	J. H. Patel	79,111	26.86	
IND	S. Guruchidambara	3,823	1.30	
Majority		132,442	44.98	
Turnout		305,202	57.02	
Swing to INC from SSP		Swing		

=== 1967 ===
1967 Indian general election: Shimoga
Party	Candidate	Votes	%	±%
SSP	J. H. Patel	161,262	54.39	
INC	H. S. Rudrappa	135,208	45.61	
Majority		26,054	8.78	
Turnout		309,326	66.37	
Swing to SSP from INC		Swing		

=== 1962 ===
1962 Indian general election: Shimoga
Party	Candidate	Votes	%	±%
INC	S. V. Krishnamoorthy Rao	119,250	46.43	
PSP	V. K. Lakshmana Gowda	105,503	41.08	
ABJS	H. V. Srikanta Bhatta	17,596	6.85	
IND	H. H. Manjappa Gowda	14,469	5.63	
Majority		13,747	5.35	
Turnout		270,552	57.00	
INC hold		Swing		

=== 1957 ===
1957 Indian general election: Shimoga
Party	Candidate	Votes	%	±%
INC	K. G. Wodeyar	138,046	65.36	
PSP	T. L. Kallaiah	73,158	34.64	
Majority		64,888	30.72	
Turnout		211,204	53.89	
INC hold		Swing		

=== 1952 ===
1952 Indian general election: Shimoga
Party	Candidate	Votes	%	±%
INC	K. G. Wodeyar	108,990	46.25	
Socialist	T. L. Kalliah	53,719	22.80	
KMPP	K. H. Halappa	42,308	17.95	
ABJS	Malur Subba Rao	30,642	13.00	
Majority		55,271	23.45	
Turnout		235,659	75.14	
INC win (new seat)				

== See also ==
- Shimoga district
- List of constituencies of the Lok Sabha
