= St. Joseph's Indian High School =

- Forming Men and Women for Others

Location
- 23 Vittal Mallya Road; Bangalore, Karnataka; India
- Coordinates: 12°58′11″N 77°35′42″E

Information
- Type: Private primary and secondary school; Private pre-university and community college
- Motto: Latin: Fide et Labore (Faith and hard work)
- Religious affiliation: Catholicism
- Denomination: Jesuits
- Established: 1904; 121 years ago
- Administrator: Fr. Leo Periera, SJ
- Rector: Rev. Fr. Joseph Rodrigues, SJ
- Principal: Rev. Fr. Cyril Menezes SJ
- Staff: 14
- Faculty: 26
- Grades: K-12; pre-university; adult community college
- Colors: Blue and grey
- Publication: Josephite
- Yearbook: Spandana
- Website: sjiibangalore.com/sjhigh

St. Joseph's Indian High School is a private Catholic primary and secondary school and private pre-university and community college located in Bangalore, in the state of Karnataka, India. It traces its origins to a secondary school founded by the Paris Foreign Missions Society in 1904 on St. John's Hill. The Society of Jesus took over the administration of the school in 1937.

== History ==
The priests of the Paris Foreign Missions Society began running a school for European boys on Museum Road in 1904 and decided decades later to reach out to poor Catholics and established an Indian boys boarding school at St Joseph's Commerce College on Brigade Road. In 1972 this St. Joseph's Indian school moved to its present campus. The Sports Authority of India aided the school in building a swimming pool, gymnasium and hostel. A new building for the high school and PU College was completed in December 2006. In 2007, St. Joseph's Community College began to develop on the campus. It caters to rural unemployed youth and prepares them for gainful employment.

At the platinum jubilee celebration of St. Joseph's in 1979, film actress Nutan sang for "Nutan Musical Nite". The centenary celebrations were in 2004.

== Programs ==
On campus are a middle school and high school with a pre-university college, along with the community college; CAD coaching is also undertaken. The high school has twenty-one classes with thirty-five students in the "A" sections and about seventy students in the other six sections, for a total of over 3000 students.

Students are divided into four houses and there is an active Student Council. The major events held are sports day and the cultural fest "Prerana".

=== Community College ===
The Community College was initiated in 2005 in the Ashirvad slum area for school drop-outs. In 2006 it was moved to the High School grounds. In 2010 its courses were all certified by Indira Gandhi National Open University, and since 2013 further diploma courses have been certified by the University Grants Commission. At its tenth anniversary in 2015 a sports and cultural fest was conducted at which the college magazine UJWALA appeared. Over 1,300 students have passed through the college, studying in the areas of skills and trades, hospitality, beauticians and fitness, IT/ITES, printing, electronics, multimedia and communication technology. Students have come from throughout Karnataka and beyond.

== Facilities ==
Facilities include an auditorium which seats 800 and a hall seating 400. Sports facilities include basketball and volleyball courts and an Astroturf stadium used for hockey, rugby, football, handball, and cricket. There is also a sand court used for beach volleyball, Kabaddi, long jump, and shot put. Some facilities are shared among the various divisions of St. Joseph's. There is also a swimming pool and academy on campus. A tour of the high school is available online.

== Activities ==
School organizations and clubs include: Christian Life Community, National Army, Navy and Air Force Cadet Corps, Band and Music, Young Students Movement (cultural activities and leadership camps), ECO Club (waste disposal, water conservation, medicinal plants), Debating Association, Science Club (model making), Quiz Club, Information Technology (web designing and computer hardware), Hindi Chatra Mandal (writing, debate, poetics), Fine Arts (visit galleries and art schools), Philately and Numismatics.

Sportswise, the school has done very well in hockey and many students have excelled at the district, state, and national sports levels.

== Notable alumni ==
- R. Balasubramaniam, founder, Swami Vivekananda Youth Movement
- Ashish Ballal, field hockey player
- Kumar Bangarappa, film artist
- Roger Binny, cricket player
- Stuart Binny, cricket player
- Veerendra Heggade of Dharmasthala Temple
- Syed Kirmani, cricket player
- Rajesh Krishnan, actor
- Shashi Kumar, film artist
- Prakash Raj, film artist
- Ram Samudrala, American scientist
- S. K. Uthappa, field hockey player
- Madhu Bangarappa, Indian politician
- Arjun Halappa, field hockey player
- Sadhu Kokila, Indian musician and actor
- V. R. Raghunath, field hockey player

== See also ==
- List of Jesuit schools
- List of schools in Karnataka
- Violence against Christians in India
