= Madhu Bangarappa =

Indian politician

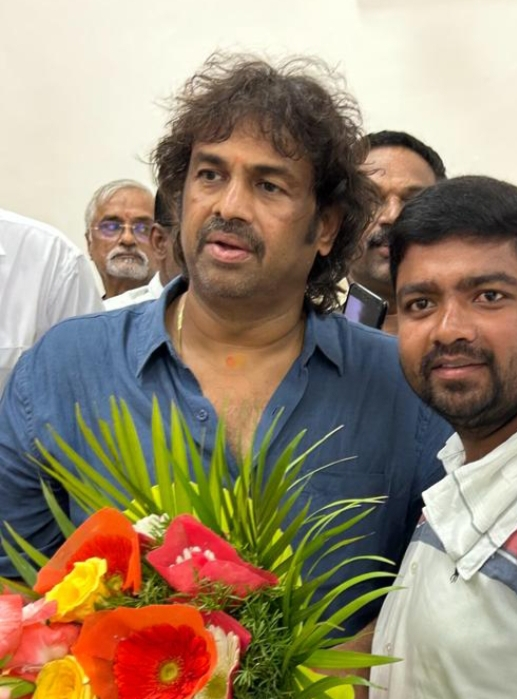
- Bangarappa in 2023

Cabinet Minister, Government of Karnataka
- Incumbent
- Assumed office 27 May 2023
- Governor: Thawarchand Gehlot
- Cabinet: Second Siddaramaiah ministry
- Chief Minister: Siddaramaiah
- Ministry and Departments: Primary & Secondary Education
- Preceded by: B. C. Nagesh

Member of Karnataka Legislative Assembly
- Incumbent
- Assumed office May 2023
- Preceded by: Kumar Bangarappa
- Constituency: Soraba
- In office 2013–2018
- Preceded by: H. Halappa
- Succeeded by: Kumar Bangarappa
- Constituency: Soraba

Personal details
- Born: Madhukumar Shivamogga
- Party: Indian National Congress (July 2021–present)
- Other political affiliations: Janata Dal (Secular) (till July 2021)
- Spouse: Anitha Madhu
- Parent(s): S. Bangarappa (father); Shakuntala (mother)
- Relatives: Kumar Bangarappa (brother); Dr Shiva Rajkumar (brother-in-law) see Rajkumar family
- Occupation: Producer, actor, politician

Sarekoppa Bangarappa Madhukumar, also known as Madhu Bangarappa, is an Indian politician, producer and actor from Karnataka. He is currently serving as Cabinet Minister in Government of Karnataka and a Member of Karnataka Legislative Assembly representing Sorab Assembly constituency. The State Congress Party declared him as OBC president of state. He is the present Primary and Secondary Education Minister of Karnataka 2023.

== Early life and education ==
Madhu Bangarappa was born to former Chief Minister of Karnataka late S. Bangarappa and late Shakuntala Bangarappa. He has an elder brother Kumar Bangarappa and three sisters. One of the sisters is Geetha Shivarajkumar.

He is an amateur radio operator with call sign VU2SLW.

He married Anitha.

He completed his graduation in Arts in 1988.

== Political career ==
Bangarappa was a Janata Dal (Secular) political party Member of Legislative Assembly elected from the Sorab constituency. He was also a candidate for the Shimoga seat Lok sabha by-polls 2018. Bangarappa joined Indian National Congress on 30 July 2021.

He won the Sorab Assembly constituency representing Indian National Congress in the 2023 Karnataka Legislative Assembly election. He polled 98,912 votes and defeated his nearest rival and his brother, Kumar Bangarappa of Bharatiya Janata Party, by a margin of 44,262 votes. His sister, Geetha Shivrajkumar, contested and lost the 2024 Lok Sabha election for which Bangarappa took the moral responsibility and thanked the voters.

== Film career ==
Madhu has produced Kannada feature films such as Belliyappa Bangarappa (1992) which was a big blockbuster hit in which his brother Kumar Bangarappa also appeared and co-produced.

== Filmography ==
Year	Film	Note(s)
1989	Sharavegada Saradara	Executive producer
1990	Ashwamedha	Executive producer
1992	Purushotthama	Producer
1992	Belliyappa Bangarappa	Producer
1994	Gandugali	Actor; cameo
1995	Thayi Illada Thavaru	Presenter
1996	Aadithya	Actor
2003	Gokarna	Actor
2006	Kallarali Hoovagi	Producer
