= Belliyappa Bangarappa =

- VCD cover
- Directed by: Poorna Pragnya
- Written by: Singeetham Srinivasa Rao
- Produced by: Madhu Bangarappa
- Starring: Kumar Bangarappa; Amala; K. S. Ashwath
- Cinematography: B. C. Gowrishankar
- Edited by: S. Manohar
- Music by: S. P. Balasubrahmanyam
- Production company: Sri Renukamba Combines
- Release date: 27 August 1992
- Running time: 146 minutes
- Country: India
- Language: Kannada

Belliyappa Bangarappa is a 1992 Indian Kannada-language comedy drama film directed by Poorna Pragnya, written by Singeetham Srinivasa Rao and produced by Madhu Bangarappa. The film stars Kumar Bangarappa and Amala, whilst a large number of popular actors including Vishnuvardhan, Shiva Rajkumar, V. Ravichandran, Tiger Prabhakar, Malashri and Sudharani appear in guest roles as themselves. Kumar Bangarappa played a dual role for the only time in his career. The film's music was composed by S. P. Balasubrahmanyam and cinematographer is B. C. Gowrishankar.

== Cast ==
- Kumar Bangarappa as himself & Bettangeri Belliyappa
- Amala as Mutthamma
- K. S. Ashwath as Police Commissioner
- Balakrishna as Rajasuite Utthappa (Belliyappa's grandfather)
- Lokanath as Black Dogs Team Chief
- Girija Lokesh as Kaveramma (Belliyappa's Mother)
- Vaishali Kasaravalli as Mutthamma's Mother
- M. S. Umesh as Kumar's Secretary-1
- Master Anand
- Mandeep Roy as Kumar's Secretary-2
- Sihi Kahi Chandru
- Bank Janardhan as member of Black Dogs
- Aravind
- K. M. Rathnakar

=== Guest appearances ===
- Vishnuvardhan
- Shiva Rajkumar
- V. Ravichandran
- Tiger Prabhakar
- Malashri
- Sudharani
- Srinath
- Vajramuni
- M. S. Rajashekar
- C. R. Simha
- Chi. Udaya Shankar
- V. K. Kannan

== Soundtrack ==
The music of the film was composed by S. P. Balasubrahmanyam with lyrics by Chi. Udaya Shankar.

Track listing
No.	Title	Lyrics	Singer(s)	Length
1.	"Beda Doora Hogayya"	Chi. Udaya Shankar	S. P. Balasubrahmanyam & K. S. Chithra	04:32
2.	"Belli Modada Mareya"	Chi. Udaya Shankar	S. P. Balasubrahmanyam & K. S. Chithra	04:47
3.	"Dinaku Dina Dinnanaa"	Chi. Udaya Shankar	S. P. Balasubrahmanyam	05:23
4.	"Ninna Notake"	Chi. Udaya Shankar	S. P. Balasubrahmanyam & K. S. Chithra	05:00
5.	"Sannamma Naanaru"	Chi. Udaya Shankar	S. P. Balasubrahmanyam & K. S. Chithra	05:03
