= Soraba Assembly constituency =

Legislative Assembly constituency in Karnataka State, India

Coordinates: 14.38°N 75.09°E

Soraba
- Constituency No. 116 for the Karnataka Legislative Assembly

Constituency details
- Country: India
- Region: South India
- State: Karnataka
- District: Shimoga
- Lok Sabha constituency: Shimoga
- Established: 1966
- Total electors: 195,341
- Reservation: None

Member of Legislative Assembly
- 16th Karnataka Legislative Assembly
- Incumbent Madhu Bangarappa
- Party: Indian National Congress
- Elected year: 2023
- Preceded by: Kumar Bangarappa

Soraba Assembly constituency is one of the 224 Legislative Assembly constituencies of Karnataka in India.

It is part of Shimoga district.

== Members of the Legislative Assembly ==
Election	Member	Party
1967	Sarekoppa Bangarappa	Sanghata Socialist Party
1972	Sarekoppa Bangarappa	Samyukta Socialist Party
1978	Sarekoppa Bangarappa	Indian National Congress
1983	Sarekoppa Bangarappa	Janata Party
1985	Sarekoppa Bangarappa	Indian National Congress
1989	Sarekoppa Bangarappa	Indian National Congress
1994	Sarekoppa Bangarappa	Karnataka Pradesh Congress Committee
1996 By-election	Kumar Bangarappa	Karnataka Pradesh Congress Committee
1999	Kumar Bangarappa	Indian National Congress
2004	Kumar Bangarappa	Indian National Congress
2008	Hartalu Halappa	Bharatiya Janata Party
2013	Madhu Bangarappa	Janata Dal
2018	Kumar Bangarappa	Bharatiya Janata Party
2023	Madhu Bangarappa	Indian National Congress

== Election results ==
=== Assembly Election 2023 ===
2023 Karnataka Legislative Assembly election : Soraba
Party	Candidate	Votes	%	±%
INC	Madhu Bangarappa	98,912	60.30%	▲46.39
BJP	S. Kumara Bangarappa	54,650	33.32%	▼12.83
JD(S)	Basuru Chandregowdru	6,477	3.95%	▼33.70
NOTA	None of the above	1,010	0.62%	▼0.05
Margin of victory		44,262	26.98%	▲18.47
Turnout		164,249	84.08%	▼0.57
Total valid votes		164,036		
Registered electors		195,341		▲5.81
INC gain from BJP		Swing	▲14.15	

=== Assembly Election 2018 ===
2018 Karnataka Legislative Assembly election : Soraba
Party	Candidate	Votes	%	±%
BJP	Kumar Bangarappa	72,091	46.15%	▲42.35
JD(S)	S. Madhu Bangarappa	58,805	37.65%	▼4.95
INC	Raju. M. Talluru	21,721	13.91%	▼10.23
NOTA	None of the above	1,039	0.67%	New
Margin of victory		13,286	8.51%	▼6.94
Turnout		156,284	84.65%	▲2.58
Total valid votes		156,194		
Registered electors		184,621		▲7.31
BJP gain from JD(S)		Swing	▲3.55	

=== Assembly Election 2013 ===
2013 Karnataka Legislative Assembly election : Soraba
Party	Candidate	Votes	%	±%
JD(S)	Madhu Bangarappa	58,541	42.60%	▲41.81
KJP	H. Halappa	37,316	27.16%	New
INC	S. Kumara Bangarappa	33,176	24.14%	▼2.17
BJP	Chikkavali Nagarajagowda	5,226	3.80%	▼39.56
Independent	H. Bheemappa	1,514	1.10%	New
Independent	Basavanyappa. G	1,343	0.98%	New
Independent	K. Gurumurthy	1,081	0.79%	New
BSRCP	B. Chandrappagowda	1,026	0.75%	New
JD(U)	K. S. Satyanarayana	940	0.68%	▲0.07
Margin of victory		21,225	15.45%	▼1.60
Turnout		141,194	82.07%	▲5.39
Total valid votes		137,407		
Registered electors		172,039		▲6.80
JD(S) gain from BJP		Swing	▼0.76	

=== Assembly Election 2008 ===
2008 Karnataka Legislative Assembly election : Soraba
Party	Candidate	Votes	%	±%
BJP	Hartalu Halappa	53,552	43.36%	▲11.53
INC	S. Kumara Bangarappa	32,499	26.31%	▼17.12
SP	S. Madhu Bangarappa	31,135	25.21%	New
Independent	A. R. Shivalinga Swamy	2,588	2.10%	New
Independent	V. G. Parashurama	1,041	0.84%	New
JD(S)	Suresh Wodiyar	981	0.79%	▼1.31
BSP	Kotresh. M. E	959	0.78%	▼0.11
JD(U)	K. S. Satyanarayana	753	0.61%	New
Margin of victory		21,053	17.05%	▲5.45
Turnout		123,521	76.68%	▼0.05
Total valid votes		123,508		
Registered electors		161,081		▲20.06
BJP gain from INC		Swing	▼0.07	

=== Assembly Election 2004 ===
2004 Karnataka Legislative Assembly election : Soraba
Party	Candidate	Votes	%	±%
INC	Kumar Bangarappa	44,677	43.43%	▼0.50
BJP	Madhu Bangarappa	32,748	31.83%	New
Independent	Basavanyappa. G	18,209	17.70%	New
JP	A. R. Shivalinga Swamy	2,432	2.36%	New
JD(S)	Ishwarappa Naik	2,160	2.10%	▲0.19
Independent	Basur Chandrappa Gowda	992	0.96%	New
BSP	Kiran Kumar. R. G	916	0.89%	New
Urs Samyuktha Paksha	Devaraja. S. G	745	0.72%	New
Margin of victory		11,929	11.60%	▼2.56
Turnout		102,943	76.73%	▲0.57
Total valid votes		102,879		
Registered electors		134,166		▲11.10
INC hold		Swing	▼0.50	

=== Assembly Election 1999 ===
1999 Karnataka Legislative Assembly election : Soraba
Party	Candidate	Votes	%	±%
INC	Kumar Bangarappa	38,773	43.93%	▲36.14
Independent	K. B. Prakash	26,278	29.77%	New
JD(U)	Ishwarappa Naik	13,675	15.49%	New
Independent	K. Manjunatha	4,003	4.54%	New
Independent	Basur Chandrappa Gowda	2,170	2.46%	New
JD(S)	K. Dakappa	1,684	1.91%	New
Independent	K. M. Yusuf	1,684	1.91%	New
Margin of victory		12,495	14.16%	▼29.10
Turnout		91,968	76.16%	▲11.62
Total valid votes		88,267		
Rejected ballots		3,700	4.02%	▲2.56
Registered electors		120,764		▲4.44
INC gain from INC		Swing	▼15.40	

=== Assembly By-election 1996 ===
1996 Karnataka Legislative Assembly by-election : Soraba
Party	Candidate	Votes	%	±%
INC	Kumar Bangarappa	44,689	59.33%	▲7.38
BJP	M. R. Patil	12,108	16.07%	▲8.85
Independent	Basur Chandrappa Gowda	8,140	10.81%	New
INC	P. Channaverappa Gowda	5,866	7.79%	▲2.64
Independent	Pani Rajappa	4,519	6.00%	New
Margin of victory		32,581	43.26%	▲22.24
Turnout		74,622	64.54%	▼14.35
Total valid votes		75,322		
Rejected ballots		1,091	1.46%	▼0.26
Registered electors		115,626		▲2.05
INC hold		Swing	▲7.38	

=== Assembly Election 1994 ===
1994 Karnataka Legislative Assembly election : Soraba
Party	Candidate	Votes	%	±%
INC	Sarekoppa Bangarappa	45,641	51.95%	New
Independent	Basur Chandrappa Gowda	27,171	30.93%	New
BJP	C. Bangarappa	6,339	7.22%	▲3.88
INC	Edur Parasuramppa	4,525	5.15%	▼49.53
JD	Pani Rajappa	3,529	4.02%	▼31.57
Margin of victory		18,470	21.02%	▲1.93
Turnout		89,387	78.89%	▼0.49
Total valid votes		87,853		
Rejected ballots		1,533	1.72%	▼3.10
Registered electors		113,304		▲12.38
INC gain from INC		Swing	▼2.73	

=== Assembly Election 1989 ===
1989 Karnataka Legislative Assembly election : Soraba
Party	Candidate	Votes	%	±%
INC	Sarekoppa Bangarappa	41,648	54.68%	▼10.16
JD	Edooru Parashuramappa	27,107	35.59%	New
JP	Sudheer	3,813	5.01%	New
BJP	M. R. Patil	2,543	3.34%	New
Kranti Sabha	N. K. Manjunatha Gowda	821	1.08%	New
Margin of victory		14,541	19.09%	▼15.98
Turnout		80,030	79.38%	▲4.41
Total valid votes		76,171		
Rejected ballots		3,859	4.82%	▲3.23
Registered electors		100,823		▲26.58
INC hold		Swing	▼10.16	

=== Assembly Election 1985 ===
1985 Karnataka Legislative Assembly election : Soraba
Party	Candidate	Votes	%	±%
INC	Sarekoppa Bangarappa	38,102	64.84%	▲29.17
JP	Prapulla Madhukar	17,491	29.77%	▼34.56
LKD	K. V. Rudrappa Gowda	1,857	3.16%	New
Independent	Masthar Kariyappa	958	1.63%	New
Margin of victory		20,611	35.07%	▲6.41
Turnout		59,714	74.97%	▼4.64
Total valid votes		58,763		
Rejected ballots		951	1.59%	▼0.14
Registered electors		79,650		▲8.10
INC gain from JP		Swing	▲0.51	

=== Assembly Election 1983 ===
1983 Karnataka Legislative Assembly election : Soraba
Party	Candidate	Votes	%	±%
JP	Sarekoppa Bangarappa	37,081	64.33%	▲45.46
INC	Kagodu Thimmappa	20,559	35.67%	▲18.97
Margin of victory		16,522	28.66%	▼12.87
Turnout		58,654	79.61%	▲0.19
Total valid votes		57,640		
Rejected ballots		1,014	1.73%	▼0.59
Registered electors		73,679		▲6.46
JP gain from INC(I)		Swing	▲3.93	

=== Assembly Election 1978 ===
1978 Karnataka Legislative Assembly election : Soraba
Party	Candidate	Votes	%	±%
INC(I)	Sarekoppa Bangarappa	32,426	60.40%	New
JP	S. Nagappa	10,131	18.87%	New
INC	P. Channaverappa Gowda	8,965	16.70%	▼14.46
Independent	N. S. Chandrasekhara	1,741	3.24%	New
Margin of victory		22,295	41.53%	▲26.62
Turnout		54,962	79.42%	▲1.61
Total valid votes		53,687		
Rejected ballots		1,275	2.32%	▲2.32
Registered electors		69,207		▲7.09
INC(I) gain from SSP		Swing	▲14.32	

=== Assembly Election 1972 ===
1972 Mysore State Legislative Assembly election : Soraba
Party	Candidate	Votes	%	±%
SSP	Sarekoppa Bangarappa	22,537	46.08%	New
INC	R. C. Patil	15,243	31.16%	▼5.15
INC(O)	H. K. Rudrappa Naik	11,133	22.76%	New
Margin of victory		7,294	14.91%	▼11.09
Turnout		50,289	77.81%	▲0.83
Total valid votes		48,913		
Registered electors		64,628		▲15.82
SSP gain from SSP		Swing	▼16.23	

=== Assembly Election 1967 ===
1967 Mysore State Legislative Assembly election : Soraba
Party	Candidate	Votes	%	±%
SSP	Sarekoppa Bangarappa	25,724	62.31%	New
INC	M. P. Eswarappa	14,990	36.31%	New
Independent	B. Gowda	569	1.38%	New
Margin of victory		10,734	26.00%	
Turnout		42,952	76.98%	
Total valid votes		41,283		
Registered electors		55,798		
SSP win (new seat)				

== See also ==
- List of constituencies of the Karnataka Legislative Assembly
- Shimoga district
