= Sarekoppa Bangarappa =

Indian politician (1933–2011)

6th Chief Minister of Karnataka
- In office 17 October 1990 – 19 November 1992
- Preceded by: Veerendra Patil
- Succeeded by: M. Veerappa Moily

Member of Parliament for Shimoga
- In office 5 June 2005 – 12 February 2009
- Preceded by: Himself
- Succeeded by: B. Y. Raghavendra
- In office 6 October 1999 – 10 March 2005
- Preceded by: Ayanur Manjunath
- Succeeded by: Himself
- In office 1996–1998
- Preceded by: K. G. Shivappa
- Succeeded by: Ayanur Manjunath

Member of the Karnataka Assembly for Soraba
- In office 1967–1996
- Succeeded by: Kumar Bangarappa

Personal details
- Born: 26 October 1933 Kubaturu, Kingdom of Mysore, British India
- Died: 26 December 2011 (aged 78) Bengaluru, Karnataka, India
- Party: Janata Dal (Secular) (2010–11)
- Other political affiliations: Karnataka Vikas Party; Samajwadi Party (2005–09); Bharatiya Janata Party (2004–05); Karnataka Congress Party (1994–96); Karnataka Kranti Ranga (1983–1989); Indian National Congress (–1983; 1996–2004; 2009–10)
- Spouse: Shakuntala (m. 1958–2011)
- Children: 5, including Kumar, Madhu

Sarekoppa Bangarappa (26 October 1933 – 26 December 2011) was an Indian politician who was the 9th Chief Minister of Karnataka from 1990 to 1992.

He served as a Member of the Legislative Assembly for Karnataka between 1967 and 1996, before contesting a series of six elections for the Lok Sabha from 1996 to 2009, of which he lost two. He founded both the Karnataka Vikas Party and the Karnataka Congress Party during a 44-year career in which his supporters called him Solillada Saradara (a leader who cannot be defeated). As well as these two parties, Bangarappa was at various times a member of the Indian National Congress, the Bharatiya Janata Party, the Samajwadi Party and Janata Dal (Secular), and his critics described him as a party-hopper because of this.

== Early life ==
Bangarappa was born on 26 October 1933 in Kubatur village, Soraba Taluk, Shimoga district, Karnataka. He married Shakuntala in 1958 and the couple had five children, including the actor Kumar Bangarappa and film maker Madhu Bangarappa, both of whom have also been politicians. He came from the Deevaru- Idiga community.

He obtained a Bachelor of Arts degree, a similar degree in Law and a Diploma in Social Science. He stayed in Kubaturu with his joint family he also had a sister named bangaramma.His niece K S Palakshappa and his son Girish took care of the house hold.

== Political career ==
Bangarappa began his career in politics as a socialist. He was elected to the Karnataka Legislative Assembly in 1967 from the Soraba constituency of Shimoga district. He became known as a champion of the backward classes, of which his Deevaru origins made him a member. Subsequently, he joined the Indian National Congress (INC) and became a minister in the government of Devaraj Urs, with his first appointment being as Minister of State in the Home department in 1977. This post was followed by that of Cabinet Minister for the Public Works Department in 1978 and then Revenue and Agriculture Minister between 1980 and 1981. In 1979, he served for a year as President of the Karnataka Pradesh Congress Committee.

In 1983, he left the INC and became involved with the Karnataka Kranti Ranga (Karnataka Revolutionary Front, also known as the Kannada Kranti Ranga) that had been established a few years earlier by the now-deceased Urs. A brief alliance between the KKR and the Janata Party (JP) resulted in the 1983 election of the first non-INC government in the state. Although there had been speculation that he would be appointed Chief Minister in that government, this post went instead to Ramakrishna Hegde of the JP. Bangarappa gradually realigned himself with the INC after spending some time supporting the government of Hegde.

Bangarappa was appointed as the Leader of Opposition in the Karnataka Legislative Assembly in 1985 and held that post until 1987. Following the Congress victory in 1989, he became Agriculture Minister in the Veerendra Patil cabinet. He was appointed as Chief Minister of the state in 1990 after Patil was removed on the orders of Rajiv Gandhi, allegedly on health grounds. Subsequently, in 1992, Bangarappa was replaced as Chief Minister by Veerappa Moily. During his tenure, he promoted three popular programmes: Aradhana (to revive and rebuild 36,000 religious shrines), Ashraya (to build houses for the poor) and Vishwa (financial aid for rural artisans and cottage industries). His term had been marred by several allegations of his involvement in scandals, such as that involving Classik Computers, although he was cleared of any impropriety in that case. His removal followed his government's failure in handling the Cauvery riots.

Bangarappa left the INC after his removal and formed the Karnataka Congress Party (KCP). His election successes after leaving the chief ministership demonstrated the extent of his personal support with the electorate, which seemed not to be reliant upon the political party to which he belonged, although his popularity declined over time. He came to be seen as a "turncoat politician" who lacked ideology and principle and who moved from one party to another according to whichever he considered to be the most likely to gain power at the time.

Having won the Soraba assembly seat on seven occasions, Bangarappa left it and the Karnataka Legislative Assembly in 1996. In the same year, he contested the Shimoga constituency, a mostly agricultural area in which the Idiga caste dominated, and was elected a member of the Lok Sabha as a KCP candidate. He then, went on to form the Karnataka Vikas Party (KVP) and lost in 1998 as a representative of the KVP. However, he was re-elected in 1999 as an INC candidate. In 2004, he joined the Bharatiya Janata Party (BJP) and was re-elected to the Lok Sabha as a BJP candidate with a large majority. In 2005 he resigned from the BJP and joined the Samajwadi Party, sparking a by-election to the Lok Sabha that he won. In 2008, he contested against the BJP Chief Ministerial candidate, Yeddyurappa, in the Shikaripura assembly seat and lost heavily. In the 2009 Lok Sabha elections, he lost to Yeddyurappa's son, B. Y. Raghavendra, of the BJP. In that last election, Bangarappa had represented the INC. Later, in December 2010 and with his political career in decline, Bangarappa joined the Janata Dal (Secular).

== Electoral History ==
=== Lok Sabha ===
Year	Constituency	Party	Votes	%	Opponent	Party	Votes	%	Result	Margin	%
2009	Shimoga	INC	4,29,890	45.04	B. Y. Raghavendra	BJP	4,82,783	50.58	Lost	-52,893	-5.54
2004	Shimoga	BJP	4,50,097	50.73	Ayanur Manjunath	INC	3,73,952	42.15	Won	+76,145	+8.58
1999	Shimoga	INC	4,27,870	53.02	Ayanur Manjunatha	BJP	3,32,832	41.24	Won	+95,038	+11.78
1998	Shimoga	KVP	1,86,731	24.07	Ayanur Manjunath	BJP	3,52,277	45.40	Lost	-1,65,546	-21.33
1996	Shimoga	KCP	3,03,152	42.12	Ayanur Manjunatha	BJP	2,30,916	32.08	Won	+72,236	+10.04

== Death ==
Bangarappa suffered from diabetes and died on 26 December 2011 in a Bangalore hospital due to multiple causes. His funeral was attended by a large number of supporters and was held with state honours at his native village.

Police had to intervene during the funeral ceremonies due to disputes between factions, much of which appeared to revolve around family differences involving Kumar and Madhu Bangarappa. Comments made by Bangarappa at the time of the 2004 assembly elections caused problems for his son, Kumar, who was at that time a minister in the INC government of S. M. Krishna. Kumar represented his father's old constituency, Soraba, and differences of opinion between the two men had already surfaced, which Bangarappa appeared to delight in publicising but Kumar attempted to play down. Kumar reacted to his father's decision to join the BJP in order to contest the Lok Sabha elections by himself resigning from the INC and his ministerial role. Kumar then discovered that his politically inexperienced younger brother, Madhu Bangarappa, had been selected by the BJP to fight the constituency, apparently at the instigation of his father. Kumar returned to the INC and agreed to stand for election against his brother, determined to make a point to his father and to support Krishna's desire to see Bangarappa humiliated on what was his "home turf". Bangarappa campaigned for Madhu and attempted to mobilise his own support to that end. However, although Bangarappa himself won handsomely from the Shimoga Lok Sabha seat, he was unable to secure the victory of Madhu in Soraba.

== Positions held ==
- 1967-96: Member, Karnataka Legislative Assembly (7 terms, from Soraba)
- 1977-78: Minister of State, Home, Government of Karnataka
- 1978-79: Cabinet Minister, P.W.D., Government of Karnataka
- 1979-80: President, Karnataka Pradesh Congress Committee [K.P.C.C. (I)]
- 1980-81: Minister, Revenue and Agriculture, Government of Karnataka
- 1985-87: Leader of Opposition, Karnataka Legislative Assembly
- 1989-90: Minister, Agriculture and Horticulture, Government of Karnataka
- 1990-92: Chief Minister, Karnataka
- 1996: Elected to 11th Lok Sabha as a KCP candidate
- 1998: President, Karnataka Vikas Paksha; but came third in Lok Sabha election in Shimoga seat.
- 1999: Re-elected to 13th Lok Sabha (2nd term) as an INC candidate
- 2004: Re-elected to 14th Lok Sabha (3rd term) as a BJP candidate
- 2005: Re-elected to Lok Sabha in a by-election from Samajwadi party .
- 2008: Lost in State Assembly elections (to Yediyurappa in Shikaripura)
- 2009: Lost in 2009 General Elections of Lok Sabha, Shimoga seat
- December 2010: Joined the JD (S)

Preceded by Veerendra Patil	12th Chief Minister of Karnataka; 17 October 1990 – 19 November 1992	Succeeded by M. Veerappa Moily
