= Sharavegada Saradara =

1989 Kannada action film directed by K. V. Jayaram

- Directed by: K. V. Jayaram
- Screenplay by: K. V. Jayaram
- Produced by: Shanthilal Jain
- Starring: Kumar Bangarappa
- Cinematography: R. C. Mapakshi
- Edited by: S. Manohar
- Music by: Sangeetha Raja
- Release date: 12 May 1989
- Country: India
- Language: Kannada

Sharavegada Saradara (transl. Chieftain with the speed of an arrow) is a 1989 Indian Kannada-language action film starring Kumar Bangarappa, Ashwini Bhave and Poonam Javeri. The film has musical score by Sangeetha Raja. The film is based on a novel by Sudarshan Desai. Director K. V. Jayaram, who also wrote the screenplay, shot the film in 70mm format making it the first 70mm film in Kannada.

== Plot ==
Vishwanath Rai is a wealthy, kind-hearted businessman who has earned much respect by his deeds. Naganna, his brother-in-law, plots against him so as to execute some of his wicked schemes and make it big in the field of black money. When the former discovers this he fights Naganna and dies in the process. Thirsty for vengeance, his son Tejashri "Teja" returns from abroad after several years to confront his nemesis.

== Cast ==
- Kumar Bangarappa
- Ashwini Bhave
- Poonam Javeri
- Srinath
- Asha Parekh
- Pandaribai
- C. R. Simha
- H. G. Dattatreya
- Master Manjunath
- Honnavalli Krishna

== Soundtrack ==
The film has musical score by Sangeetha Raja. The soundtrack album comprises seven tracks with five singles and two duets. S. P. Balasubrahmanyam rendered his voice for all the songs. The lyrics were penned by Doddarange Gowda.

Sharavegada Saradara

Soundtrack album by Sangeetha Raja
- Released: 1989 (initial release); 3 August 2018 (official release of the soundtrack album)
- Genre: Feature film Soundtrack
- Length: 35:29
- Language: Kannada
- Label: Sony Music India; 550 Music

No.	Title	Singer(s)	Length
1.	"Kote Katti Meredaa"	S. P. Balasubrahmanyam
2.	"Anuraagave Hoovagide"	S. P. Balasubrahmanyam and K. S. Chithra
3.	"Atta Itta Sutta Mutta"	S. P. Balasubrahmanyam and K. S. Chithra
4.	"Aaseyo Kaadide"	Anuradha
5.	"Yuga Yugada Belakagi"	S. P. Balasubrahmanyam
6.	"Kannada Naadina Rannada"	S. P. Balasubrahmanyam
7.	"Sharavegada Saradara" (Title Track)	S. P. Balasubrahmanyam

== See also ==
- Aruna Raaga
- Ibbani Karagithu
- Ksheera Sagara
