= T. V. Chandrashekarappa =

Indian politician (1934–1991)

Member of Legislative Assembly of Karnataka
- Constituency: Shimoga

Personal details
- Born: 3 April 1934 Nalkudure, Shimoga district, Karnataka, British India
- Died: 18 November 1991 (aged 57) Bangalore, India
- Party: Indian National Congress

T. V. Chandrashekarappa (2 April 1934 – 18 November 1991) was an Indian politician who was a member of 5th Lok Sabha from Shimoga (Lok Sabha constituency) in Karnataka State.

He was elected to 7th Lok Sabha from Davangere (Lok Sabha constituency) and 8th and 9th Lok Sabha from Shimoga.

Chandrashekarappa died in Bangalore on 18 November 1991, at the age of 57.
