= Idiga =

Hindu community

Regions with significant populations
- Andhra Pradesh, Karnataka, Telangana

Languages
- Telugu, Kannada

Religion
- Hinduism

Edigas or Idigas is a Hindu toddy tapper community in Karnataka, Telangana, Andhra Pradesh and Tamil Nadu.

The traditional occupation of Idiga people was toddy tapping. They are mostly concentrated in the Malenadu and Shivamogga districts of Karnataka. Similar but culturally distinct toddy tapping communities, called the Billava and Deevaru, exist in Dakshina Kannada and southern Karnataka, respectively. There had been attempts to cause these various communities to cohere politically but these had petered out by the 1980s.

The Idiga were categorised as an Other Backwards Class (OBC) in the 1980s, when they constituted around 2.5 per cent of the population in Karnataka. Despite their low numbers, eleven Idiga people were elected as Members of the Legislative Assembly in the 1985 elections, making them the largest single OBC group in the Legislative Assembly of Karnataka. They had six Members in 1978 and eight in 1983. They remain a significant political force and were described as a part of the AHINDA bloc that significantly helped the Indian National Congress party in the 2013 Assembly elections.

Significant number of Idigas have become very wealthy and powerful by extending their involvement in toddy tapping to that of excise contracting, distilling and brewing on contract to large businesses, but the economic base of the community remains limited mostly to that of liquor. Idigas of Neeravari Pradesh of Karnataka own large number of fertile land making them earn large source of income. Politicians such as Sarekoppa Bangarappa, themselves of the toddy-tapping community, (Note: Some sources say that Bangarappa was a Deevaru or Billava, others that he was an Idiga.) have been able to use the support of these prosperous people.

Idiga also practised bone-setting and, together with some members of the Vokkaliga community, are relatively dominant in that field.

The Kannada-language Prajavani newspaper was founded by an Idiga liquor contractor who had "made some money in the war" and, as of 1997, was still controlled by his descendants.

== See also ==
- Ezhava, toddy-tapper caste of Kerala
- Nadar (caste), toddy-tapper caste of Tamil Nadu
- Bhandari (caste), toddy-tapper caste of Konkan
- Siyal (caste), toddy-tapper caste of Odisha
