= S. T. Quadri =

Indian politician (1932 - 2005)

Member of Parliament, Lok Sabha
- In office 18 January 1980 – 31 December 1984
- Constituency: Shimoga

Personal details
- Born: 10 October 1932 Koppal, Raichur District.
- Died: 15 November 2005 (aged 73) Mysore, Karnataka.
- Party: Indian National Congress
- Spouse: Banu Begum (7 May 1953)
- Children: 3 sons and 3 daughters
- Parent: Syed Sirajul Hassan Quadri (father)
- Education: B.E., Osmania University, Hyderabad.
- Profession: Engineer - Steel Technologist and Politician

S.T. Quadri (10 October 1932 – 15 November 2005) is an Indian politician and Member of Parliament (MP), represented the Shimoga constituency in 7th Lok Sabha, the lower house of the Indian Parliament. He was nominated as the Director of the Salem Steel Plant in Tamil Nadu by the Government of India in 1976.

== Early life and background ==
Quadri was born on 10 October 1932 in Koppal of Raichur district. Syed Sirajul Hassan Quadri was his father. He completed his education from Osmania University, Hyderabad.

== Personal life ==
S.T. Quadri was married Banu Begum on 7 May 1953 and the couple has 3 sons and 3 daughters.

== Positions held ==
- Member of Karnataka State Haj Committee.

No	From	To	Position
1	1954	1958	President of Taluk Congress Committee.
2	1955	1958	Member of the District Congress Committee.
2	1955	1958	Member of Mysore Pradesh Congress Committee.
3	1980	1984	MP in 7th Lok Sabha from Shimoga. Member of Committee on Private Members' Bills and Resolutions (1980).

== Death ==
He died at the age of 73 in Mysore, Karnataka on 15 Nov 2005.
