= Kumar Bangarappa =

Indian film actor and politician (born 1963)

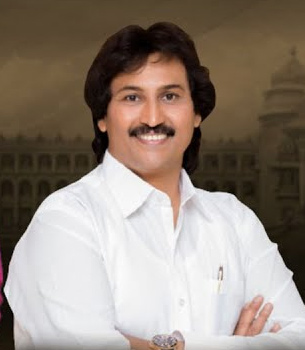
- Born: Sarekoppa Vasanth Kumar; 28 September 1963 (age 63)
- Other name: Vasanth Kumar
- Occupations: Actor, politician
- Years active: 1988–present
- Political party: Bharatiya Janata Party
- Children: 2
- Father: S. Bangarappa
- Relatives: Madhu Bangarappa (brother); Geetha Shivarajkumar (sister); Shiva Rajkumar (brother-in-law); (Also see Rajkumar family)
- Constituency: Soraba

Sarekoppa Vasanth Kumar, also known as Kumar Bangarappa (born 28 September 1963) is an Indian actor and politician known for his works primarily in Kannada cinema and few Telugu language films. He is known for the action, stunts and villainous roles.

== Career ==
Kumar Bangarappa is an Indian actor in Kannada films. He was the youngest member of the legislature as well as the youngest minister of Karnataka state in former Chief Minister of Karnataka S. M. Krishna's cabinet at the age of 33.

== Personal life ==
Kumar Bangarappa was born on 28 September 1963 to S. Bangarappa, former Chief Minister of Karnataka and Shakuntala. He married Vidyullatha and has a son Arjun Bangarappa and a daughter Lavanya. Arjun has completed civil engineering. Lavanya has completed her biomedical engineering and married to a Hyderabad family.

== Politics ==
He entered politics dramatically in 1996 after a stint as a film actor donning lead roles in many Kannada films. He was asked to contest the by-election to fill the vacancy in the Soraba constituency of Shimoga district - which his father represented from 1967 to 1994 - seven times in a row - till he got elected to the Lok Sabha, making way for his son. He was elected to Legislative Assembly of Karnataka in the Karnataka Congress Party, a regional political party founded by his father in 1994 after he was asked to resign as Chief Minister.

He was again elected from the same assembly constituency in 1999 as a Congress candidate after the merger of Karnataka Congress Party with Congress for second-term. He won as MLA from Soraba constituency on INC for third-term successively in 2004 election. He was inducted into S.M. Krishna government as minister of state for Municipal Administration (Independent Charge). Prior to that, he also worked as Minister of State for Minor Irrigation. For a few days, he resigned Indian National Congress party and joined Bharatiya Janata Party (BJP) for 20 days to revert Congress again.

He lost in the 2008 election on the Congress ticket, including his brother - Madhu Bangarappa on Samajwadi Party ticket, to Hartalu Halappa from BJP.

He is now elected as the Member of the Legislative Assembly (MLA) in the Government of Karnataka for the 2018 Legislative Assembly from the Bharatiya Janata Party (BJP), he won by defeating his brother Madhu Bangarappa by a huge margin of 13,500 votes by getting 72,000 votes.

=== Family feud and a rift ===
He entered politics as a stranger from the film industry without wielding any influence, even when his father was Chief Minister; however, a rift in the family developed ahead of the 2004 elections, when his younger brother Madhu Bangarappa wanted to contest only from Soraba and not from any other constituency even when the family did not want him to upsurge a family rift, on promise father S Bangarappa had to go against the wish of people and Kumar Bangarappa taking stance for the younger son Madhu. While Kumar stayed away from politics for a few weeks thousands of people wanted him to contest and on the request of them he had to make a political decision to contest against his own brother on a congress ticket while Madhu on the BJP ticket, and retained the seat with a huge margin of 24,000 votes, it was the first time that S. Bangarappa was defeated though his own son had won. At one stage, he even resigned Congress and left his minister of state portfolio to join BJP as per the directions of his father and returned to Congress soon when he felt uncomfortable in the BJP camp, bringing the family feud matters into the open public. The family feud grew till Bangarappa and both his sons lost the elections, including the continuance of disturbances between both the brothers during the family ritual celebrations after the death of S. Bangarappa.

== Filmography ==
- All films are in Kannada, unless otherwise noted.

Year	Title	Role(s)	Note(s)
1984	Antar Yuddham		Telugu film
1987	Vijayotsava		
1989	Sharavegada Saradara	Tejaswi	
1990	Ashwamedha	Raja / Vinu	
1991	Navathare		
1992	Teja		Telugu film
1992	Jhenkara		
1992	Amara Prema		Also playback singer
1992	Purushotthama		Narrator
1992	Ksheera Sagara		
1992	Belliyappa Bangarappa	Bettangeri Belliyappa / Himself	
1993	Apoorva Jodi		
1993	Angaiyalli Apsare		
1994	Keralida Sarpa		
1996	Nirbandha		
1999	Chaithrada Chiguru		
2003	Raktha Kanneeru	Balu	
2004	Thali Kattuva Shubhavele	Jeevan	
2017	Chakravarthy	Sharad Shetty	
