= 1980 Indian general election =

- 3 and 6 January 1980

529 of the 531 seats in the Lok Sabha (Note: Two seats were reserved for Anglo-Indians and filled by presidential nomination) 265 seats needed for a majority
- Registered: 356,205,329
- Turnout: 56.92% (▼5.55pp)
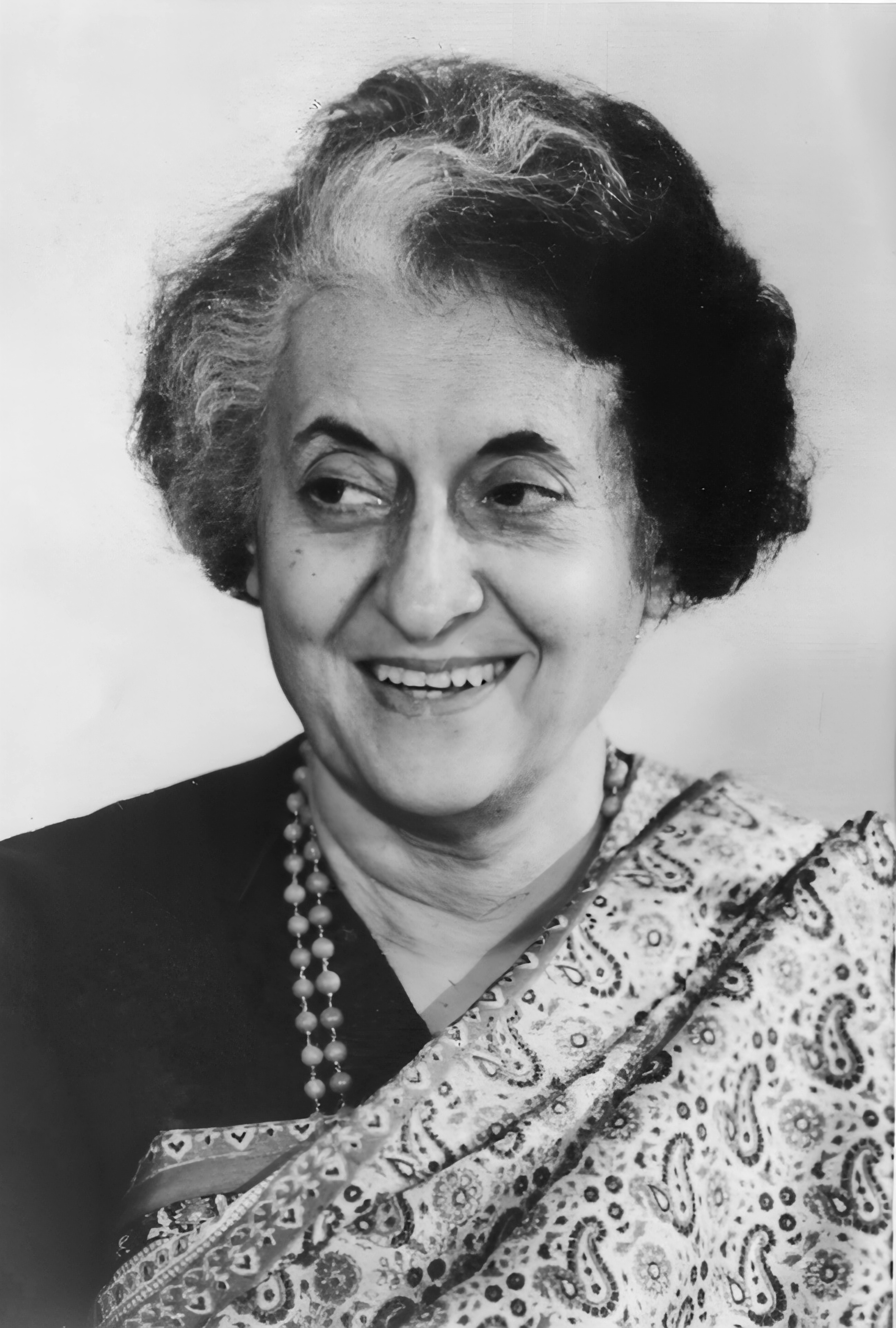

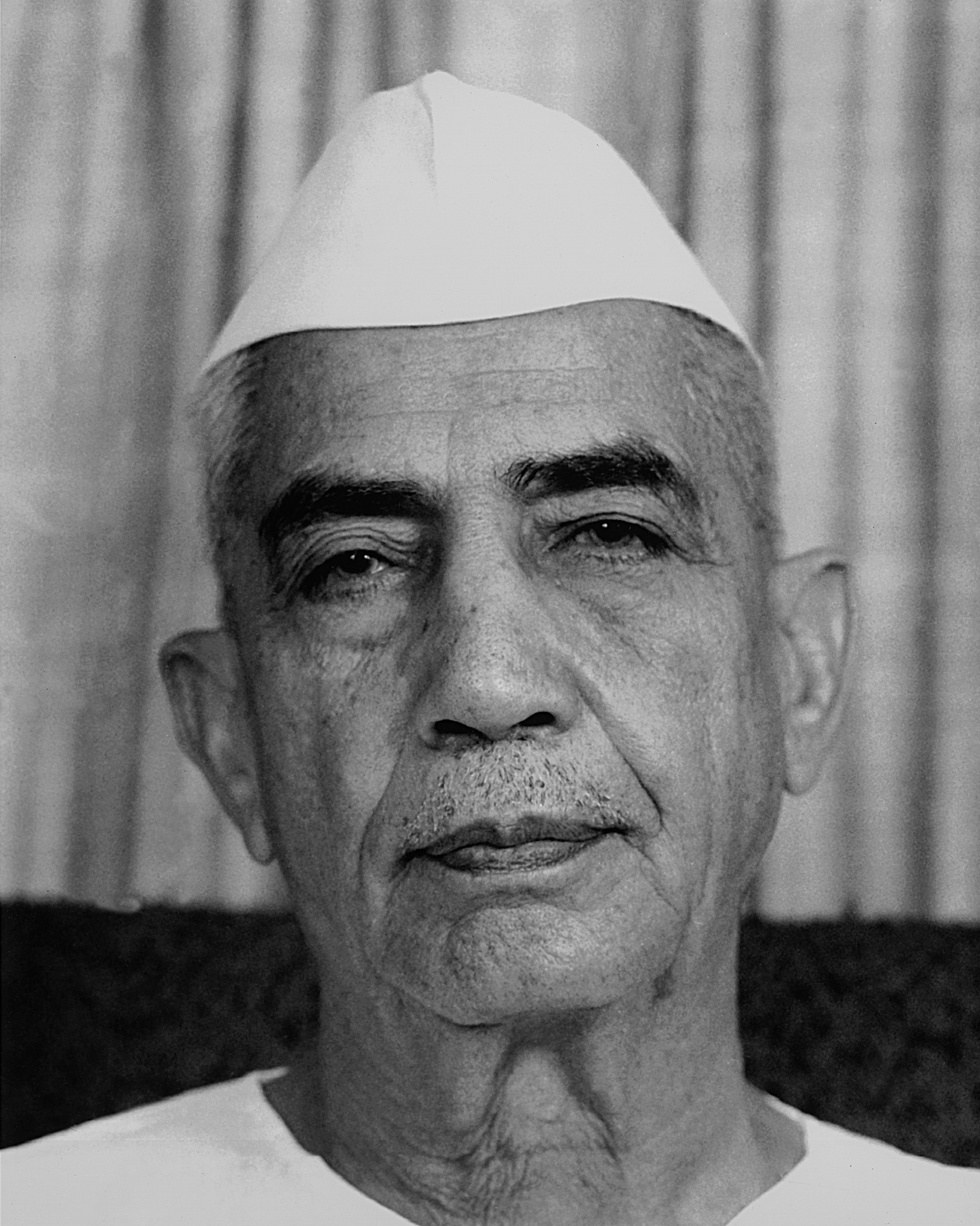

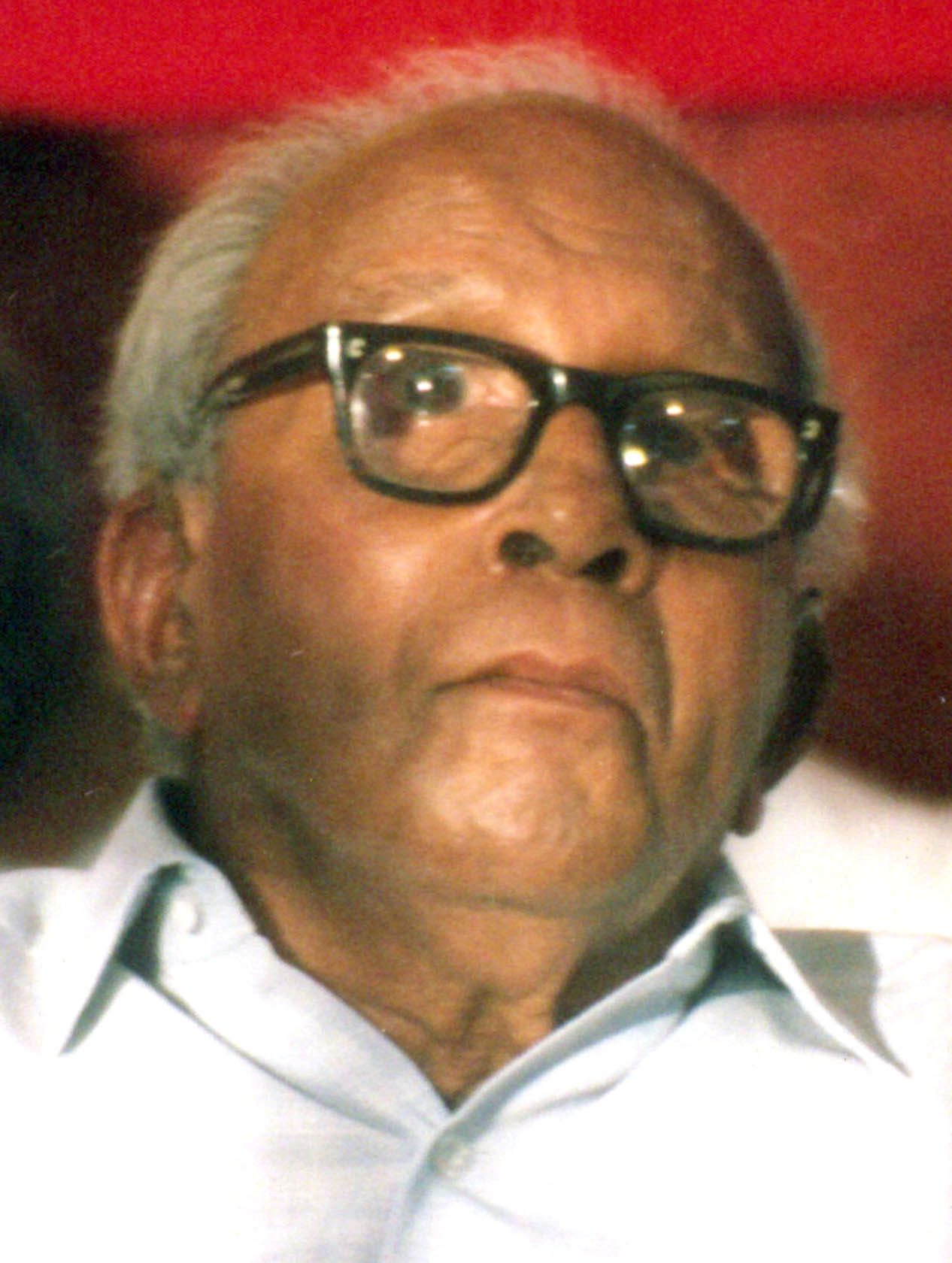

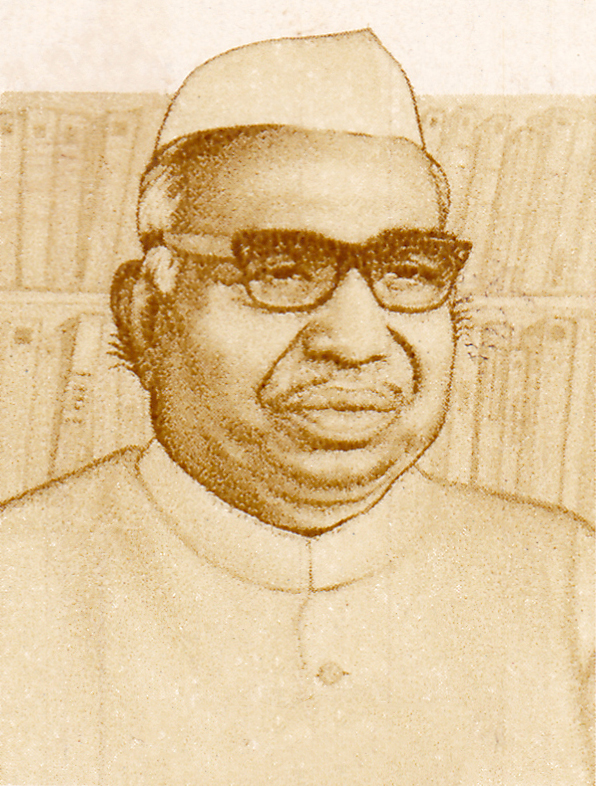

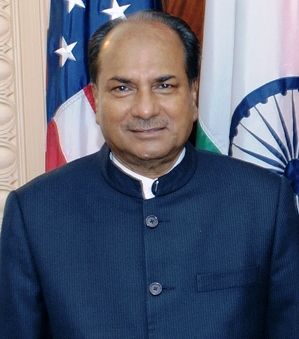
| | First party | Second party | Third party |
|---|---|---|---|
| Leader | Indira Gandhi | Charan Singh | E. M. S. Namboodiripad |
| Party | INC(I) | JP(S) | CPI(M) |
| Alliance | INC (I)+ | | LF |
| Last election | 34.55%, 154 seats | – | 4.29%, 22 seats |
| Seats won | 353 | 41 | 37 |
| Seat change | ▲199 | New | ▲15 |
| Popular vote | 84,455,313 | 18,574,696 | 12,352,331 |
| Percentage | 42.69% | 9.39% | 6.24% |
| Swing | ▲8.17pp | New | ▲1.95pp |
| | Fourth party | Fifth party |
| Leader | Jagjivan Ram | A. K. Antony |
| Party | JP | INC(U) |
| Alliance | JP+ |
| Last election | 41.32%, 295 seats | – |
| Seats won | 31 | 13 |
| Seat change | ▼264 | New |
| Popular vote | 37,530,228 | 10,449,859 |
| Percentage | 18.97% | 5.28% |
| Swing | ▼22.35pp | New |
- Results by constituency
Prime Minister before election
Charan Singh
JP(S)
Elected Prime Minister
Indira Gandhi
INC(I)

General elections were held in India on 3 and 6 January 1980 to elect the member of the seventh Lok Sabha. Indian National Congress (Indira), led by Indira Gandhi, won landslide victory in the election, winning 353 seats.

== Background ==
The Janata Party alliance came into power in the 1977 general elections amidst public anger with the Indian National Congress (R) and the Emergency. However, its position was weak; the loose coalition barely held on to a majority with only 295 seats in the Lok Sabha and never quite had a firm grip on power. Bharatiya Lok Dal leaders Charan Singh and Jagjivan Ram, who had quit the Congress, were members of the Janata alliance but were at loggerheads with Prime Minister Morarji Desai. The Janata Party, an amalgam of socialists and Hindu nationalists, split in 1979 when several coalition members including the Bharatiya Lok Dal of Charan Singh and several members of the Socialist Party withdrew support for the government. Subsequently, Desai lost a vote of confidence in parliament and resigned.

Charan Singh, who had retained some partners of the Janata alliance, was sworn in as prime minister in June 1979. The Indian National Congress (Indira), which succeeded the Indian National Congress (Requisition) from 1978 promised to support Singh in parliament but later backed out just two days before the Government was scheduled to prove its majority on the floor of Lok Sabha. Charan Singh, forced to resign, called for elections in January 1980 and is the only prime minister of India never to have obtained the confidence of Parliament.

In the run up to the general elections, Indira Gandhi's leadership faced a formidable political challenge from a galaxy of regional satraps and prominent leaders of Janata party like Satyendra Narayan Sinha and Karpuri Thakur in Bihar, Ramakrishna Hegde in Karnataka, Sharad Pawar in Maharashtra, Devi Lal in Haryana & Biju Patnaik in Orissa. Janata Party contested the election with Jagjivan Ram as its prime ministerial candidate. However, internal feud between Janata Party leaders and the political instability in the country worked in favour of Indira Gandhi's Congress (I), that reminded voters of the strong government of Indira Gandhi during campaigning.

== Results ==
| Party | Votes | % | Seats | +/– |
|---|---|---|---|---|
| Indian National Congress (Indira) | 84,455,313 | 42.69 | 353 | +199 |
| Janata Party | 37,530,228 | 18.97 | 31 | –264 |
| Janata Party (Secular) | 18,574,696 | 9.39 | 41 | New |
| Communist Party of India (Marxist) | 12,352,331 | 6.24 | 37 | +15 |
| Indian National Congress (Urs) | 10,449,859 | 5.28 | 13 | New |
| Communist Party of India | 4,927,342 | 2.49 | 10 | +3 |
| All India Anna Dravida Munnetra Kazhagam | 4,674,064 | 2.36 | 2 | –16 |
| Dravida Munnetra Kazhagam | 4,236,537 | 2.14 | 16 | +14 |
| Shiromani Akali Dal | 1,396,412 | 0.71 | 1 | –8 |
| Revolutionary Socialist Party | 1,285,517 | 0.65 | 4 | 0 |
| All India Forward Bloc | 1,011,564 | 0.51 | 3 | 0 |
| Jammu & Kashmir National Conference | 493,143 | 0.25 | 3 | +1 |
| Indian Union Muslim League | 475,507 | 0.24 | 2 | 0 |
| Peasants and Workers Party of India | 470,567 | 0.24 | 0 | –5 |
| Republican Party of India (Khobragade) | 383,022 | 0.19 | 0 | –2 |
| Kerala Congress | 356,997 | 0.18 | 1 | –1 |
| Republican Party of India | 351,987 | 0.18 | 0 | 0 |
| Socialist Unity Centre of India | 307,224 | 0.16 | 0 | 0 |
| Jharkhand Party | 254,520 | 0.13 | 1 | +1 |
| All India Muslim League | 196,820 | 0.10 | 0 | 0 |
| United Democratic Front | 140,210 | 0.07 | 0 | –1 |
| Shiv Sena | 129,351 | 0.07 | 0 | New |
| Maharashtrawadi Gomantak Party | 127,188 | 0.06 | 1 | 0 |
| Tripura Upajati Juba Samiti | 111,953 | 0.06 | 0 | 0 |
| People's Party of Arunachal | 69,810 | 0.04 | 0 | New |
| Akhil Bharatiya Ram Rajya Parishad | 61,161 | 0.03 | 0 | 0 |
| Peoples Conference | 53,891 | 0.03 | 0 | New |
| Manipur Peoples Party | 49,277 | 0.02 | 0 | 0 |
| Indian Socialist Party | 39,399 | 0.02 | 0 | New |
| Shoshit Samaj Dal (Akhil Bharatiya) | 38,226 | 0.02 | 0 | 0 |
| Sikkim Janata Parishad | 31,750 | 0.02 | 1 | New |
| Muslim Majlis | 26,363 | 0.01 | 0 | New |
| All India Labour Party | 14,720 | 0.01 | 0 | 0 |
| All Party Hill Leaders Conference | 13,058 | 0.01 | 0 | New |
| Sikkim Congress (Revolutionary) | 11,632 | 0.01 | 0 | New |
| Sikkim Prajatantra Congress | 5,125 | 0.00 | 0 | New |
| Independents | 12,717,510 | 6.43 | 9 | 0 |
| Appointed Anglo-Indians | | | 2 | 0 |
| Total | 197,824,274 | 100.00 | 531 | –13 |
| Valid votes | 197,824,274 | 97.57 | | |
| Invalid/blank votes | 4,928,619 | 2.43 | | |
| Total votes | 202,752,893 | 100.00 | | |
| Registered voters/turnout | 356,205,329 | 56.92 | | |
Source: ECI

=== Results by state/union territory ===
| State/Union Territory | Seats | INC(I) | JP(S) | LFT | JNP | OTH |
|---|---|---|---|---|---|---|
| A & N Islands | 1 | 1 | 0 | 0 | 0 | 0 |
| Andhra Pradesh | 42 | 41 | 0 | 0 | 0 | 1 |
| Arunachal Pradesh | 2 | 2 | 0 | 0 | 0 | 0 |
| Assam | 2 | 2 | 0 | 0 | 0 | 0 |
| Bihar | 54 | 30 | 5 | 4 | 8 | 7 |
| Chandigarh | 1 | 1 | 0 | 0 | 0 | 0 |
| Dadra and Nagar Haveli | 1 | 1 | 0 | 0 | 0 | 0 |
| Goa, Daman and Diu | 2 | 0 | 0 | 0 | 0 | 2 |
| Gujarat | 26 | 25 | 0 | 0 | 1 | 0 |
| Haryana | 10 | 5 | 4 | 0 | 1 | 0 |
| Himachal Pradesh | 4 | 4 | 0 | 0 | 0 | 0 |
| Jammu & Kashmir | 6 | 1 | 0 | 0 | 0 | 5 |
| Karnataka | 28 | 27 | 0 | 0 | 1 | 0 |
| Kerala | 20 | 5 | 0 | 8 | 0 | 7 |
| Lakshadweep | 1 | 0 | 0 | 0 | 0 | 1 |
| Madhya Pradesh | 40 | 35 | 0 | 0 | 4 | 1 |
| Maharashtra | 48 | 39 | 0 | 0 | 8 | 1 |
| Manipur | 2 | 1 | 0 | 1 | 0 | 0 |
| Meghalaya | 1 | 1 | 0 | 0 | 0 | 0 |
| Mizoram | 1 | 0 | 0 | 0 | 0 | 1 |
| Nagaland | 1 | 0 | 0 | 0 | 0 | 1 |
| Delhi | 7 | 6 | 0 | 0 | 1 | 0 |
| Orissa | 21 | 20 | 1 | 0 | 0 | 0 |
| Pondicherry | 1 | 1 | 0 | 0 | 0 | 0 |
| Punjab | 13 | 12 | 0 | 0 | 0 | 1 |
| Rajasthan | 25 | 18 | 2 | 0 | 4 | 1 |
| Sikkim | 1 | 0 | 0 | 0 | 0 | 1 |
| Tamil Nadu | 39 | 20 | 0 | 0 | 0 | 19 |
| Tripura | 2 | 0 | 0 | 2 | 0 | 0 |
| Uttar Pradesh | 85 | 51 | 29 | 1 | 3 | 1 |
| West Bengal | 42 | 4 | 0 | 38 | 0 | 0 |
| Total | 529 | 353 | 41 | 54 | 31 | 50 |

- NOTE: LFT (Left Front) consisted of CPI(M), CPI, RSP and AIFB

== See also ==
- List of members of the 7th Lok Sabha
- 1980 Indian general election by state or union territory
