= Karnataka Vikas Party =

Indian political party

Karnataka Vikas Party (Karnataka Development Party), was a regional political party in Karnataka, India. It was formed by Sarekoppa Bangarappa, the former chief minister of Karnataka, in 1972 when he left the Indian National Congress. KVP was later merged with the Congress again. He also started Karnataka Congress Party in 1994 and later merged it with Congress in December 1996.

== See also ==
- Indian National Congress breakaway parties
