= Bharatiya Janata Party – Karnataka =

Karnataka affiliate of the Bharatiya Janata Party

- President: B. Y. Vijayendra (State)
- Chairman: R. Ashoka (Assembly); Chalavadi Narayanaswamy (Council)
- Founder: Atal Bihari Vajpayee; Lal Krishna Advani; Murli Manohar Joshi; Nanaji Deshmukh; K. R. Malkani; Sikandar Bakht; Vijay Kumar Malhotra; Vijaya Raje Scindia; Bhairon Singh Shekhawat; Shanta Kumar; Ram Jethmalani; Jagannathrao Joshi
- Headquarters: BJP Bhawan, 11th Cross, Temple Street, Malleshwaram, Bengaluru-560003, Karnataka
- Ideology: Hindutva; Neoliberalism
- Political position: Right-wing to Far-right
- Colours: Saffron
- ECI status: National Party
- Seats in Rajya Sabha: 6 / 12
- Seats in Lok Sabha: 17 / 28
- Seats in Karnataka Legislative Council: 30 / 75
- Seats in Karnataka Legislative Assembly: 63 / 224

Election symbol
- Lotus

Party flag

Website
- karnataka.bjp.org

The Bharatiya Janata Party – Karnataka (BJP Karnataka), also known as the Karnataka BJP, is the affiliate of the Bharatiya Janata Party in the Indian state of Karnataka. The party is based in Bengaluru and is led by chair B. Y. Vijayendra.

== Electoral history ==
BJP contested 110 seats in the January 1983 Karnataka Legislative Assembly election, winning 18 seats and obtained 7.9% of the votes cast across the state. Out of its 110 candidates, 71 lost their deposits. Along with the Andhra Pradesh legislative election there same year, this marked the first major performance of the party in southern India. Nine out of the 18 BJP legislators came from the coastal districts. The influence of BJP in Karnataka was marked by its inability to mobilize support in rural areas, where the Janata Dal leader Ramakrishna Hegde and Abdul Nazir Sab (Hegde's Rural Development Minister) had built a strong network of local Janata Dal leaders through the panchayat system. After the 1983 election the BJP offered some outside support to the Hegde government.

The party suffered a setback in the 1985 Karnataka Legislative Assembly election, only 2 of its 115 candidates were elected. The party obtained 3.7% of the state-wide vote and 100 of its candidates lost their deposits.

The 1980s was characterized by internal strife in the BJP Karnataka unit, as the followers of Ananth Kumar and V. Dhananjay Kumar combatted each other. Ananth Kumar was the secretary of the Karnataka BJP unit 1987–1988. In 1988, trying to overcome the split, B. S. Yediyurappa was chosen as the consensus candidate for the presidency of the BJP Karnataka state unit. BJP contested 119 seats in the 1989 Karnataka Legislative Assembly election, winning four seats and obtaining 4.13% of the votes cast across the state.

BJP obtained 28.8% of the votes in Karnataka in the 1991 Indian general election. This result marked a sharp increase from the 2.5% of the votes that the party had received in the 1989 Indian general election in Karnataka. This time BJP had contested all 28 Lok Sabha seats in the state, winning four. The growth of BJP vote in Karnataka was partially due to the Ram Janmabhoomi campaign and the nationalist discourse of the party.

BJP fielded 223 candidates in the 1994 Karnataka Legislative Assembly election. Ahead of the election the party state unit published a 41-page manifesto, seeking to portray a pragmatic and populist approach of the party with a focus on socio-economic issues rather than communalist discourse. After the 1994 Karnataka Legislative Assembly election, BJP held the role as Leader of Opposition in the assembly for a brief period. The electoral result had an important symbolic meaning for the BJP, who had begun to see Karnataka as its 'gateway' into south India.

By the late 1990s, Karnataka was the sole state in southern India where BJP wasn't a marginal political phenomenon. During this period, the anti-reservation stance of BJP in response to the Mandal Commission had attracted support among higher castes in Karnataka, rather than Hindutva nationalism per se. In 1994, the BJP was a key player in the Hubli Idgah Maidan dispute. The 1999 split in the Janata Dal offered the BJP the possibility to do inroads among Lingayat voters. However, as of the late 1990s the BJP Karnataka state organization remained weak, with the strength of the party concentrated in urban pockets and a few rural pockets (Coorg and the two coastal districts). In the 1998 Lok Sabha parliamentary election, BJP increased its number of seats in Karnataka from six to 13. BJP had contested the election in coalition with Lok Shakti, through which BJP had contested 18 seats and Lok Shakti 10 seats. With Lok Shakti's Hegde campaigning for the BJP, the party was somewhat able to portray a more moderate image and tone down its Hindutva profile.

Just before the 1999 Karnataka Legislative Assembly election, the BJP national leadership forced its Karnataka branch into an alliance with the then governing Janata Dal (United). Thus the party could not benefit from the anti-incumbency wave against the Janata Dal cabinet. The tie-up with the Janata Dal (United) was unpopular among BJP workers in the state. Following the 1999 Karnataka Legislative Assembly election the party obtained the Leader of Opposition role again.

The more significant breakthrough of BJP as a major actor in Karnataka state politics came in 2004. In the 2004 Karnataka Legislative Assembly election, the party won 71 out of 224 seats. Whilst BJP remained organizationally weak in rural Karnataka, it managed to increase its share of vote by attracting Lingayat voters from parts of northern Karnataka. In the 2004 Lok Sabha parliamentary election, BJP won 18 seats from Karnataka. BJP had become the largest party in the state assembly, but could not form a government as the Janata Dal (Secular) and the Congress Party formed a coalition. The JD(S)-Congress coalition, however, suffered internal strife and in 2006 H.D Kumarswami struck a deal with BJP which stipulated that the post of Chief Minister would be given to BJP after a 20-month period. In 2007, when the 20 months had passed, H.D Kumarswami opted to retain the position, sparking outcry and a wave of sympathy towards BJP and B. S. Yediyurappa.

The strength of BJP in Karnataka state politics increased significantly between October 2007 and April 2009. Ahead of the 2008 Karnataka Legislative Assembly election, BJP had emerged as the sole viable alternative to the Janata Dal (S) and the Congress Party in Karnataka state politics. Following the formation of the BJP state government in 2008, there was a wave of attacks on Christian churches in Karnataka. The National Commission for Minorities denounced the BJP state governments for inaction in preventing the attacks. Under pressure from the central government, the BJP state government arrested a number of Shri Ram Sena leaders.

In the 2013 Karnataka Legislative Assembly election, the BJP fell to third place in the state behind the Indian National Congress and Janata Dal (Secular). While the INC won a majority in the Legislative Assembly with 122 seats, the BJP fell to 40 seats.

The decision of the Congress state government to grant minority status to the Lingayats prompted the RSS (a move seen by RSS as "an attempt to divide the Hindus") to take a more active role in supporting the BJP in the 2018 state elections. RSS brought in senior leaders from across the country for the state election campaign. Reportedly some 50,000 RSS cadres campaigned for BJP, as well as some 3,000 Vishwa Hindu Parishad and Bajrang Dal cadres. RSS mobilization for BJP in the electoral campaign was particularly strong in the coastal districts (a stronghold of RSS, but also an area with sizable Christian and Muslim populations).

== Support base ==
For many years, the BJP support base was mainly Brahmins and Jains but in the 1990s it expanded to include Lingayats and Vokkaligas. Most of the party state leadership is either OBCs or Brahmins. By the 2000s, the party had sought support from Dalits utilizing Hindutva as mobilizing factor. The party has support base mainly in the coastal districts of the state especially Udupi and Dakshina Kannada. The party has consistently maintained support in the urban centres of Karnataka.

== Electoral Performance ==
=== Legislative Assembly elections ===
Year	Seats won	+/-	Voteshare (%)	+/- (%)	Outcome|-
1983	18 / 224	▲18	7.93%	–	Outside support for JP
1985	2 / 224	▼16	3.88%	▼4.05%	Opposition
1989	4 / 224	▲2	4.14%	▲0.26%	Opposition
1994	40 / 224	▲36	16.99%	▲12.85%	Opposition
1999	44 / 224	▲4	20.69%	▲3.70%	Opposition
2004	79 / 224	▲35	28.33%	▲7.64%	Opposition, later Government
2008	110 / 224	▲31	33.86%	▲5.53%	Government
2013	40 / 224	▼70	19.89%	▼13.97%	Opposition
2018	104 / 224	▲64	36.22%	▲16.33%	Opposition, later Government
2023	66 / 224	▼38	36.00%	▼0.22%	Opposition

=== Lok Sabha elections ===
Lok Sabha Elections
Year	Lok Sabha	Seats contested	Seats won	(+/-) in seats	% of votes	Vote swing	Popular vote	Outcome
1984	8th	6	0 / 28	Steady	4.68%	4.68	6,31,890	Opposition
1989	9th	5	0 / 28	Steady	2.55%	▼2.13	4,70,307	Opposition
1991	10th	28	4 / 28	▲4	29.28%	▲26.78	45,10,090	Opposition
1996	11th	28	6 / 28	▲2	24.85%	▼4.43	46,49,598	Opposition
1998	12th	18	13 / 28	▲7	26.95%	▲2.10	56,86,151	Government
1999	13th	19	7 / 28	▼6	27.19%	▲0.24	60,77,020	Government
2004	14th	24	18 / 28	▲11	34.77%	▲7.58	87,32,783	Opposition
2009	15th	28	19 / 28	▲1	41.63%	▲6.86	1,02,28,790	Opposition
2014	16th	28	17 / 28	▼2	43.01%	▲1.38	1,33,50,285	Government
2019	17th	27	25 / 28	▲8	51.38%	▲8.37	1,80,53,454	Government
2024	18th	25	17 / 28	▼8	46.06%	▼5.32	1,77,97,699	Government

== Leadership ==
S. Mallikarjunaiah was the vice president of the BJP Karnataka state unit between 1980 and 1986. He again held the post as BJP Karnataka state unit vice president 1990–1991.

Nalin Kumar Kateel was appointed as the president of the Karnataka state unit of BJP on 20 August 2019. Reportedly the outgoing president B. S. Yediyurappa had favoured Arvind Limbavali for the post, but the National General Secretary (Organisation) of the party B.L. Santosh had favoured Kateel due to his credentials as a RSS loyalist. Soon after taking over as state unit president Kateel named Bhanuprakash and Nirmal Kumar Surana as Vice Presidents of the BJP state unit. The two leaders, seen as part of the 'old guard' of the party, had been ousted from the state leadership in 2016.

=== List of chief ministers ===
No	Portrait	Name	Constituency	Term of office			Assembly
1		B. S. Yediyurappa	Shikaripura	12 November 2007	19 November 2007	7 days	12th
1		B. S. Yediyurappa	Shikaripura	30 May 2008	4 August 2011	3 years, 66 days	13th
2		D. V. Sadananda Gowda	MLC	5 August 2011	11 July 2012	341 days	13th
3		Jagadish Shettar	Hubli-Dharwad Central	12 July 2012	12 May 2013	304 days	13th
(1)		B. S. Yediyurappa	Shikaripura	17 May 2018	23 May 2018	6 days	15th
(1)		B. S. Yediyurappa	Shikaripura	26 July 2019	28 July 2021	2 years, 2 days (total 5 years, 81 days)	15th
4		Basavaraj Bommai	Shiggaon	28 July 2021	15 May 2023	1 year, 291 days	15th

=== List of deputy chief ministers ===
No	Portrait	Name	Constituency	Term of office			Chief Minister
1		B. S. Yediyurappa	Shikaripura	3 February 2006	8 October 2007	1 year, 247 days	H. D. Kumaraswamy
2		K. S. Eshwarappa	Shimoga	12 July 2012	12 May 2013	304 days	Jagadish Shettar
2		R. Ashoka	Padmanaba Nagar	12 July 2012	12 May 2013	304 days	Jagadish Shettar
3		C. N. Ashwath Narayan	Malleshwaram	20 August 2019	26 July 2021	1 year, 340 days	B. S. Yediyurappa
3		Laxman Savadi	MLC	20 August 2019	26 July 2021	1 year, 340 days	B. S. Yediyurappa
3		Govind Karjol	Mudhole	20 August 2019	26 July 2021	1 year, 340 days	B. S. Yediyurappa

=== Opposition leaders in Legislative Assembly ===
No	Portrait	Name	Constituency	Term of office			Assembly	Chief Minister
1		B. S. Yediyurappa	Shikaripura	27 December 1994	18 December 1996	1 year, 357 days	10th	H. D. Deve Gowda; J. H. Patel
2		Jagadish Shettar	Hubli-Dharwad Central	26 October 1999	23 February 2004	4 years, 120 days	11th	S. M. Krishna
(1)		B. S. Yediyurappa	Shikaripura	9 June 2004	2 February 2006	1 year, 238 days	12th	Dharam Singh
(2)		Jagadish Shettar	Hubli-Dharwad Central	23 January 2014	17 May 2018	4 years, 120 days	14th	Siddaramaiah
(1)		B. S. Yediyurappa	Shikaripura	25 May 2018	26 July 2019	1 year, 62 days	15th	H. D. Kumaraswamy
Interim		Basavaraj Bommai	Shiggaon	4 July 2023	17 November 2023	136 days		
3		R. Ashoka	Padmanaba Nagar	17 November 2023	incumbent	2 years, 330 days	16th	Siddaramaiah

=== Opposition leaders in Legislative Council ===
No	Portrait	Name	Term of office			Chief Minister
1		D. H. Shankaramurthy	8 July 2002	16 June 2004	3 years, 138 days	S. M. Krishna
1		D. H. Shankaramurthy	16 June 2004	23 November 2005	3 years, 138 days	Dharam Singh
2		D. V. Sadananda Gowda	17 May 2013	24 May 2014	1 year, 7 days	Siddaramaiah
3		K. S. Eshwarappa	13 July 2014	17 May 2018	3 years, 308 days	Siddaramaiah
4		Kota Srinivas Poojary	2 July 2018	26 July 2019	1 year, 24 days	H. D. Kumaraswamy
4		Kota Srinivas Poojary	25 December 2023	4 June 2024	162 days	Siddaramaiah
5		Chalavadi Narayanaswamy	29 June 2024	incumbent	2 years, 106 days	Siddaramaiah

=== List of presidents ===
No	Name	Period		
1	A.K.Subbaiah	1980	1983	3 years
2	B. B. Shivappa	1983	1988	5 years
3	B. S. Yediyurappa	1988	1991	3 years
4	K.S. Eshwarappa	1993	1998	5 years
(3)	B. S. Yediyurappa	1998	1999	1 year
5	Basavaraj Patil Sedam	2000	2003	3 years
6	Ananth Kumar	2003	2004	1 year
7	Jagadish Shettar	2004	2006	2 years
8	D. V. Sadananda Gowda	2006	2010	4 years
(4)	K. S. Eshwarappa	28 January 2010	21 March 2013	3 years, 52 days
9	Pralhad Joshi	21 March 2013	8 April 2016	3 years, 18 days
(3)	B. S. Yediyurappa	8 April 2016	20 August 2019	3 years, 134 days
10	Nalin Kumar Kateel	20 August 2019	10 November 2023	4 years, 82 days
11	B. Y. Vijayendra	10 November 2023	present	2 years, 337 days

== Operation Kamala ==
Operation Kamala, also known as Operation Lotus is a term coined in 2008, when India's former minister G. Janardhana Reddy in the state of Karnataka, used various strategies to secure support from legislators bypassing the anti-defection law, so as to take the Bharatiya Janata Party (BJP) past the majority number. Operation Lotus refers to the "poaching" of MLAs and MPs of other parties by the BJP, mainly of their rival the Indian National Congress party (INC), often to form government in states where they do not have the majority.

=== 2008 ===
The BJP won 110 seats in the assembly elections in May 2008, falling three seats short of a simple majority. With the backing of six independents, Yeddyurappa took the oath of office as chief minister to establish the first BJP administration in south India. The BJP scored five victories in the by-elections, bringing its total in the 224-member assembly to 115. Operation Kamala eventually became the name of the entire exercise.

The MLAs who switched parties during the Operation Kamala and resigned are J. Narasimha Swamy, Anand Asnotikar, Jaggesh, Balachandra Jarkiholi, K. Shivanagouda Naik. Umesh Katti and D. C. Gourishankar.

=== 2019 ===
Ramesh Jarkiholi organized 14 other Congress MLAs to resign their posts. Ramesh Jarkiholi was one of the 15 MLAs from Congress and 2 from JD(S) who resigned in July 2019, bringing down the HDK Congress-JD(S) coalition and allowing B.S. Yeddyurappa (BSY) to return to power. After Supreme Court ruling held up their disqualification but allowed them to run, Jarkiholi joined BJP along with all other rebels inducted by Yeddyurappa and other important persons.

Investigations

- On 31 March 2021, the bench of Justice D'Cunha refused to quash the FIR against the sitting Chief Minister of Karnataka B. S. Yediyurappa in a case nicknamed Operation Kamala case. At the time of the alleged incident, Yediyurappa was the leader of opposition.

Reactions

- In an interview with Deccan Herald in March 2019, B. S. Yediyurappa said "Operation Kamala was not wrong and I don't regret it. It is part of democracy."
- H. D. Kumaraswamy alleged that the BJP used Operation Kamala to affect the defections of MLAs from his government, causing it to fall.

== See also ==
- Bharatiya Janata Party – Gujarat
- Bharatiya Janata Party – Maharashtra
- Bharatiya Janata Party – West Bengal
- Bharatiya Janata Party – Tamil Nadu
- Bharatiya Janata Party – Uttar Pradesh
- Bharatiya Janata Party – Madhya Pradesh
- State units of the Bharatiya Janata Party
