= B. S. Yediyurappa =

Former Chief Minister of Karnataka (born 1943)

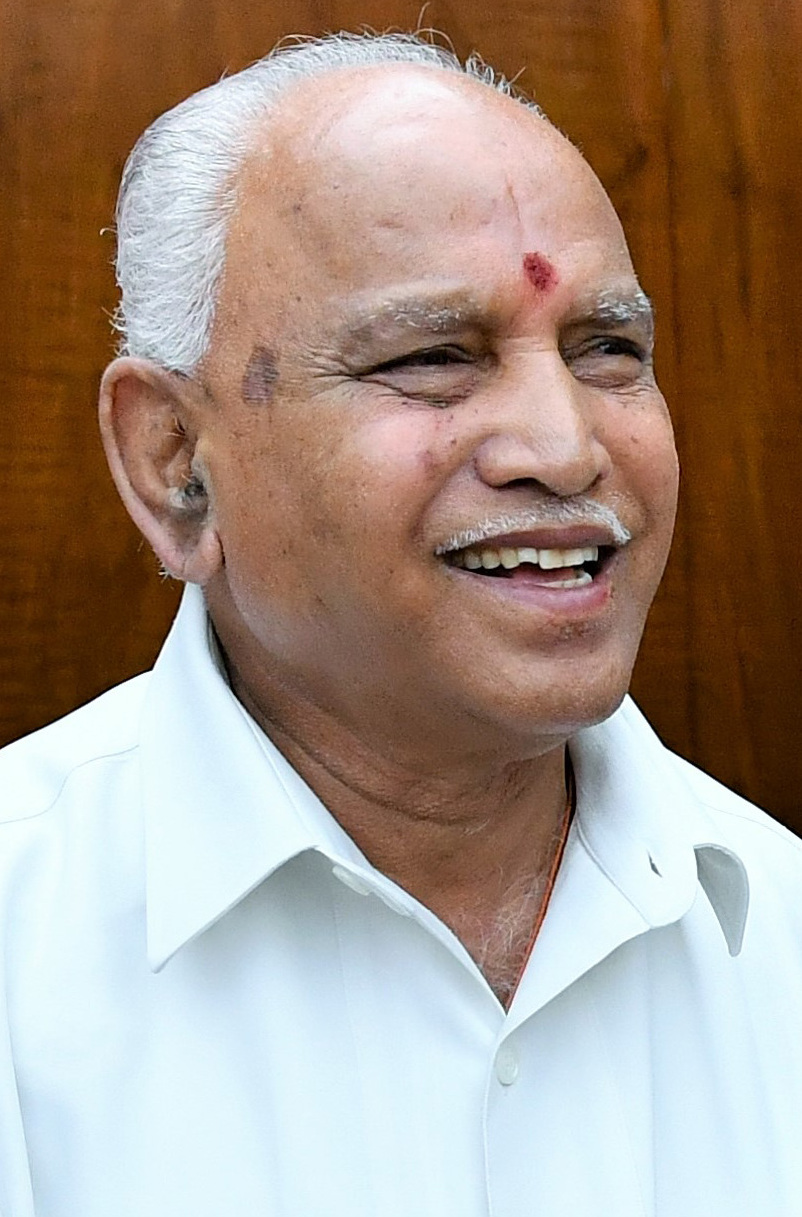

13th Chief Minister of Karnataka
- In office 26 July 2019 – 28 July 2021
- Governor: Vajubhai Vala
- Preceded by: H. D. Kumaraswamy
- Succeeded by: Basavaraj Bommai
- In office 17 May 2018 – 23 May 2018
- Governor: Vajubhai Vala
- Preceded by: Siddaramaiah
- Succeeded by: H. D. Kumaraswamy
- In office 30 May 2008 – 4 August 2011
- Governor: Rameshwar Thakur
- Preceded by: President's rule
- Succeeded by: D. V. Sadananda Gowda
- In office 12 November 2007 – 19 November 2007
- Governor: T. N. Chaturvedi
- Preceded by: President's rule
- Succeeded by: President's rule

Deputy Chief Minister of Karnataka
- In office 3 February 2006 – 8 October 2007
- Governor: T. N. Chaturvedi
- Chief Minister: H. D. Kumaraswamy
- Ministry Portfolios: Minister of Finance; Minister of Excise; Minister of Large & Medium Industries
- Preceded by: M. P. Prakash
- Succeeded by: R. Ashoka; K. S. Eshwarappa

Member of Parliament, Lok Sabha
- In office 16 May 2014 – 19 May 2018
- Preceded by: B. Y. Raghavendra
- Succeeded by: B. Y. Raghavendra
- Constituency: Shimoga

Leader of Opposition Karnataka Legislative Assembly
- In office 27 December 1994 – 18 December 1996
- Chief Minister(s): H. D. Deve Gowda; J. H. Patel
- Preceded by: R. V. Deshpande
- Succeeded by: Mallikarjun Kharge
- In office 9 June 2004 – 2 February 2006
- Chief Minister: Dharam Singh
- Preceded by: Jagadish Shettar
- Succeeded by: Dharam Singh
- In office 25 May 2018 – 26 July 2019
- Chief Minister: H. D. Kumaraswamy
- Preceded by: Jagadish Shettar
- Succeeded by: Siddaramaiah

Member of Karnataka Legislative Assembly
- In office 16 May 2018 – 13 May 2023
- Preceded by: B. Y. Raghavendra
- Succeeded by: B. Y. Vijayendra
- Constituency: Shikaripura
- In office 13 May 2004 – 16 May 2014
- Preceded by: B. N. Mahalingappa
- Succeeded by: B. Y. Raghavendra
- Constituency: Shikaripura
- In office 1983–1999
- Preceded by: K. Yenkatappa
- Succeeded by: B. N. Mahalingappa
- Constituency: Shikaripura

Member of Karnataka Legislative Council
- In office 18 June 2000 – 17 May 2004
- Constituency: Elected by Legislative Assembly members

President of Bharatiya Janata Party, Karnataka
- In office 8 April 2016 – 26 July 2019
- Preceded by: Pralhad Joshi
- Succeeded by: Nalin Kumar Kateel
- In office 1998–1999
- Preceded by: K. S. Eshwarappa
- Succeeded by: Ananth Kumar
- In office 1988–1992
- Preceded by: B. B. Shivappa
- Succeeded by: K. S. Eshwarappa

Personal details
- Born: Bookanakere Siddalingappa Yediyurappa; 27 February 1943 (age 83) Bookanakere, Kingdom of Mysore, British India (present–day Karnataka, India)
- Party: Bharatiya Janata Party (1980–2012; 2014–present)
- Other political affiliations: Karnataka Janata Paksha (2012–2014); Janata Party (1977–1980); Bharatiya Jana Sangh (till 1977)
- Spouse: Mythradevi (m. 1967; died 2004)
- Children: 5, including B. Y. Raghavendra and B. Y. Vijayendra
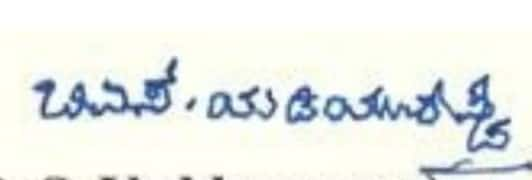
- Signature

Bookanakere Siddalingappa Yediyurappa // (born 27 February 1943), also known as B.S. Yediyurappa or BSY, is an Indian politician who served four terms as the chief minister of Karnataka from 2007 to 2022 as a member of the Karnataka Legislative Assembly, though his tenure was not continuous.

In 2008, Yediyurappa resumed office as the Chief Minister of Karnataka after leading the BJP to victory in the legislative assembly elections, marking the first time the party formed a state government in South India. In 2011, he resigned after being indicted in a corruption case. The case was progressively dismissed between 2012 and 2016 following High Court rulings. In 2012, alleging ill-treatment by the BJP high command, Yediyurappa left the party to establish his own political party, the Karnataka Janata Paksha (KJP).

In 2014, he merged the KJP with the BJP and was subsequently elected to the 16th Lok Sabha from the Shimoga constituency. He later resigned from the Lok Sabha following the Karnataka Legislative Assembly state election held in 2018, after which he was sworn in as Chief Minister of Karnataka for the third time. However, he failed to secure a majority in the Assembly and resigned two days later. H. D. Kumaraswamy subsequently took the oath as Chief Minister. In July 2019, the Kumaraswamy government lost its majority following the resignation of 17 MLAs. Yediyurappa was soon elected as the chief minister and consolidated his majority in the by-elections later that year.

Yediyurappa resigned from office on 26 July 2021, on the second anniversary of his fourth term. He was succeeded by Basavaraj Bommai on 28 July 2021.

== Personal life ==
Yediyurappa was born on 27 February 1943 in the village of Bookanakere, located in the Mandya district of the former Kingdom of Mysore, then part of British India. His parents were Siddalingappa and Puttathayamma. His mother died when he was four. He completed his pre-university college education at the Government College in Mandya, affiliated with the University of Mysore.

Since his youth, Yediyurappa has been affiliated with the Rashtriya Swayamsevak Sangh (RSS), a right-wing Hindu nationalist organisation, as well as the Bharatiya Jana Sangh, a Hindu nationalist political party which was the political arm of the RSS and the precursor to the BJP.

In 1965, Yediyurappa moved to Shikaripura, where he began working as a clerk at a relative's rice mill. In 1967, Yediyurappa married Mythradevi, the daughter of a rice mill owner. He has two sons, B. Y. Raghavendra and B. Y. Vijayendra, and three daughters: Arunadevi, Padmavati and Umadevi. Mythradevi died in 2004.

In 2007, he changed the spelling of his name from "Yediyurappa" to "Yeddyurappa", following the advice of his astrologers. He later returned to the original spelling, Yediyurappa, before the oath-taking ceremony of his fourth term as chief minister of Karnataka in 2019. In 2020 and 2021, he contracted COVID-19 but recovered soon afterwards.

== Political career ==
=== Early political career ===
Since his youth, B.S. Yediyurappa has been affiliated with the Rashtriya Swayamsevak Sangh (RSS), a right-wing Hindu nationalist organisation, as well as the Bharatiya Jana Sangh, a Hindu nationalist political party that was the political arm of the RSS and the precursor to the Bharatiya Janata Party.

=== Early political career and local offices (1972–1988) ===
In 1972, Yediyurappa was elected to the Shikaripura Town Municipality and appointed president of the Jana Sangh Taluk unit. He became president of the town municipality in 1975 and was later imprisoned in Ballari and Shimoga during the Emergency. He served as president of the Shikaripura taluk unit of the BJP in 1980, the Shimoga district unit in 1985, and the Karnataka state unit in 1988. First elected to the Karnataka Legislative Assembly in 1983, he represented Shikaripur for six terms. He served as Leader of the Opposition following the 1994 elections and again in 2004. Between these terms, he was a member of the Karnataka Legislative Council from 2000 to 2004.

=== Coalition government with JD(S) and deputy chief ministership (2006–2007) ===
During his first tenure in government, Yediyurappa supported Janata Dal (Secular) leader H. D. Kumaraswamy in bringing down the coalition government led by Dharam Singh and forming a new administration in partnership with the BJP. As part of the agreement between the JD(S) and BJP, it was decided that H. D. Kumaraswamy would serve as chief minister for the first 20 months, followed by Yediyurappa for the subsequent 20 months. In the Kumaraswamy-led government, Yediyurappa held the positions of Deputy Chief Minister and Finance Minister.

=== Breakdown of coalition and brief chief ministership (2007) ===
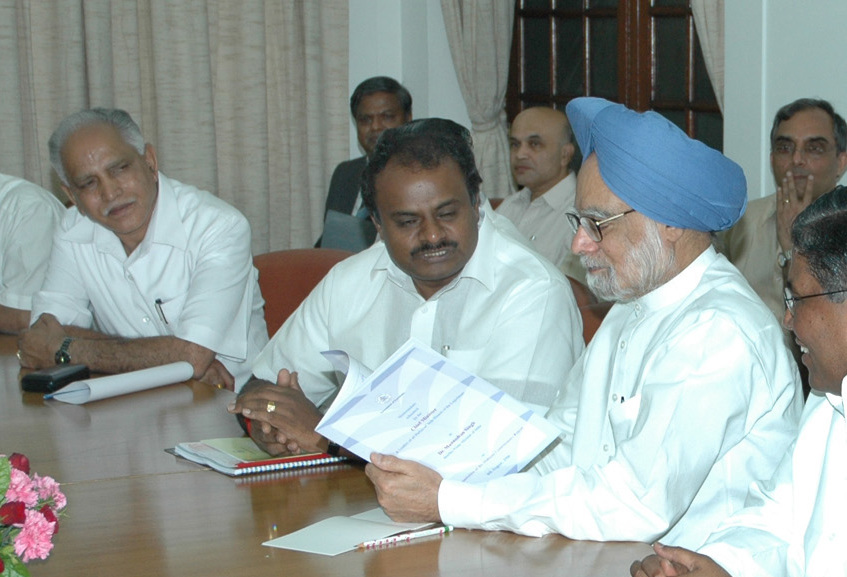
Yediyurappa and Kumaraswamy during the coalition government with JDS in 2006

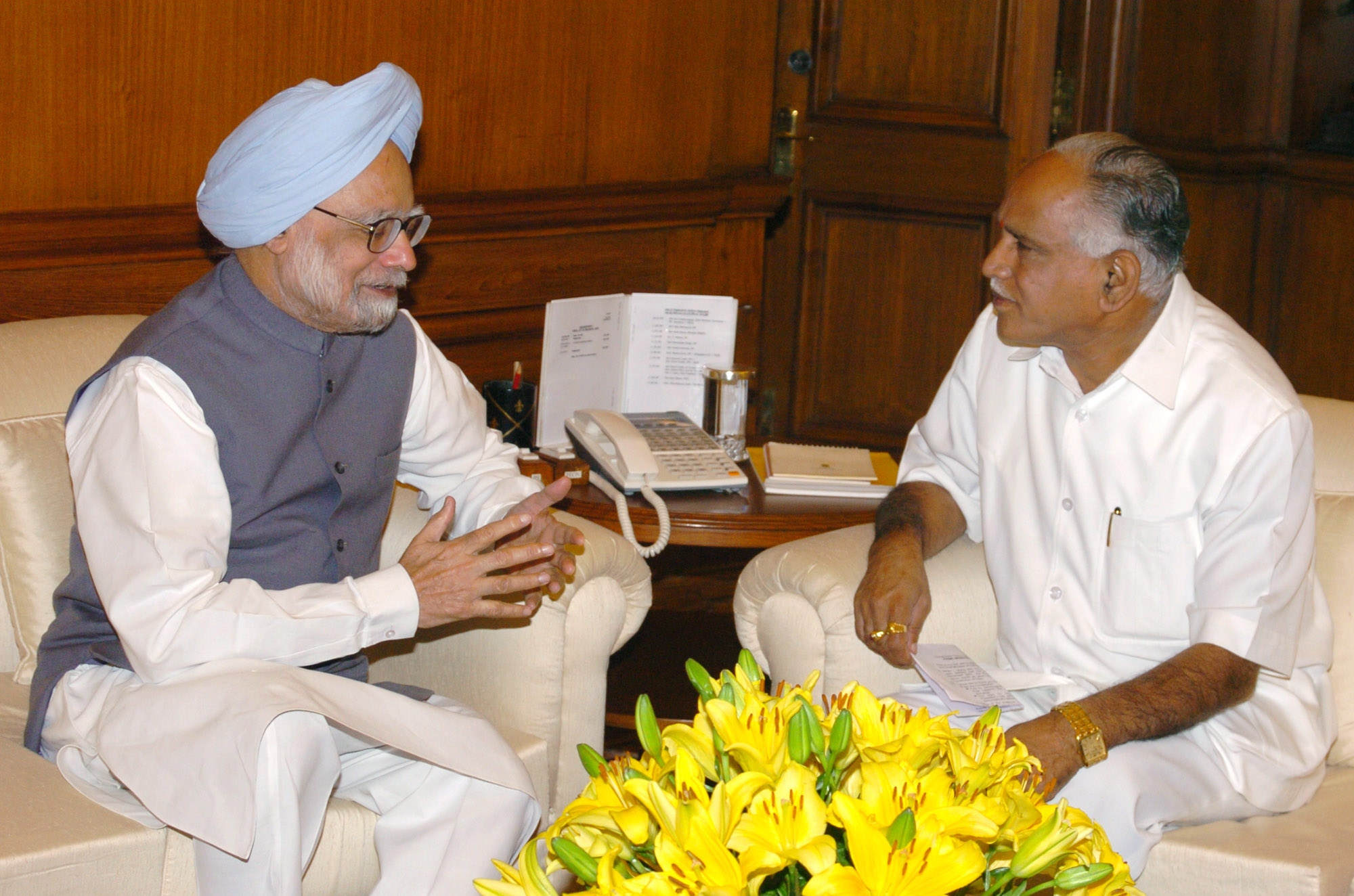
Yediyurappa calls on the then Prime Minister of India Manmohan Singh

In October 2007, when it was Yediyurappa's turn to become chief minister, Kumaraswamy refused to relinquish his post. As a result, Yediyurappa and ministers from his party resigned, and on 5 October, the BJP formally withdrew its support to the Kumaraswamy government. Karnataka came briefly under President's rule, but Yediyurappa was sworn in as chief minister of Karnataka on 12 November 2007 after the JD(S) and BJP reached an agreement. However, JD(S) disagreed over the sharing of ministries and resigned as chief minister on 19 November 2007.

=== Assembly election and first full term as chief minister (2008–2011) ===
In Karnataka's 2008 Assembly elections, Yediyurappa contested from Shikaripura against former chief minister S. Bangarappa of the Samajwadi Party who was also backed by the Indian National Congress and JD(S). However Yediyurappa won the seat and BJP won state victory, as Karnataka became the gateway for the BJP in south India. He became chief minister on 30 May 2008.

=== Lokayukta investigation and resignation (2011) ===
On 30 July 2011, the Karnataka Lokayukta submitted a report investigating illegal mining in the state, indicting Yediyurappa for illegally profiteering from land deals in Bengaluru and Shimoga, and also in connection with the illegal iron ore export scam in Bellary, Tumkur and Chitradurga districts of Karnataka. Following pressure from the BJP central leadership, he announced his decision to quit, and formally resigned on 31 July 2011. Ananth Kumar, Shobha Karandlaje, Jagadish Shettar and S. Suresh Kumar were in the race to succeed him. He was replaced as chief minister by Sadananda Gowda.

=== Formation of Karnataka Janata Paksha (2012–2013) ===
He resigned his position as a Member of Legislative Assembly and primary membership of the Bharatiya Janata Party on 30 November 2012 and formally launched the Karnataka Janata Paksha. He was elected as an MLA from Shikaripura Constituency (Shimoga district) in May 2013.

=== Return to BJP and parliamentary career (2014–2017) ===
In November 2013, it was announced that he was considering an unconditional return to the BJP. On 2 January 2014 he announced a merger with BJP ahead of 2014 Lok Sabha elections. He won the Shimoga seat of Karnataka in the 2014 Indian general election by a margin of 363,305 votes.

In 2016, the BJP re-appointed him as the President of the Karnataka state BJP unit. He was BJP's chief ministerial candidate in the 2018 Karnataka Legislative Assembly election. However, the party secured 104 seats, falling nine short of a simple majority.

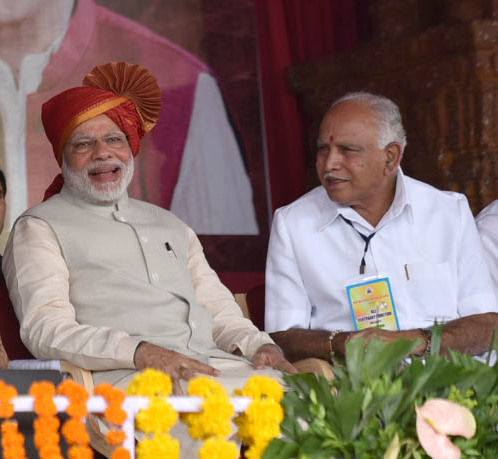
Yediyurappa and Narendra Modi in an inaugural function

During the aftermath of the 2018 Karnataka Legislative assembly elections, Yediyurappa was invited to form the government and become the chief minister by the Governor citing that his party was the largest in the house. He was sworn in on 17 May 2018 by the Governor Vajubhai Vala, becoming the chief minister of Karnataka for the third time. He was given 15 days to prove majority by the governor, but the Supreme Court intervened, ordering a floor test (trust vote) after 24 hours. The trust vote was to be held on 19 May 2018 at 4 pm. Before the trust vote was to begin, Yediyurappa gave an emotional speech and resigned citing that he would be unable to produce a majority. He thus became one of the shortest-serving chief ministers in India with just 2 1/2 days in office.

=== Fourth term and political crisis (2019) ===
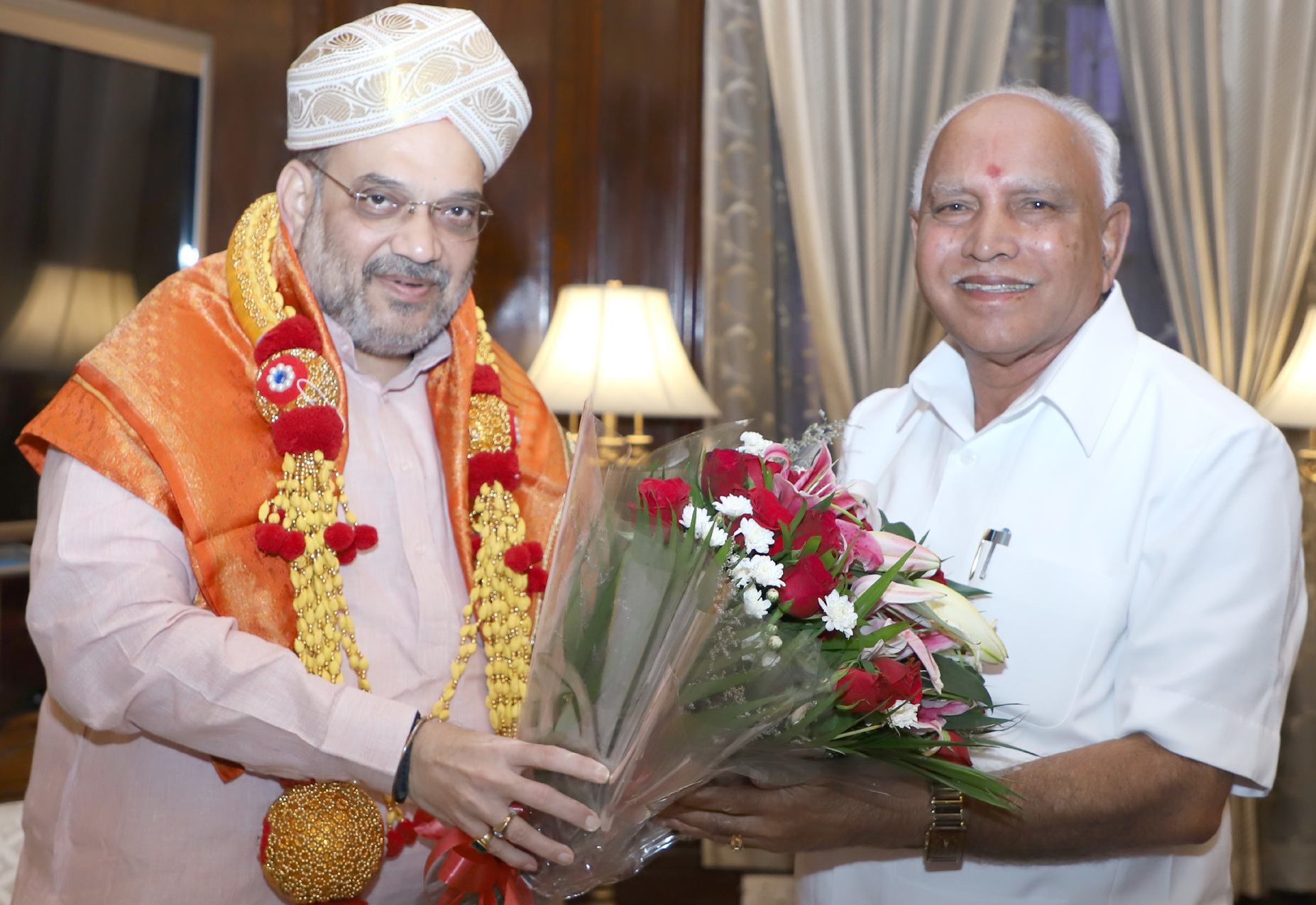
Being the Chief Minister of Karnataka for the 4th time, Yediyurappa greets Union Home Minister Amit Shah in Delhi.

Due to turmoil in the coalition government of JDS and Congress, 16 MLAs submitted their resignation to the government, turning it into a minority. MLA Ramalinga Reddy was convinced to join back the fold. On 23 July 2019, after 18 days of debate, the coalition government stepped down after losing the trust vote, allowing Yediyurappa and the BJP to stake a claim for government formation. Yediyurappa was invited by Karnataka governor Vajubhai Vala on 26 July to form the new government and took an oath as the chief minister of the state for the fourth time.

The by-polls for these 15 out of the 17 constituencies were conducted on 5 December 2019, where all the parties campaigned strongly. Yediyurappa promised the voters that each candidate would be awarded a ministry if the people voted for them. The results were declared on 9 December. BJP and its leader Yediyurappa won 12 out of the 15 contested seats, thereby gaining a full majority, and a total of 117/224 assembly seats in the 2019 Karnataka Legislative Assembly by-elections.

=== Floods (2019) ===
Soon after he took oath as the chief minister, the state was hit by severe floods. During the 2019 Karnataka floods, Karnataka received nearly five times its normal rainfall, adding to the severity of ongoing floods in 12 districts that had killed 20 people by 9 August 2019. Thousands of people were evacuated to relief camps and hundreds were displaced. The Karnataka State Disaster Management Authority and Karnataka Police, along with the Indian Air Force, civilians, volunteers, and fishermen from coastal Karnataka took part in the rescue operations. Yediyurappa visited the affected areas around the state and announced a compensation of ₹5 lakh for the family members of those who died and lost houses in the floods. On 4 October 2019, the Central Government had released an amount of 1200 Crores as Karnataka flood relief funds on the request of Yediyurappa.

=== Economic engagement and international outreach (2020) ===
Early in 2020, Yediyurappa visited Davos accompanying Prime Minister Narendra Modi, and attended the annual meet of World Economic Forum 2020. He, along with the Industries Minister of the state Jagadish Shettar, attracted investments for the Global Investors' Meet to be held in November in the IT-hub of Bangalore. Yediyurappa also led a delegation from Karnataka in the hope of attracting more investors to set up shop or expand their facilities in the state. The chief minister said that the state had received positive response from corporations such as French 3D design company Dassault Systèmes, aircraft maker Lockheed Martin, steelmaker ArcelorMittal, LuLu Group International and pharmaceutical major Novo among others.

=== Legislation and policy initiatives (2020) ===
In December 2020, the Government of Karnataka, under his leadership passed the Anti Cow-Slaughter Bill 2020, with the aim to protect and nurture cattle in the state that were allegedly being slaughtered illegally. The legislation empowered the police to inspect and seize vehicles that transport cattle and the premises where they are slaughtered. The new law brought stern punishment of imprisonment of up to 3 years and a penalty of 50,000 rupees. Amid opposition from the Congress members who staged a walk-out protest, the bill was passed unanimously in the floor of the house and the law came into effect in the state.

=== COVID-19 response (2020–2021) ===
During the COVID-19 pandemic, Karnataka became the first state to open a 10,000-bed COVID-19 hospital and care centre in Bangalore. After a cabinet meet concerning the pandemic, Yediyurappa announced that the Karnataka government would be providing 1 Lakh of aid to BPL families who lost a working person in the first or second wave of the pandemic.

=== Interstate water dispute and Mekedatu project (2021) ===
In July 2021, Yediyurappa assured the start of the Mekedatu project across the river Kaveri, upon the clearance of the objections in the judicial courts. Even though he wrote a letter to the Tamil Nadu chief minister M. K. Stalin mentioning the project and to further cooperate in its smooth movement, Stalin opposed the start of the project, stating concerned issues of his state. Later, Yediyurappa still reassured that no odds can put a halt to the project, stating "Got Every Right To Start Dam Project Across River Cauvery". This led to further disputes between the two neighbouring states based on this issue and also led to mutual protests against each other. The chief minister primarily met the Jal Shakti Abhiyan Minister Gajendra Singh Shekhawat and also flew to New Delhi to meet Narendra Modi and clarify the process of the Mekedatu dam project.

=== Social policy initiatives ===
Under his tenure, Karnataka became the first state in India to provide reservations for transgender communities in all government services. In the final notification issued on 6 July, the government decided to provide 1 per cent horizontal reservation to transgender candidates in government jobs and this is to be filled through direct recruitment under the (General Recruitment) Rule, 1977 to all sectors of social classes.

=== Leadership transition and resignation (2021) ===
With speculations of leadership change in BJP Karnataka for over several months, rumours spread that Yediyurappa would be removed, and a new chief minister would be appointed for the state. Major leaders of the BJP reiterated that the change in leadership will be witnessed soon in the state. This also led to various pro and con discussions among BJP. Various leaders, including leaders from opposition Congress party extended their support widely to Yediyurappa, encouraging him and his leadership for the party. Central leader Subramanian Swamy also opposed any decisions of changing the post of BSY. With the news widespread, various influential seers and monks belonging to the majority Lingayat community and others swarmed in large numbers backing Yediyurappa, urging BJP to let BSY complete his term and warned about fierce protest if at all he was changed. Amid these doubts on 25 July the BJP national president J. P. Nadda slashed out these notions by stating "No crisis in Karnataka, Yediyurappa has done good work".

Later on 26 July 2021, he announced his resignation from the post of chief minister during his speech on the two-year anniversary of his government. He cited the 75-year age-limit rule in BJP. During the speech, he went through memories of his 45-year political career, thanked his party leaders and high command, and submitted his resignation that afternoon, to the Governor of Karnataka.

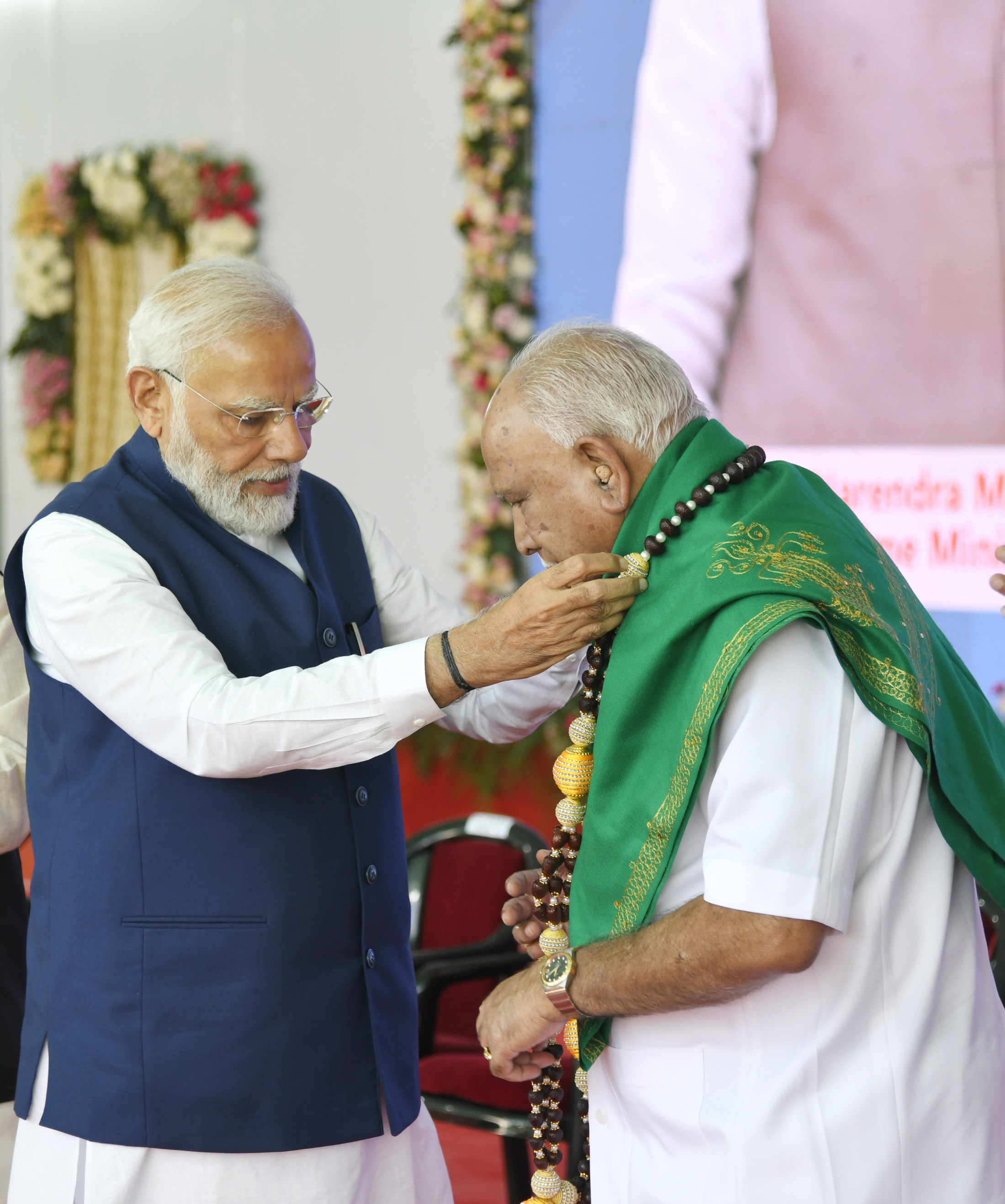
PM at the inauguration of Shivamogga Airport greets Yediyurappa on the occasion of his 80th birthday

=== Later career and retirement (2022–2023) ===
A year later in July 2022, Yediyurappa announced retirement from electoral politics and stated that he would be vacating Shikaripura Assembly constituency in the 2023 Karnataka Legislative Assembly election. He further insisted that his son B. Y. Vijayendra would be contesting for the upcoming legislative elections from the same constituency in Shimoga.

In August 2022, Yediyurappa was elevated to the Central Parliamentary board, of the BJP. He was one of the members of the 11 board committees, which included J. P. Nadda, Narendra Modi, Amit Shah and other prominent members. Yediyurappa stated that he was humbled and would work hard to bring the party to power in the southern states of India.

In February 2023, Yediyurappa made his farewell speech at the Karnataka Legislative assembly as an MLA and reiterated that he would not be contesting in the upcoming elections in 2023. Prime Minister Modi tweeted that it was "inspiring speech to him and every worker of the party".

On 27 February 2023, Narendra Modi greeted and wished Yediyurappa his 80th birthday, heaped praise on his achievements, and also inaugurated the long-demanded Shivamogga Airport in his presence.

In April 2026, despite his retirement from electoral politics, Yediyurappa remained active in party advocacy, publicly supporting the Women's Reservation Bill and criticizing the Karnataka state government's administration regarding utility tariffs.

== Legal issues ==
=== Court cases and subsequent imprisonment ===
In five cases issued in 2011, Yediyurappa was alleged to be responsible for the illegal de-notification of land. He was jailed during this period and convicted of corruption. In 2015, the Karnataka High Court set aside this order, thereby ending the cases against him. After the High Court annulled former Governor H. R. Bhardwaj's sanction to prosecute Yediyurappa, a special Lokayukta court dismissed four other FIRs against him. In a major relief to Yediyurappa and the BJP, the Karnataka High Court set aside the sanction given by then-Governor H. R. Bhardwaj for his prosecution in several cases of alleged illegal de-notification of land and asked the incumbent, Vajubhai Vala, to have a fresh look at it.

The High Court said, "Non-consideration of the relevant matters made the order of sanction illegal and resulted in the failure of justice. We are thus of the opinion that the exercise of the power by the Governor was not in accordance with well-settled principles for sanctioning prosecution. We accordingly set aside the order of sanction, dated 21 January 2011, and remit the matter back to the Governor for reconsideration in the light of our discussions above."

Yediyurappa was arrested on the evening of 15 October 2011, hours after the Lokayukta court issued an arrest warrant in two cases of corruption for illegally revocating land in and around Bangalore. Later, he was granted bail on 8 November 2011 after spending 23 days in jail.

However, in March 2012, the High Court of Karnataka quashed the FIR registered against him regarding the Mining. A division bench of the high court of Karnataka passed the order stating that "Suspicion cannot be a ground to tarnish the image and reputation of a person who is holding a Constitutional post. Even during the course of argument, a specific question was put to Lokayukta counsel to produce any material to connect the petitioner for alleged offences, but he was mum and did not indicate any favours shown by Yediyurappa as the chief minister to any mining company". In May 2012, the Supreme Court, temporarily stayed the case on this matter and ordered an official CBI inquiry, to be completed within three months. On 25 July 2012, Karnataka High Court granted anticipatory bail to Yediyurappa in a case relating to alleged irregularities in revocation of government land in 2009.

Other cases rejected by the Court were:

1. Justice K N Keshavanarayana of High Court quashed the complaint alleging encroachment of land in Bhadra Reserve Forest by Yediyurappa and others on 5 February 2013.
2. Karnataka High Court quashed a case registered against him for irregularities in the Upper Bhadra irrigation project on 10 October 2013.

=== POCSO case (2024–present) ===
On 14 March 2024, a case was registered against Yediyurappa at Sadashivanagar Police Station under the Protection of Children from Sexual Offences Act (POCSO) and Section 354A (sexual harassment) of the Indian Penal Code, following a complaint by the mother of a 17-year-old girl alleging that Yediyurappa sexually assaulted her daughter at his Bengaluru residence on 2 February 2024. The complainant died of lung cancer in May 2024. The case was transferred to the CID, which filed a chargesheet on 27 June 2024 against Yediyurappa and three associates.

The Karnataka High Court stayed his arrest on 14 June 2024. On 7 February 2025, the High Court set aside the trial court's initial cognizance order as "bald, laconic, and cryptic", remanding the matter for reconsideration. The trial court took cognizance again on 28 February 2025. On 13 November 2025, the Karnataka High Court refused to quash the case, upholding the trial court's cognizance order, though directing that Yediyurappa's personal appearance should not be required unless essential. On 2 December 2025, the Supreme Court of India stayed the trial proceedings. Yediyurappa has consistently denied the charges.

=== Operation Kamala ===
Operation Kamala is a term coined in 2008, when former minister G. Janardhana Reddy used a method to secure support from legislators, bypassing the Anti-Defection Law, so as to take BJP past the majority number. In 2018, H. D. Kumaraswamy alleged that the BJP used Operation Kamala to affect the defections of MLAs from his government, causing it to fall.

In an interview with Deccan Herald in March 2019, Yediyurappa said "Operation Kamala was not wrong and I don't regret it. It is part of democracy."

Political offices
Preceded by M.P. Prakash	Deputy Chief Minister of Karnataka; 3 February 2006 – 3 October 2007	Succeeded by R. Ashoka; K. S. Eshwarappa
Preceded by H. D. Kumaraswamy	Chief Minister of Karnataka; 12 November 2007 – 19 November 2007	Succeeded by President's Rule (19 November 2007 – 30 May 2008)
Preceded by President's Rule (19 November 2007 – 30 May 2008)	Chief Minister of Karnataka; 30 May 2008 – 31 July 2011	Succeeded by D.V. Sadananda Gowda
Preceded by Siddaramaiah	Chief Minister of Karnataka; 17 May 2018 – 19 May 2018	Succeeded by H. D. Kumaraswamy
Preceded by H. D. Kumaraswamy	Chief Minister of Karnataka; 26 July 2019 – 28 July 2021	Succeeded by Basavaraj Bommai
