= B. Y. Vijayendra =

Indian politician and president of bjp karnataka

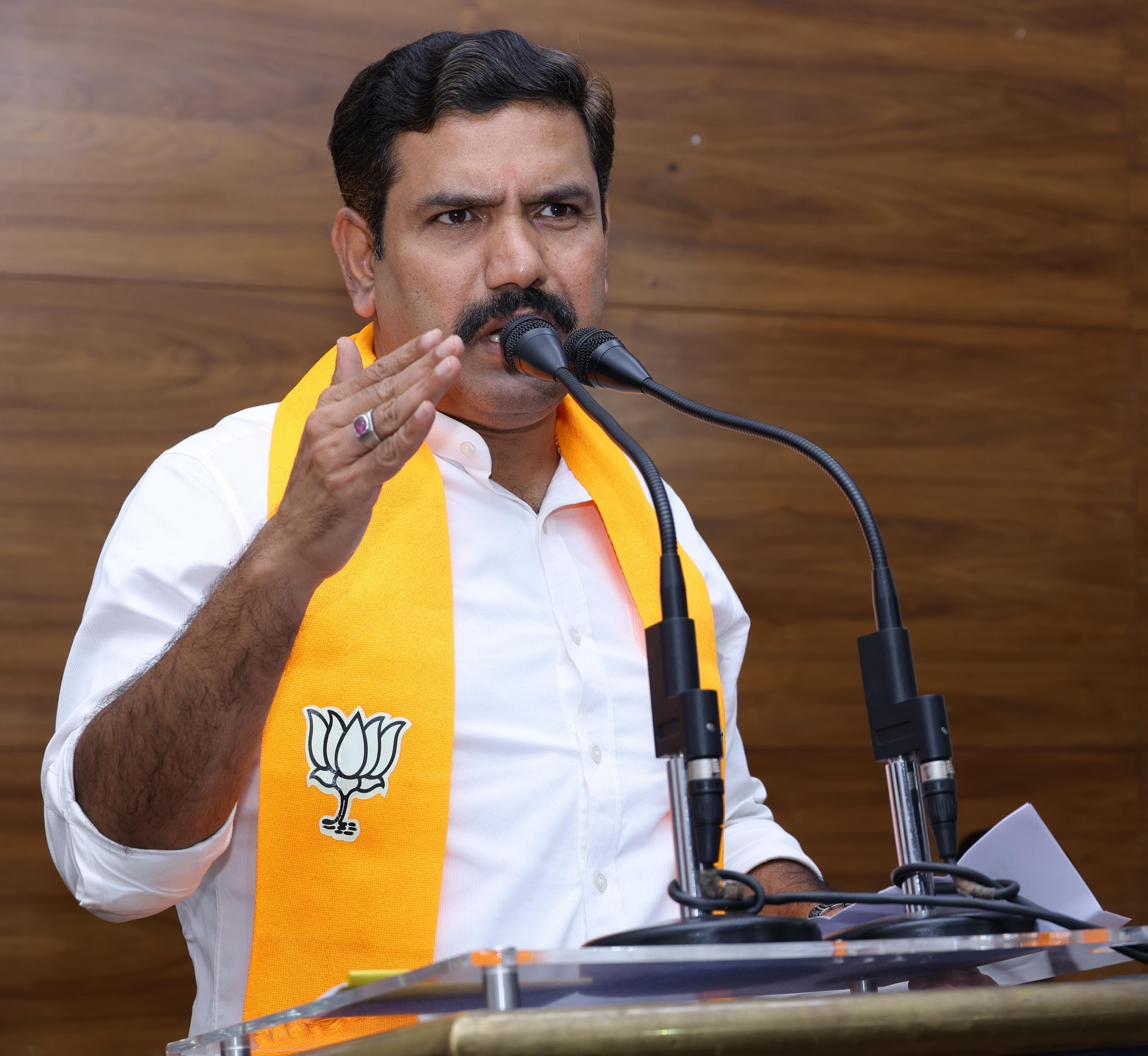

Member of Karnataka Legislative Assembly
- Incumbent
- Assumed office 13 May 2023
- Preceded by: B. S. Yediyurappa
- Constituency: Shikaripura

President of Bharatiya Janata Party, Karnataka
- Incumbent
- Assumed office 10 November 2023
- President: J. P. Nadda; Nitin Nabin
- Preceded by: Nalin Kumar Kateel

Personal details
- Born: 5 November 1975 (age 50) Shikaripur, Karnataka, India
- Party: Bharatiya Janata Party
- Spouse: Prema Vijayendra
- Children: B. V. Mythri; B. V. Jansi
- Parents: B. S. Yediyurappa (father); Mythradevi (mother)
- Relatives: B. Y. Raghavendra
- Education: Bachelor of Laws (L.L.B.)
- Alma mater: Bengaluru University

Bookanakere Yediyurappa Vijayendra is an Indian politician who is currently the state president of BJP Karnataka and MLA of Shikaripura. He previously served as the general secretary and vice president of BJYM Karnataka.

== Personal life ==
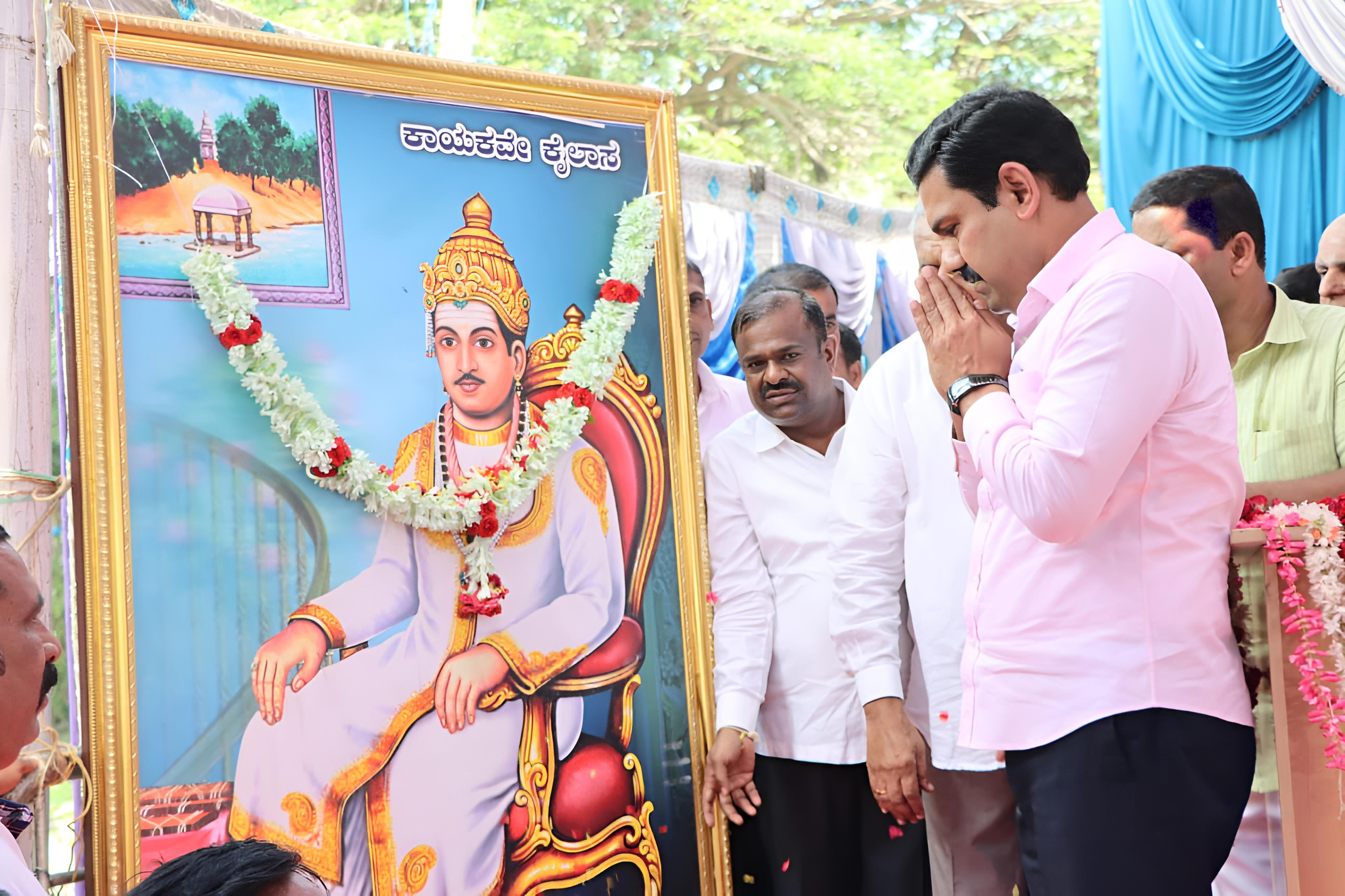
B. Y. Vijayendra

Vijayendra was born on 5 November 1975 at Shikaripur town in Karnataka, to the Kannada-speaking Lingayata family of B. S. Yediyurappa and Mythradevi. Vijayendra is a Bachelor of Laws (L.L.B.) graduate from Bengaluru University and had a brief stint as an advocate. Vijayendra is married to Prema and the couple have two daughters, B. V. Mythri and B. V. Jansi. Vijayendra's father B. S. Yediyurappa is former Chief Minister of Karnataka and his brother B. Y. Raghavendra is a member of Parliament from Shimoga Lok Sabha constituency. The Yediyurappa family belongs to the Banajiga community of Lingayat tradition.

== Political career ==
Vijayendra was appointed General Secretary of the BJP State Yuva Morcha in April 2018. He toured various districts in Karnataka to strengthen the youth wing of the party, recognizing the importance of youth in political organizations. His organizational skills and focus on community engagement were pivotal during the Assembly by-elections, contributing to the BJP's victories. In the 2023 Karnataka Legislative Assembly elections, Vijayendra led the BJP's campaign in the KR Pete constituency, a region traditionally dominated by Congress and JD(S). His strategic efforts resulted in a significant victory for K.C. Narayana Gowda, marking a key turning point for the BJP in a historically challenging district. Following the success in KR Pet, Vijayendra took charge of the Sira constituency's by-election in Tumkur district, where his leadership and organizational focus enabled Dr. Rajesh Gowda to achieve the largest victory margin in the constituency's history. Recognizing his accomplishments, Vijayendra was appointed State BJP Vice President in 2020, where he has continued to excel in his role. Presently B.Y. Vijayendra serves as the State President of the Bharatiya Janata Party (BJP) in Karnataka, having taken on this pivotal role in 2023.

As State President of the BJP, B.Y. Vijayendra led the "Mysuru Chalo" padayatra, successfully mobilizing public support against the Congress government's policies. This initiative effectively spotlighted issues of corruption and misgovernance, rallying significant attention and backing for the BJP's agenda in Karnataka.

In addition to his role in political mobilization, Vijayendra also led the BJP Sadasyata Abhiyan (membership drive), which successfully helped the party surpass the 50+ lakh membership mark in Karnataka, further strengthening the BJP's organizational foundation under his dynamic leadership.

His ability to foster enthusiasm among party workers has led to a renewed spirit within the BJP, creating an environment of ""Namo Vijaya."" As a young leader, he aims to further strengthen the BJP's presence and influence in Karnataka.

== Electoral statistics ==
In the 2023 Karnataka Legislative Assembly elections, B.Y. Vijayendra contested from Shikaripura, a stronghold of his father, B.S. Yediyurappa, who previously represented the constituency. Vijayendra won the election with a margin of 11,008 votes, successfully retaining the seat for the Bharatiya Janata Party (BJP).

Year	Election	Constituency Name	Party	Result	Votes gained	Vote share%	Margin	Ref
2023	Karnataka Assembly General Election	Shikaripura	BJP	Won	81,810	49.07%	11,008	

== Gallery ==
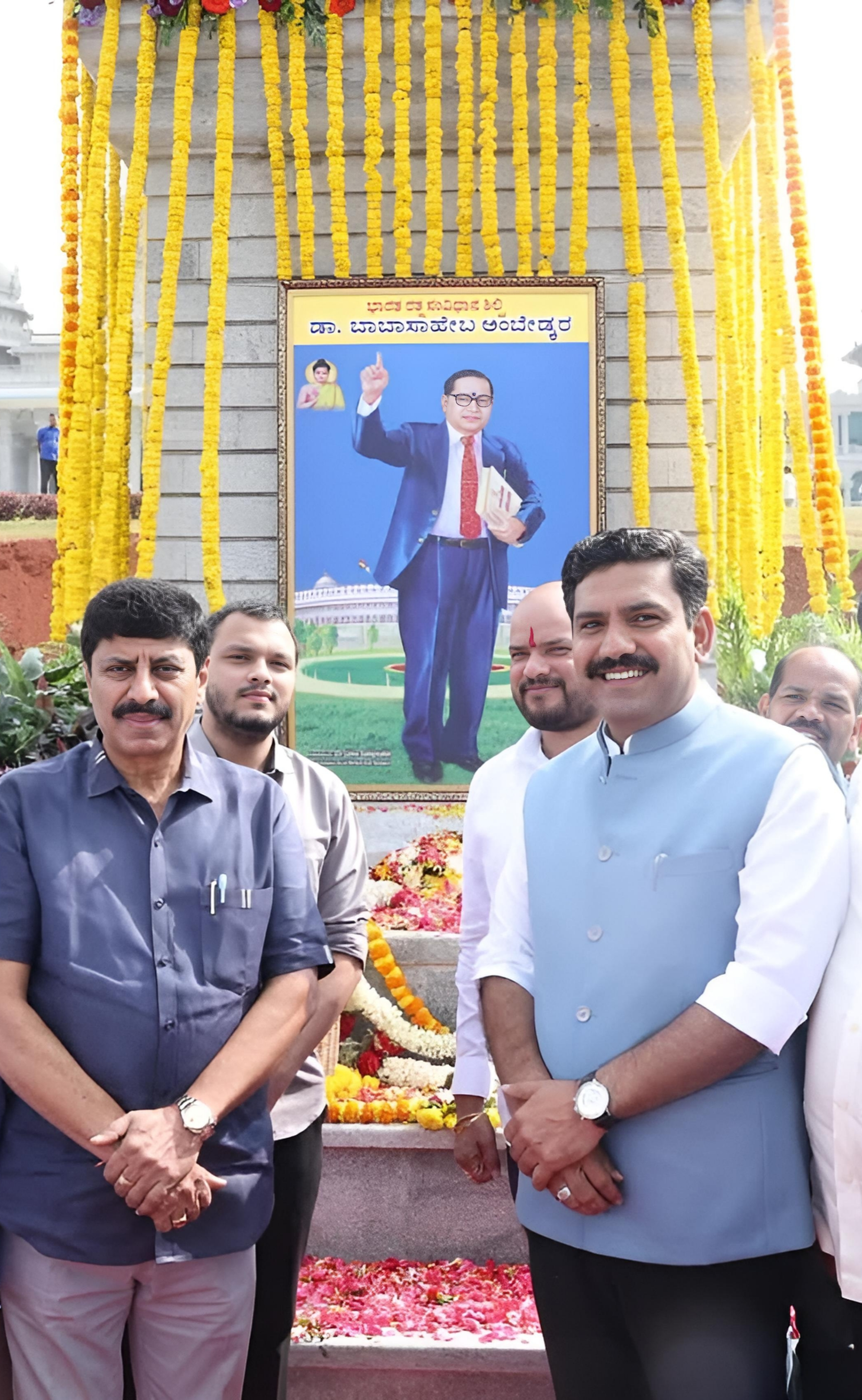
B. Y. Vijayendra

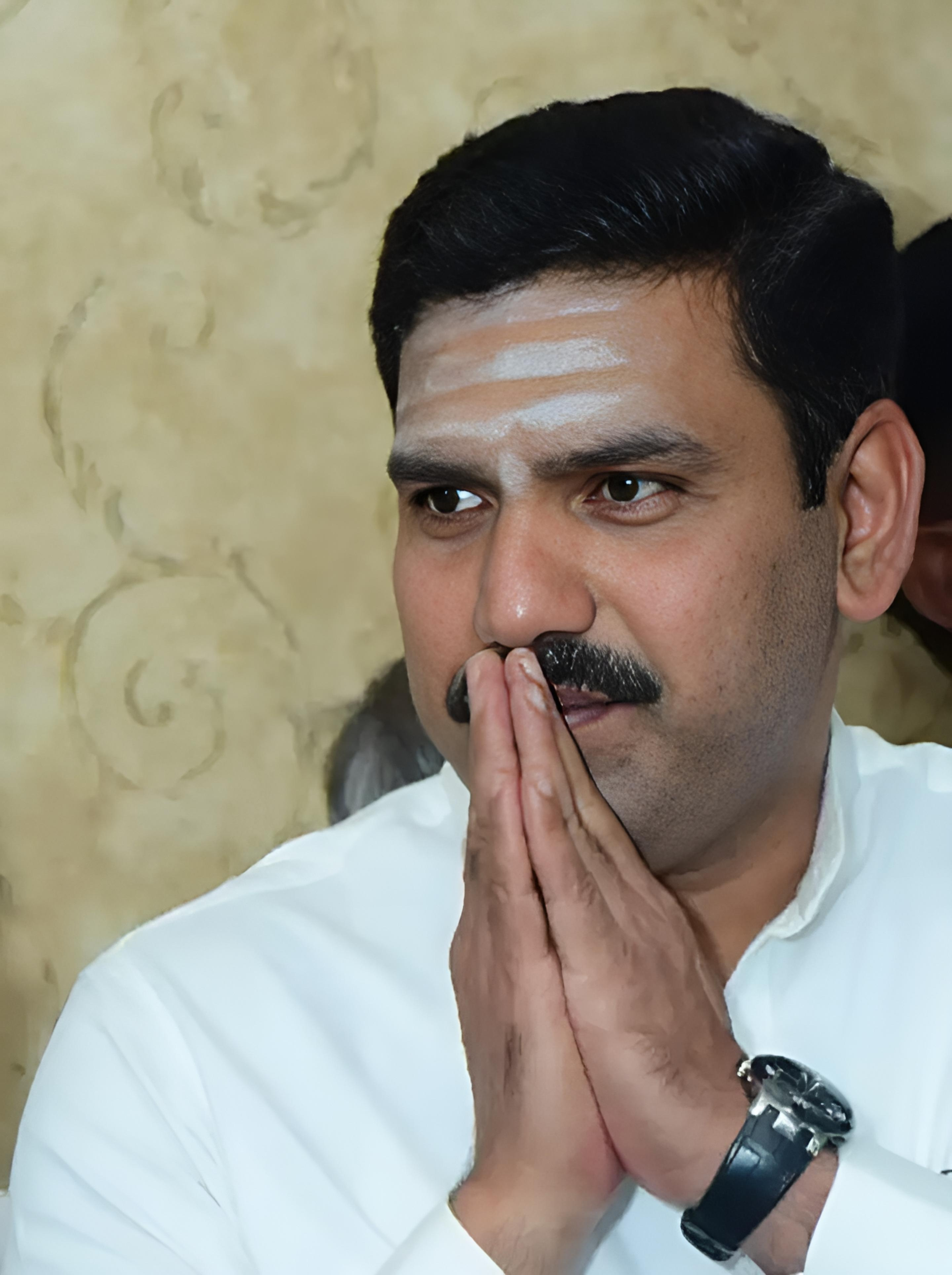
B. Y. Vijayendra

== See also ==
- B. S. Yediyurappa
