= Abbalagere =

- Village
- Location in Karnataka, India Abbalagere (India)
- Coordinates: 13.995020°N 75.582970°E
- Country: India
- State: Karnataka
- District: Shimoga
- Talukas: Shimoga

Government
  - Body: Village Panchayat

Languages
  - Official: Kannada
- Time zone: UTC+5:30 (IST)
- Nearest city: Shimoga
- Civic agency: Village Panchayat

Abbalagere is a village of the Shimoga taluk of Shimoga district in Karnataka, India.

== Economy ==
The economy of Abbalagere consists primarily of agriculture. Farmers in this area grow areca nut, plantation crops, paddy, and maize. Many villagers commute daily to the nearby city of Shimoga.

Abbalagere was once known for tobacco production. The Central Tobacco market yard has been operated in the village for many years. However, in 2006-2007, former Prime Minister and Member of Parliament of Hassan, H. D. Deve Gowda (a member of the Central Tobacco board) shifted the market to his district Hassan (Ramanathapuram). After the relocation, all farmers residing in Shimoga taluk, Chikmagalur, and Davangere left the tobacco industry.

== Location ==
Abbalagere is located along the Shimoga-Hanagal State Highway, which passes through Savalunga and Shikaripura. Shimoga is situated approximately seven kilometres from Abbalagere.

The Naval KSSCA Cricket Stadium is near Abbalagere village. The Essar petrol bunk at Abbalagere serves on a 24/7 basis.

== Education ==
Nearby educational institutions include the Jawaharlal Nehru National Engineering College, the Bapuji Ayurvedic College, National Public School, Girimaji N Rajgopal Institute of Management, and the University of Agricultural and Horticultural Sciences. The village also has one public primary school and one public high school.

== Religion ==
Temples include the Sri. Ujjayani Marula Siddeshwara temple, Ganesha temple, Choudamma temple, Muruda Basaveshwara temple and Bhavi Mallappa temple.

The Ujjain Eshwara temple regularly holds a Parav festival.

== Demographics ==
The village has a diverse population. It has Lingayath, Tamils, mixed-race Banjar people and other mixed-race people. Land prices are somewhat costly due to its proximity to Shimoga. The Abbalagere stretched recently through new colonies. Ratnagiri layout and Ratnakar Nagar layout started approximately 100 and 300 residential areas opposite to Tobacco market and Method Road cross, respectively. The Ratnagiri and Ratnakara layout easily connects Shimoga city jurisdiction with Abbalagere panchayath area.

== Politics ==
Abbalagere is under the Shimoga Rural Assembly and Shimoga Lok Sabha constituency. 1500-1800 voters registered in 2015. Abbalagere has its village (gram) Panchayath.

== Transport ==
A city bus began operation in 1994. A single city bus runs the Gopala-Jayanagar-Navile-Abbalagere-Hounsou route seven times per day. All private buses from Shimoga private bus stop towards Savalanga, Nyamathi, Shika Ripura, Soraba, Honnali, and Holalur routes stop at Abbalagere. In 2017, Shimoga Mahanagar Palika started KSRTC city bus services from Abbalagere to Sakrebailu and other routes.

== Population ==
| Census parameter | Census data |
|---|---|
| Total population | 1,479 |
| Total no. of houses | 373 |
| Female population % | 49.2% (727) |
| Total literacy rate % | 60.4% (894) |
| Female literacy rate | 26.2% (388) |
| Scheduled Tribes population % | 6.8% (101) |
| Scheduled Caste population % | 24.6% (364) |
| Working population % | 48.3% |
| Child (0-6) population in 2011 | 141 |
| Female child (0-6) population % in 2011 | 56.7% (80) |
