= K. S. Eshwarappa =

Indian politician (born 1948)

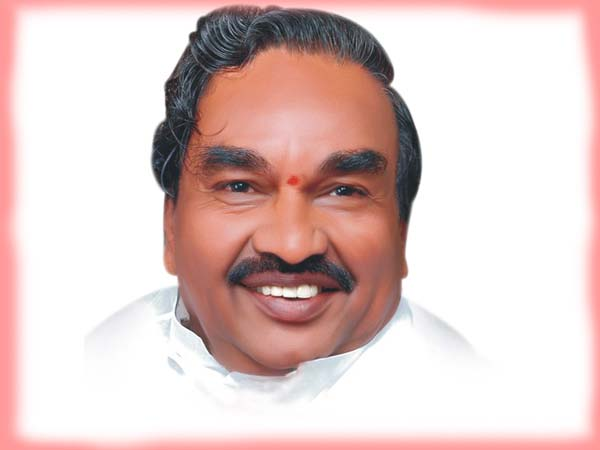

Minister of Rural Development & Panchayat Raj Government of Karnataka
- In office 20 August 2019 – 14 April 2022
- Chief Minister: B. S. Yediyurappa; Basavaraj Bommai
- Preceded by: Krishna Byre Gowda
- In office 12 July 2012 – 13 May 2013
- Chief Minister: Jagadish Shettar
- Preceded by: Jagadish Shettar
- Succeeded by: H. K. Patil

Minister of Youth Empowerment & Sports Government of Karnataka
- In office 27 September 2019 – 10 February 2020
- Chief Minister: B. S. Yediyurappa; Basavaraj Bommai
- Preceded by: Rahim Khan
- Succeeded by: C. T. Ravi

6th Deputy Chief Minister of Karnataka
- In office 12 July 2012 – 13 May 2013 Serving with R. Ashoka
- Chief Minister: Jagadish Shettar
- Preceded by: B. S. Yeddyurappa
- Succeeded by: G. Parameshwara

Minister of Revenue Government of Karnataka
- In office 12 July 2012 – 13 May 2013
- Chief Minister: Jagadish Shettar
- Preceded by: G. Karunakara Reddy
- Succeeded by: Srinivasa Prasad

Minister of Energy Government of Karnataka
- In office 30 May 2008 – 28 January 2010
- Chief Minister: B. S. Yediyurappa
- Preceded by: H. D. Revanna
- Succeeded by: Shobha Karandlaje

Minister of Major & Medium Irrigation Government of Karnataka
- In office 18 February 2006 – 8 October 2007
- Chief Minister: H. D. Kumaraswamy
- Preceded by: Mallikarjun Kharge
- Succeeded by: Basavaraj Bommai

Leader of the Opposition Karnataka Legislative Council
- In office 13 July 2014 – 29 May 2018
- Preceded by: D. V. Sadananda Gowda
- Succeeded by: Kota Srinivas Poojary

President of Bharatiya Janata Party, Karnataka
- In office 2 January 2010 – 11 July 2012
- Preceded by: D V Sadananda Gowda
- Succeeded by: Prahlad Joshi

Member of Karnataka Legislative Council
- In office 1 July 2014 – 15 May 2018
- Constituency: elected by the Legislative Assembly members

Member of Karnataka Legislative Assembly
- In office 17 May 2018 – 13 May 2023
- Preceded by: K. B. Prasanna Kumar
- Succeeded by: S. N. Channabasappa
- Constituency: Shimoga Urban
- In office 2004–2013
- Preceded by: H.M Chandrashekarappa
- Succeeded by: K. B. Prasanna Kumar
- Constituency: Shimoga Urban
- In office 1989–1999
- Preceded by: K. H. Srinivassa
- Succeeded by: H.M Chandrashekarappa
- Constituency: Shimoga Urban

Personal details
- Born: 10 June 1948 (age 78) Ballari, Mysore State, India
- Party: Bharatiya Janata Party

K. Sharanappa Eshwarappa (born 10 June 1948) is an Indian politician and a senior Bharatiya Janata Party member, who was the 6th Deputy Chief Minister of Karnataka, in the government headed by Jagadish Shettar. He has also served as the Minister for Energy, Minister for major irrigation and water resources and also the State President of BJP Karnataka unit. On 20 August 2019 he was inducted as a Cabinet Minister in the BJP government led by B.S. Yediyurappa. He was Minister of State for Rural development and Panchayat Raj of Karnataka from 20 August 2019 to 14 April 2022. He served as Leader of the Opposition in the Karnataka Legislative Council (2014-2018).

== Early life ==
K. S. Eshwarappa was born in Bellary. His father Sharanappa and mother Bassamma moved to Shimoga in the early 1950s. His parents worked in the Bhoopalam Areca Mandi as daily wage workers. When young Eshwarappa also tried to go to work with his parents, his mother opposed the move and urged him to concentrate on his education and earn a good name in society. This inspiration that he got in his childhood, eventually led him to become a social worker.

As a child, Eshwarappa was interested in sports and music.

While he was a student in the National Commerce College, Shimoga, he actively worked with the Akhil Bharatiya Vidyarthi Parishad (A.B.V.P.), the student wing of RSS. After his graduation, he started his own private business in Shimoga city. He also involved himself with the erstwhile Bharatiya Jana Sangh.

== Political career ==
During the Emergency (1975–77), he was arrested and detained in the Bellary Jail. After the removal of emergency, he became very active in politics. He worked in different capacities and in 1982, became the president of the Shimoga city unit of BJP. His personal efforts were one of the main reasons in M. Ananda Rao winning from Shimoga as the first ever BJP candidate.

In 1989, he contested the Karnataka assembly elections as a BJP candidate from Shimoga and defeated a heavyweight, the then health Minister K. H. Srinivas by a margin of 1,304 votes. He became popular with this victory and went on to win four more times from this constituency, losing only once in 1999. In 1992, he became the President of the State unit of BJP and was instrumental in his party's good performance in the 1994 state assembly elections. In 2000, he was appointed the Chairman of the Central Silk Board when the NDA government was in power.

In the BJP-JDS coalition Government headed by H. D. Kumaraswamy, he was Minister for Water Resources. Following the historic victory of the BJP in the Karnataka state elections in 2008, he became the minister for Power in the B.S. Yeddyurappa government.

In January 2010, he resigned as minister and was unanimously elected as the President of the Karnataka state unit of the ruling BJP. This move was seen as BJP's strategy to tackle opposition leader in the assembly Siddaramaiah, who also belongs to the same community.

In July 2012, following the resignation of D.V. Sadananda Gowda, Jagadish Shettar was appointed the Chief minister and Eshwarappa became Deputy Chief minister. He was also entrusted with the Revenue and Rural development portfolios. He then stepped down as the State BJP president and was succeeded by Prahlad Joshi.

In the 2013 Assembly elections, Eshwarappa contested again from the Shimoga assembly constituency and lost to K. B. Prasanna Kumar of the Congress by a margin of nearly 6,000 votes. Days after making an alleged "hate speech" against a minority community, Eshwarappa was slapped with a criminal case in April 2013 after electoral officials issued directions for it.

However, he was nominated by his party to the Karnataka Legislative Council in 2014 and became the Leader of the Opposition in the council.

In the 2018 Karnataka Legislative Assembly election he again contested from Shimaga and won the seat. Further after the collapse of H. D. Kumaraswamy's coalition government, he was sworn in as the Rural development and Panchayat Raj minister. After the resignation of B. S. Yediyurappa he was again inducted as the cabinet minister under Basavaraj Bommai.

On 14 April 2022, Eshwarappa resigned from his position as Rural Development and Panchayat Raj minister after a controversy arose over his alleged role in the suicide of a contractor, Santhosh Patil, who wasn't paid for road works.

In April 2023, Eshwarappa announced retirement from electoral politics, by writing to the National President of BJP J. P. Nadda to not consider his name to any constituency for the Karnataka Assembly elections that year. In a press meet, he cited the age rule of 75 years in the party, and thanked his party and the leaders for providing all opportunities in his career. In March 2024, he expressed displeasure over his son Kantesh being denied a ticket to contest the general election for the Lok Sabha from Haveri, and blamed party colleague Yeddyurappa alleging his hand in the matter. Consequently, Eshwarappa announced that he would contest as an independent candidate from Shimoga against B. Y. Raghavendra, the incumbent MP and son of Yeddyurappa, who was given a BJP ticket. This led to him being expelled by the party in April 2024 for a period of six years.

== Controversies ==
Santhosh Patil, a contractor involved in government projects, accused Eshwarappa of harassing him for commission, was found dead in a hotel in the state's Udupi district on morning of April 12, 2022.

Patil who had recently raised allegations against the then rural development minister K S Eshwarappa, saying that the BJP leader had been harassing him for commissions to clear the bills for contracts he had implemented for the government over a year ago. Patil had also said that Eshwarappa should be held responsible if something happened to him.

On April 12, Karnataka Chief Minister Basavaraj Bommai was informed in Mangaluru that the contractor had gone missing after leaving a note behind. Patil, who identified himself as the national secretary of a right-wing group called Hindu Vahini, had recently written to Prime Minister Narendra Modi and Union minister for rural development Giriraj Singh alleging that Eshwarappa and his associates were harassing him for commissions. Eshwarappa claimed that he did not know Patil.

Patil, in his letters to the central government, had stated that he and six other contractors had implemented road projects in Hindala gram panchayat in Belagavi district in May 2021, but were not paid for the same. He claimed that the contractors invested Rs 4 crore for the project, but had suffered losses due to government delay in payments.

Alleging that government officials were seeking a 40 per cent commission on the total bill, Patil claimed to have approached top BJP leaders with his grievances. "I am in great tension and have huge pressure from creditors who have given me finance on interest. If the payment and work order is not given immediately, then I do not have any option for myself," he had said in a March 11 letter to the Union minister.

On 22 April 2024, Eshwarappa is expelled from BJP for six years.

=== Hate Speech ===
Eshwarappa made a controversial remark at an event in Gundlupet, claiming that churches and mosques were built in Mathura and Kashi after demolishing temples.

He also said Narendra Modi will become the Prime Minister again in 2024, and those mosques will also be destroyed on the lines of the Babri Masjid in Ayodhya and temples will be rebuilt there too.

In March 2023, Eshwarappa triggered a row after he asked whether Allah was deaf if Muslims had to recite his name through the microphone every day. During his speech at the BJP's ongoing Vijay Sankalpa Yatra on 12 March 2023, azan – the Islamic call for prayer – was heard in the background. On hearing it, the Shivamogga MLA said the azaan was a headache for him wherever he went. "There is a Supreme Court judge. Today or tomorrow, this (practice of calling azaan over mics) will definitely end," Eshwarappa said, attracting cheers from party supporters at the rally.

In June 2023, he said that all mosques must be replaced by temples drawing ire from the ruling Congress government in Karnataka.

Political offices
Preceded by B. S. Yeddyurappa	Deputy Chief Minister of Karnataka; 13 July 2012 – 8 May 2013	Succeeded by Dr. G. Parameshwara
