= Shikaripura Assembly constituency =

Constituency of the Karnataka legislative assembly in India

Coordinates: 14.27°N 75.36°E

Shikaripura
- Constituency No. 115 for the Karnataka Legislative Assembly

Constituency details
- Country: India
- Region: South India
- State: Karnataka
- District: Shimoga
- Lok Sabha constituency: Shimoga
- Established: 1961
- Total electors: 198,883
- Reservation: None

Member of Legislative Assembly
- 16th Karnataka Legislative Assembly
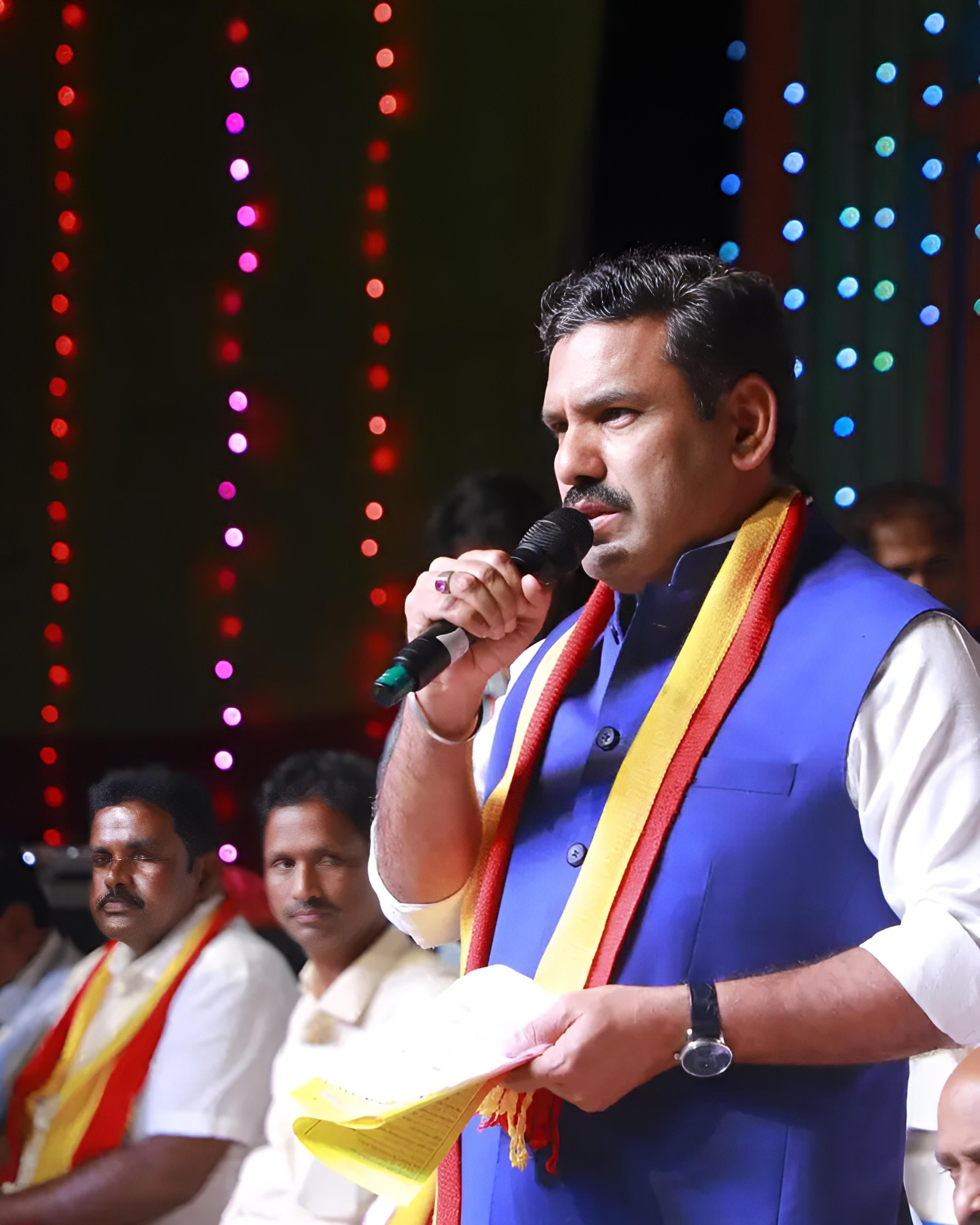
- Incumbent B. Y. Vijayendra
- Party: Bharatiya Janata Party
- Elected year: 2023

Shikaripura Assembly constituency is one of the 224 assembly constituencies of Karnataka, a state in Southern India. It is named after the town of Shikaripur, which forms part of the constituency. It is one of the eight Vidhan Sabha constituencies which form Shimoga Lok Sabha constituency.

== Members of the Legislative Assembly ==
Year	Member	Political party
1962	Veerappa	Indian National Congress
1967	G. Basavanappa	Sanghata Socialist Party
1972	K. Yenkatappa	Indian National Congress
1978	K. Yenkatappa	Indian National Congress
1983	B. S. Yediyurappa	Bharatiya Janata Party
1985	B. S. Yediyurappa	Bharatiya Janata Party
1989	B. S. Yediyurappa	Bharatiya Janata Party
1994	B. S. Yediyurappa	Bharatiya Janata Party
1999	B. N. Mahalingappa	Indian National Congress
2004	B. S. Yediyurappa	Bharatiya Janata Party
2008	B. S. Yediyurappa	Bharatiya Janata Party
2013	B. S. Yediyurappa	Karnataka Janata Paksha
2014 (Note: Resigned on 30/05/2014)	B. Y. Raghavendra	Bharatiya Janata Party
2018	B. S. Yediyurappa	Bharatiya Janata Party
2023	B. Y. Vijayendra	Bharatiya Janata Party

== Election results ==
=== Assembly Election 2023 ===
2023 Karnataka Legislative Assembly election : Shikaripura
Party	Candidate	Votes	%	±%
BJP	B. Y. Vijayendra	81,810	49.07%	▼7.09
Independent	S. P. Nagarajagowda	70,802	42.47%	New
INC	Goni Malatesh	8,101	4.86%	▼28.45
Independent	Imtiyaz A. Attar	2,944	1.77%	New
NOTA	None of the above	688	0.41%	▼0.17
Margin of victory		11,008	6.60%	▼16.25
Turnout		167,151	84.04%	▲1.70
Total valid votes		166,729		
Registered electors		198,883		▲5.64
BJP hold		Swing	▼7.09	

=== Assembly Election 2018 ===
2018 Karnataka Legislative Assembly election : Shikaripura
Party	Candidate	Votes	%	±%
BJP	B. S. Yediyurappa	86,983	56.16%	▲4.42
INC	Goni Malatesh	51,586	33.31%	▼13.78
JD(S)	H. T. Balegar	13,191	8.52%	New
NOTA	None of the above	903	0.58%	▲0.18
Margin of victory		35,397	22.85%	▲18.20
Turnout		155,009	82.34%	▲4.10
Total valid votes		154,883		
Registered electors		188,266		▲6.09
BJP hold		Swing	▲4.42	

=== Assembly By-election 2014 ===
2014 Karnataka Legislative Assembly by-election : Shikaripura
Party	Candidate	Votes	%	±%
BJP	B. Y. Raghavendra	71,547	51.74%	▲50.05
INC	H. S. Shanthavirappa Gowda	65,117	47.09%	▲15.42
NOTA	None of the above	560	0.40%	New
Margin of victory		6,430	4.65%	▼12.65
Turnout		138,849	78.24%	▼2.00
Total valid votes		138,289		
Registered electors		177,465		▲2.73
BJP gain from KJP		Swing	▲2.77	

=== Assembly Election 2013 ===
2013 Karnataka Legislative Assembly election : Shikaripura
Party	Candidate	Votes	%	±%
KJP	B. S. Yediyurappa	69,126	48.97%	New
INC	H. S. Shanthaveerappagow Dashantanna	44,701	31.67%	New
JD(S)	Balegar. H	15,007	10.63%	New
BJP	S. H. Manjunatha	2,383	1.69%	▼64.53
Independent	Rajunaika	1,447	1.03%	New
Independent	Eshwarappa. D. S	1,288	0.91%	New
Independent	Koteshwara	1,157	0.82%	New
Independent	Eryanaika	1,132	0.80%	New
Independent	Saifulla. G	936	0.66%	New
Margin of victory		24,425	17.30%	▼19.13
Turnout		138,616	80.24%	▲1.79
Total valid votes		141,159		
Registered electors		172,749		▲7.40
KJP gain from BJP		Swing	▼17.25	

=== Assembly Election 2008 ===
2008 Karnataka Legislative Assembly election : Shikaripura
Party	Candidate	Votes	%	±%
BJP	B. S. Yediyurappa	83,491	66.22%	▲10.72
SP	S. Bangarappa	37,564	29.79%	New
Independent	Dr. Riyaz Basha	1,384	1.10%	New
BSP	J. Jayappa	1,226	0.97%	New
Independent	Bangarappa. D	1,139	0.90%	New
Margin of victory		45,927	36.43%	▲19.39
Turnout		126,194	78.45%	▲3.69
Total valid votes		126,077		
Registered electors		160,853		▲2.67
BJP hold		Swing	▲10.72	

=== Assembly Election 2004 ===
2004 Karnataka Legislative Assembly election : Shikaripura
Party	Candidate	Votes	%	±%
BJP	B. S. Yediyurappa	64,972	55.50%	▲10.12
INC	K. Shekarappa	45,019	38.46%	▼14.02
JD(S)	Bhukantha. B. D	3,813	3.26%	▲1.38
JP	Naganagowda Patil	1,089	0.93%	New
Independent	Sakalesha Kumar. G	735	0.63%	New
Margin of victory		19,953	17.04%	▲9.94
Turnout		117,128	74.76%	▼3.61
Total valid votes		117,068		
Registered electors		156,672		▲13.25
BJP gain from INC		Swing	▲3.02	

=== Assembly Election 1999 ===
1999 Karnataka Legislative Assembly election : Shikaripura
Party	Candidate	Votes	%	±%
INC	B. N. Mahalingappa	55,852	52.48%	▲30.61
BJP	B. S. Yediyurappa	48,291	45.38%	▼4.75
JD(S)	Nagarada Mahadevappa	1,997	1.88%	New
Margin of victory		7,561	7.10%	▼21.16
Turnout		108,422	78.37%	▲0.61
Total valid votes		106,425		
Rejected ballots		1,992	1.84%	▲0.04
Registered electors		138,346		▲4.07
INC gain from BJP		Swing	▲2.35	

=== Assembly Election 1994 ===
1994 Karnataka Legislative Assembly election : Shikaripura
Party	Candidate	Votes	%	±%
BJP	B. S. Yediyurappa	50,885	50.13%	▲8.71
INC	Nagarada Mahadevappa	22,200	21.87%	▲12.89
INC	B. K. Vishwanath	14,344	14.13%	New
Independent	N. Purvanaika	11,739	11.56%	New
JD	M. Manjappa Bannur	1,055	1.04%	▼1.49
Margin of victory		28,685	28.26%	▲25.69
Turnout		103,367	77.76%	▲0.34
Total valid votes		101,509		
Rejected ballots		1,858	1.80%	▼3.35
Registered electors		132,930		▲10.51
BJP hold		Swing	▲8.71	

=== Assembly Election 1989 ===
1989 Karnataka Legislative Assembly election : Shikaripura
Party	Candidate	Votes	%	±%
BJP	B. S. Yediyurappa	36,589	41.42%	▼12.10
Independent	Nagarada Mahadevappa	34,315	38.85%	New
INC	K. Shekarappa	7,935	8.98%	▼28.72
JP	G. Basavanappa	4,456	5.04%	New
Kranti Sabha	N. Arun	2,621	2.97%	New
JD	T. H. Mahadevappa	2,234	2.53%	New
Margin of victory		2,274	2.57%	▼13.26
Turnout		93,126	77.42%	▲0.93
Total valid votes		88,329		
Rejected ballots		4,797	5.15%	▲3.36
Registered electors		120,283		▲23.75
BJP hold		Swing	▼12.10	

=== Assembly Election 1985 ===
1985 Karnataka Legislative Assembly election : Shikaripura
Party	Candidate	Votes	%	±%
BJP	B. S. Yediyurappa	39,077	53.52%	▼10.68
INC	Mahadevana Gowdaru. M. Patil	27,522	37.70%	▲8.50
JP	H. Tasveer Ahmad	4,967	6.80%	▲3.71
Independent	H. K. Laxmana Gowda	793	1.09%	New
Margin of victory		11,555	15.83%	▼19.17
Turnout		74,345	76.49%	▲2.75
Total valid votes		73,011		
Rejected ballots		1,334	1.79%	▼0.31
Registered electors		97,200		▲10.71
BJP hold		Swing	▼10.68	

=== Assembly Election 1983 ===
1983 Karnataka Legislative Assembly election : Shikaripura
Party	Candidate	Votes	%	±%
BJP	B. S. Yediyurappa	40,687	64.20%	New
INC	K. Yenkatappa	18,504	29.20%	▲13.64
JP	H. S. Mehaboob	1,956	3.09%	▼28.94
Independent	C. Basha	1,593	2.51%	New
Independent	Mahadevappa	517	0.82%	New
Margin of victory		22,183	35.00%	▲14.61
Turnout		64,738	73.74%	▲0.23
Total valid votes		63,378		
Rejected ballots		1,360	2.10%	▼1.03
Registered electors		87,794		▲13.93
BJP gain from INC(I)		Swing	▲11.78	

=== Assembly Election 1978 ===
1978 Karnataka Legislative Assembly election : Shikaripura
Party	Candidate	Votes	%	±%
INC(I)	K. Yenkatappa	28,760	52.42%	New
JP	H. Basavannappa	17,574	32.03%	New
INC	Mahadevanagowdaru	8,535	15.56%	▼53.74
Margin of victory		11,186	20.39%	▼27.47
Turnout		56,642	73.51%	▲14.24
Total valid votes		54,869		
Rejected ballots		1,773	3.13%	▲3.13
Registered electors		77,058		▲17.45
INC(I) gain from INC		Swing	▼16.88	

=== Assembly Election 1972 ===
1972 Mysore State Legislative Assembly election : Shikaripura
Party	Candidate	Votes	%	±%
INC	K. Yenkatappa	26,156	69.30%	▲39.02
INC(O)	E. P. Chandya Naik	8,092	21.44%	New
ABJS	S. Sundara Naik	2,004	5.31%	New
SSP	B. C. Venkatesh	1,492	3.95%	New
Margin of victory		18,064	47.86%	▲8.43
Turnout		38,889	59.27%	▼1.87
Total valid votes		37,744		
Registered electors		65,608		▲24.42
INC gain from SSP		Swing	▼0.42	

=== Assembly Election 1967 ===
1967 Mysore State Legislative Assembly election : Shikaripura
Party	Candidate	Votes	%	±%
SSP	G. Basavanappa	21,241	69.72%	New
INC	Veerappa	9,227	30.28%	▼24.62
Margin of victory		12,014	39.43%	▲23.80
Turnout		32,240	61.14%	▲9.66
Total valid votes		30,468		
Registered electors		52,730		▼20.73
SSP gain from INC		Swing	▲14.82	

=== Assembly Election 1962 ===
1962 Mysore State Legislative Assembly election : Shikaripura
Party	Candidate	Votes	%	±%
INC	Veerappa	17,313	54.90%	New
PSP	G. Basavanappa	12,385	39.28%	New
Independent	Mangala Naik	1,077	3.42%	New
ABJS	D. C. Godwalkar	758	2.40%	New
Margin of victory		4,928	15.63%	
Turnout		34,241	51.48%	
Total valid votes		31,533		
Registered electors		66,518		
INC win (new seat)				
