= 2019 Karnataka floods =

Natural disaster in Karnataka, India

- Date: 1 August 2019 – 29 August 2019
- Location: Karnataka, India
- Cause: Heavy rain Discharges; Landslide; Reservoir Discharges
- Deaths: 61 dead, 15 went missing
- Property damage: ₹35,160 crore (USD $4.95 billion)
- Website: www.ksndmc.org

On 1 August 2019, first week, due to heavy rainfall in the Monsoon season, severe flood affected the southern Indian State of Karnataka. As a security measure in the prevailing situation of heavy rains, India Meteorological Department issued Red alert to several regions of coastal and malnad regions of Karnataka state.

Thousands of people were evacuated to safer places and relief camps. A total of 61 people have been killed and seven lakh have been displaced. As of 14 August 2019, Over 6.97 lakh people were evacuated. Chief Minister BS Yediyurappa had announced a compensation of ₹5 lakh for the family members of those who died in the floods.

== Causes ==
Due to the heavy water discharge from the reservoir, the North Karnataka districts of Belagavi, Bijapur, Raichur, Kalburgi, Yadgir and Uttara Kannada were severely affected by the flood discharge. On 8 August, Karnataka received nearly five times the rainfall it normally used to have, adding to the severity of the ongoing floods in 12 districts that had killed 20 people by 9 August 2019.

Excess rainfall is the main possible factor that caused or intensified floods. According to government officials report any particular region can manage rainfall only up to a point, based on its land use and soil holding. Once that is reached, it floods.

== Effects ==
As of 14 August 2019, 61 people had been killed and 15 people were missing due to flood-related incidents across 22 districts of the state as per the data released by Karnataka State Natural Disaster Monitoring Centre (KSNDMC).

More than 40,000 houses were damaged in Karnataka floods and more than 2,000 villages were affected. North, coastal and Malanad districts were worst affected. Other affected districts include Bagalkot, Vijayapura, Raichur, Yadgiri, Uttara Kannada, Dakshina Kannada, Shivamogga, Kodagu and Chikkamagaluru.

Landslides occurred in many places in Chikkamagaluru, Kodagu, Dakshina Kannada and Uttara Kannada districts due to heavy rains. Connectivity on 137 major roads (National Highway, State Highway and Major district roads) has been disrupted due to floods and landslides.

There was extensive damage to critical infrastructure such as roads, pipelines, tanks, schools, and electrical infrastructure.

== Damage assessment ==
Damages due to Karnataka flood, data released by Karnataka Chief Minister's Office

- Human lives lost: 61
- People Missing: 15
- Animal death: 859
- People evacuated: 697948
- Animals rescued:51460
- Relief camps opened: 1160
- People in relief camps: 396617
- Houses damaged: 56381
- Districts and Taluks affected: 103 taluks of 22 districts affected and
- Agriculture and Horticulture crop loss (preliminary assessment): 6.9 lakh hectares.

== Rescues ==
Karnataka State Disaster Management Authority, Karnataka police along with the Indian Air Force, civilians, volunteers, fishermen from coastal Karnataka were actively taking part in the rescue operations in flood-affected regions. A joint rescue team consisting of Fire and Emergency, State Disaster Response Fund, National Disaster Response Force and Indian Army evacuated 6.73 lakh people as of 14 August 2019. Nobel officers are tasked to camp in vulnerable villages.

== Response ==
According to the Ministry of Home Affairs, Disaster Management Division, from 1 to 14 August, Karnataka received 658 mm of rainfall and because of this many people lost their lives.

== Relief and monetary aid ==
On 4 October 2019, Central Government had released an amount of 1200 Crores as Karnataka flood relief funds on the request of CM Yediyurappa.

== See also ==
- 2019 Kerala floods
