= S. N. Channabasappa =

Indian politician

Member of Karnataka Legislative Assembly
- Incumbent
- Assumed office 13 May 2023
- Preceded by: K. S. Eshwarappa
- Constituency: Shimoga

Personal details
- Born: Shivamogga
- Party: Bharatiya Janata Party

S. N. Channabasappa is an Indian politician from Karnataka. He is an MLA from Shimoga Assembly constituency in Shimoga district. He won the 2023 Karnataka Legislative Assembly election representing the Bharatiya Janata Party.

== Career ==
S. N. Channabasappa won from Shimoga Assembly constituency representing the Bharatiya Janata Party in the 2023 Karnataka Legislative Assembly election. He polled 96,490 votes and defeated his nearest rival, H. C. Yogesh of the Indian National Congress, by a margin of 27,674 votes.

Channabasappa who was elected four times to Shivamogga City Municipal Council and later Shivamogga City Corporation and worked as Deputy Mayor and also a leader of the ruling party in Shivamogga City Corporation. Earlier he was involved in the activities of pro-Hindutva organisations, RSS and Vishwa Hindu Parishad.
