= Shimoga Assembly constituency =

Constituency of the Karnataka Legislative Assembly

Coordinates: 13.94°N 75.56°E

Shimoga
- Constituency No. 113 for the Karnataka Legislative Assembly

Constituency details
- Country: India
- Region: South India
- State: Karnataka
- District: Shimoga
- Lok Sabha constituency: Shimoga
- Established: 1951
- Total electors: 260757
- Reservation: None

Member of Legislative Assembly
- 16th Karnataka Legislative Assembly
- Incumbent S. N. Channabasappa
- Party: Bharatiya Janata Party
- Elected year: 2023
- Preceded by: K. S. Eshwarappa

Shimoga Assembly constituency is one of the seats in Karnataka State Assembly in India. It is part of Shimoga Lok Sabha constituency.

== Members of the Legislative Assembly ==
Election	Member	Party
1952	S. R. Nagappa Setty	Indian National Congress
1957	Ratnamma Madhava Rao	Indian National Congress
1962	Ratnamma Madhava Rao	Indian National Congress
1967	A. R. Badri Narayan	Indian National Congress
1972	A. B. B. Narayanaiyengar	Indian National Congress
1978	K. H. Srinivasa	Indian National Congress
1983	M. Ananda Rao	Bharatiya Janata Party
1985	K. H. Srinivasa	Indian National Congress
1989	K. S. Eshwarappa	Bharatiya Janata Party
1994	K. S. Eshwarappa	Bharatiya Janata Party
1999	H. M. Chandrashekarappa	Indian National Congress
2004	K. S. Eshwarappa	Bharatiya Janata Party
2008	K. S. Eshwarappa	Bharatiya Janata Party
2013	K. B. Prasanna Kumar	Indian National Congress
2018	K. S. Eshwarappa	Bharatiya Janata Party
2023	S. N. Channabasappa	Bharatiya Janata Party

== Election results ==
=== Assembly Election 2023 ===
2023 Karnataka Legislative Assembly election : Shimoga
Party	Candidate	Votes	%	±%
BJP	S. N. Channabasappa	96,490	53.66%	▼6.70
INC	H. C. Yogesh	68,816	38.27%	▲4.66
JD(S)	Ayanur Manjunath	8,863	4.93%	▲1.57
UPP	Venkatesh. R	2,370	1.32%	New
NOTA	None of the above	1,225	0.68%	▲0.17
Margin of victory		27,674	15.39%	▼11.36
Turnout		180,734	69.31%	▲1.80
Total valid votes		179,829		
Registered electors		260,757		▲1.71
BJP hold		Swing	▼6.70	

=== Assembly Election 2018 ===
2018 Karnataka Legislative Assembly election : Shimoga
Party	Candidate	Votes	%	±%
BJP	K. S. Eshwarappa	104,027	60.36%	▲36.32
INC	K. B. Prasanna Kumar	57,920	33.61%	▲5.34
JD(S)	H. N. Niranjan	5,796	3.36%	▼12.18
NOTA	None of the above	875	0.51%	New
Margin of victory		46,107	26.75%	▲26.55
Turnout		173,081	67.51%	▲2.74
Total valid votes		172,354		
Registered electors		256,373		▲18.72
BJP gain from INC		Swing	▲32.09	

=== Assembly Election 2013 ===
2013 Karnataka Legislative Assembly election : Shimoga
Party	Candidate	Votes	%	±%
INC	K. B. Prasanna Kumar	39,355	28.27%	▲4.14
KJP	S. Rudregowda	39,077	28.07%	New
BJP	K. S. Eshwarappa	33,462	24.04%	▼29.54
JD(S)	M. Srikanth	21,638	15.54%	▼1.93
SDPI	K. B. Basheer Ahmed	3,312	2.38%	New
Margin of victory		278	0.20%	▼29.25
Turnout		139,872	64.77%	▲7.75
Total valid votes		139,215		
Registered electors		215,947		▲11.40
INC gain from BJP		Swing	▼25.31	

=== Assembly Election 2008 ===
2008 Karnataka Legislative Assembly election : Shimoga
Party	Candidate	Votes	%	±%
BJP	K. S. Eshwarappa	58,982	53.58%	▼0.77
INC	Ismail Khan	26,563	24.13%	▼15.06
JD(S)	M. Shreekanth	19,232	17.47%	▲15.28
SP	Y. H. Nagaraj	1,511	1.37%	New
Independent	D. Honnappa Aliyas Nimbehannu Manjunath	1,122	1.02%	New
BSP	M. Esuru Lokesh	806	0.73%	New
Margin of victory		32,419	29.45%	▲14.29
Turnout		110,523	57.02%	▼6.31
Total valid votes		110,086		
Registered electors		193,844		▼3.47
BJP hold		Swing	▼0.77	

=== Assembly Election 2004 ===
2004 Karnataka Legislative Assembly election : Shimoga
Party	Candidate	Votes	%	±%
BJP	K. S. Eshwarappa	69,015	54.35%	▲9.90
INC	Chandrashekarappa. H. N	49,766	39.19%	▼10.78
JP	Anantharamaiah. K. S	2,968	2.34%	New
JD(S)	Y. H. Nagaraj	2,777	2.19%	▼0.60
Kannada Nadu Party	Firoz	1,458	1.15%	New
Margin of victory		19,249	15.16%	▲9.64
Turnout		127,182	63.33%	▼3.91
Total valid votes		126,985		
Registered electors		200,814		▲9.83
BJP gain from INC		Swing	▲4.38	

=== Assembly Election 1999 ===
1999 Karnataka Legislative Assembly election : Shimoga
Party	Candidate	Votes	%	±%
INC	H. M. Chandrashekarappa	59,490	49.97%	▲12.50
BJP	Eshwarappa	52,916	44.45%	▼7.71
JD(S)	D. V. Ramesh	3,323	2.79%	New
SP	Fayaz	1,561	1.31%	New
AIADMK	M. M. Kuppuswamy	866	0.73%	New
Margin of victory		6,574	5.52%	▼9.17
Turnout		122,946	67.24%	▲0.14
Total valid votes		119,042		
Rejected ballots		3,829	3.11%	▲1.51
Registered electors		182,840		▲9.71
INC gain from BJP		Swing	▼2.19	

=== Assembly Election 1994 ===
1994 Karnataka Legislative Assembly election : Shimoga
Party	Candidate	Votes	%	±%
BJP	K. S. Eshwarappa	57,385	52.16%	▲17.35
INC	K. H. Srinivasa	41,219	37.47%	▲4.07
JD	G. Madappa	5,267	4.79%	▼12.93
INC	B. Mallikaruna Rao	4,196	3.81%	New
KRRS	K. S. Puttappa	1,317	1.20%	New
Margin of victory		16,166	14.69%	▲13.29
Turnout		111,825	67.10%	▲7.45
Total valid votes		110,020		
Rejected ballots		1,784	1.60%	▼6.39
Registered electors		166,659		▼1.39
BJP hold		Swing	▲17.35	

=== Assembly Election 1989 ===
1989 Karnataka Legislative Assembly election : Shimoga
Party	Candidate	Votes	%	±%
BJP	K. S. Eshwarappa	32,289	34.81%	▲16.73
INC	K. H. Srinivasa	30,987	33.40%	▼6.56
JD	Asmathpasha Anwar	16,439	17.72%	New
JP	Nagendra Rao. M	4,215	4.54%	New
AIML	Fasaluddin. A. M	3,284	3.54%	New
Kranti Sabha	Chandrasekhara. H. N	2,782	3.00%	New
Independent	Ramappa. S. B	706	0.76%	New
Independent	Umashankara Upadya. M	574	0.62%	New
Margin of victory		1,302	1.40%	▼11.07
Turnout		100,815	59.65%	▼3.75
Total valid votes		92,762		
Rejected ballots		8,053	7.99%	▲6.26
Registered electors		169,006		▲33.68
BJP gain from INC		Swing	▼5.15	

=== Assembly Election 1985 ===
1985 Karnataka Legislative Assembly election : Shimoga
Party	Candidate	Votes	%	±%
INC	K. H. Srinivasa	31,472	39.96%	▲15.52
JP	G. Madappa	21,650	27.49%	▼3.12
BJP	M. Ananda Rao	14,241	18.08%	▼17.03
Independent	S. S. Alum	7,856	9.97%	New
LKD	S. R. Nagappa Setty	2,480	3.15%	New
Independent	Bhagat Kumar	486	0.62%	New
Margin of victory		9,822	12.47%	▲7.97
Turnout		80,151	63.40%	▼5.93
Total valid votes		78,761		
Rejected ballots		1,390	1.73%	▼0.77
Registered electors		126,423		▲17.77
INC gain from BJP		Swing	▲4.85	

=== Assembly Election 1983 ===
1983 Karnataka Legislative Assembly election : Shimoga
Party	Candidate	Votes	%	±%
BJP	M. Ananda Rao	25,475	35.11%	New
JP	M. C. Maheswarappa	22,211	30.61%	▼3.34
INC	H. Gulma Abid	17,732	24.44%	▲23.00
Independent	V. A. Shariff	6,369	8.78%	New
Margin of victory		3,264	4.50%	▼14.04
Turnout		74,427	69.33%	▼4.57
Total valid votes		72,566		
Rejected ballots		1,861	2.50%	▼0.12
Registered electors		107,345		▲22.70
BJP gain from INC(I)		Swing	▼17.38	

=== Assembly Election 1978 ===
1978 Karnataka Legislative Assembly election : Shimoga
Party	Candidate	Votes	%	±%
INC(I)	K. H. Srinivasa	33,047	52.49%	New
JP	D. H. Shankara Murthy	21,373	33.95%	New
Independent	S. S. Bharmappa	7,632	12.12%	New
INC	Abdul Sattar Khan Afridi	908	1.44%	▼57.38
Margin of victory		11,674	18.54%	▼16.23
Turnout		64,657	73.90%	▲12.18
Total valid votes		62,960		
Rejected ballots		1,697	2.62%	▲2.62
Registered electors		87,488		▼1.59
INC(I) gain from INC		Swing	▼6.33	

=== Assembly Election 1972 ===
1972 Mysore State Legislative Assembly election : Shimoga
Party	Candidate	Votes	%	±%
INC	A. B. B. Narayanaiyengar	30,889	58.82%	▲11.28
SSP	Y. R. Parameshwarappa	12,630	24.05%	New
ABJS	D. H. Shankara Murthy	6,930	13.20%	▼6.52
Independent	S. P. Mariyappa	2,062	3.93%	New
Margin of victory		18,259	34.77%	▲16.72
Turnout		54,871	61.72%	▲2.29
Total valid votes		52,511		
Registered electors		88,906		▲23.19
INC hold		Swing	▲11.28	

=== Assembly Election 1967 ===
1967 Mysore State Legislative Assembly election : Shimoga
Party	Candidate	Votes	%	±%
INC	A. R. Badri Narayan	18,695	47.54%	▲3.10
SSP	Y. R. Parameshwarappa	11,598	29.50%	New
ABJS	B. R. K. Murthy	7,753	19.72%	New
Independent	K. T. Danamma	1,275	3.24%	New
Margin of victory		7,097	18.05%	▲2.04
Turnout		42,889	59.43%	▲5.33
Total valid votes		39,321		
Registered electors		72,172		▲14.68
INC hold		Swing	▲3.10	

=== Assembly Election 1962 ===
1962 Mysore State Legislative Assembly election : Shimoga
Party	Candidate	Votes	%	±%
INC	Ratnamma Madhava Rao	14,087	44.44%	▼9.17
PSP	G. M. Channappa	9,011	28.43%	New
ABJS	C. L. Ramanna	8,602	27.14%	New
Margin of victory		5,076	16.01%	▼13.88
Turnout		34,047	54.10%	▲5.50
Total valid votes		31,700		
Registered electors		62,931		▲23.99
INC hold		Swing	▼9.17	

=== Assembly Election 1957 ===
1957 Mysore State Legislative Assembly election : Shimoga
Party	Candidate	Votes	%	±%
INC	Ratnamma Madhava Rao	13,223	53.61%	▲7.23
ABJS	C. L. Ramanna	5,849	23.71%	▲5.48
Independent	Y. R. Parameshwarappa	5,595	22.68%	New
Margin of victory		7,374	29.89%	▲2.87
Turnout		24,667	48.60%	▼4.95
Total valid votes		24,667		
Registered electors		50,755		▲25.19
INC hold		Swing	▲7.23	

=== Assembly Election 1952 ===
1952 Mysore State Legislative Assembly election : Shimoga
Party	Candidate	Votes	%	±%
INC	S. R. Nagappa Setty	10,069	46.38%	New
Socialist Party (India)	M. C. Maheswarappa	4,203	19.36%	New
ABJS	K. N. Dathatri	3,957	18.23%	New
KMPP	N. N. Anche	3,482	16.04%	New
Margin of victory		5,866	27.02%	
Turnout		21,711	53.55%	
Total valid votes		21,711		
Registered electors		40,541		
INC win (new seat)				

== See also ==
- List of constituencies of Karnataka Legislative Assembly
