= K. B. Prasanna Kumar =

Indian politician

MLA
- In office 17 May 2013 – May 2018
- Preceded by: K. S. Eshwarappa
- Constituency: Shimoga

Personal details
- Born: Shivamogga
- Party: EX Indian National Congress Janata Dal (Secular)
- Spouse: Geethanjali
- Children: Avinash

K. B. Prasanna Kumar is a politician from Karnataka. He defeated K. S. Eshwarappa, Ex-Deputy Chief Minister in the Shimoga constituency in the 2013 Karnataka Legislative Assembly election. He was associated with Indian National Congress till 21 April 2023 for 20+ years. He joined JDS ( JANATA DAL SECULAR) Party on 21 April 2023 in the presence of EX PM H. D. Deve Gowda and EX CM H. D. Kumaraswamy.

== Early life ==
Prasanna Kumar was born on 17 November 1968. His father's name is Krishnamurthy and his mother's name is Bhagirati Bai. He lost his father at an early age and had to support his family.

Kumar did his schooling at Deshiya Vidyashala Shimoga. He joined Acharya Tulasi College for his B.Com. He could not study further due to financial problems.
