= Jal Shakti Abhiyan =

Water conservation campaign of the Government of India

- जल शक्ति अभियान

Agency overview
- Formed: 1 July 2019
- Jurisdiction: India
- Headquarters: New Delhi
- Minister responsible: C. R. Patil, Minister of Jal Shakti
- Parent agency: Ministry of Jal Shakti
- Website: jsactr.mowr.gov.in

The Jal Shakti Abhiyan (transl. Water Power Campaign) is a water conservation campaign of the Government of India, administered by the Ministry of Jal Shakti. Launched on 1 July 2019 by Union Minister Gajendra Singh Shekhawat, the campaign was conceived as a response to acute water stress across India. In its initial phase, the programme targeted 256 water-stressed districts identified by the Central Ground Water Board. Since 2021, it has operated under the expanded name "Jal Shakti Abhiyan: Catch the Rain" and has been conducted annually across all districts in the country.

== Background ==
A 2018 report by NITI Aayog, titled the Composite Water Management Index, stated that approximately 600 million people in India faced high to extreme water stress. The report warned that 21 major cities, including Delhi, Bengaluru, Chennai, and Hyderabad, risked running out of groundwater by 2030, and that the crisis could cost up to six per cent of India's gross domestic product by 2050. India holds 18 per cent of the world's population but has access to only four per cent of global freshwater resources; per capita water availability had declined to approximately 1,100 cubic metres, below the internationally recognised water stress threshold of 1,700 cubic metres. Groundwater, which supplies over 60 per cent of irrigated agriculture and 85 per cent of rural drinking water in India, had experienced a significant increase in extraction over the preceding decades.

In May 2019, the Government of India formed the Ministry of Jal Shakti by merging the Ministry of Water Resources, River Development and Ganga Rejuvenation with the Ministry of Drinking Water and Sanitation. Prime Minister Narendra Modi, in his Mann Ki Baat radio address, called on citizens to treat water conservation as a mass movement comparable to the Swachh Bharat Mission.

== First phase (2019) ==
The Jal Shakti Abhiyan was launched on 1 July 2019 as a time-bound, mission-mode campaign in 1,592 blocks across 256 water-stressed districts. Implementation occurred in two phases: the first from 1 July to 15 September 2019, coinciding with the southwest monsoon, and the second from 1 October to 30 November 2019 for states receiving the northeast retreating monsoon.

The campaign focused on five interventions: water conservation and rainwater harvesting; renovation of traditional water bodies and tanks; reuse of water and recharge of bore wells; watershed development; and intensive afforestation. These were supported by the development of block- and district-level water conservation plans and the promotion of efficient irrigation through Krishi Vigyan Kendras. The programme was coordinated by the Department of Drinking Water and Sanitation with the participation of multiple central ministries and state governments.

Down To Earth, an Indian environmental magazine, reported that while the campaign was built on the principle of citizen participation, it lacked clearly defined and measurable outcome targets.

== Catch the Rain expansion (2021–present) ==
The campaign was not conducted in 2020 due to the COVID-19 pandemic in India. On 22 March 2021, World Water Day, Prime Minister Modi launched "Jal Shakti Abhiyan: Catch the Rain" with the slogan "Catch the rain, where it falls, when it falls." Unlike the 2019 campaign, this expanded programme covered all blocks in all districts across India, encompassing both rural and urban areas. The programme has been conducted annually since, with each edition carrying a thematic focus.

The 2024 edition adopted the theme "Nari Shakti se Jal Shakti" (Women's Power for Water Power), emphasising the role of women in water conservation. The 2025 edition, launched from Panchkula, Haryana, by Union Minister C. R. Patil, focused on grassroots engagement in 148 districts identified by the Central Ground Water Board.

== Outcomes ==
According to government figures, over 46 lakh (4.6 million) water conservation and rainwater harvesting works were completed or initiated between the March 2021 launch and December 2021, alongside the planting of over 36 crore (360 million) saplings. By 2024, the government reported that 24.24 lakh (2.4 million) water bodies had been enumerated in what it described as the country's first such census, and more than 670 Jal Shakti Kendras (water resource centres) had been established across states and union territories.

WaterAid India, in an analytical report on the campaign, noted instances of significant community mobilisation at the district level, including participatory vulnerability assessments and water budgeting. However, independent evaluations of overall programme effectiveness remain limited, and the government's reported statistics have not been subject to comprehensive third-party audit.

== Relationship to other programmes ==
The Jal Shakti Abhiyan is distinct from the Jal Jeevan Mission, which aims to provide piped drinking water to every rural household, and from the Atal Bhujal Yojana, a World Bank-supported groundwater management programme. The government has described these programmes as operating in convergence, with the Jal Shakti Abhiyan serving as the umbrella campaign for community-level water conservation and awareness.

== See also ==
- Water scarcity in India
- Jal Jeevan Mission
- Ministry of Jal Shakti
- Swachh Bharat Mission
- Atal Bhujal Yojana
- Namami Gange Programme
