= B. Y. Raghavendra =

Indian politician

Member of Parliament, Lok Sabha
- Incumbent
- Assumed office 6 November 2018
- Preceded by: B. S. Yeddyurappa
- Constituency: Shimoga
- In office 16 May 2009 – 16 May 2014
- Preceded by: Sarekoppa Bangarappa
- Succeeded by: B. S. Yeddyurappa
- Constituency: Shimoga

Personal details
- Born: 16 August 1973 (age 53) Shikaripur, Mysore State (present day Karnataka), India
- Party: Bharatiya Janata Party
- Spouse: Thejaswini
- Children: 2
- Parents: B. S. Yeddyurappa (father); Mythradevi (mother)
- Education: B.B.M
- As of 6 November, 2018

Bookanakere Yeddyurappa Raghavendra (born 16 August 1973) is an Indian politician and a member of the 16th Lok Sabha representing Shimoga district of Karnataka and was a member of 14th Karnataka Legislative Assembly. He previously represented Shikaripura Assembly constituency of Karnataka and is a member of the Bharatiya Janata Party (BJP).

In the by-elections to Karnataka Legislative Assembly, he defeated H S Shantaveerappa of the Indian National Congress.

In the 15th Lok Sabha elections, he contested against the former Chief Minister of Karnataka Sarekoppa Bangarappa in the Shimoga constituency and won by a margin of 52,893 votes.

Raghavendra is also the Managing Trustee of PES Institute of Technology and Management, Shimoga.

Raghavendra belongs to the Lingayat community, a dominant community in Karnataka. He is the son of ex Chief Minister of Karnataka B. S. Yediyurappa and late Maithradevi. His brother is B. Y. Vijayendra

In March 2024, he was announced as the BJP candidate for the Shimoga constituency in the 2024 general elections, a post which he has held thrice in the past.
