= Mandya University =

State University in Karnataka

- Motto: ಮನುಜಮತ ವಿಶ್ವಪಥ
- Motto in English: Humanity is way to the world
- Type: Public
- Established: 2019
- Vice-Chancellor: Professor Dr. K. Shivachithappa
- Location: Mandya, Karnataka, India; 12.522°N 76.900°E

Mandya University is a public state university located in Mandya, Karnataka, India. It was established in 2019 to serve as a center of higher education and research for the region.
