= Shikaripur =

Shikaripura
- Town
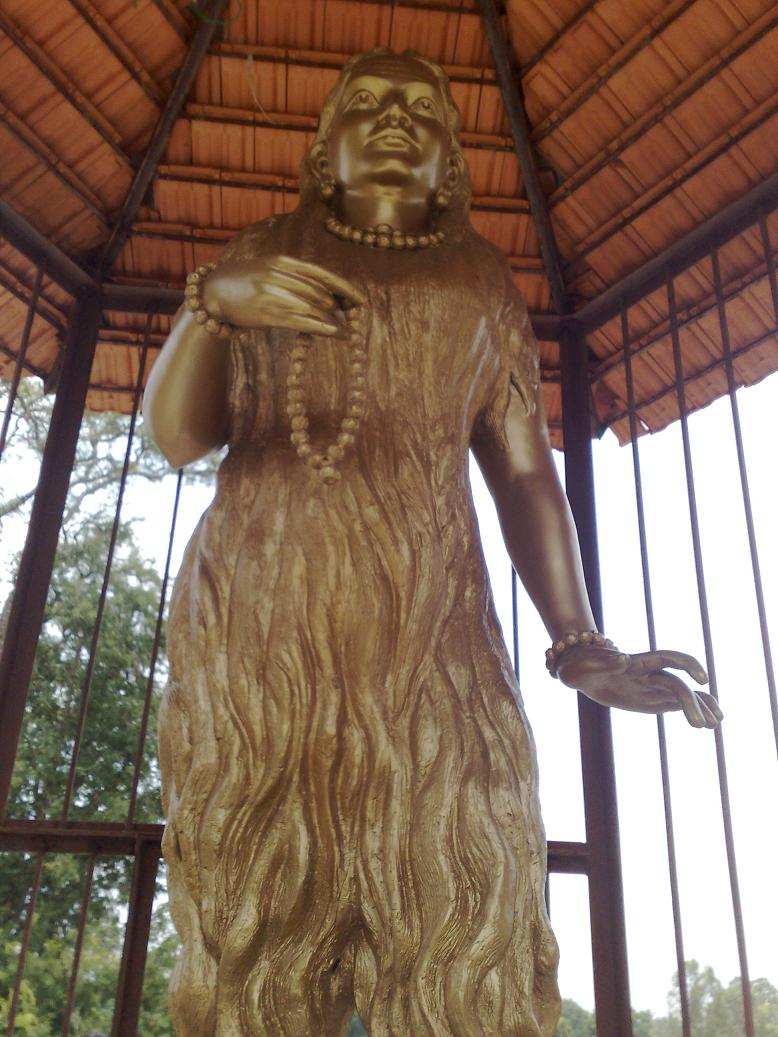
- Akkamahadevi Statue in Udathadi

- Location in Karnataka, India
- Coordinates: 14.27°N 75.35°E
- Country: India
- State: Karnataka
- District: Shivamogga
- Region: Malenadu

Area
  - Total: 18.76 km^{2} (7.24 sq mi)
- Elevation: 603 m (1,978 ft)

Population (2001)
  - Total: 31,508
  - Density: 1,680/km^{2} (4,350/sq mi)

Languages
  - Official: Kannada
- Time zone: UTC+5:30 (IST)
- Postal code: 577427
- Vehicle registration: KA 15 Sagara
- Vidhana Sabha constituency: Shikarpura

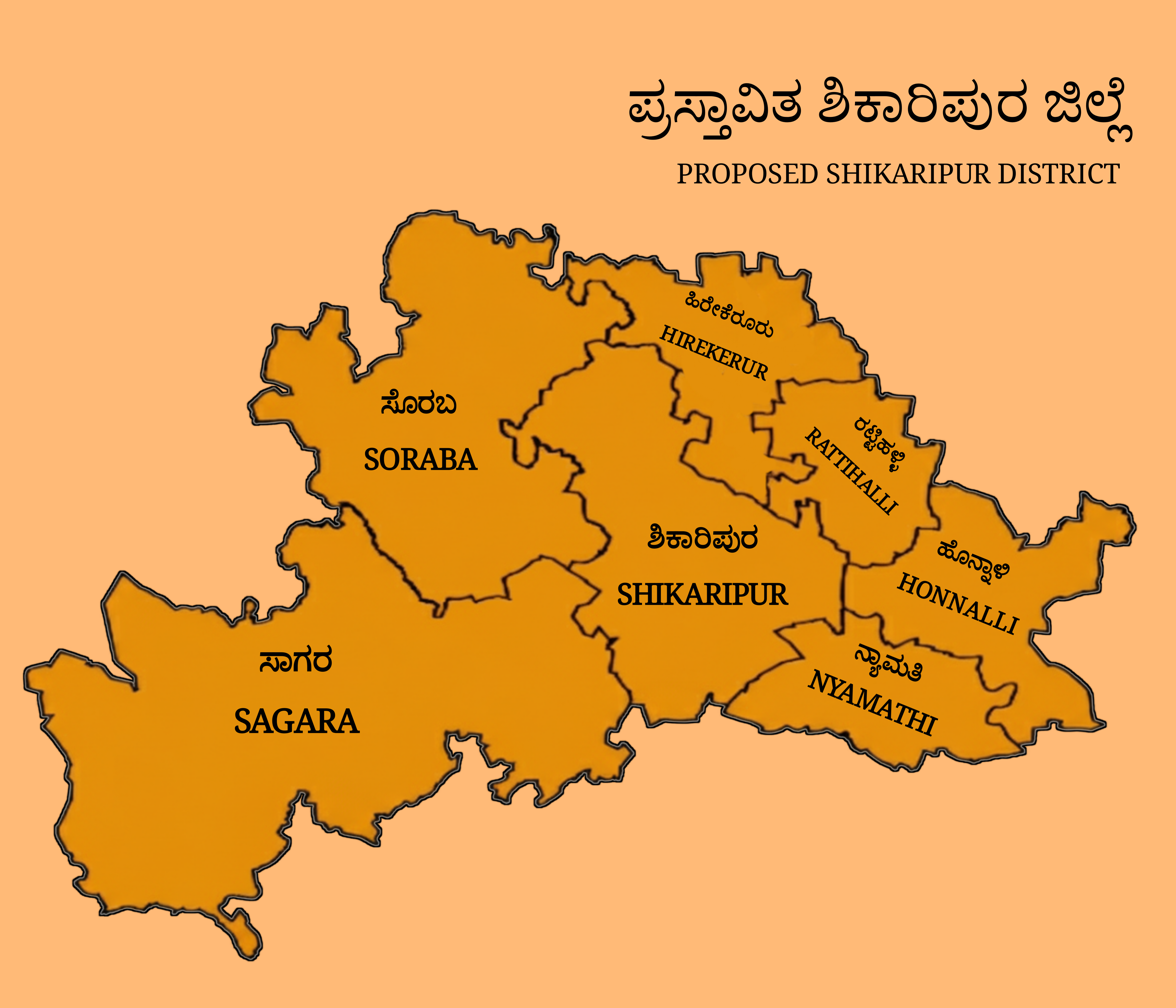
Proposal for the formation of separate Shikarpura district in 2019.

Shikaripura is a major town in Shimoga district in the Indian state of Karnataka. It is the headquarters of Shikaripura taluk and is known as the land of Shiva Sharanas.

== Geography ==
It has an average elevation of 603 m (1978 ft). It lies on tropical forests of Malenadu region. Shikaripura is one of the junction to connect north karnataka to Malenadu. And the river kumadvati flows from the town and nearest dams anjanapura and ambligola, nearest tourist places balligavi, udutadi, jogfalls, lionsafori, agumbe, koodachadri, kavaledurga fort, bhadra river project, gajnur dam, sakrebaylu.

== Demographics ==
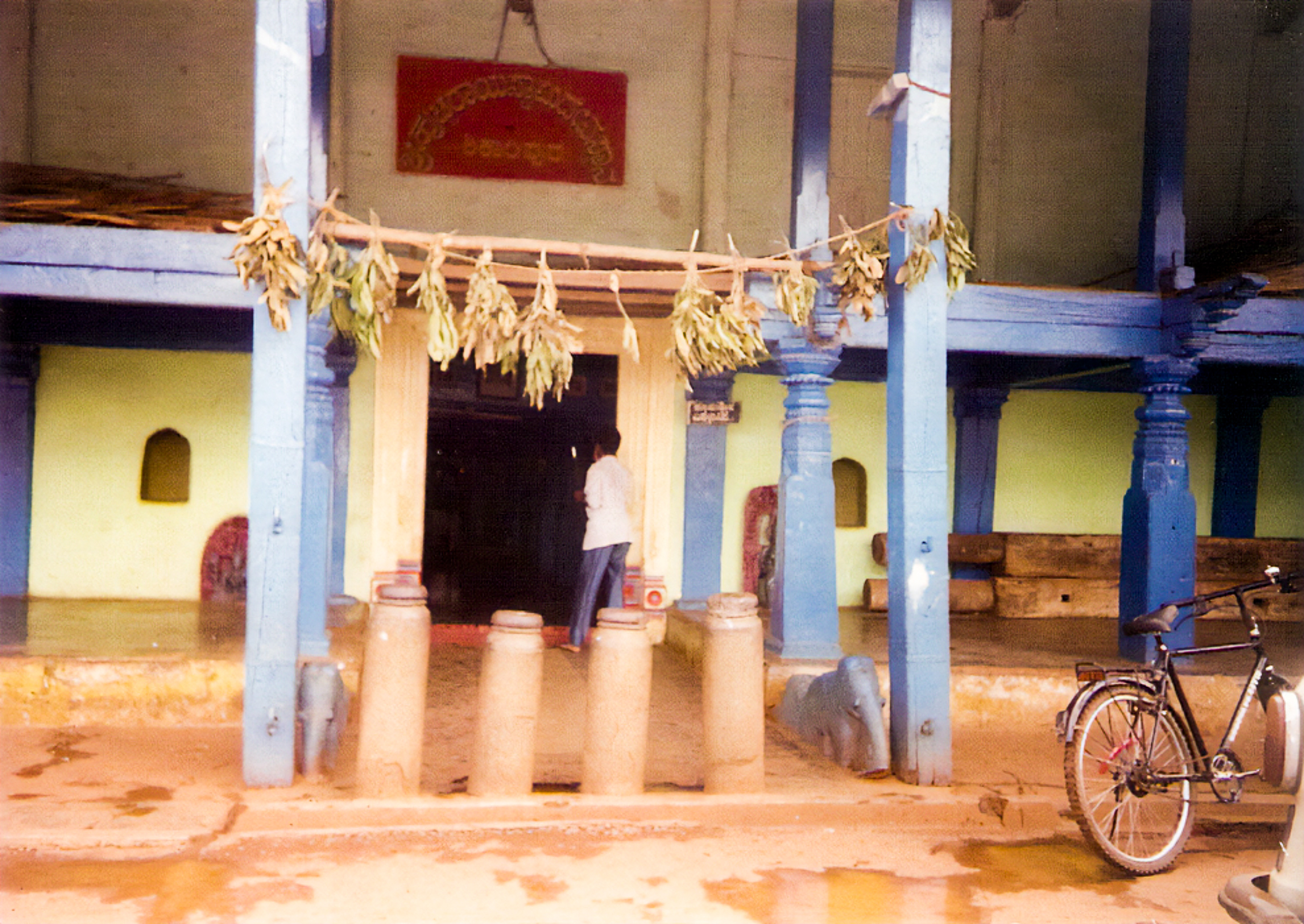
The Huccharaya Swamy temple in Shikaripura

As of 2001 India census, Shikaripura had a population of 31,508. Males constituted 51% of the population and females 49%. Shikaripura had an average literacy rate of 71%, higher than the national average of 59.5%: male literacy was 75%, and female literacy was 67%. In Shikarpur, 12% of the population were under 6 years of age.

== Proposal for the formation of new district ==
In 2008, B. S. Yediyurappa proposed splitting Shivamogga district into two parts, creating a separate Shikaripur district.
