= List of Lingayats =

Lingayats
Regions with significant populations
- India Other significant population centers: United States; United Kingdom; Australia

Languages
- Kannada; Marathi; Telugu; Konkani; Tamil; Malayalam

Religion
- Lingayat(Lingayatism)

Related ethnic groups
- Dravidian

Lingayats, also known as Veerashaiva /ˈvɪərəʃaɪvə/, are a community in India who adhere to Lingayatism, a religious sect of Shaivism within Hinduism. This is a list of notable Lingayats:

== Saints ==
- Akka Mahadevi
- Allama Prabhu
- Basava
- Channabasavanna
- Ambigara Chowdaiya
- Devar Dasimayya
- Siddheshwar – of Solapur, Maharashtra
- Viswabandhu Marulasiddha
- Sharane Sri Danamma Devi – of Guddapura, Maharashtra
- Sarvajna

== Historical rulers ==
- Kittur Chennamma(1778–1829) – queen of the princely state of Kitturu, Karnataka; fought against Doctrine of lapse
- Belawadi Mallamma
- Haleri Kings – of Madikeri
- Linga Rajendra II – Haleri king of Kodagu
- Chikka Virarajendra – last ruler of Madikeri
- Keladi Nayaka Kingdom
- Keladi Chennamma
- Shivappa Nayaka
- Hande Hanumappa Nayaka- Savior of Vijayanagara empire and first Hande ruler of Ballari

== Philanthropists ==
- Shivakumara Swamiji – head of Siddaganga Matha; Padma Bhushan awardee
- Gubbi Thotadappa - founder of famous Thotadappa hostel.

== Education, science and technology ==
- D. C. Pavate - Vice chancellor of Karnataka University, Dharawada, Padmabhushan awardee.
- Dr. DG Hallikeri – freedom fighter and educationist
- A. S. Adke – former vice-chancellor of Karnataka University and former Principal of Karnataka Regional Engineering College, Surathkal
- M. Mahadevappa – agricultural scientist and plant breeder; Padma Bhushan awardee
- Dr. MC Modi – eye surgeon and Padma Bhushan awardee
- S. G. Balekundri – irrigation expert and architect of Alamatti Dam
- Y. G. Parameshwara – first Indian blind doctor
- A.N. Prabhu Deva – former vice-chancellor of Bangalore University
- S. J. Nagalotimath – medical writer
- A. S. Kiran Kumar – Chairman of Indian Space Research Organisation (ISRO), Secretary, Department of Space, Chairman of Space Commission and Padma Shri awardee

== Literature ==
- Sarvajna – Kannada poet
- Chamarasa – author of Prabhulingaleele
- Harihara – known as Ragaleya Kavi
- Palkuriki Somanatha – Telugu poet, author of Basava purana
- Nijaguna Shivayogi – 15th-century Kannada poet
- Hardekar Manjappa – known as Gandhi of Karnataka
- Phakirappa Gurubasappa Halakatti – Kannada writer
- G. S. Shivarudrappa – Poet and critic, Rashtra Kavi
- Chennaveera Kanavi – poet and critic
- Panchakshari Hiremath – writer and poet, short story writer, essayist, critic, translator, orator, editor, who writes in Kannada, Urdu and Hindi
- P. Lankesh – writer and journalist, writing in the Kannada language
- Jayadevi Taayi Ligade – writer; first lady president of akhila Bharatha Kannada saahitya sammelana
- M. M. Kalburgi – Kannada scholar, Researcher, Vice Chancellor or Hampi Kannada University
- H.S. Shivaprakash- Poet, Playwright
- L. Basavaraju – Kannada eminent scholar and writer of several books on Sharana Sahitya
- Sangamesh Saundattimath – Dravidian linguist
- M. Chidananda Murthy – Kannada writer, researcher and historian
- Channappa Uttangi – interfaith pioneer and writer
- K. Marulasiddappa – Kannada writer
- Chandrashekhar Patil – Kannada poet and playwright
- Patil Puttappa – Kannada writer and former member of parliament, Rajya Sabha
- Manu Baligar – former bureaucrat, and current president of Kannada Sahitya Parishat

== Art and music ==
- Pandit Ganayogi Panchakshara Gawai – Hindustani and classical musician
- Basavaraj Rajguru – classical vocalist, Padma Bhushan awardee
- Mallikarjun Mansur – Hindustani vocalist, Padma Vibhushan, Kalidas Samman awardee
- Rajshekhar Mansur-Hindustani vocalist
- Kumar Gandharva – Hindustani vocalist, Padma Vibhushan, Kalidas Samman awardee
- Pandit Puttaraj Gawai – Hindustani and classical musician, Padma Bhushan, Kalidas Samman awardee
- Mukul Shivputra – Hindustani classical music vocalist and son of Kumar Gandharva
- Balappa Hukkeri – Kannada folk singer
- Rajashekhar Mansur – classical vocalist
- Gubbi Veeranna – theatre director, known as 'father of Kannada film industry'
- B. Jayashree - theatre
- Ranjani Shettar – artist and sculpurist
- Vyjayanthi Kashi – artist and Kuchipudi dancer
- Prateeksha Kashi – kuchipudi dancer

== Politics ==
=== Chief Ministers ===
Photo	Name	State
	S. Nijalingappa	Karnataka
	B. D. Jatti	Karnataka
	S. R. Kanthi	Karnataka
	Veerendra Patil	Karnataka
	S. R. Bommai	Karnataka
	J. H. Patel	Karnataka
	B. S. Yediyurappa	Karnataka
	Jagadish Shettar	Karnataka
	Basavaraj Bommai	Karnataka

=== Other politicians ===
- Shivraj Patil – Home Minister of India 2004–2008, Speaker of Lok Sabha 1991–1996, Minister of Defence 1980–1989, Governor of Punjab 2010–2015, Governor of Rajasthan 2010-2012
- K. P. Puttanna Chetty – First President of Bangalore Municipality
- M. S. Gurupadaswamy – Leader of House of Rajya Sabha 1989–1990, Leader of Opposition in the Rajya Sabha 1971–1972, Minister of Agriculture
- Laxman Savadi – former Deputy Chief Minister, former Minister for Transport and Minister for Co-operation, Government of Karnataka
- J. C. Madhu Swamy - ex Minister for Law and Parliamentary Affairs, and Minor Irrigation, Government of Karnataka
- B. C. Patil - ex Minister for Agriculture, Government of Karnataka
- V. Somanna - ex Minister for Housing, Government of Karnataka
- C. C. Patil – ex Minister for Public Works Department, former Minister for Mines and Geology, Government of Karnataka
- Shashikala Annasaheb Jolle – ex Minister for Women and Child development, Senior Citizen and differently abled Empowerment, Government of Karnataka and MLA, Nippani
- Eshwara Bhimanna Khandre – MLA and former Minister, Government of Karnataka
- K. S. Nagarathanamma - former Speaker and Leader of opposition of Karnataka Legislative Assembly, and minister for Health and family welfare.
- S. Mallikarjunaiah – former MP Tumkur and Deputy Speaker of the Lok Sabha (1991–1996)
- M.P. Prakash – Congress Leader and former deputy chief minister of Karnataka
- M. B. Patil – former Minister for Water Resources, Government of Karnataka
- Suresh Angadi – Minister of State for Railways, Government of India
- Suresh Shetkar – former MP of Zahirabad (Lok Sabha constituency), Telangana
- Gudleppa Hallikeri – freedom fighter and former chairman of Legislative Council,
- M. V. Rajasekharan – former Minister of State in the Ministry of Planning, Government of India
- H.Siddhaveerappa – former minister for Home, Industries and Health, Leader of opposition, Government of Karnataka
- Murugesh Nirani – former Minister for Heavy Industry, Government of Karnataka
- S. S. Mallikarjun – MLA, Karnataka and Minister for Horticulture, Mines & Geology, Government of Karnataka
- S. A. Ravindranath – former minister for Horticulture and Sugar, government of Karnataka
- Gowdar Mallikarjunappa Siddeswara – Union Minister of State for Heavy Industries and Public Enterprises
- Smt.Basavarajeswari – three time MP from Bellary and former Union Minister of India
- Siddappa Kambli – politician, freedom fighter and contributor for Unification of Karnataka
- Ratnappa Kumbhar – former MP, MLC and Minister of Home, Food and Civil Supplies in Maharashtra Government
- Babagouda Patil – BJP Leader, former MP and Union Minister of Rural Areas & Employment
- Basangouda Patil – former Union minister of state for Railways and Textiles
- Dr Neeraj Patil – former mayor of Lambeth, London
- Vatal Nagaraj – former MLA and founder leader of Kannada Chalavali Vatal Paksha
- B. Y. Raghavendra – MP Shimoga; son of CM B. S. Yeddyurappa
- M. P. Renukacharya – MLA and former Minister for Excise, Government of Karnataka
- D. C. Srikantappa – former three time MP from Chikmagalur
- Basavaraj Patil Sedam – former member of Lok Sabha and Rajya Sabha
- M. Rajasekara Murthy – former Union minister for Surface Transport, MP, Lok Sabha and Rajya Sabha, and former minister for Finance, Revenue, Excise and Commerce and Industry, Karnataka
- Dilip Gangadhar Sopal – former MLA, Barshi, Solapur, and former minister for Law and Judiciary, and Water supply and Sanitation, Government of Maharashtra
- Shashil G. Namoshi – former Member of Legislative Council, Karnataka
- Basavaraj Patil Attur – former minister for Higher Education, Small Scale Industries, and Minor Irrigation
- Anant Gudhe – former member of parliament, Amravati
- Chandrakant Khaire – former member of parliament, Aurangabad
- Shamanuru Shivashankarappa – MLA, Davanagere South, former Minister for Horticulture and Agro Marketing, Government of Karnataka and President, Akhila Bharatha Veerashaiva Mahasabha
- H. K. Patil – former Minister for Rural Development and Panchayat Raj, Government of Karnataka
- Sharan Prakash Patil – former Minister for Medical Education, Government of Karnataka
- S. R. Patil – former Minister for Infrastructure, Information Technology, Biotechnology, Science and Technology, Planning and Statistics, Government of Karnataka
- H. S. Mahadeva Prasad – former Minister for Co-operation, Government of Karnataka
- Prakash Babanna Hukkeri – Member of Parliament, Chikkodi and former Minister for Sugar, Small Scale Industries and Endowments, Government of Karnataka
- Bhagwanth Khuba – Minister of State for Chemicals and Fertilizers, New and Renewable Energy of India and member of parliament, Bidar
- P. C. Gaddigoudar – Member of Parliament, Bagalkot
- Karadi Sanganna Amarappa – Member of Parliament, Koppal (Lok Sabha constituency)
- B. Jayashree – artist and former member of Rajya Sabha, Padma Shri awardee
- Annasaheb Jolle - Member of Parliament, Chikkodi.
- B B Patil – Member of Parliament, Zahirabad (Lok Sabha constituency), Telangana
- Satish Hiremath – former mayor of Oro Valley, Arizona, United States of America
- Manjunath Kunnur – former MP, Dharwad South
- Basavraj Madhavrao Patil – MLA, Ausa, Latur, and former Minister for Rural Development, Government of Maharashtra
- Siddharam Satlingappa Mhetre – MLA, Akkalkot, Solapur, and former Minister for Home and Rural Development, Government of Maharashtra
- Karne Prabhakar – MLC, Telangana, and Spokesperson of BRS
- Vijay Deshmukh – former Minister of state for PWD, Transport, Labour and Textiles, Government of Maharashtra, and MLA, Solapur North
- Vinay Kulkarni – former Minister for Mines and Geology, Government of Karnataka, and MLA, Dharwad
- Ganesh Hukkeri – Member of Legislative Assembly, Chikkodi
- Lakshmi Hebbalkar – Member of Legislative Assembly and former president, Karnataka Pradesh Congress Committee women's wing
- B. Y. Vijayendra - president of Bharatiya Janata Party Karnataka state unit
- Rahul Siddhvinayak Bondre - MLA, Maharashtra
- Prabha Mallikarjun - Member of Parliament, Davanagere Lok Sabha constituency
- Sagar Khandre - Member of Parliament, Bidar Lok Sabha constituency
- Chandrashekhar S. Patil - Member of the Legislative Assembly, Kamalapur, Karnataka Assembly constituency

== Business ==
- Baba Kalyani - Founder and Chairman of Kalyani Group
- Gowdar Mallikarjunappa Siddeswara – MP and head of GM group
- Ashok Kheny – head of Nandi Infrastructure Corridor Project (NICE)
- Prabhakar B. Kore – Karnatak Lingayat Education Society (largest education society in the state), chairman, MP and former minister
- Murugesh Nirani – of Nirani Group
- Shamanuru Shivashankarappa – of Bapuji Educational Association
- Vijay Sankeshwar – Chairman of VRL Group

== Media and entertainment ==
- M. P. Shankar – veteran Kannada film actor and director
- Doddanna – veteran Kannada actor
- Manjula – actress
- B.C. Patil – Kannada actor
- Prabhu deva – Indian actor, known as the Indian Michael Jackson
- Mugur Sundar – Indian director
- Raju Sundaram – Tamil actor
- Nagendra Prasad – actor
- Gubbi Veeranna – theatre director
- B. C. Gowrishankar – choreographer
- K. M. Chaitanya – director
- Sharath Lohitashwa – actor
- Lohithaswa – actor and writer
- Kavitha Lankesh – writer and director
- Gauri Lankesh - journalist
- Vedhika Kumar – actress and model
- Chindodi Leela – actress and dramatist, Padmashri awardee
- Indrajit Lankesh – director
- Preetham Gubbi – director
- Dilip – South Indian actor
- Girija Shettar – actress
- Chetan Kumar – actor
- Shashank – Kannada director
- Uma Shivakumar – actress
- Vaijanath Biradar – comedy actor
- P. Neelakantan – Tamil director
- Sunil Nagappa – actor
- Sanchari Vijay – actor, winner of Best actor award in 62nd National Film Awards
- Anoop Seelin – music director
- Dhananjay – Kannada actor
- Naga Kiran – Kannada actor
- Kishore Kumar – South Indian actor
- Sumanth Shailendra – Kannada actor
- Pushkara Mallikarjunaiah - Kannada Producer
- Aditi Prabhudeva - Kannada actress
- Chitkala Biradar - actress
- Dileep Raj - Actor, Director, Producer

== Sports ==
- Prarthana Thombare – Indian tennis player
- Nanjangud Shivananju Manju – Indian footballer
- Laxmikant Kattimani – Indian footballer
- Gagan Ullalmath – Indian swimmer
- Manju Nadgoda – Indian cricketer
- Sujith Somasunder – Indian cricketer
- Satish Kumar – Indian taekwondo player
- Deepak Chougule – Indian cricketer
- Harishchandra Birajdar – wrestler and first Hind Kesari from Maharashtra, Commonwealth Games gold medallist, Dhyanchand Award recipient
- Yere Goud – Indian cricketer
- Kruthik Hanagavadi - Indian cricketer
- Shreyanka Patil - Indian woman cricketer
- Aditi Ashok - Indian golfer
- KL Rahul -Indian cricketer

== Military and police ==
- General Satyawant Mallanna Shrinagesh – 3rd Chief of Army Staff - Indian Army, and former governor of Assam, Andhra Pradesh and Mysore state
- Lieutenant General B. S. Raju, UYSM, AVSM, YSM – Vice Chief of the Army Staff of Indian Army, former Director General of Military Operations
- Lieutenant General M. V. Suchindra Kumar, PVSM, AVSM, YSM & bar, VSM is a serving general officer – Vice Chief of Indian Army
- Lieutenant General Ramesh Halagali, AVSM, SM – former Deputy Chief of Indian Army
- Col M. B. Ravindranath VrC - Indian Army Officer and Vir Chakra Awardee
- Shankar Bidari, IPS – former Director general of police, Karnataka and Commissioner of Police of Bangalore city
- L. Revanasiddaiah, IPS – former additional director, Central Bureau of Investigation, DGP, Karnataka and Commissioner of Police of Bangalore city
- B. G. Jyothi Prakash Mirji, IPS – former Commissioner of Police of Bangalore city
- Veeranna Aivalli, IPS – former chairman of Aviation Security Audit Programme, International Civil Aviation Organization, United Nations
- Mallikarjun Bande – slain Indian Police Sub-Inspector
- Lance Naik Hanumanthappa Koppad – Indian soldier
- V. C. Sajjanar, IPS - Telangana Police officer known as an Encounter Specialist

== Law and judiciary ==
- V. S. Malimath – former Chief Justice of Kerala and Karnataka
- Pramila Nesargi – advocate, politician and activist
- Mohan Shantanagoudar – Former Judge of the Supreme court of India and former Chief Justice of Kerala High Court
- S. R. Bannurmath - former Chief Justice of Kerala
- Ravi Malimath - current Chief Justice of Madhya Pradesh

== Others ==
- M. D. Nanjundaswamy – farmer leader and activist
- Subhash Mendhapurkar – social activist, Himachal Pradesh
- S. R. Hiremath – Indian environmental activist, Karnataka
