= Dharwad Assembly constituency (disambiguation) =

Dharwad Assembly constituency is a Vidhana Sabha constituency in Karnataka It may also refer to:

- Dharwad Assembly constituency
- Hubli-Dharwad Central Assembly constituency
- Hubli-Dharwad East Assembly constituency
- Hubli-Dharwad West Assembly constituency
- Dharwad Rural Assembly constituency, a defunct constituency
