= Mansur (disambiguation) =

Mansur is a given name and a surname.

Mansur may also refer to:

- Mansur, Dharwad, a village in Dharwad district, Karnataka, India
- Mansur, North Khorasan, a village in Ziarat Rural District, Central District of Shirvan County, North Khorasan Province, Iran
- Mansur, Qazvin, a village in Kharaqan-e Gharbi Rural District, Central District of Avaj County, Qazvin Province, Iran
- Mansur, Yazd, a village in Allahabad Rural District, Zarach District, Yazd County, Yazd Province, Iran
- Mansur, Astrakhan Oblast, Russia
- Mansur (crater), a crater on Mercury

== See also ==
- Al-Mansur (disambiguation)
- Shah Mansur
- Manzur
- Mansour (disambiguation)
- Mansoor (wrestler)
- Sheikh Mansur
