= Rajyotsava Awards (2003) =

Awards given by the government of Karnataka, India

2003 Rajyotsava Awards
- Date: 1 November 2003
- Location: Bangalore, Karnataka
- Country: India
- Presented by: Government of Karnataka
- Hosted by: Ravindra Kalakshetra

The list of Karnataka Rajyotsava Award recipients for the year 2003 is below.

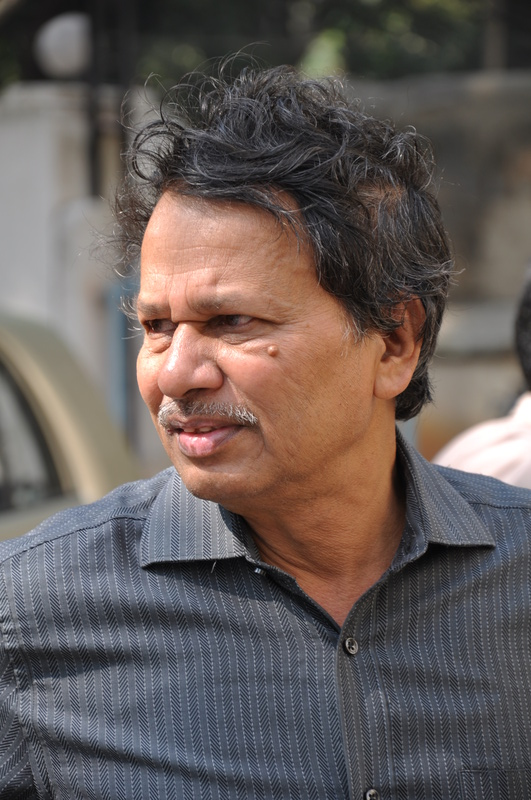
Baraguru Ramachandrappa

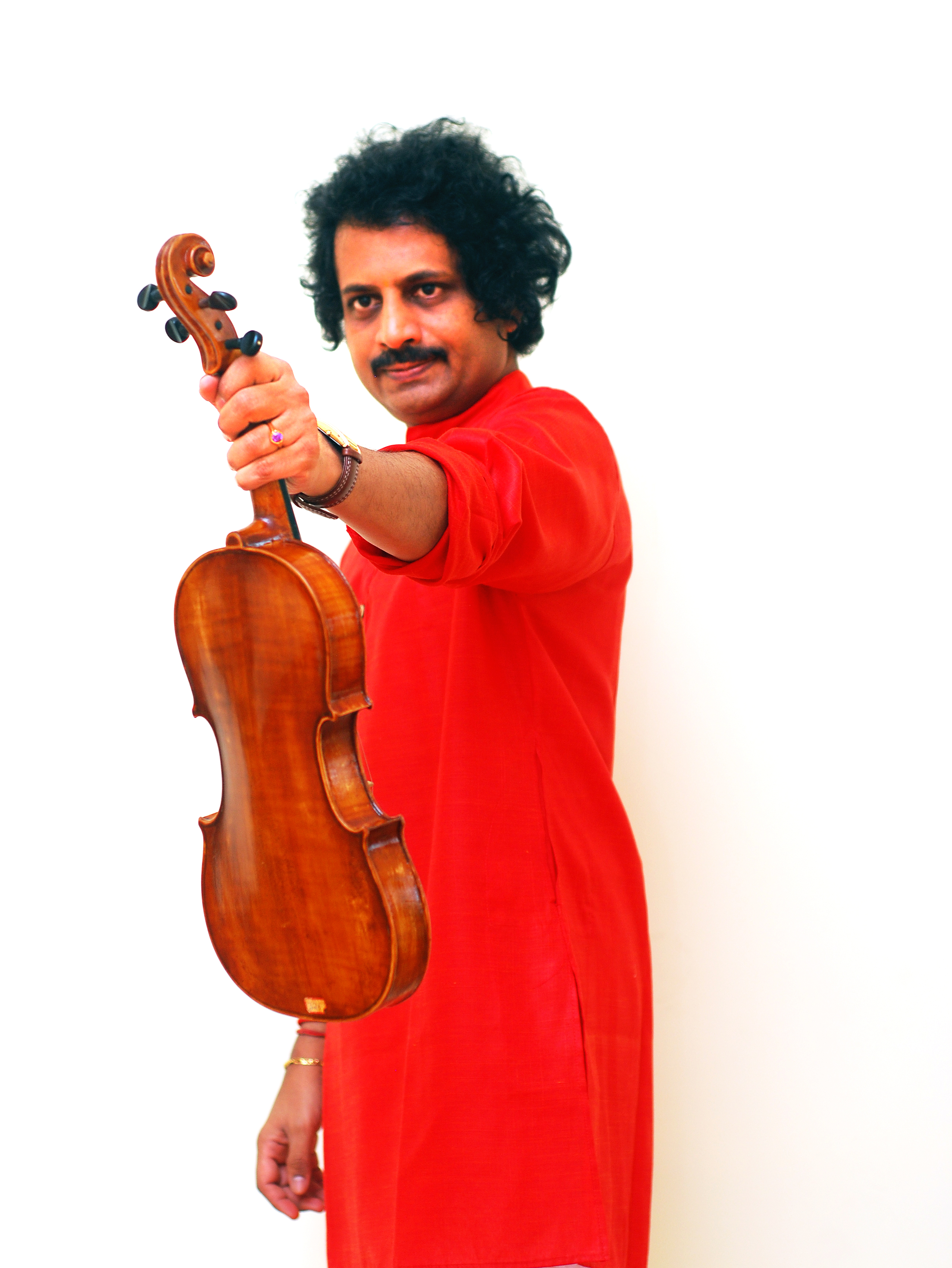
Mysore Manjunath

| Recipient | Field |
|---|---|
| Shankrayya Swami | Theatre |
| Baraguru Ramachandrappa | Literature |
| Somashekhar Imrapur | Literature |
| H. S. Venkateshamurthy | Literature |
| D. Lingaiah | Literature |
| Rajalakshmi Thirunarayana | Music |
| Sheikh Hannumia | Music |
| Rajguru Guruswamy Kalkeri | Music |
| Mysore Manjunath | Music |
| S. K. Vasumathi | Music |
| A. Sundara Murthy | Music |
| B. S. Sunanda Devi | Dance |
| M. B. Patil | Fine Arts |
| T. S. Nagabharana | Theatre |
| Prema Karanth | Theatre |
| L. Krishnappa | Theatre |
| P. Padma | Theatre |
| Devaputhra | Theatre |
| Kasim Saab Hussain Saab | Yakshagana |
| N. R. Nayak | Yakshagana |
| Madegowda | Yakshagana |
| Mallaiah Swamy | Yakshagana |
| Airodi Govindappa | Yakshagana |
| Baburao Kobal | Yakshagana |
| H. N. Krishnamurthy | Sculpture |
| Abdul Rehman | Social Work |
| Mohini Nayak | Social Work |
| A. S. Hegde | Medicine |
| U. S. Krishna Nayak | Medicine |
| Narapath Solanki | Medicine |
| Surendra Daani | Journalism |
| C. Kaiser Rehman | Journalism |
| M. A. Ponnappa | Journalism |
| H. Boniface Prabhu | Sports |
| S. Siddalingaiah | Cinema |
| Gangadhar | Cinema |
| Srinath | Cinema |
| B. V. Radha | Cinema |
| Thara Anuradha | Cinema |
| Vijayanath Shenoy | Creative Art |
| Radha Murthy | Creative Art |
| Vimala Rangachar | Creative Art |
| Kalpana Kar | Creative Art |
| B. V. Jagadish | Science |
| Sydney Kannada Koota | Overseas |
| Kumar Malavalli | Overseas Kannadiga |
| C. S. Krishna Shetty | Fine Arts |
| K. R. Thimmaraju | Others |
| J. Chandulal Jain | Others |
| Bharat Cancer Institute-Mysore | Others |
| Akshaya Patra Foundation-Bengaluru | Others |
| Pradhana Gurudatta | Others |
| Y. M. C. A | Others |
| K. Gururao | Others |
| S. M. Syed Khalil | Others |
| K. Marulasiddappa | Others |
| Vasundhara Kavalaphilios | Others |
| V. R. Gowrishankar | Others |
| Siddalingaiah Swamy Soppinamath | Education |
| M. R. Holla | Education |
| P. S. Gurusiddaiah | Yoga |
