= Chandrakant Bellad =

Indian politician

President of Border Area Development Authority Government of Karnataka
- In office 2008–2013
- Chief Minister: B. S. Yediyurappa; Sadananda Gowda; Jagadish Shettar

Member of Karnataka Legislative Assembly
- In office 2008–2013
- Preceded by: Seat established
- Succeeded by: Aravind Bellad
- Constituency: Hubli-Dharwad West
- In office 1994–2004
- Preceded by: S. R. Morey
- Succeeded by: S. R. Morey
- Constituency: Dharwad
- In office 1985–1989
- Preceded by: S. R. Morey
- Succeeded by: S. R. Morey
- Constituency: Dharwad

Personal details
- Born: 1938/39 Bellad Bagewadi, Belagavi district, Karnataka
- Party: Bharatiya Janata Party
- Spouse: Leelavathi Bellad
- Children: 4 daughters and 1 son (Aravind Bellad)
- Parent: Gurappa Bellad (father)
- Education: SSLC

Chandrakant Bellad is the former member of Karnataka Legislative Assembly and an Indian Politician. He first contested 1983 Karnataka Legislative Assembly elections as a Janata Party candidate from Dharwad Assembly constituency and lost by a wafer thin margin of 132 votes against S. R. Morey of Indian National Congress. Later he defeated the same candidate and emerged victorious in 1985 Karnataka Legislative Assembly elections. He unsuccessfully contested against then 3-time Indian National Congress MP D. K. Naikar from Dharwad North Lok Sabha constituency during 1991 Indian general elections. Despite not having any BJP MLA from then Dharwad district (comprising Dharwad, Haveri and Gadag districts in present day), Chandrakant Bellad gave a close fight by getting 29% votes which was just 22,209 less than D. K. Naikar. He was elected to Karnataka Legislative Assembly (from Dharwad Assembly constituency) in 1994 and 1999. He also represented Hubli-Dharwad West from 2008 to 2013. He was the President of Border Area Development Authority from 2008 to 2013. He announced retirement from active politics before 2013 Karnataka Legislative Assembly elections.

== Awards ==
He was awarded Kannada Chalavali Veerasenani M. Ramamurthy award by Kannada Sahitya Parishat in February 2021.

== Personal life ==
He was born to Gurappa Bellad in Bellad Bagewadi, Belagavi district of Karnataka. He married Leelavathi Bellad and the couple have 5 sons. His youngest son Aravind Bellad is representing Hubli-Dharwad West after his political retirement i.e., since 2013. The family runs business. He completed SSLC from RLS High School, Dharwad in 1965.

== Controversies ==
He accused former Chief Minister of Karnataka B. S. Yediyurappa of betraying him by denying Cabinet berth and went on to claim that he made B. S. Yediyurappa the Chief Minister of Karnataka. His son Aravind Bellad accused that his phone was tapped and complained to Police and then Home minister Basavaraj Bommai. However Chandrakant Bellad suggested B. S. Yediyurappa resign if BJP High-command instructs him.
