= Almanzor (disambiguation) =

Almanzor was a Muslim Arab Andalusi military leader and statesman.

Almanzor or Al-Mansur (the Arabic name) may also refer to:

- Al-Mansur (disambiguation), other persons with the same Arabic name
- Almanzor (horse), French racehorse
- Pico Almanzor (Almanzor Peak), mountain, Spain
- Almanzor, wizard in Almanzor's Rings, 1977 Soviet children's film
- Almanzor Hutchinson, American farmer and politician
- José Almanzor, Mexican archer
- 256796 Almanzor, minor planet

== See also ==
- Almansor
