= Arvind Bellad =

Indian politician

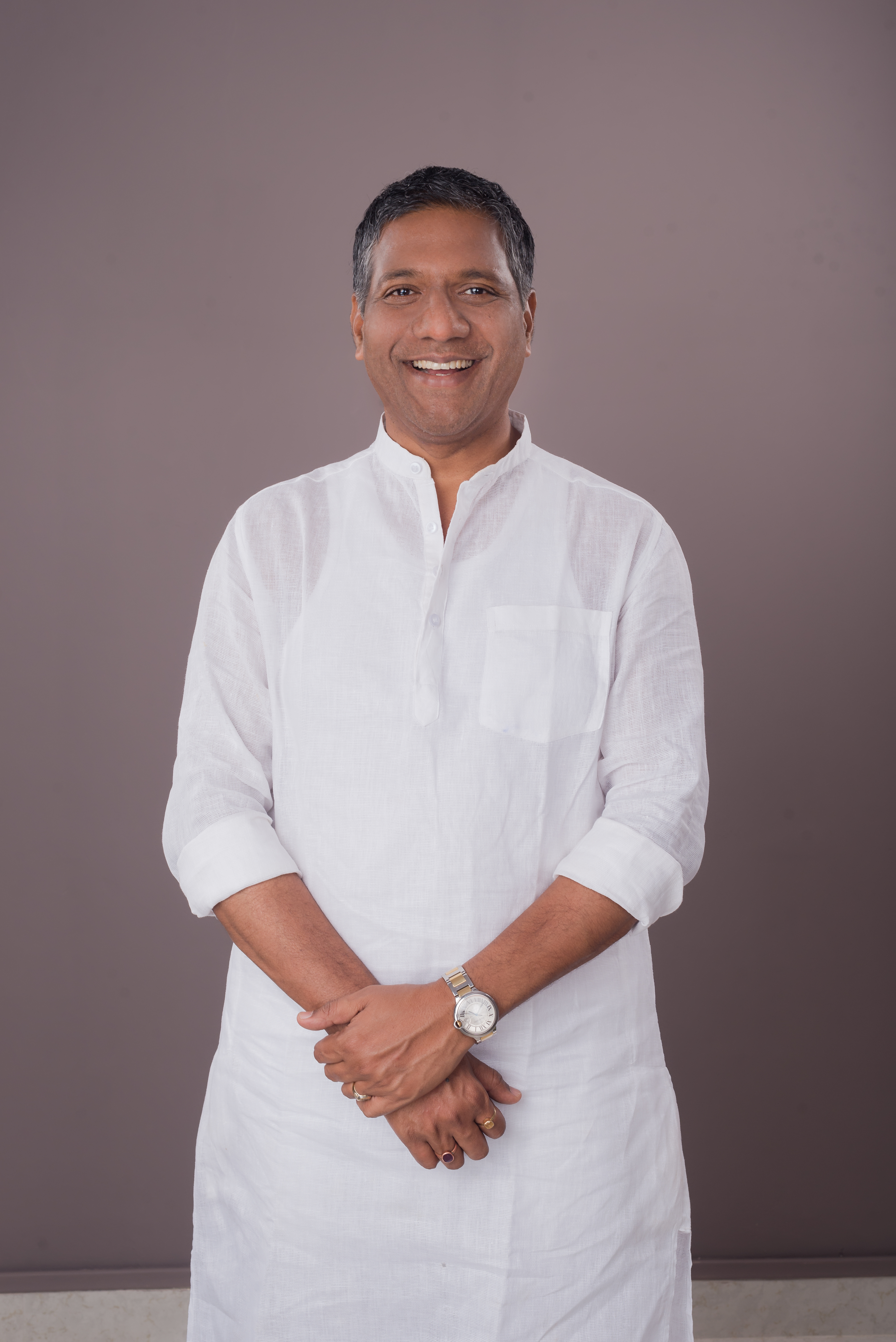

Deputy Leader of Opposition Karnataka Legislative Assembly
- Incumbent
- Assumed office 25 December 2023
- Preceded by: U. T. Khader

Member of the Karnataka Legislative Assembly
- Incumbent
- Assumed office 8 May 2013
- Preceded by: Chandrakant Bellad
- Constituency: Hubli-Dharwad West

Personal details
- Born: 3 August 1969 (age 57) Bellad Bagewadi, Mysore State (present-day Karnataka), India
- Party: Bharatiya Janata Party
- Spouse: Smriti Bellad
- Children: Agastya (son); Pracchi (daughter)
- Parents: Chandrakant Bellad (father); Leelavathi Bellad (mother)
- Education: B.E, PGDM
- Alma mater: INSEAD; SDM College of Engineering
- Occupation: Politician, Entrepreneur
- Website: http://arvindbellad.com/

Arvind Chandrakant Bellad (born 3 August 1969) is an Indian politician, who is a Member of Legislative Assembly of Karnataka, representing Hubli-Dharwad West constituency since May 2013. Bellad is a member of the Bharatiya Janata Party.

Arvind Bellad was appointed as Deputy Leader of Opposition in the Assembly from 2023.

== Early life and education ==
Born on 3 August 1969, Bellad is the son of veteran RSS leader and former MLA Chandrakant Bellad and Leelavathi Bellad. He is the youngest among five children, he graduated from KE Boards High School and Karnataka Science College Dharwad completed his engineering degree from SDM College of Engineering, Dharwad. He pursued his PGDM in business management from INSEAD in France.

He married Smriti Bellad and has two children, Agastya and Pracchi.

== Political career ==
Arvind Bellad entered politics in 2013. He contested from Hubli-Dharwad West constituency of Karnataka State Legislative Assembly from Bharatiya Janata Party (BJP) and won. He represented BJP in the Karnataka Legislative Assembly twice from Dharwad district.

Some important activities of Bellad include:

- Started LKG and UKG in government schools. He noticed the dip in school attendance of Government schools. After discussing with parents of the children, he started preschool as a pilot project in one school. This experiment was successful which led him to extend this idea to 62 government schools. There was a rise in the student intake due to this.
- Campaigned for setting up of an Indian Institute of Technology (IIT) at Dharwad. Due to these efforts, an IIT has been set up at Dharwad.
- Worked for developing and implementing clean energy in rural areas. He conducted the study, prepared a report and started implementing it.
- Created a mobile phone app to listen to the grievances of the people of his constituency.
