= Seema Masuti =

Indian politician

Seema Masuti (born 1972) is an Indian politician from Karnataka. She is a former Member of the Legislative Assembly from Dharwad Assembly constituency in Dharwad district representing the Bharatiya Janata Party.

Seema is from Dharwad. She married Ashok Byrappa Masuti. She completed Class 12 and joined BA at Karnataka Arts University but discontinued in the second year in 1992.

Seema was first elected as an MLA winning the 2008 Karnataka Legislative Assembly election from Dharwad Assembly constituency representing the Bharatiya Janata Party. She polled 35,417 votes and defeated her nearest rival, Vinay Kulkarni of the Indian National Congress, by a margin of 723 votes. In 2018, she resigned from BJP after she was denied a ticket for the Assembly election. Contesting on BJP ticket, she finished fourth in the 2013 Karnataka Legislative Assembly election that was won by Vinay Kulkarni of the Indian National Congress.
