= Hiremath =

Hiremath is a surname originating from the North Karnataka region of India and it belongs to the Veerashaiva Jangam community. According to the Encyclopaedia of Indian Surnames (2002), the surname indicates association with a particular religious institution: the prefix "Hire" is the name of a matha. "Hire" in Kannada is derived from "Hiriya" which mean senior, first born, elder, great, elderly or superior. Notable people with this surname include:

- Panchakshari Hiremath (born 1933), Indian writer and poet
- R. C. Hiremath (1920–1998), Indian writer
- Satish Hiremath (born 1963), American politician
- Shirish Hiremath (born 1951), Indian cardiologist
- S. R. Hiremath, Indian activist
