= Rajyotsava Awards (2010) =

Awards given by the government of Karnataka, India

2010 Rajyotsava Awards
- Date: 1 November 2010
- Location: Bangalore, Karnataka
- Country: India
- Presented by: Government of Karnataka

The list of Karnataka Rajyotsava Award recipients for the year 2010 is below.

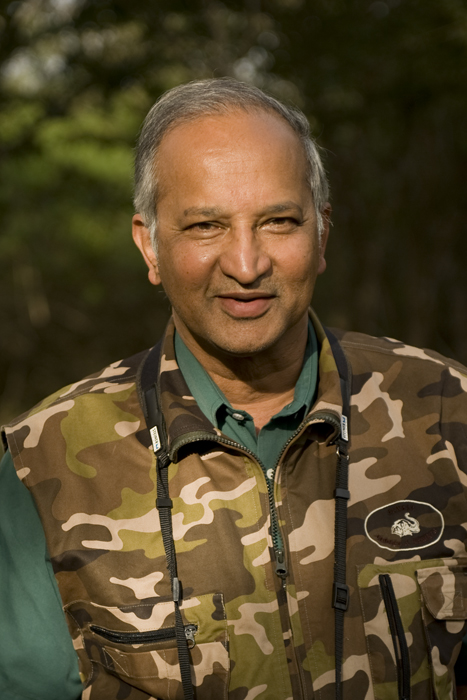
K. Ullas Karanth

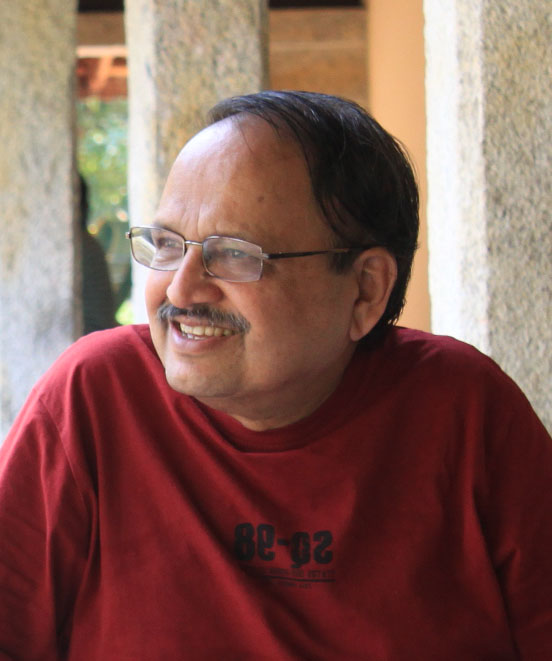
K. V. Narayana

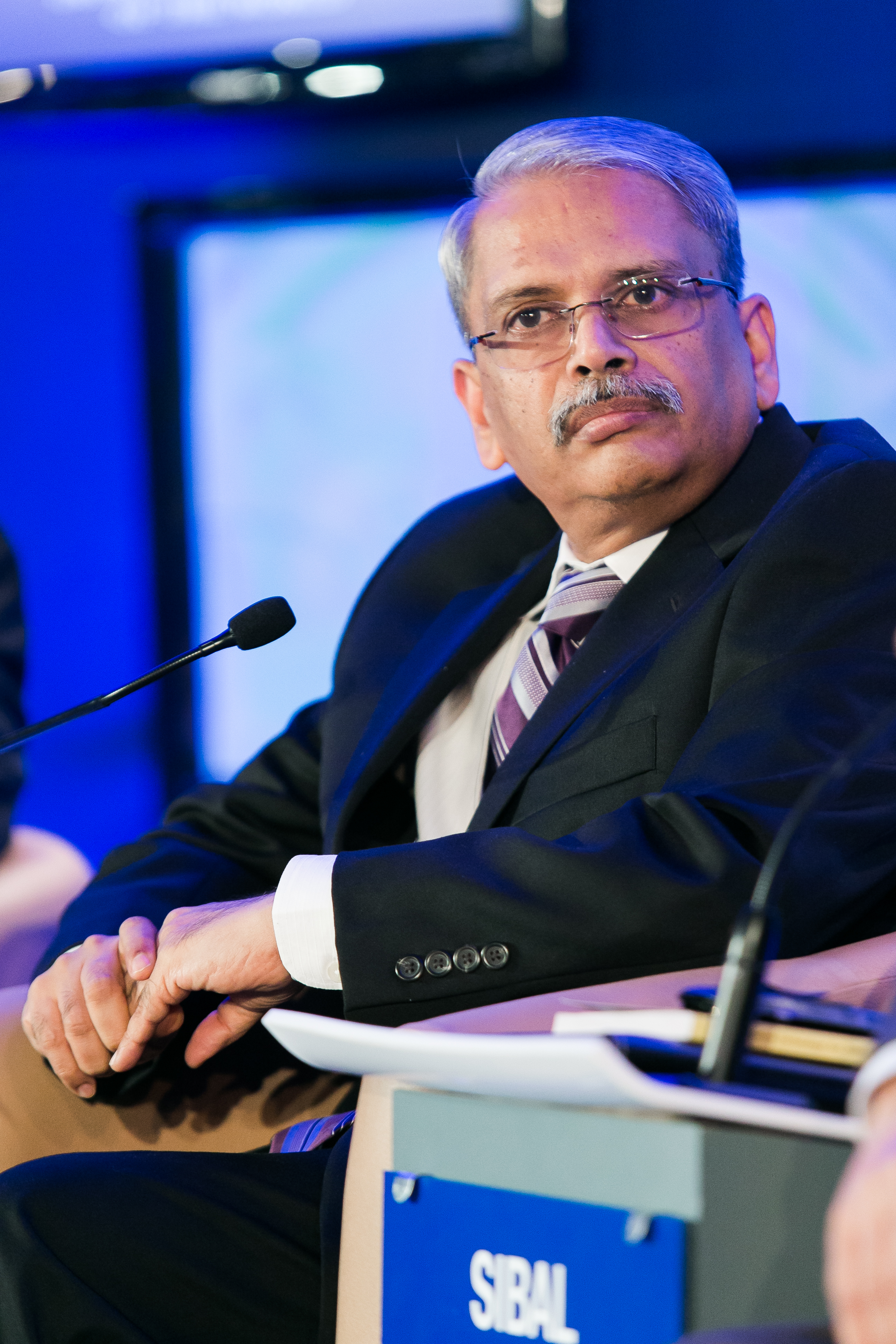
Kris Gopalakrishnan

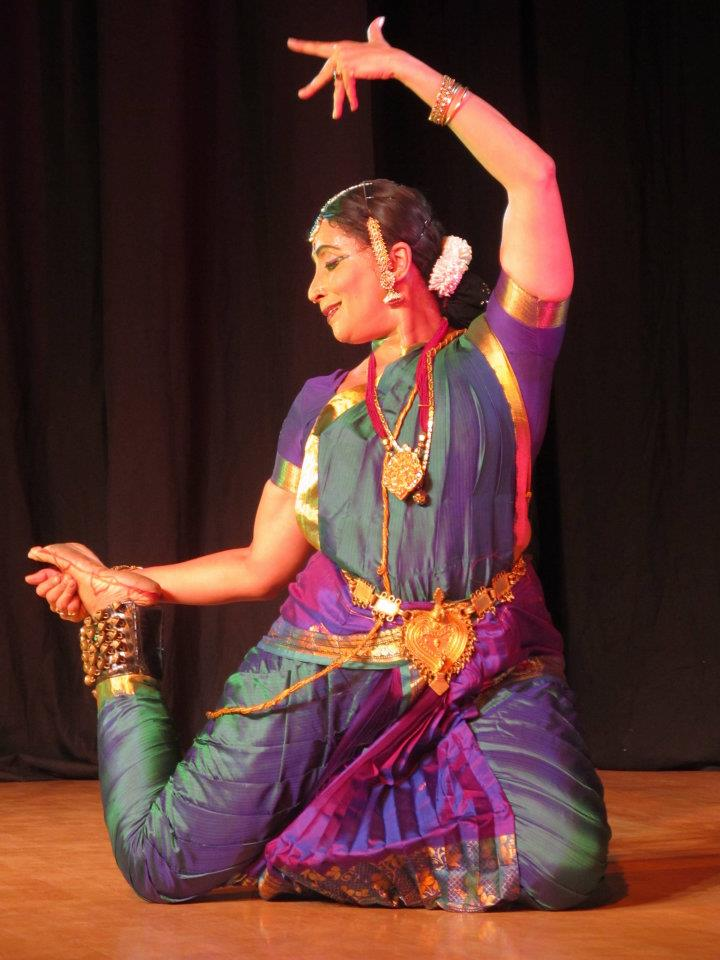
Vyjayanthi Kashi

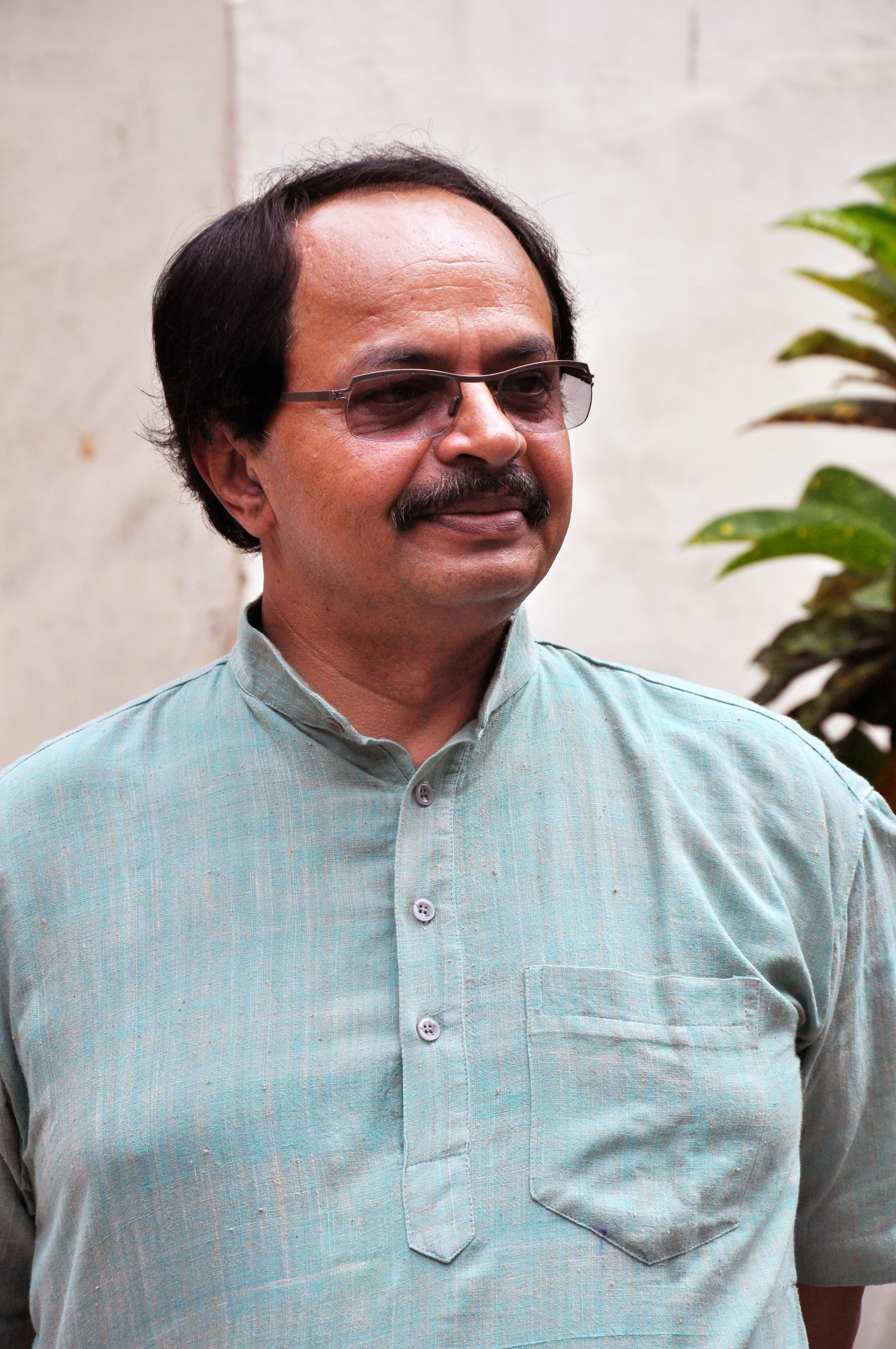
Nagathihalli Chandrasekhar

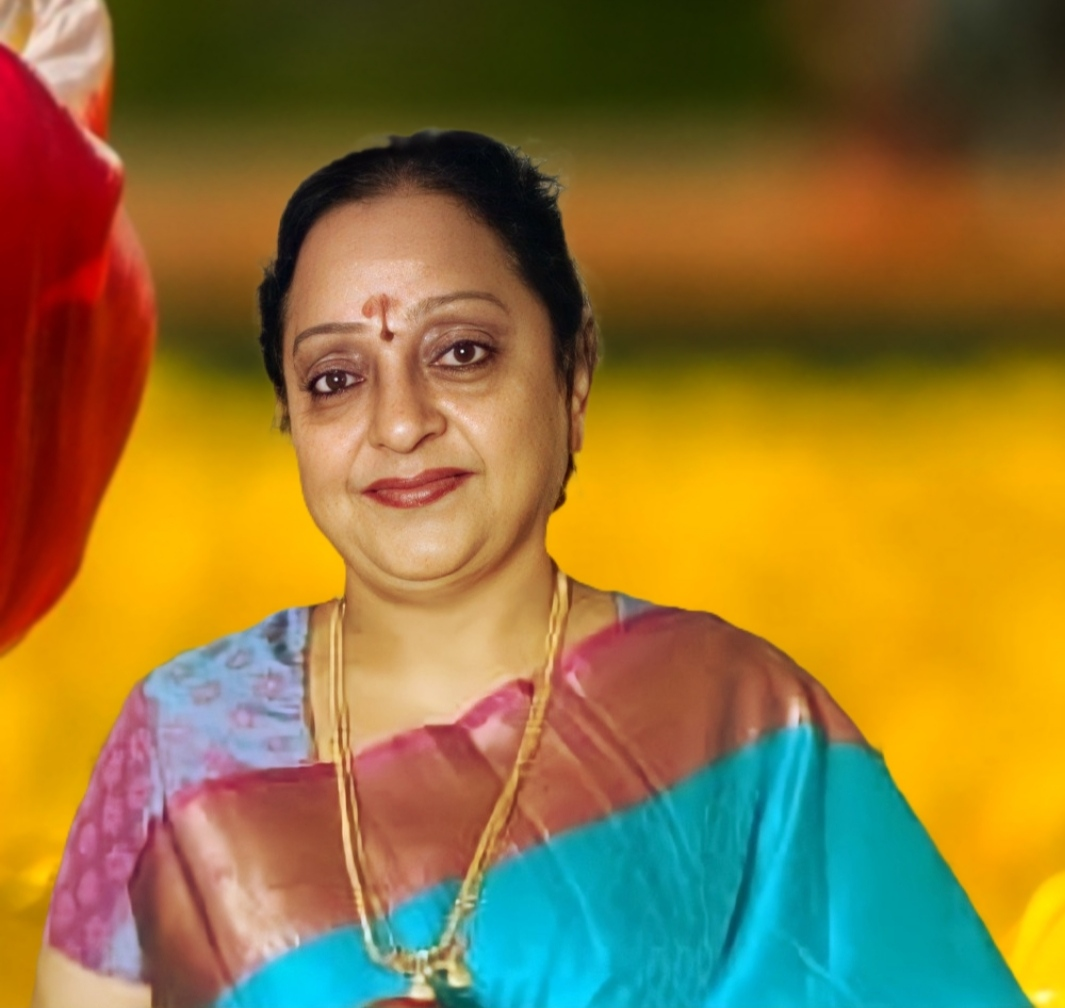
Manjula Gururaj

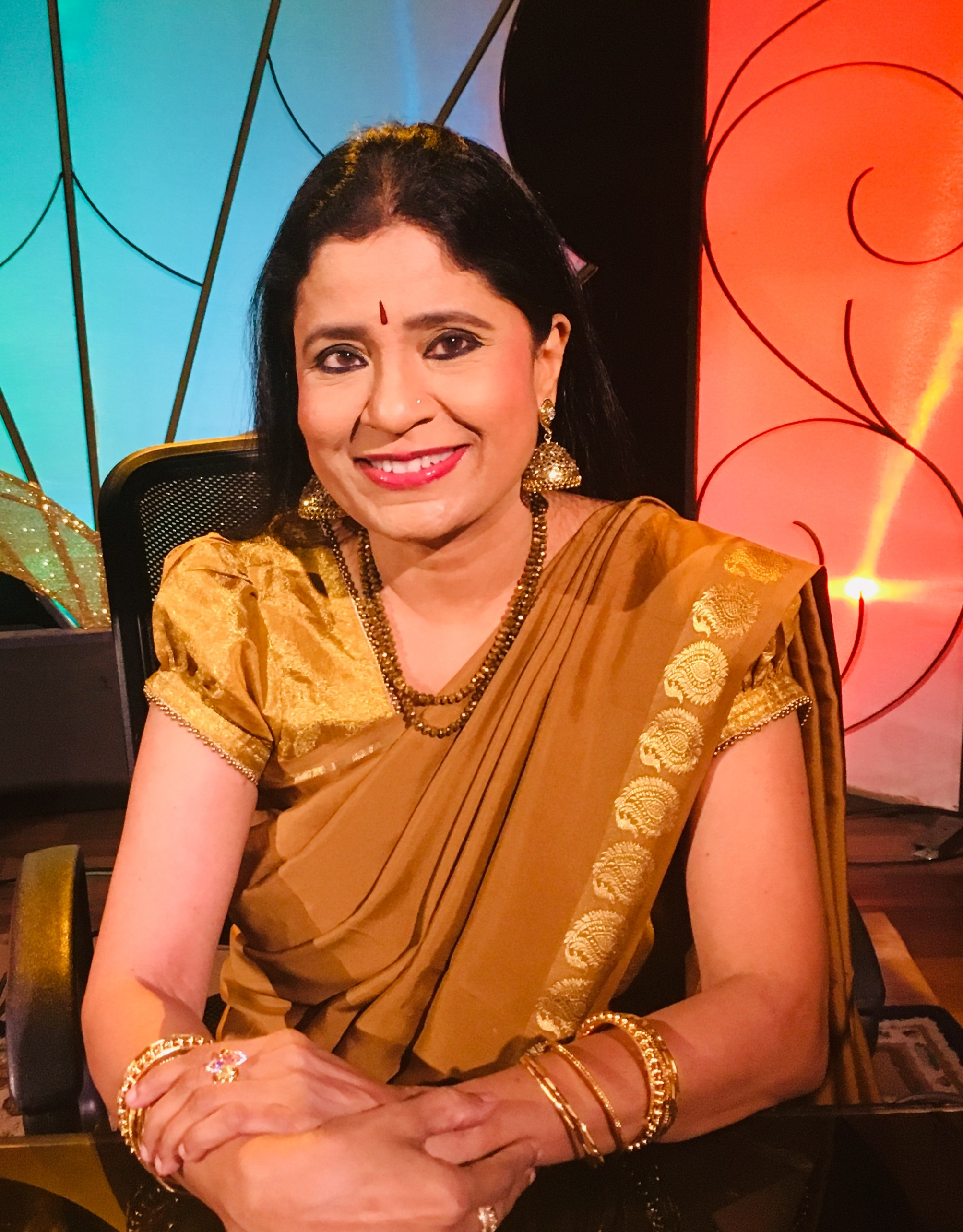
B. R. Chaya

Recipient	Field
K. Ullas Karanth	Environment
B. M. Kumaraswamy	Environment
Ayyappa Masagi	Agriculture
Hanumantappa Siddappa Karagi	Agriculture
C. R. Soragavi	Agriculture
Ashwini Akkunji	Sports
Ashwini Ponnappa	Sports
Vikas Gowda	Sports
K. R. Shankar Iyer	Sports
Shivanand Hombala	Sports
Kallappa Ramappa Picheli	Sports
H. R. Gopalakrishna	Sports
B. Shantarama Shetty	Sports
Prameela Ayyappa	Sports
Gopal Kharvi	Sports
K. V. Narayana	Literature
O. L. Nagabhushana Swamy	Literature
B. R. Lakshman Rao	Literature
Lata Rajashekhar	Literature
Siddhaling Pattanshetti	Literature
Neelagiri Thalawar	Literature
Veena Shanteshwar	Literature
Durgadas	Literature
D. A. Shankar	Literature
Srinivas Vaidya	Literature
B. R. Chaya	Music
Lahari Velu	Music
Chandrika Gururaj	Music
Shantappa Mallappa Hadapad	Music
Manjula Gururaj	Music
Hunasawadi Rajan	Media
Mahendra Mishra	Media
Gangadhar Modaliar	Media
Thimmappa Bhat	Media
Thyagaraj	Media
B. Samiulla	Media
Nahid Ataulla	Media
S. Rajendran	Media
Somashekhar Kavachur	Media
Hamid Palya	Media
Arun	Media
Manoj Patil	Media
A. Surya Prakash	Media
R. T. Majjigi	Media
Neena Gopal	Media
Ganapathi Honnanayak	Freedom Struggle
A. C. Madegowda	Freedom Struggle
Kris Gopalakrishnan	Others
S. Shadakshari	Others
Arun Raman	Others
Sudhakar Pai	Others
Snake Shyam	Others
Babu Krishnamurthy	Others
Sudha Baraguru	Others
H. M. Veerabhadra Swamy	Others
T. M. Revanasiddaiah Shastry	Others
Vyjayanthi Kashi	Dance
Jilan Basha	Dance
Sujata Rajgopal	Dance
Sridhar Iyengar	Overseas Kannadiga
M. B. Nalavadi	Overseas Kannadiga
Eshwar Bidari	Overseas Kannadiga
Agrahara Krishnamurthy	Overseas Kannadiga
Manohar M. Kori	Overseas Kannadiga
N. Kumaraswamy	Overseas Kannadiga
G. T. Krishnamurthy	Overseas Kannadiga
R. K. Renu	Overseas Kannadiga
Siddalingeshwara Orekondi	Overseas Kannadiga
Sangamesh Saundattimath	Research
A. V. Narasimhamurthy	Research
M. S. Umesh	Theatre
Yashwant Sardeshpande	Theatre
Kamalavva Ramappa Janappagol	Theatre
Shivanagowda Koti	Theatre
S. Panchakshari	Theatre
Geetha Rani	Theatre
Rangaiah	Theatre
Ashok Basti	Theatre
Mylarappa bin Mallaiah	Theatre
Devadas Kapikad	Theatre
N. S. Rajaram	Science
S. Chinnaswamy Mamballi	Administration
Sudhakar Rao	Administration
Narayanappa Seenappa Chitragara	Painting
M. S. Murthy	Painting
V. B. Hiregowdar	Painting
Ashok Gudigar	Painting
Naganna Badiger	Painting
A. S. Patil	Painting
Jambukeshwara	Painting
S. P. Nagendra	Painting
Ballekere Hanumanthappa bin Kenchappa	Education
Ananthakumara Swamiji	Education
Jayaprakasha Gowda	Education
Ramesh Agadi	Education
Shivarudra Kallolkar	Education
H. T. Rathod	Education
S. B. Ranganath	Education
M. K. Sridhar	Education
K. V. Gupta	Cinema
Devi	Cinema
Nagathihalli Chandrashekhar	Cinema
Ramesh Bhat	Cinema
Nagaraj Kote	Cinema
M. Veerappa	Music
Veerabhadrappa Shivappa Gadagi	Music
Kaivalya Kumar Gurava	Music
Shakthi Patil	Music
Ningappa Dangi	Music
R. Shivanna	Cultural Organization
Rajendra Singh	Cinema
S. V. Shivakumar	Cinema
Ravikiran	Cinema
Suneel Puranik	Cinema
N. Ramanuja	Social Work
Channamma Hallikeri	Social Work
Shivahalli	Social Work
M. C. Pankaja	Social Work
Nagamma Keshavamurthy	Social Work
Father Ambrose Pinto	Social Work
Blood Kumar	Social Work
H. R. Nagarajachar	Social Work
S. N. Murthy	Social Work
P. Dayanand Pai	Social Work
M. G. R. Urs	Cultural Organization
G. M. Hegde	Cultural Organization
Chandraiah Naidu	Cultural Organization
Maskeri M. K. Nayak	Cultural Organization
Sutram Satyanarayana Shastry	Cultural Organization
Sarvottam Pai	Cultural Organization
Renukappa	Cultural Organization
Sriram Ittannanavar	Folklore
B. R. Police Patil	Folklore
Yugadharma Ramanna	Folklore
G. V. Dasegowda	Folklore
G. P. Jagadeesh	Folklore
Maleyur Guruswamy	Folklore
Manjavva Jogathi	Folklore
Bovi Jayamma Thimmaiah	Folklore
Sambanna Puravanthar	Folklore
Malabai Santrama Sambrekar	Folklore
Nebbur Narayan Hegde	Yakshagana
Bhaskar Kogga Kamat	Yakshagana
K. V. Ramesh	Yakshagana
Balipa Narayana Bhagavat	Yakshagana
K. Gopalakrishna Bhagavat	Yakshagana
Gopalakrishna	Yakshagana
N. L. Nayak	Medicine
K. M. Mahendranath	Medicine
C. R. Chandrashekhar	Medicine
R. P. Nerli	Medicine
Basavaraj H. Kerudi	Medicine
Mithra Hegde	Medicine
Padmini Prasad	Medicine
John Ebnezar	Medicine
Y. Rudrappa	Medicine
Giridhar Kaje	Medicine
M. G. Krishnamurthy	Medicine
Bhujanga Shetty	Medicine
Mysore Udyana Kalasangha	Institution
Satish M. Nayak (Mogaveera Yuva Sanghatane)	Institution
H. R. Nagendra (Vivekananda Yoga Kendra)	Institution
R. K. Shetty	Overseas Kannadiga
Malliksaab Dabalasaab Hanagandi	Theatre
Balakrishna Guruji	Others
M. B. Puranik	Others
N. Krishnamurthy Rao	Social Work
D. G. Lakshman	Media
M. S. Shakuntala	Dance
Basti Vaman Shenoy	Literature
Sanjeev Suvarna	Yakshagana
Ramachandrappa Arkasali	Freedom Struggle
Vidyakar (Udavam Karangal)	Institution
B. J. Nagaraju	Sports
Rebecca Jose	Sports
H. M. Jyothi	Sports
Sudhir	Sports
Kavita Yadav	Sports
Kashinath Nayak	Sports
Bharat Chettri	Sports
Dhananjay Madhik	Sports
V. Ravichandran	Cinema
