= Al-Mansur (disambiguation) =

Al-Mansur المنصور
- Gender: Male

Origin
- Origin: Semitic (Arabic)
- Meaning: Victorious
- Region of origin: Arabia (Middle East)

Al-Mansur, an Arabic surname meaning the Victorious, may also refer to:

== People ==
- Al-Mansur (714–775) was the second Abbasid caliph of Arab caliphate, ruling from 754 until his death in 775
- Mansur ibn Yazid ibn Mansur al-Himyari (r. 779), Abbasid official and provincial governor
- Mansur ibn al-Mahdi, the son of Abbasid caliph al-Mahdi (r. 775–785)
- Al-Mansur bi-Nasr Allah (913–953), ruler and Ismaili Shia Imam of the Fatimids in Ifriqiya
- Al-Mansur ibn Buluggin (d. 995), second ruler of the Zirids in Ifriqiya
- Al-Rashid Billah (1109–1138), also known as Mansur, the Caliph of Baghdad during later Abbasid era
- Al-Mustansir I (d. 1242), also known as Mansur, was the penultimate caliph of Baghdad
- Al-Mansur Ibn Abi Aamir or Almanzor (c. 938–1002), de facto ruler of Muslim Al-Andalus
- Mansur ibn Nasir (d. 1104), Hammadid ruler
- Abu Yusuf Yaqub al-Mansur (c. 1160–1199), third Almohad ruler
- Abu Yusuf Yaqub ibn Abd Al-Haqq or Al Mansur Al Marini (1212–1286), founder of Marinid dynasty
- Al-Mansur of Tidore (c. 1475–1526), second sultan of Tidore, Maluku
- Ahmad al-Mansur (1549–1603), sultan of the Saadi dynasty

== Other uses ==
- Mansour district, a district in Baghdad, Iraq
  - Mansour neighbourhood
- Al Mansoura (Doha), a district in Qatar, located in the municipality of Ad Dawhah
- Mansoura, Egypt, a city in Arab Republic of Egypt
- Mansura, Sindh, or Brahmanabad, the historic capital of the Muslim Caliphate in Sindh, Pakistan

== See also ==
- Almansor, an 1821 play by German poet and playwright Heinrich Heine
- Mansour (disambiguation)
- Mansur (disambiguation)
