= Dharwad Assembly constituency =

Legislative Assembly constituency in Karnataka State, India

Coordinates: 15.46°N 74.99°E

Dharwad
- Constituency No. 71 for the Karnataka Legislative Assembly

Constituency details
- Country: India
- Region: South India
- State: Karnataka
- District: Dharwad
- Lok Sabha constituency: Dharwad
- Established: 1951
- Total electors: 214,132
- Reservation: None

Member of Legislative Assembly
- 16th Karnataka Legislative Assembly
- Incumbent Vacant

Dharwad Assembly constituency is one of the 224 Legislative Assembly constituencies of Karnataka in India.

It is part of Dharwad district.

== Members of the Legislative Assembly ==
Election	Member	Party
1952	Hasansab Maktumsab Dasanakop	Indian National Congress
1952 By-election	D. B. Ayyappa	Independent politician
1957	Inamati Mallappa Basappa	Indian National Congress
1962	Hasansab Maktumsab Dasankop	Indian National Congress
1963 By-election (Note: Died on 17/09/1963)	S. V. P. Agnihotri	Indian National Congress
1967	D. K. Mahaboobsab	Indian National Congress
1972	D. K. Naikar	Indian National Congress
1978	Bhavurao Deshpande	Janata Party
1983	Morey. S. R	Indian National Congress
1985	Chandrakant Bellad	Independent politician
1989	Morey. S. R	Indian National Congress
1994	Chandrakant Bellad	Bharatiya Janata Party
1999	Chandrakant Bellad	Bharatiya Janata Party
2004	Morey. S. R	Indian National Congress
2008	Seema Ashok Masuti	Bharatiya Janata Party
2013	Vinay Kulkarni	Indian National Congress
2018	Amrut Desai	Bharatiya Janata Party
2023	Vinay Kulkarni	Indian National Congress
2026^		

== Election results ==
=== 2026 By-poll ===
2026 By-poll election: Dharwad
Party	Candidate	Votes	%	±%
INC				
BJP				
JD(S)				
Majority				
Turnout				
gain from		Swing		

=== Assembly Election 2023 ===
2023 Karnataka Legislative Assembly election : Dharwad
Party	Candidate	Votes	%	±%
INC	Vinay Kulkarni	89,333	53.92	▲12.29
BJP	Amrut Desai	71,296	43.04	▼11.66
NOTA	None of the above	1,521	0.92	▼0.34
Margin of victory		18,037	10.89	▼2.18
Turnout		165,786	77.42	▲2.23
Total valid votes		165,663		
Registered electors		214,132		▲3.43
INC gain from BJP		Swing	▼0.78	

=== Assembly Election 2018 ===
2018 Karnataka Legislative Assembly election : Dharwad
Party	Candidate	Votes	%	±%
BJP	Amrut Desai	85,123	54.70	▲39.21
INC	Vinay Kulkarni	64,783	41.63	▼7.37
NOTA	None of the above	1,967	1.26	New
JD(S)	Tirakappa Sadeppa Jamanal (Shrikant)	1,263	0.81	▼31.39
Margin of victory		20,340	13.07	▼3.72
Turnout		155,654	75.19	▲2.51
Total valid votes		155,630		
Registered electors		207,025		▲12.78
BJP gain from INC		Swing	▲5.70	

=== Assembly Election 2013 ===
2013 Karnataka Legislative Assembly election : Dharwad
Party	Candidate	Votes	%	±%
INC	Vinay Kulkarni	53,453	49.00	▲17.90
JD(S)	Amrut Desai	35,133	32.20	▲13.10
KJP	Ashtagi Tavanappa Payappa	21,589	19.79	New
BJP	Seema Masuti	16,896	15.49	▼16.26
Independent	Somappa Basappa Benakatti	2,162	1.98	New
NCP	Basavaraj Budihal	811	0.74	New
Margin of victory		18,320	16.79	▲16.14
Turnout		133,415	72.68	▲5.36
Total valid votes		109,094		
Registered electors		183,561		▲10.76
INC gain from BJP		Swing	▲17.25	

=== Assembly Election 2008 ===
2008 Karnataka Legislative Assembly election : Dharwad
Party	Candidate	Votes	%	±%
BJP	Seema Masuti	35,417	31.75	▼1.38
INC	Vinay Kulkarni	34,694	31.10	▼7.09
JD(S)	Amrut Desai	21,302	19.10	▲15.26
Independent	Ashtagi Tavanappa Payappa	6,113	5.48	New
Independent	Ramanagoudar Sangangouda Rudragouda	2,789	2.50	New
Independent	Ishwar Sanikoppa	2,178	1.95	New
Independent	Bellad Shivanna	2,075	1.86	New
Independent	Desai Subhas Ningappa	1,710	1.53	New
Independent	Ambadgatti Shivanand Rudrappa	1,422	1.27	New
Margin of victory		723	0.65	▼4.42
Turnout		111,562	67.32	▲7.41
Total valid votes		111,549		
Registered electors		165,725		▼12.57
BJP gain from INC		Swing	▼6.44	

=== Assembly Election 2004 ===
2004 Karnataka Legislative Assembly election : Dharwad
Party	Candidate	Votes	%	±%
INC	Morey. S. R	43,334	38.19	▼8.00
BJP	Chandrakant Bellad	37,584	33.13	▼14.04
Independent	Agadi Basaveshwar (Babanna) Murasavirappa	13,490	11.89	New
Kannada Nadu Party	Adiveppa Basavaraj Masur	6,774	5.97	New
JD(S)	Gururaj Hunasimarad	4,359	3.84	▼2.15
JP	Kiran Basanna Sambrani	2,341	2.06	New
SP	Sunkad. S. T	1,378	1.21	New
Independent	Pandurang Bhimarao Laxmeshwar	1,065	0.94	New
Independent	Hajaratabi Anwarsab Mirji	1,015	0.89	New
Margin of victory		5,750	5.07	▲4.09
Turnout		113,566	59.91	▼1.21
Total valid votes		113,461		
Registered electors		189,559		▲12.02
INC gain from BJP		Swing	▼8.98	

=== Assembly Election 1999 ===
1999 Karnataka Legislative Assembly election : Dharwad
Party	Candidate	Votes	%	±%
BJP	Chandrakant Bellad	47,638	47.17	▲14.17
INC	Morey. S. R	46,650	46.19	▲24.98
JD(S)	Javali Iqbal Anjum Magdum Husein	6,051	5.99	New
Margin of victory		988	0.98	▼10.81
Turnout		103,420	61.12	▲7.22
Total valid votes		100,995		
Rejected ballots		2,369	2.29	▲0.31
Registered electors		169,217		▲10.61
BJP hold		Swing	▲14.17	

=== Assembly Election 1994 ===
1994 Karnataka Legislative Assembly election : Dharwad
Party	Candidate	Votes	%	±%
BJP	Chandrakant Bellad	26,630	33.00	▲13.86
INC	Mahadev Horatti	17,114	21.21	▼26.86
JD	Ravi Siriyannavar	15,533	19.25	▼0.09
INC	Dambal. H. V	10,715	13.28	New
Independent	R. K. Shankar	3,489	4.32	New
Independent	Javali Iqbal Anjum Magdum Husein	3,317	4.11	New
KRRS	Topangouda Rudragouda Patil	1,082	1.34	New
Margin of victory		9,516	11.79	▼16.94
Turnout		82,463	53.90	▼5.11
Total valid votes		80,694		
Rejected ballots		1,635	1.98	▼3.16
Registered electors		152,984		▲12.38
BJP gain from INC		Swing	▼15.07	

=== Assembly Election 1989 ===
1989 Karnataka Legislative Assembly election : Dharwad
Party	Candidate	Votes	%	±%
INC	Morey. S. R	36,627	48.07	▲25.05
JD	Gangadhar Padaki	14,736	19.34	New
BJP	Aminagad Chandrashekhar Shivalingappa	14,584	19.14	▲5.86
Kranti Sabha	Mallanagouda Chanabasagouda Patil	3,210	4.21	New
AIML	Inamadar. M. S	2,648	3.48	New
JP	Suresh Kedareppa Gumaste	1,109	1.46	New
Independent	Veeranna Desai	640	0.84	New
Margin of victory		21,891	28.73	▲26.71
Turnout		80,328	59.01	▲0.17
Total valid votes		76,196		
Rejected ballots		4,132	5.14	▲3.10
Registered electors		136,129		▲23.18
INC gain from Independent		Swing	▲23.03	

=== Assembly Election 1985 ===
1985 Karnataka Legislative Assembly election : Dharwad
Party	Candidate	Votes	%	±%
Independent	Chandrakant Bellad	15,949	25.04	New
INC	Charantimath Leelavati Rajashekharaiah	14,662	23.02	▼8.19
JP	Gangadhar Padaki	14,397	22.60	▼8.38
Independent	Abdulgani Ibrahimsaheb Maniyar	9,009	14.14	New
BJP	Gounkar Tukaram Laxaman	8,461	13.28	▼3.83
Margin of victory		1,287	2.02	▲1.79
Turnout		65,024	58.84	▼8.89
Total valid votes		63,699		
Rejected ballots		1,325	2.04	▼0.64
Registered electors		110,510		▲26.37
Independent gain from INC		Swing	▼6.17	

=== Assembly Election 1983 ===
1983 Karnataka Legislative Assembly election : Dharwad
Party	Candidate	Votes	%	±%
INC	Morey. S. R	17,991	31.21	▲29.75
JP	Chandrakant Bellad	17,859	30.98	▼20.91
BJP	Bhavurao Deshpande	9,864	17.11	New
Independent	Maniyar Abdulgani Ir-brahimasaheb	8,513	14.77	New
LKD	Hedge. G. S. Vakilaru	1,064	1.85	New
Independent	B. V. Rama Rao	490	0.85	New
Independent	Palanakar Mahabaleshwar Ramachandra	416	0.72	New
Margin of victory		132	0.23	▼7.97
Turnout		59,230	67.73	▼4.38
Total valid votes		57,641		
Rejected ballots		1,589	2.68	▼0.03
Registered electors		87,450		▲15.64
INC gain from JP		Swing	▼20.68	

=== Assembly Election 1978 ===
1978 Karnataka Legislative Assembly election : Dharwad
Party	Candidate	Votes	%	±%
JP	Bhavurao Deshpande	27,530	51.89	New
INC(I)	D. K. Naikar	23,182	43.70	New
Independent	Jamadar Abdulsattar Mohammadgous	1,246	2.35	New
INC	Shibargatti Gousmodin Rajesab	777	1.46	▼50.16
Margin of victory		4,348	8.20	▼15.42
Turnout		54,529	72.11	▲6.29
Total valid votes		53,052		
Rejected ballots		1,477	2.71	▲2.71
Registered electors		75,621		▲33.43
JP gain from INC		Swing	▲0.27	

=== Assembly Election 1972 ===
1972 Mysore State Legislative Assembly election : Dharwad
Party	Candidate	Votes	%	±%
INC	D. K. Naikar	18,653	51.62	▼2.36
ABJS	P. Y. Shankaragouda	10,117	28.00	▼13.52
INC(O)	M. H. Channappa	6,685	18.50	New
SWA	T. C. Patil	677	1.87	New
Margin of victory		8,536	23.62	▲11.15
Turnout		37,301	65.82	▲4.13
Total valid votes		36,132		
Registered electors		56,674		▲17.78
INC hold		Swing	▼2.36	

=== Assembly Election 1967 ===
1967 Mysore State Legislative Assembly election : Dharwad
Party	Candidate	Votes	%	±%
INC	D. K. Mahaboobsab	15,325	53.98	▲2.20
ABJS	S. B. Y. Laxman	11,786	41.52	New
Independent	V. K. Javali	1,277	4.50	New
Margin of victory		3,539	12.47	▼12.16
Turnout		29,684	61.69	
Total valid votes		28,388		
Registered electors		48,117		
INC hold		Swing	▲2.20	

=== Assembly By-election 1963 ===
1963 Mysore State Legislative Assembly by-election : Dharwad
Party	Candidate	Votes	%	±%
INC	S. V. P. Agnihotri	12,859	51.78	▼16.87
Independent	S. S. Shettar	6,742	27.15	New
Independent	A. A. Mangalgatti	3,480	14.01	New
Independent	N. B. Pujar	1,755	7.07	New
Margin of victory		6,117	24.63	▼23.20
Total valid votes		24,836		
INC hold		Swing	▼16.87	

=== Assembly Election 1962 ===
1962 Mysore State Legislative Assembly election : Dharwad
Party	Candidate	Votes	%	±%
INC	Hasansab Maktumsab Dasankop	17,092	68.65	▲20.81
ABJS	Yellappagouda Shankergouda Patil	5,185	20.83	New
Independent	Chandrashekhar Marigouda Shivangouder	2,208	8.87	New
Independent	Rayappa Channappa Alagwadi	412	1.65	New
Margin of victory		11,907	47.83	▲41.63
Turnout		26,317	55.16	▼5.68
Total valid votes		24,897		
Registered electors		47,714		▲4.29
INC hold		Swing	▲20.81	

=== Assembly Election 1957 ===
1957 Mysore State Legislative Assembly election : Dharwad
Party	Candidate	Votes	%	±%
INC	Inamati Mallappa Basappa	13,317	47.84	▲10.50
Independent	Desai Basavaraj Ayyappa	11,590	41.64	New
ABJS	Patil Yellappagouda Shankaragouda	2,388	8.58	New
Independent	Hurali Gadigeppa Shivappa	541	1.94	New
Margin of victory		1,727	6.20	▼18.09
Turnout		27,836	60.84	
Total valid votes		27,836		
Registered electors		45,752		
INC gain from Independent		Swing	▼13.79	

=== Assembly By-election 1952 ===
1952 Bombay State Legislative Assembly by-election : Dharwad
Party	Candidate	Votes	%	±%
Independent	D. B. Ayyappa	13,462	61.63	New
INC	M. L. K. Vyankatesh	8,156	37.34	▼14.59
Independent	D. K. Mahabubsab	225	1.03	New
Margin of victory		5,306	24.29	▲16.98
Total valid votes		21,843		
Independent gain from INC		Swing	▲9.70	

=== Assembly Election 1952 ===
1952 Bombay State Legislative Assembly election : Dharwad
Party	Candidate	Votes	%	±%
INC	Hasansab Maktumsab Dasanakop	15,210	51.93	New
KMPP	Basawaraj Ayyappa Desai	13,068	44.61	New
Socialist Party (India)	Kurtakoti Shankar Lingo	1,013	3.46	New
Margin of victory		2,142	7.31	
Turnout		29,291	61.49	
Total valid votes		29,291		
Registered electors		47,638		
INC win (new seat)				

== See also ==
- List of constituencies of the Karnataka Legislative Assembly
- Dharwad district
