= Mallikarjun Mansur =

Indian singer (1910-1992)

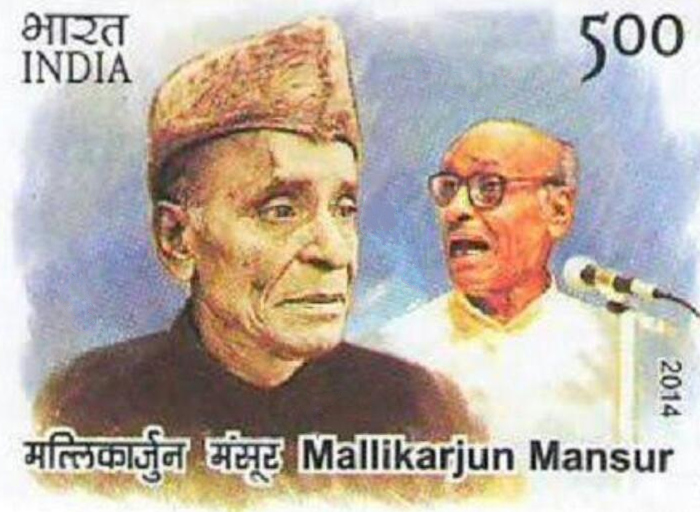
- Mansur on a 2014 stamp of India

Background information
- Born: Mallikarjun Bheemrayappa Mansur; 31 December 1910; Mansur, Bombay Presidency, British India (in present-day Dharwad, Karnataka, India)
- Died: 12 September 1992 (aged 81) Dharwad, Karnataka, India
- Genre: Hindustani classical music
- Occupation: Vocalist music performer
- Years active: 1928 – 1992
- Labels: His Master's Voice, Music Today, Inreco

Pandit Mallikarjun Bheemaraayappa Mansur (31 December 1910 – 12 September 1992) was a Hindustani classical singer from Karnataka. He sang in the khyal genre and belonged to the Jaipur-Atrauli gharana.

== Early life and background ==
Mallikarjun was born on 31 December 1910, at Mansur, a village five kilometres west of Dharwad, Karnataka. According to his biography, he was born on an Amavasya day. His father, Bheemaraayappa, was the village headman, a farmer by occupation and an ardent lover and patron of music. He had four brothers and three sisters. His elder brother Basavaraj owned a theatre troupe, and thus at age nine Mallikarjun did a small role in a play.

Spotting the talent in his son, Mallikarjun's father engaged him to a travelling Yakshagana (Kannada theatre) troupe. The owner of this troupe took a liking to the tender and melodious voice of Mallikarjun and encouraged him to sing different types of compositions during the drama performances. Hearing one such performance, he was picked up by Appaya Swamy under whom he had his initial training in Carnatic music. Sometime later, he was introduced to Hindustani music under Nilkanth Bua Alurmath of Miraj who belonged to the Gwalior gharana. The latter brought him to Alladiya Khan (1855–1946), the stalwart and the then patriarch of the Jaipur-Atrauli gharana, in the late 1920s, who referred him to his elder son, Manji Khan. Following Manji Khan's untimely death, he came under the tutelage of Manji Khan's younger brother Bhurji Khan. The grooming under Bhurji Khan had the most important influence on his style of singing.

== Career ==
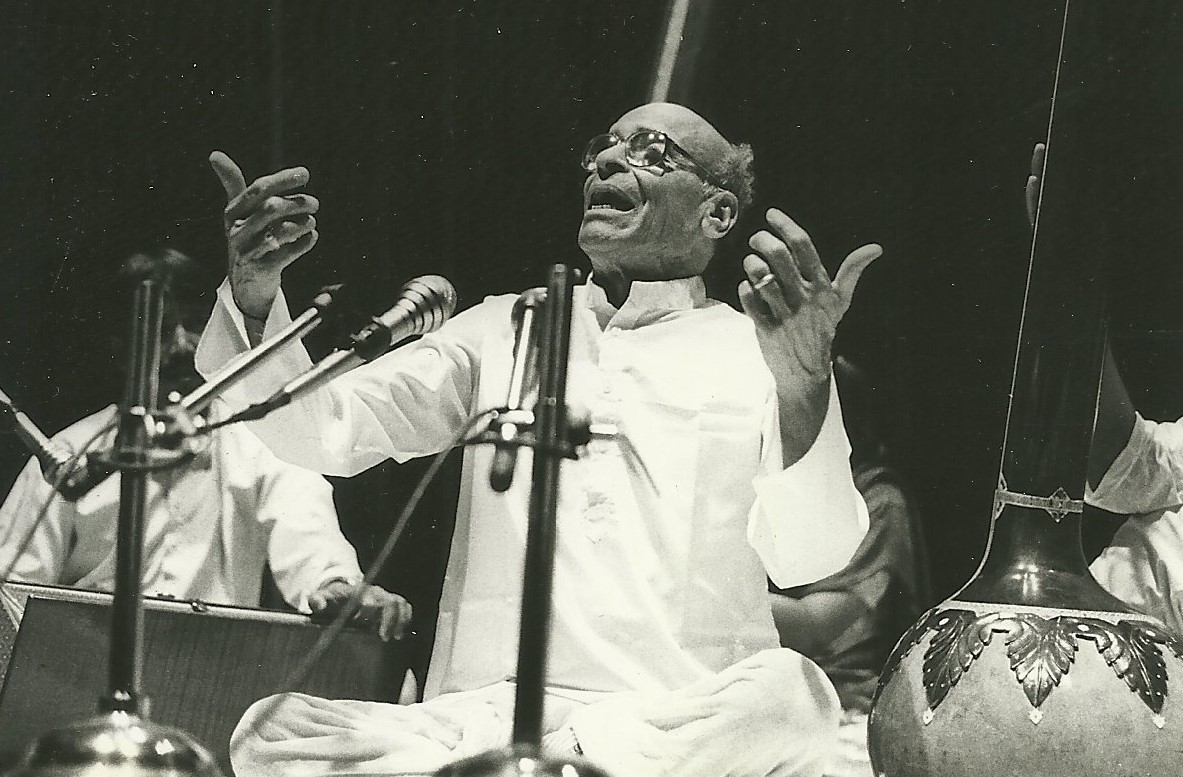
Mallikarjun Mansur at a concert

Mansur was well known for his command over a large number of rare (aprachalit) ragas such as Shuddh Nat, Asa Jogiya, Hem Nat, Lachchhasakh, Khat, Shivmat Bhairav, Kabir Bhairav, Bihari, Sampoorna Malkauns, Lajawanti, Adambari Kedar, Ek Nishad Bihagda and Bahaduri Todi, as well as his constant, mercurial improvisations in both melody and metre without ever losing the emotional content of the song. Initially, his voice and style resembled that of Manji Khan and Narayanrao Vyas, but gradually he developed his own style of rendition.

He also remained music director with His Master's Voice and later music advisor to All India Radio's Dharwad station.

== Awards ==
He received all three of India's national Padma Awards:

- Padma Shri Award by the Government of India in 1970
- Padma Bhushan Award by the Government of India in 1976.
- Padma Vibhushan, the second highest civilian honour given Government of India in 1992.
- In 1982, he was awarded the Sangeet Natak Akademi Fellowship, the highest honour conferred by the Sangeet Natak Akademi, India's National Academy of Music, Dance & Drama.
- Kalidas Samman Award by the Government of Madhya Pradesh.

== Books ==
Mansur wrote an autobiographical book in his mother tongue Kannada, titled Nanna Rasayatre (Kannada: ನನ್ನ ರಸಯಾತ್ರೆ) in Kannada, which has been translated into English as a book titled My Journey in Music by his son, Rajshekhar Mansur.

== Personal life ==
Mansur was married to Gangamma. He had seven daughters and a son, Rajashekhar Mansur. Amongst Mansur's children, Rajashekhar and Neela Kodli are vocalists.

Mansur recovered from an illness after being in coma for two weeks in April 1992. On 12 September that year, he died after he developed breathing complications due to lung cancer, in Dharwad. He was given a state funeral.

== Legacy ==
The residence of Mallikarjun Mansur, Mrutyunjaya, today houses a museum in his memory. The museum is managed by Dr. Mallikarjun Mansur National Memorial Trust functioning under the Department of Kannada and Culture, State Government of Karnataka. Every year the Trust organises a National Concert on 12 and 13 September to commemorate his death anniversary, with artists from his legacy performing in the morning at the museum and invited artists performing later in the evening. The Trust annually announces three awards on 31 December to commemorate his birth anniversary.

Indian documentary film director Nandan Kudhyadi made Rasayatra about the musician in 1994, it won the National Film Awards for Best Non-Feature Film, Best Non-Feature Film Cinematography, and Best Non-Feature Film Editing.

To mark his birth centenary, a three-day music festival was organised in Dharwad and Hubli from 1 to 3 January 2011, wherein singers from across India performed and performances were held at the Kariyamma Devi temple premises at his birthplace Mansur village. His ancestral home in Mansur was also converted into a memorial.

In 2013, a five audio CD collection, "Akashvani Sangeet" of his music including rare "Vachana Gayana" renditions, was released by All India Radio archives at a ceremony held at Srijana Rangamandir at the Karnatak College Dharwar campus.

In September 2014, a postage stamp featuring Mansur was released by India Post commemorating his contributions to music.

== Bibliography ==
- Sadānanda Kanavaḷḷi (1992). Mallikarjun Mansur. Prasaranga, Karnatak University.
