= Amrut Desai =

Indian politician

Member of Karnataka Legislative Assembly
- In office 2018–2023
- Preceded by: Vinay Kulkarni
- Constituency: Dharwad

Personal details
- Born: 20 June 1977 (age 48) Hubli, Karnataka
- Party: Bharatiya Janata Party
- Spouse: Priya
- Children: 2 daughters
- Parent: Ayyappa Desai (father)
- Education: Bachelor of Commerce

Amrut Desai (born 20 June 1977) is an Indian politician. He is a Member of Legislative Assembly of Karnataka, representing Dharwad Assembly constituency since May 2018. He is associated with the Bharatiya Janata Party.
