= Dharwad Rural Assembly constituency =

Former Assembly constituency in Karnataka, India

Coordinates: 15.471851°N 74.992858°E

Dharwad Rural
- Former constituency No. 174 for the Karnataka Legislative Assembly

Constituency details
- Country: India
- Region: South India
- State: Karnataka
- Division: Mysore
- District: Dharwad
- Lok Sabha constituency: Dharwad
- Established: 1967
- Abolished: 2008
- Reservation: None

Dharwad Rural Assembly constituency was one of the constituencies in Karnataka state assembly in India until 2008 when it was made defunct. It was part of Dharwad Lok Sabha constituency.

== Members of the Legislative Assembly ==
Election	Member	Party
1967	A. S. Vishwanathaprasad	Indian National Congress
1972	Sumati Balachandra Madiman	Indian National Congress
1978	Sumati Balachandra Madiman	Indian National Congress
1981 By-election (Note: Died on 21 December 1980)	Pudakalakatti Channabasappa Virupaxappa	Indian National Congress
1983	Pudakalakatti Channabasappa Virupaxappa	Indian National Congress
1985	Desai Ayyappa Basavaraj	Janata Party
1989	Babagouda Rudragouda Patil	Kranti Sabha
1994	Ambadagatti Shrikant Rudrappa	Indian National Congress
1998 By-election (Note: Died on 23/06/1997)	Ambadagatti Shrikant Rudrappa	Indian National Congress
1999	Ambadagatti Shivananda Rudrappa	Independent politician
2004	Vinay Kulkarni	Independent politician

== Election results ==
=== Assembly Election 2004 ===
2004 Karnataka Legislative Assembly election : Dharwad Rural
Party	Candidate	Votes	%	±%
Independent	Vinay Kulkarni	33,744	32.38%	New
JD(U)	Desai Ayyappa Basavaraj	30,514	29.28%	▲28.17
INC	Ambadagatti Shivananda Rudrappa	19,342	18.56%	▼7.07
Independent	Ilyas Ahmad Siraj Ahmed Mulla	7,203	6.91%	New
JD(S)	Shivananda Holehadagali	6,357	6.10%	▲0.10
JP	Sangamesh Channabasappa Hampannavar	1,900	1.82%	New
Kannada Nadu Party	Malimath Parvatidevi Chandrashekarswamy	1,362	1.31%	New
Independent	Ramesh K. Malledi	1,355	1.30%	New
Independent	Mangaji Sumitra Somaning	1,291	1.24%	New
Margin of victory		3,230	3.10%	▼0.23
Turnout		104,238	71.97%	▲0.48
Total valid votes		104,206		
Registered electors		144,829		▲9.48
Independent hold		Swing	▼2.50	

=== Assembly Election 1999 ===
1999 Karnataka Legislative Assembly election : Dharwad Rural
Party	Candidate	Votes	%	±%
Independent	Ambadagatti Shivananda Rudrappa	30,375	34.88%	New
BJP	Shivanand Shivagoud Holehadagali	27,473	31.54%	▲8.76
INC	Lohit D. Naikar	22,325	25.63%	▼10.13
JD(S)	Parameshwar Siddalingappa Dandin	5,229	6.00%	New
JD(U)	Nadaf Hussain Sab Dasthagirsab	967	1.11%	New
Margin of victory		2,902	3.33%	▲0.55
Turnout		94,568	71.49%	▼1.86
Total valid votes		87,095		
Rejected ballots		7,407	7.83%	▲1.73
Registered electors		132,289		▲2.17
Independent gain from INC		Swing	▼0.88	

=== Assembly By-election 1998 ===
1998 Karnataka Legislative Assembly by-election : Dharwad Rural
Party	Candidate	Votes	%	±%
INC	Ambadagatti. S. R	31,884	35.76%	▲5.57
JD	A. B. Desai	29,406	32.98%	▲6.70
BJP	S. S. Holehadagali	20,309	22.78%	▲8.96
KRRS	Narendra. K. B	5,480	6.15%	▼18.00
Karnataka Vikas Party	K. D. Haveripeth	1,099	1.23%	New
Independent	B. G. Dandagi	636	0.71%	New
Margin of victory		2,478	2.78%	▼1.13
Turnout		94,976	73.35%	▲2.48
Total valid votes		89,163		
Rejected ballots		5,793	6.10%	▲3.29
Registered electors		129,475		▲7.47
INC hold		Swing	▲5.57	

=== Assembly Election 1994 ===
1994 Karnataka Legislative Assembly election : Dharwad Rural
Party	Candidate	Votes	%	±%
INC	Ambadagatti Shrikant Rudrappa	25,054	30.19%	▲2.23
JD	A. B. Desai	21,812	26.28%	▲2.62
KRRS	M. D. Najundaswamy	20,043	24.15%	New
BJP	Yeligar Ravi Ramachandra	11,472	13.82%	New
INC	K. K. Patil	2,611	3.15%	New
Independent	Teragaon Abdussami Huseinsab	898	1.08%	New
Independent	Mahadev Bhimappa Yeligar	889	1.07%	New
Margin of victory		3,242	3.91%	▼13.89
Turnout		85,379	70.87%	▼2.77
Total valid votes		82,984		
Rejected ballots		2,395	2.81%	▼2.95
Registered electors		120,471		▲7.78
INC gain from Kranti Sabha		Swing	▼15.57	

=== Assembly Election 1989 ===
1989 Karnataka Legislative Assembly election : Dharwad Rural
Party	Candidate	Votes	%	±%
Kranti Sabha	Patil Babagouda Rudragouda	35,497	45.76%	New
INC	Ambadagatti Shrikant Rudrappa	21,688	27.96%	▼13.06
JD	Desai Ayyappa Basavaraj	18,353	23.66%	New
JP	Kurunakoppa Basappa Kallappa	869	1.12%	New
Independent	Angadi Rudrappa Basavanneppa	795	1.02%	New
Margin of victory		13,809	17.80%	▲1.05
Turnout		82,309	73.64%	▲1.53
Total valid votes		77,566		
Rejected ballots		4,743	5.76%	▲2.88
Registered electors		111,772		▲27.42
Kranti Sabha gain from JP		Swing	▼12.01	

=== Assembly Election 1985 ===
1985 Karnataka Legislative Assembly election : Dharwad Rural
Party	Candidate	Votes	%	±%
JP	Desai Ayyappa Basavaraj	35,492	57.77%	▲17.13
INC	Pudakalakatti Channabasappa Virupaxappa	25,199	41.02%	▼14.98
Independent	Gudasalamani Davalsab Imamsab	587	0.96%	New
Margin of victory		10,293	16.75%	▲1.39
Turnout		63,256	72.11%	▲3.03
Total valid votes		61,436		
Rejected ballots		1,820	2.88%	▼1.84
Registered electors		87,722		▲6.93
JP gain from INC		Swing	▲1.77	

=== Assembly Election 1983 ===
1983 Karnataka Legislative Assembly election : Dharwad Rural
Party	Candidate	Votes	%	±%
INC	Pudakalakatti Channabasappa Virupaxappa	30,240	56.00%	▼8.91
JP	M. A. Contractor	21,946	40.64%	▲12.95
Independent	Ramaswamy Bheemmappa Surpur	638	1.18%	New
Independent	Neelagangayya Basayya Pujar	606	1.12%	New
Independent	Kallappa Irappa Dasankoppa	567	1.05%	New
Margin of victory		8,294	15.36%	▼21.86
Turnout		56,670	69.08%	
Total valid votes		53,997		
Rejected ballots		2,673	4.72%	
Registered electors		82,035		
INC hold		Swing	▼8.91	

=== Assembly By-election 1981 ===
1981 Karnataka Legislative Assembly by-election : Dharwad Rural
Party	Candidate	Votes	%	±%
INC	C. V. Pudakalakatti	27,317	64.91%	▲62.22
JP	H. M. Virupazappa	11,652	27.69%	▼4.59
BJP	B. Vibhuti	2,285	5.43%	New
Independent	Shekharappa. B	450	1.07%	New
Independent	H. Rangaswamy	381	0.91%	New
Margin of victory		15,665	37.22%	▲5.78
Total valid votes		42,085		
INC gain from INC(I)		Swing	▲1.19	

=== Assembly Election 1978 ===
1978 Karnataka Legislative Assembly election : Dharwad Rural
Party	Candidate	Votes	%	±%
INC(I)	Madiman Sumati Bhalachandra	30,354	63.72%	New
JP	Dasankop Abdul Hamid Hasansab	15,378	32.28%	New
INC	Wai Venkannacharya Vadhirajacharya	1,279	2.69%	▼67.68
Independent	Soppi Chandrashekhar Lingabasappa	622	1.31%	New
Margin of victory		14,976	31.44%	▼16.03
Turnout		49,921	68.86%	▲11.72
Total valid votes		47,633		
Rejected ballots		2,288	4.58%	▲4.58
Registered electors		72,498		▲22.35
INC(I) gain from INC		Swing	▼6.65	

=== Assembly Election 1972 ===
1972 Mysore State Legislative Assembly election : Dharwad Rural
Party	Candidate	Votes	%	±%
INC	M. Sumatibalachandra	22,710	70.37%	▼0.49
INC(O)	V. L. Patil	7,392	22.91%	New
SSP	B. I. Doddayallappa	2,170	6.72%	New
Margin of victory		15,318	47.47%	▲5.75
Turnout		33,857	57.14%	▼5.33
Total valid votes		32,272		
Registered electors		59,257		▲9.30
INC hold		Swing	▼0.49	

=== Assembly Election 1967 ===
1967 Mysore State Legislative Assembly election : Dharwad Rural
Party	Candidate	Votes	%	±%
INC	A. S. Vishwanathaprasad	22,267	70.86%	New
SWA	S. V. Veerabasayyaswami	9,157	29.14%	New
Margin of victory		13,110	41.72%	
Turnout		33,866	62.47%	
Total valid votes		31,424		
Registered electors		54,213		
INC win (new seat)				

== See also ==
- List of constituencies of the Karnataka Legislative Assembly
