= Subhash Mendhapurkar =

Subhash Mendhapurkar (born: Solapur, Maharashtra) is an India social activist based in the state of Himachal Pradesh, active in the fields of women's self-reliance, rural self-governance, rural healthcare, anti-alcoholism, microfinance, water management, and eco-management.

He is the founder and Director of SUTRA (Society for Social Uplift Through Rural Action), a non-governmental organization which has been credited for the socioeconomical transformation of thousands of illiterate rural women, especially widowed and divorced women, through various initiatives in the foothills of the Himalayas of the Shimla and Solan area. Subhash is the recipient of various awards and accolades including National Sarda Equal Opportunities Award, Man of the year award, 2008 and Peace award, 2005. He has been credited with stabilizing the otherwise dropping sex ratio in Solan District in Himachal Pradesh. Mendhapurkar is an alumnus of the Tata Institute of Social Sciences and has visited the International Centre for Integrated Mountain Development in Kathmandu.
