= H. Boniface Prabhu =

Wheelchair tennis player

- Country (sports): India
- Residence: Bengaluru
- Born: 14 May 1972 (age 54) Bengaluru, Karnataka
- Turned pro: 1993
- Plays: Left Handed

Singles
- Career record: 50–86
- Career titles: ??
- Highest ranking: No.17 (25 June 2007)
- Current ranking: No.48 (28 August 2014)

Doubles
- Career record: 14-39
- Career titles: ??
- Highest ranking: No.19 (29 July 2013)
- Current ranking: No.38 (28 August 2014)

Awards
Padma Shree
Swabhiman Award
Prathiba Bhushan
Rising Star of the Millennium Award
Ekalavya Award
Rajyotsava Award

Wheelchair tennis is one of the forms of tennis adapted for those who have disabilities in their lower bodies. The size of courts, balls, and rackets are same, but there are two major differences from pedestrian tennis; athletes use specially designed wheelchairs and the ball may bounce up to two times. The second bounce may also occur outside of the field

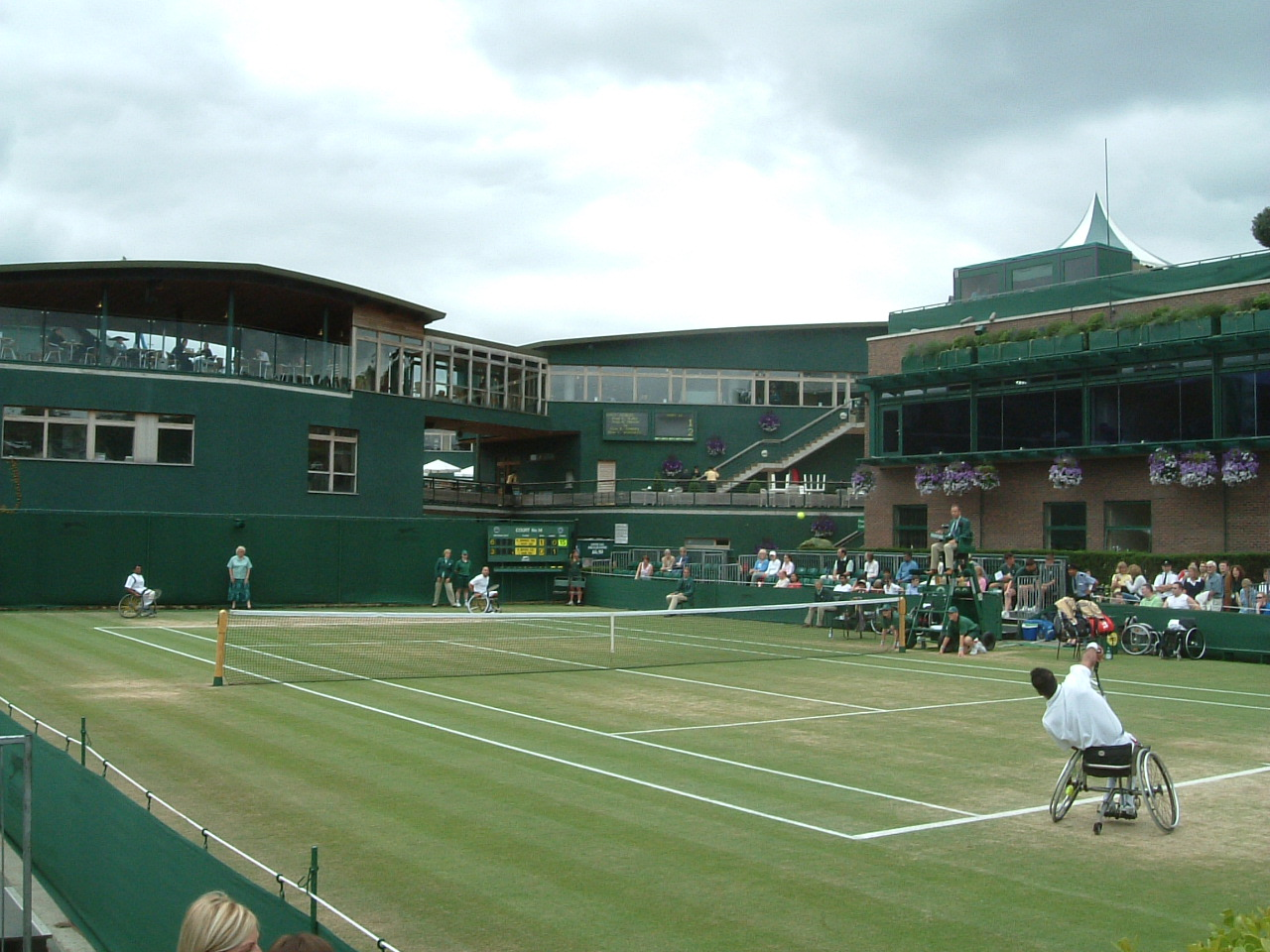
Wimbledon - Men's Wheelchair doubles

Harry Boniface Prabhu is an Indian quadriplegic wheelchair tennis player, one of the pioneers of the sport in India and a medal winner at the 1998 World Championships. He was awarded the Padma Shree, the fourth highest civilian award, by the Government of India, in 2014.

== Biography ==
Boniface Prabhu was born to Harry J. Prabhu and Fathima Prabhu, on 14 May 1972, at Bangalore, in the south Indian state of Karnataka, as a normal child like his two brothers, Jerry and George. The tragedy struck at the age of four, when a blotched lumbar puncture made him a quadriplegic for the rest of his life. However, he was brought up by his parents as a normal boy, sending him to institutions for normal children which helped the young Boniface to take up life as any competitive person would.

Boniface Prabhu is the founder of a trust, Boniface Prabhu Wheelchair Tennis Academy, based in Bangalore, with the aim of promoting the physically and intellectually disabled people and providing them with opportunities to nurture their talents. The academy provides free sports training to differently enabled people.

He took to the cause of PWDs with ThumbsUp by driving 3,500 km from Kashmir to Kanyakumari.

Boniface is married to Christina and the couple has a daughter, Simone Diya.

== Sporting career ==
Though Boniface's principal claim to fame is wheelchair tennis, he has excelled in other disciplines, too. He has represented India, at International events, in six disciplines, over 50 times. These include athletics, shot put, badminton, javelin throw, table tennis, shooting and discus throw, apart from wheelchair tennis. His foray into international sports was at the 1996 World Wheelchair Games, UK where he won gold medal in shot put and silver medal in discus throw. Two years later, he repeated the feat at the 1998 Paralympics World Championships, participating in javelin, shot put and discus throws. He is the first Indian to win a medal in the International Paralympic Games.

== Tennis career ==
Boniface Prabhu was fascinated with tennis at an early age when he used to be a fan of Ivan Lendl and John Macenroe. During his participation of the World Wheelchair Athletic Meet of 1996 in the UK, he chanced upon a game of wheelchair tennis and developed an instant liking to it. On returning to India, he approached Karnataka State Lawn Tennis Association for permission to use their courts for practice which he was granted. He talked to a local tennis coach and impressed upon him to teach him the game. He was a fast learner and in two years time, he started participating in tournaments.

- Winner - Sydney International Wheelchair Tennis Championship - 2007
- Winner - Singles - Florida open - 2004
- Winner - Doubles - Florida open - 2004
- Runner-up - Sydney International Wheelchair Open Tennis - 2003
- Quarter finalist - Australian Open International Wheelchair Tennis - 2003
- Winner - Japan Open Wheelchair Tennis Championship - 2001
- Winner - Sydney International Wheelchair Tennis Championship - 1999
- Runner up - Australian Open - 1999
- Semi finalist Singles - US Open - 1998
- Semi finalist Doubles - US Open - 1998

Boniface has reached a career best world ranking of 17 in singles and 19 in doubles. He has been the highest ranked player in Asia in 2011, present ranking being no. 2. He is the no. 1 player in India. He has won 11 career titles and has featured in the finals of all the grand slam tournaments.

== Awards and recognitions ==
- Padma Shri - Government of India - 2014
- Prathiba Bhushan
- Rising Star of the Millennium Award
- Ekalavya Award - Government of Karnataka - 2004
- Rajyotsava Award - Government of Karnataka - 2003
- Swabhiman Appreciation Award - Daijiworld Weekly - 2011

Boniface is the brand ambassador of India for wheelchair sports. He is also the brand ambassador for many commercial products.

== Arjuna award controversy ==
In 2005, The Ministry of Youth Affairs and Sports, Government of India, reportedly informed Boniface that he had been selected for Arjuna Award, the second highest award for excellence in sports, given by the Government of India. However, when the awards were announced, Boniface did not feature in the list. It was repeated for two years and in 2007, the apparent negligence yielded comments in the media. Boniface himself wondered why physically disabled sportspersons were being ignored. He has not received the Arjuna award till date.

== See also ==
- ITF Wheelchair Tennis Tour
- Wheelchair Tennis Masters
- List of quad wheelchair tennis champions
