= Ambigara Chowdaiya =

Indian Poet And Social Reformer

The Nijasharana Shri Ambigara Chowdaiya (also spelled Caudayya) was a Koli saint, poet and social critic in 12th century India. He was a ferryman or boatman who went to Kalyan, joined the Virasaiva movement there and followed Lingayatism. Influenced by Basava, his somewhat crude writings were critical of the higher castes. He has been described by K. A. Paniker as the angriest of the poets in the vachana movement. Revered as a saint because of his 274 inspiring Pravachans, he also challenged those who harassed women and those he considered to be religious charlatans. He taught that god certainly dwells in the heart of one who is pure in thoughts, words and deed.

A cave is named after Chowdaiya on the outskirts of Basavakalyan in Karnataka and that state's Department of Kannada and Culture assists in the annual celebrations of his jayanti.
