= S. J. Nagalotimath =

Indian medical scientist

Dr. Sadashivayya Jambayya Nagalotimath (20 July 1940 – 24 October 2006) was an Indian medical scientist and writer. He also served as the Director of Karnataka Institute of Medical Sciences, Hubli. He died on 24 October 2006 at the KLE Society's Hospital at the age of 66.
