= Hardekar Manjappa =

Kannadiga political activist (1886–1947)

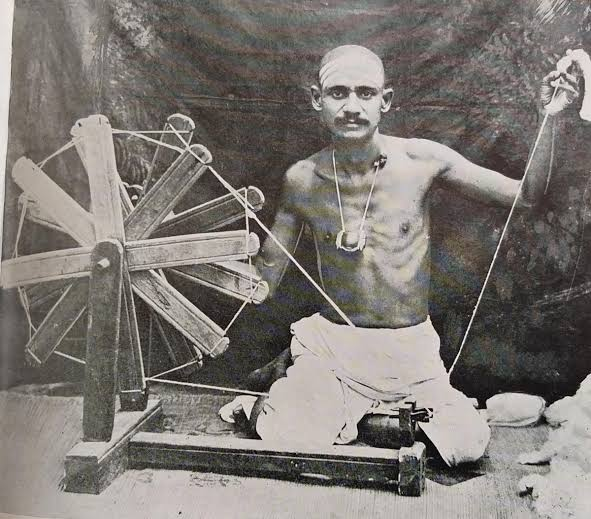
- Born: 18 February 1886; Banavasi, Uttara Kannada
- Died: 3 January 1947 (aged 60)
- Writing career
- Notable works: Indian Independence Movement, Gandhian, Kannada Literature, Social Reformer

Hardekar Manjappa (Kannada: ಹರ್ಡೇಕರ ಮಂಜಪ್ಪ; 1886–1947) was a Kannadiga political thinker, social reformer, writer and journalist. He is famously known as Gandhi of Karnataka.

== Early life and education ==
Manjappa was born in a poor family of Banavasi, a village of Uttara Kannada district. He studied in the nearby town of Sirsi and passed the Mulki (current primary education) final examination in 1903. He started his career as a teacher on a salary of seven rupees a month.

== Movement ==
Manjappa and his brother were involved in the Swadeshi movement. The brothers knew Marathi and opened a weekly Dhanurdhari (journal/newsletter), (kn:’ಧನುರ್ಧಾರಿ’), on 2 September 1906 with more than 10,000 subscribers. He was slowly drawn to Saint-Reformist Basavanna's teachings. Basava's teachings included the elimination of casteism and the myriad evils and superstitions connected with it. Manjappa wrote several booklets to bring out the essential teachings of Basava and tried to encourage unity among his latter day followers. In 1913, he started celebrating Basava Jayanthi publicly.

Manjappa opened an ashram school in Almatti in 1927. He toured villages of North Karnataka to create awareness about Gandhiji’s constructive work. He discerned a number of similarities between the teachings of Basavanna and Gandhi and Manjappa became adept at expressing these teachings in easily understandable language in public speeches.

== Later work ==
Manjappa delivered more than a thousand lectures on topics such as Satyagraha, patriotism and nationalism.

In 1924 with the help of his team 'Basweshara Seva Dala' he organized the Congress Party session in Belgaum. He had a leading role in the session and presented a book on Basavanna to Gandhi.

Manjappa was a freedom fighter who became popularly known as the "Gandhi of Karnataka".

He wrote more than 40 books including an autobiography.

Manjappa died on 3 January 1947.

== Literary works ==
Hardekar Manjappa contributed to Kannada literature and a prolific writer. Some of his works are as follows

1. Gandhi Charithre
2. Buddha Charithre
3. Basava Charithre
4. Buddhiya Maathu
5. Brahmacharya
6. Ahimse
