= Mansour (disambiguation) =

Mansour is a given name and a surname.

Mansour may also refer to:

- Mansour Mohamed al-Muslah, Qatari businessman.
- Mansour (singer) (born 1971), Iranian singer
- Mansour district, an administrative district of Baghdad, named for Al-Mansur
- Mansour neighbourhood, a neighborhood within Mansour district, Baghdad
- Mansour Group, an Egyptian company
- 20416 Mansour, a main-belt asteroid
- Mansour (TV Series), an Emirati animated television series

== See also ==
- Mansur (disambiguation)
