= Mansur, Astrakhan Oblast =

Mansur Мансур
- Settlement
- Location within Astrakhan Oblast Location within Russia
- Coordinates: 46°13′N 47°57′E
- Country: Russia
- Region: Astrakhan Oblast
- District: Privolzhsky District
- Time zone: UTC+4:00

Mansur (Russian: Мансур) is a rural locality (a settlement) in Tatarobashmakovsky Selsoviet, Privolzhsky District, Astrakhan Oblast, Russia. The population was 138 as of 2010. There are 4 streets.

== Geography ==
Mansur is located 34 km southwest of Nachalovo (the district's administrative centre) by road. Assadulayevo is the nearest rural locality.
