= Veeranna Aivalli =

Indian Police Service officer

- Born: 1943
- Died: 2002 (aged 58–59)
- Occupations: IPS Officer, IGP Officer
- Known for: Commissioner of Bureau of Civil Aviation Security, Chairman of the Aviation Security Audit Programme

Veeranna Aivalli (1943-2002) was an Indian Police Service officer and former commissioner of Bureau of Civil Aviation Security, under the Ministry of Civil Aviation, Government of India. He is widely remembered for being the Chairman of the Aviation Security Audit Programme in the International Civil Aviation Organization, the specialized agency of the United Nations at Montreal, Quebec. Aivalli also served as the Inspector General of Police in Jammu and Kashmir. A debate competition by name Veeranna Aivalli Memorial Debate has been organized every year for university students by Indian Institute of Public Administration in J&K in his memory.
