= Rajshekhar Mansur =

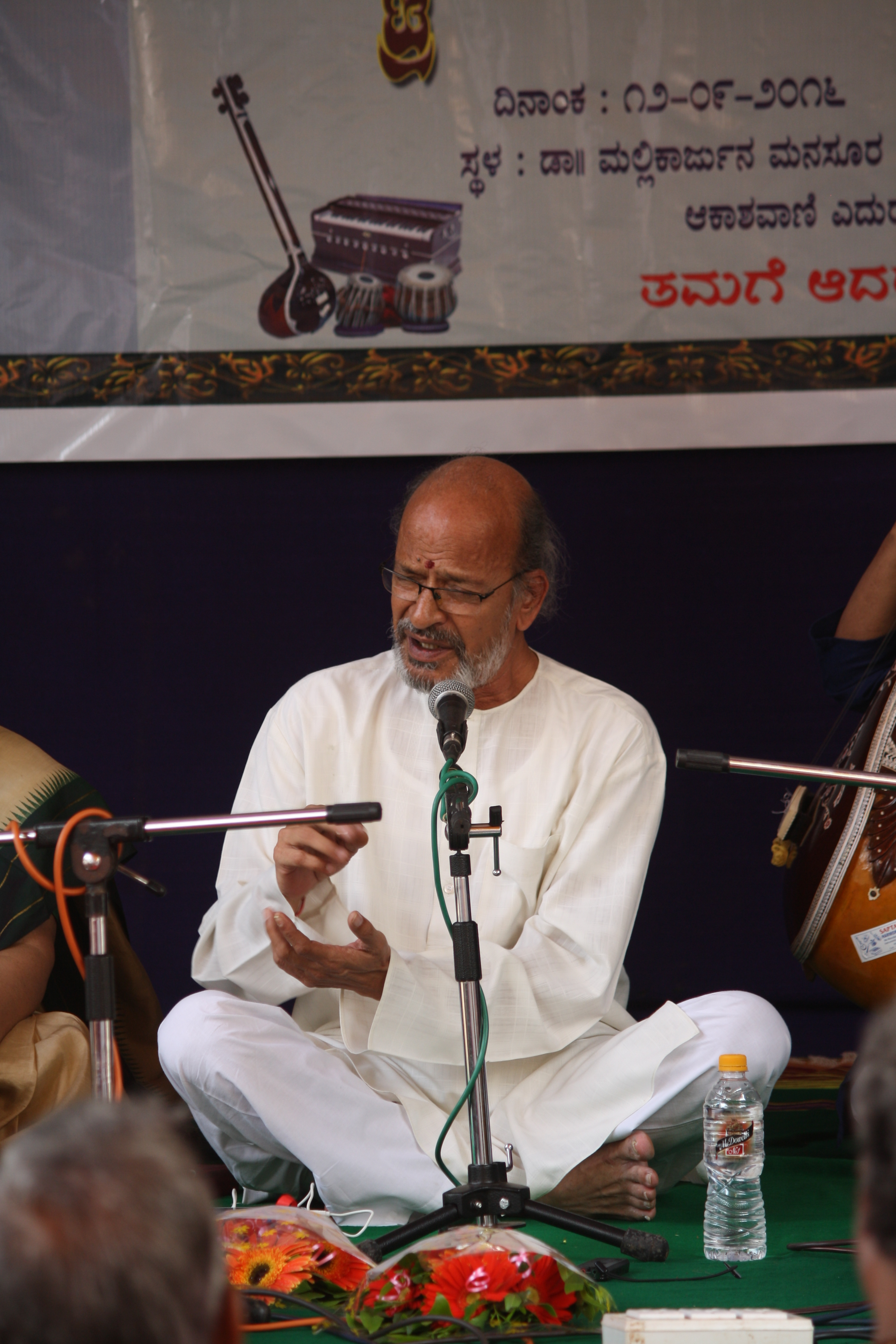

Background information
- Born: Rajshekhar Mansur; 16 December 1942
- Origin: Dharwad, India
- Died: May 1, 2022 (aged 79)
- Genre: Indian classical music
- Occupation: Vocalist
- Instrument: Vocal
- Years active: 1975–2022
- Website: http://rajshekharmansur.com

Rajshekhar Mansur (16 December 1942 - 1 May 2022) was an Indian classical vocalist of the Jaipur-Atrauli gharana. He was the son and disciple of vocalist Mallikarjun Mansur.

== Early life and education ==
Mansur was born to singer Mallikarjun Mansur, one of the leading singers of the Jaipur-Atrauli gharana. At the age of 18 he won the gold medal in the Sangeet Visharad exam and went on to take first prize in the AIR Youth Music Competition.

He completed his M.A. in English Literature and an M.A. in linguistics from the University of Wales on a British Council Scholarship.

== Career ==
Rajshekhar Mansur started accompanying his father in concerts at age 20, however his father insisted upon him to have a regular job instead of being a full-time musician. Mansur taught literature and linguistics for nearly 35 years and retired as a Professor and Chairman of the English Department, Karnataka University, Dharwad. He also taught English at P.G.Centre Gulbarga. At the same time, he continued to sing, giving vocal support to his father and performing independently at various prestigious music festivals and for the All India Radio.

He had performed in many prestigious music festivals throughout the country. The Karnataka Government had recognised his contributions to music by awarding him the Rajyotsava Award (1997). He was nominated as the chairman of Karnataka Sangeet Nrutya Akademi (2005–2008). He is also the recipient of Karnataka Kalashri Gaurav Award (2009). His music has been preserved in the archives of Indira Gandhi Manav Sangrahalaya in Bhopal. On 7 September 2009, he released his music album, In The Footsteps and Beyond to coinciding with his 60th birthday.

In 2012, he was awarded the Sangeet Natak Akademi Award, the highest award for performing artists, conferred by the Sangeet Natak Akademi, India's National Academy for Music, Dance and Drama. In 2016, he was conferred the Ustad Bismillah Khan and Pandit Sanna Bharamanna Smarak Rashtriya Puraskar by the Tansen Academy of Music, Chennai
