= Bhavurao Deshpande =

Indian politician

The Hon'ble Bhavurao Venkatrao Deshpande MLA

Member, Karnataka Legislative Assembly
- In office 1978–1983
- Constituency: Hubli-Dharwad

Bhavurao Venkatrao Deshpande was a senior leader of the Bharatiya Janata Party (BJP) and is considered as one of the founding fathers of the BJP in Karnataka, India.

He was associated with the Rashtriya Swayamsevak Sangh from a very young age and after completing his education, he dedicated his life to the service of the nation and propagating nationalist thought by becoming a full-time worker (Pracharak) of the RSS. He was later deputed to serve the fledgling Bharatiya Jana Sangh, the political arm of the RSS. He traveled extensively throughout Karnataka along with Jagannathrao Joshi and built the party brick by brick. He was arrested along with thousands of other Opposition leaders and workers during the Emergency. After the formation of the Janata Party, he became the General Secretary of the state unit of the party. In 1978, he was elected to the Karnataka Legislative Assembly from Hubli-Dharwad. He was one of the founding leaders of the BJP and was the state general secretary of the party, and later its vice president. He groomed many young leaders of the BJP such as B.B. Shivappa, B.S. Yeddyurappa, Ananth Kumar, K.S.Eshwarappa, Jagadish Shettar and others.

He died on 16 May 1984.
