= Hubli-Dharwad West Assembly constituency =

Legislative Assembly constituency in Karnataka State, India

Coordinates: 15.35°N 75.05°E

Hubli-Dharwad West
- Constituency No. 74 for the Karnataka Legislative Assembly

Constituency details
- Country: India
- Region: South India
- State: Karnataka
- District: Dharwad
- Lok Sabha constituency: Dharwad
- Established: 2008
- Total electors: 263,230
- Reservation: None

Member of Legislative Assembly
- 16th Karnataka Legislative Assembly
- Incumbent Aravind Bellad
- Party: Bharatiya Janata Party
- Elected year: 2023
- Preceded by: Chandrakant Bellad

Hubli-Dharwad West Assembly constituency is one of the 224 Legislative Assembly constituencies of Karnataka in India.

It is part of Dharwad district. As of 2023, it is represented by Aravind Bellad of the Bharatiya Janata Party.

== Members of the Legislative Assembly ==
Election	Member	Party
2008	Chandrakant Bellad	Bharatiya Janata Party
2013	Arvind Bellad	Bharatiya Janata Party
2018	Arvind Bellad	Bharatiya Janata Party
2023	Arvind Bellad	Bharatiya Janata Party

== Election results ==
=== Assembly Election 2023 ===
2023 Karnataka Legislative Assembly election : Hubli-Dharwad West
Party	Candidate	Votes	%	±%
BJP	Arvind Bellad	101,410	59.45%	▼1.71
INC	Deepak Chinchore	62,717	36.77%	▲1.28
NOTA	None of the above	1,808	1.06%	▼0.18
JD(S)	Gururaj Istalingappa Hunasimarad	1,195	0.70%	New
Margin of victory		38,693	22.68%	▼2.99
Turnout		171,586	65.18%	▲3.39
Total valid votes		170,567		
Registered electors		263,230		▲3.13
BJP hold		Swing	▼1.71	

=== Assembly Election 2018 ===
2018 Karnataka Legislative Assembly election : Hubli-Dharwad West
Party	Candidate	Votes	%	±%
BJP	Arvind Bellad	96,462	61.16%	▲29.24
INC	Mohammad Ismail Tamatgar	55,975	35.49%	▲12.07
NOTA	None of the above	1,962	1.24%	New
Margin of victory		40,487	25.67%	▲17.17
Turnout		157,730	61.79%	▲4.18
Total valid votes		157,728		
Registered electors		255,252		▲15.72
BJP hold		Swing	▲29.24	

=== Assembly Election 2013 ===
2013 Karnataka Legislative Assembly election : Hubli-Dharwad West
Party	Candidate	Votes	%	±%
BJP	Arvind Bellad	42,003	31.92%	▼24.05
INC	S. R. Morey	30,821	23.42%	▼1.85
JD(S)	Ismail Tamatgar	30,312	23.04%	▲9.97
KJP	Mohan Limbikai	12,216	9.28%	New
Independent	Gururaj Istalingappa Hunasimarad	2,471	1.88%	New
BSRCP	Dambal Hanumant	1,807	1.37%	New
Independent	Suresh Veerabhadrappa Katagi	1,091	0.83%	New
Independent	Laxman Basappa Doddamani	1,066	0.81%	New
LSP	Nagaraj Tigadi	843	0.64%	New
Margin of victory		11,182	8.50%	▼22.20
Turnout		127,085	57.61%	▲1.53
Total valid votes		131,588		
Registered electors		220,579		▲13.84
BJP hold		Swing	▼24.05	

=== Assembly Election 2008 ===
2008 Karnataka Legislative Assembly election : Hubli-Dharwad West
Party	Candidate	Votes	%	±%
BJP	Chandrakant Bellad	60,800	55.97%	New
INC	Honnalli Jabbarkhan Hayatakhan	27,453	25.27%	New
JD(S)	Tamatgar Mohmad Ismail	14,200	13.07%	New
BSP	P. H. Neeralkeri	1,931	1.78%	New
Independent	Reeta Pavate	1,523	1.40%	New
Independent	Prashant Sugur	978	0.90%	New
Margin of victory		33,347	30.70%	
Turnout		108,662	56.08%	
Total valid votes		108,626		
Registered electors		193,760		
BJP win (new seat)				

== See also ==
- List of constituencies of the Karnataka Legislative Assembly
- Dharwad district
