= Vinay Kulkarni =

Indian politician

Vinay Rajashekarappa Kulkarni

Minister of State for Mines and Geology, Government of Karnataka
- In office 30 October 2015 – May 2018
- Preceded by: Jagadish Shettar (Chief Minister)
- Succeeded by: Rajashekar Patil

Member of the Karnataka Legislative Assembly
- In office 2023–2026
- Preceded by: Amrut Desai

In-Charge minister of Dharwad District
- In office 17 May 2013 – May 2018

Personal details
- Born: 7 November 1968 (age 57) Gummagol, Karnataka
- Party: Indian National Congress
- Spouse: Shivaleela
- Children: 2 daughters, 1 son
- Education: Dharwad, Karnataka, India.

Vinay Kulkarni is an Indian politician from Karnataka and a member of the Indian National Congress and a convicted murderer. He has represented the Dharwad constituency in the Karnataka Legislative Assembly and has served as a minister in the Government of Karnataka.

== Early life and education ==
Vinay Kulkarni hails from Dharwad district in Karnataka, where he developed an early interest in public life and local politics. He was associated with grassroots-level activities in the region before entering mainstream politics.

== Political career ==
Kulkarni began his political career with the Indian National Congress and gradually established himself as a key figure in Dharwad district politics.

He was elected as a Member of the Karnataka Legislative Assembly from the Dharwad constituency, representing the Congress party. During his tenure, he was associated with local development initiatives and constituency-level governance.

Kulkarni later served as a minister in the Karnataka government, handling portfolios related to urban development and municipal administration. His role involved overseeing urban infrastructure and civic bodies across the state.

== Electoral Performance ==
Karnataka Legislative Assembly
| Year | Constituency | Party | Votes | % | Opponent | Party | Opponent votes | % | Margin | Margin % | Result |
|---|---|---|---|---|---|---|---|---|---|---|---|
| 2008 | Dharwad | INC | 34,694 | 31.10 | Seema Ashok Masuti | BJP | 35,417 | 31.75 | 723 | 0.65% | LOST |
| 2013 | Dharwad | INC | 53,453 | 49.00 | Amrut Desai | JD(S) | 35,133 | 32.20 | 18,320 | 16.79% | WON |
| 2018 | Dharwad | INC | 64,783 | 41.63 | Amrut Desai | BJP | 85,123 | 54.70 | 20,340 | 13.07% | LOST |
| 2023 | Dharwad | INC | 89,333 | 53.92 | Amrut Desai | BJP | 71,296 | 43.04 | 18,037 | 10.89 | WON |

== Murder Conviction ==
Yogesh Gowda murder case In June 2016, Yogesh Gowda, a Bharatiya Janata Party (BJP) leader and former Dharwad Zilla Panchayat member, was murdered at a gym in Dharwad, Karnataka. The case later gained significant attention and was handed over to the Central Bureau of Investigation (CBI) in 2019 for further investigation.

According to the CBI, the murder was the result of a larger conspiracy linked to political rivalry, and Vinay Kulkarni was named as one of the key accused. Investigators alleged that hired assailants carried out the attack.

Kulkarni was arrested by the CBI in November 2020 and was granted conditional bail by the Supreme Court in August 2021. However, in June 2025, the Supreme Court cancelled his bail, citing concerns about alleged attempts to influence witnesses during the trial.

After several years of investigation and trial involving multiple accused and numerous witnesses, a special court in Bengaluru delivered its verdict on 15 April 2026. Kulkarni and 16 other co-accused were convicted in connection with the murder of a Bharatiya Janata Party leader.
