= K. Marulasiddappa =

Indian writer

K. Marulasiddappa is an exponent of drama and a writer in the Kannada language. A resident of the state of Karnataka in India, he was also the former chairman of the Karnataka Nataka Academy which is an institution formed to encourage the growth of theatre in Karnataka.

== Books ==
- Satpadi sahitya (Samanyanige sahitya charitre) (1975)
- Kannada nataka samikshe (1986)
- Kannada nataka vimarse (Kannada Adhyayana Kendra Male)(1978)
