= Bellad Bagewadi =

Bellad Bagewadi Bagewadi
- Village
- Location in Karnataka, India Bellad Bagewadi (India)
- Coordinates: 16°18′0.982″N 74°43′11.026″E
- Country: India
- State: Karnataka
- District: Belgaum
- Talukas: Hukeri

Population (2011)
  - Total: 12,892

Languages
  - Official: Kannada
- Time zone: UTC+5:30 (IST)
- PIN: 591305
- Telephone code: 08333
- Nearest city: Ghataprabha
- Lok Sabha constituency: Chikkodi
- Vidhan Sabha constituency: Hukkeri
- Climate: Moderate (Köppen)

Bellad Bagewadi ( Kan - ಬೆಲ್ಲದ್ ಬಾಗೇವಾಡಿ ) is a village in the southern state of Karnataka, India. It is located in the Hukeri taluk of Belgaum district in Karnataka.

== Demographics ==
As of 2001 India census, Bagewadi had a population of 9045 with 4575 males and 4470 females. It is located in the eastern part of Hukkeri. Schedule caste, Lingayats, and Jains are the major communities there. Bellad Bagewadi homes "The Bellad Bagewadi Krishi Seva Sahakari Sangha" is one of the oldest in the country established in 1905.

Bharatesh Vidyalay is located in Bellad Bagewadi. It is established in 1957. It is famous for its Gurukul style of education. One more educational institute in the town in Mahanteshwar Vidya Sansthe, giving all modern education to children of the surrounding area.

Famous Vishwa sugars is situated in the town giving employment to thousands of people. The steel plant is also proposed to be established in the town.

Bellad Bagewadi is also known for its cricket tournament that happens every year. Teams from all over the state, Goa, and Maharashtra also come to play.

The town is known for its good quality sugar cane, hence the name. Bella means Jaggery in Kannada.

The town celebrates Shree Durga Devi jaatre (festival) at every 5 years with victory, and happiness.

== See also ==
- Belgaum
- Districts of Karnataka
