= Satish Hiremath =

American mayor

Mayor of Oro Valley, Arizona
- In office May 2010 – November 6, 2018
- Succeeded by: Joe Winfield

Personal details
- Born: July 14, 1963 (age 63) Easton, Pennsylvania, United States of America
- Spouse: Stacy
- Children: 3 sons and 1 daughter
- Education: University of Michigan; Howard University College of Dentistry
- Profession: Dentist

Satish Hiremath (born 1963 in Easton, Pennsylvania) is an American politician who was the Mayor of Oro Valley, Arizona. He is a practicing dentist and one of the oldest practitioners of dentistry in Oro Valley. Hiremath is an American citizen of ethnic Indian origin. Hiremath is only the second Mayor of East Indian descent in the United States.
