= Sangamesh Saundattimath =

Indian linguist

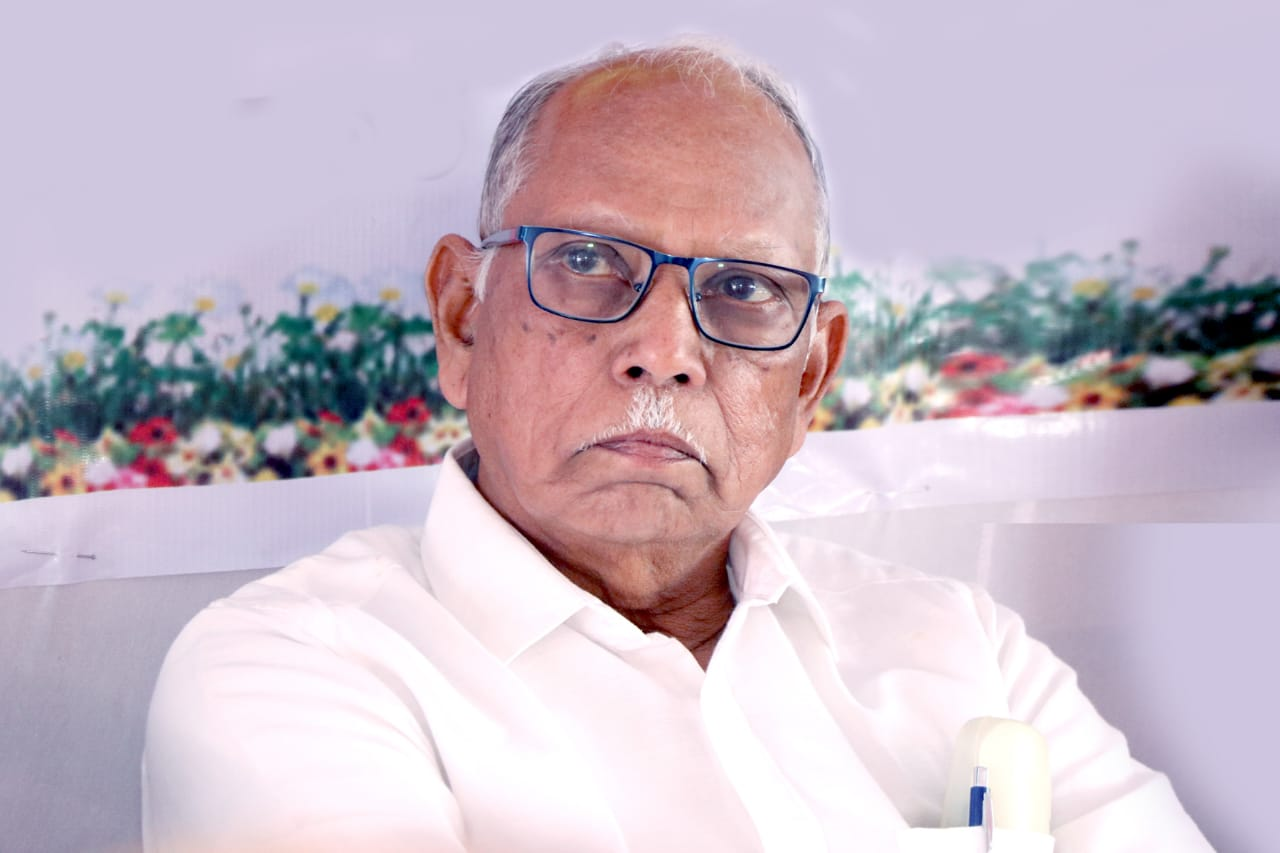
- Born: April 01, 1943 (age 83); Murgod, Karnataka, India
- Occupations: professor; researcher
- Spouse: Shakuntala Savadattimath

Sangamesh Saundattimath (born 1 April 1943) is a Kannada linguist. His other areas of books include Kannada research, critics, literature.

== Career ==
He has served as a professor of Kannada at Karnatak University Dharwad, Gulbarga University, for over 33 years and after retirement, he was selected as emeritus professor by U.G.C. He was holding a number of administrative positions at the time of his service such as dean of Faculty of Arts, chairman of the Institute of Kannada studies (Gulbarga University), student welfare officer (Gulbarga University), special officer (P.G. Centre, Raichur) etc. He is also currently working as a resource person in Central Institute of Indian Languages.
