= Uttaradi Math =

Hindu monastery

Sri Uttaradi Math
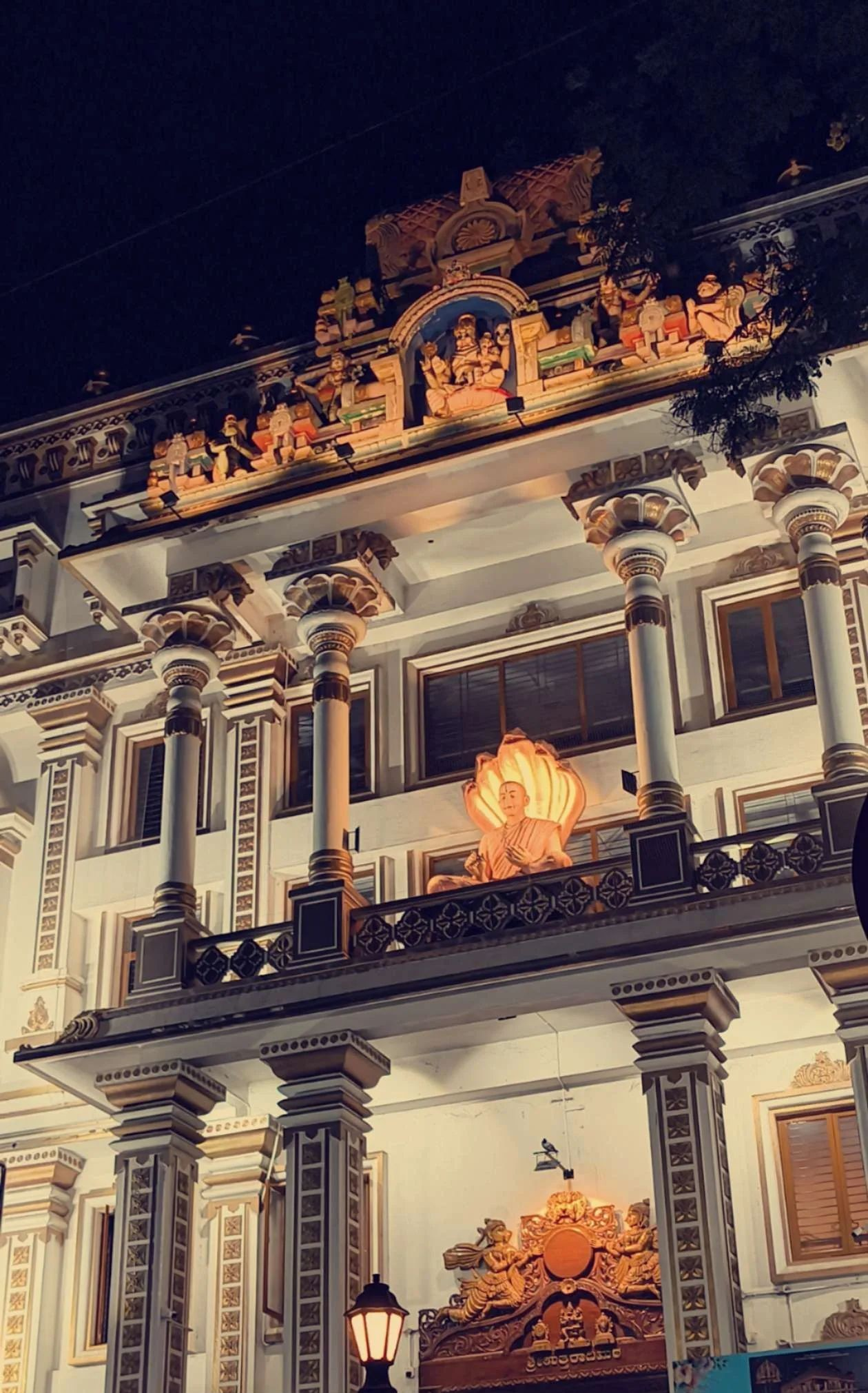
- Sri Uttaradi Matha building, Bangalore, India
- Founder: Madhvacharya
- Present Peetadhipati: Satyatma Tirtha
- Website: https://uttaradimath.org/

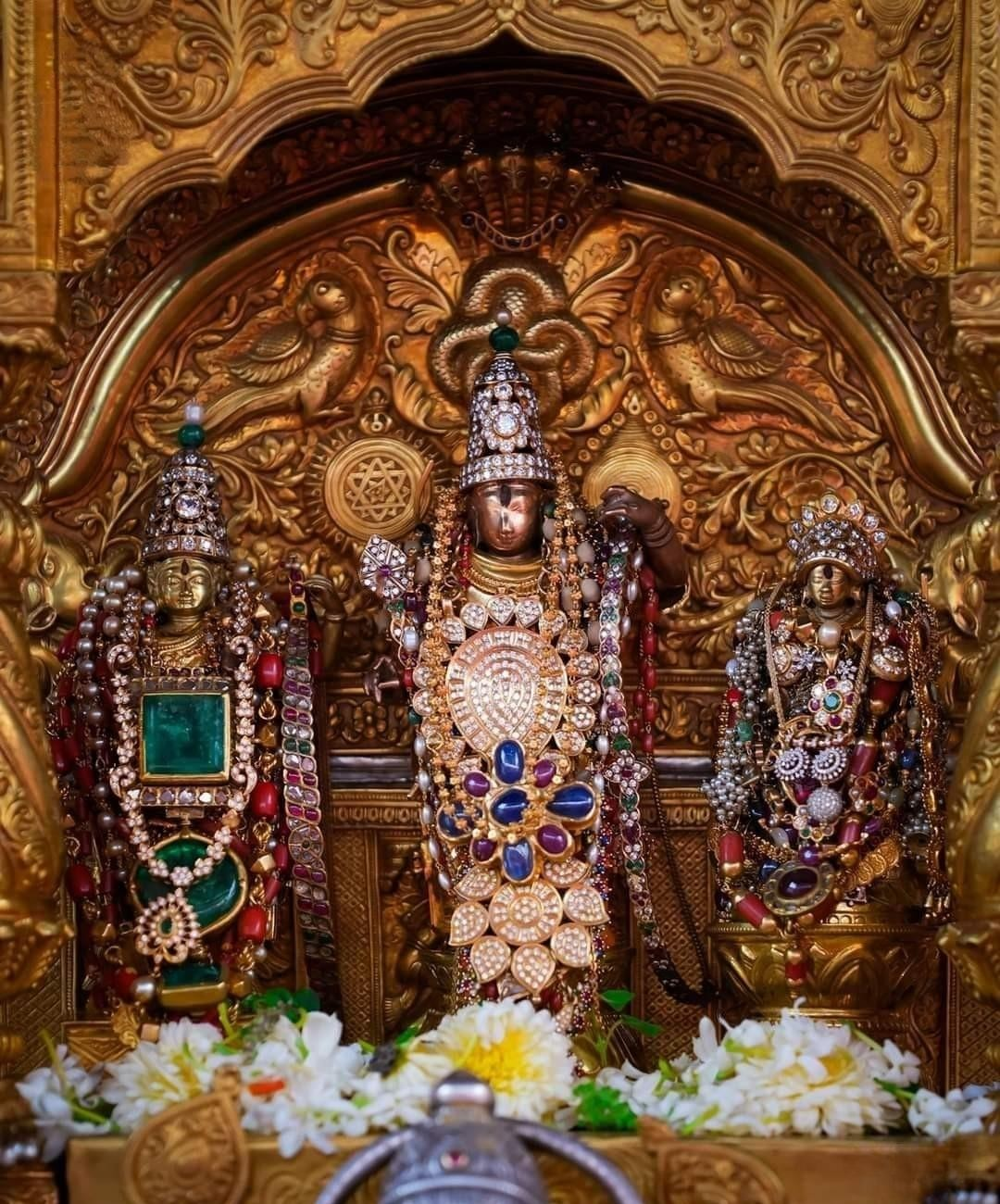
Shri Digvijaya Rama, Shri Moola Rama, Shri Moola Sita deities at Shri Uttaradi Math.

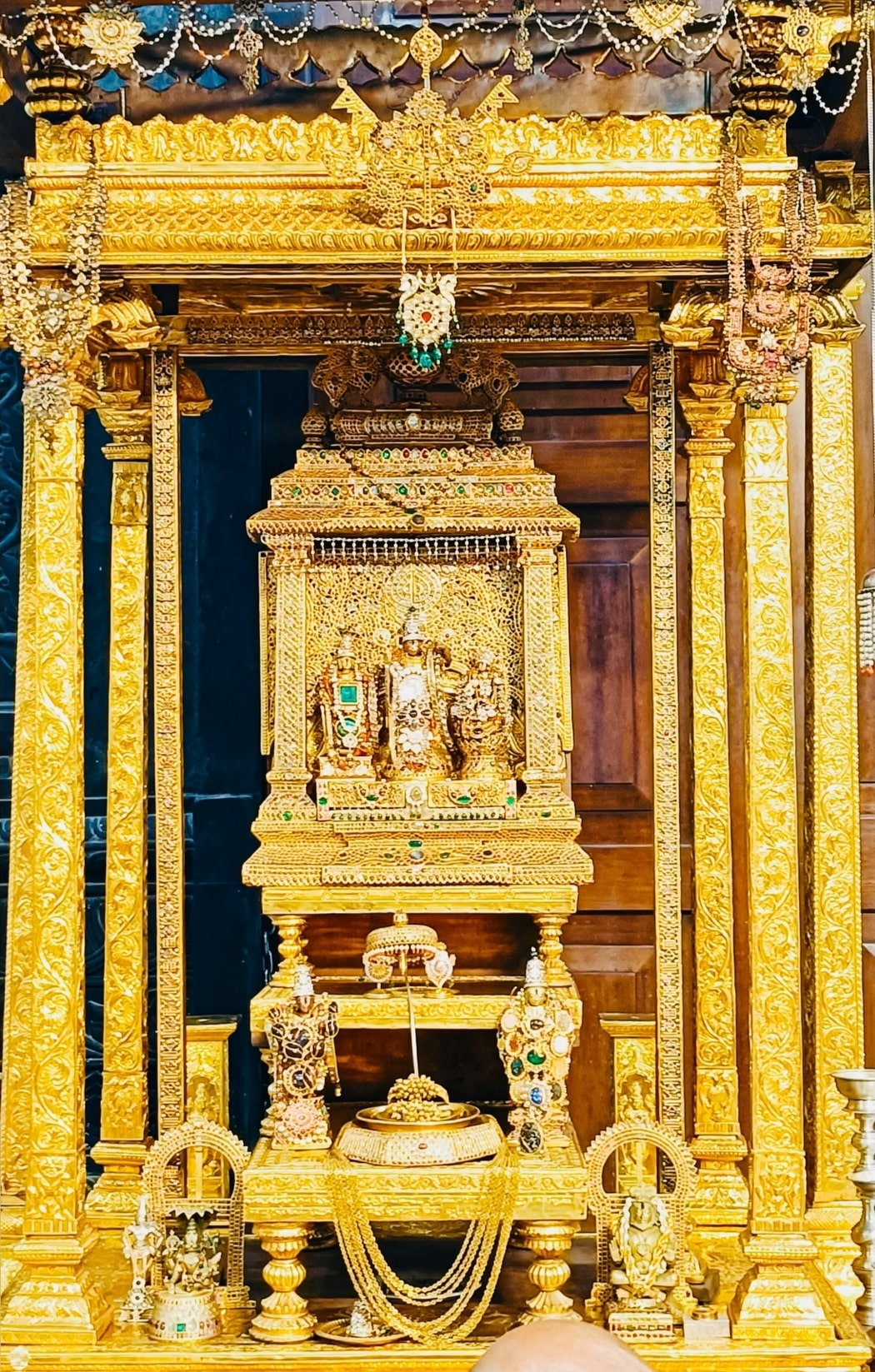
Samsthana Pooja Vaibhava of Shri Uttaradi Matha.

Sri Uttaradi Math (also written as Uttaradi Matha or Uttaradi Mutt; IAST:Śrī Uttarādi Maṭha, also known as Uttaradi Pitha, is one of the main monasteries (matha) founded by Madhvacharya with Padmanabha Tirtha as its head to preserve and propagate Dvaita Vedanta (Tattvavada) outside Tulunadu region. Uttaradi Math is one of the three primary Dvaita monasteries or Mathatraya that descended from Madhvacharya in the lineage of Padmanabha Tirtha through Jayatirtha. After Jayatirtha and Vidyadhiraja Tirtha, Uttaradi Matha continued in the lineage of Kavindra Tirtha (a disciple of Vidyadhiraja Tirtha) and later in the lineage of Vidyanidhi Tirtha (a disciple of Ramachandra Tirtha). The Moola Rama and Moola Sita deities worshipped in the Uttaradi Matha have a long history and are revered among adherents.

Uttaradi Math is an important institution among the Madhvas and also respected among the Vaishnavas and the other Hindus. Most of the Deshastha Madhva Brahmins and majority of Madhvas outside Tulu Nadu region are followers of this matha. Uttaradi Matha has followers across Karnataka (outside Tulunadu region), Maharashtra, Andhra Pradesh, Telangana, Madhya Pradesh, Tamil Nadu and Bihar (especially Gaya) regions.

The Uttaradi Matha is one of the major Hindu monastic institutions that has historically coordinated monastic activities through satellite institutions in India, preserved Sanskrit literature and pursued Dvaita studies. The Uttaradi Matha has been a library and a source of historic Sanskrit manuscripts. Along with other Hindu monasteries, this matha has been active in preserving the Vedas, sponsoring students and recitals, Sanskrit scholarship, and celebrating the annual Madhva Jayanti. The current pithadhipati or the acharya holding the pontifical seat is Satyatma Tirtha, the 42nd Jagadguru in the spiritual succession of pontiffs of this matha.

== Etymology ==
According to tradition, "Uttarādi" (Sanskrit: उत्तरादि) refers to "Vishnu who lifts us from the cycle of Saṃsāra" and "Matha" (Sanskrit: मठ) refers to "cloister, institute" or temple for spiritual studies. It is the 494th name of Vishnu in Vishnu Sahasranama.

Historian C. Hayavadana Rao says, "The Uttarādi Mutt ( i.e., the original North Mutt as it was first presided over by men drawn from the North or Uttara Desa ) is the prime pontifical seat of Madhvācharya". Author H. Chittaranjan says, "Saint Padmanabha Tirtha was given Deeksha by Madhvacharya himself to spread the Dvaita school of thought in northern Karnataka region. Since the Swamiji spread the Dvaita philosophy in the northern parts of Karnataka, the Mutt established there gained the name Uttaradi Mutt". Sharma opines that, "The Uttaradi Mutt has a territorial designation as its Pontificate has been occupied by Uttara-Karnatakas or Uttaradi-Karnatakas".

As per traditional accounts, Uttaradi Matha was the main matha that descended from Madhvacharya through Padmanabha Tirtha, Narahari Tirtha, Madhava Tirtha, Akshobya Tirtha, Jayatirtha, Vidyadhiraja Tirtha, and Kavindra Tirtha, hence this matha is also known as "Adi Matha" or "Moola Matha" or "Moola Samsthana" or "Moola Maha Samsthana of Sri Madhvacharya" or "Padmanabha Tirtha Matha". Uttaradi Matha was also once used to be called "Sri Satyabodha Swamy Matha" after its famous peetadipathi and saint Satyabodha Tirtha of Savanur.

== History ==
During the time's of Satyaprajna Tirtha there was a continuous conflict between the followers of Dvaita and Advaita Vedantas. According to Manimanjari and Madhva Vijaya, Ananda Tirtha was born as an incarnation of Vayu (the Wind God) to give correct interpretation of Vedanta and challenge the doctrine of Shankara, who taught Advaita Vedanta in which the individual souls or jivas were considered same as Brahman. Some Shankara's followers who were egoistic, destroyed the monasteries of their opponents and indulged in a sinful acts. The teacher Satyaprajna Tirtha was also killed, his disciple and successor Prajna Tirtha was converted to faith of Advaita by force. However, the disciples of Satya-prajna Tirtha and Prajna Tirtha remained secretly attached to true Vedanta and continued to practice their doctrine secretly. Achyuta Preksha Tirtha, the teacher of Madhvacharya was of this line.

According to tradition, it was said that at the time of Achyuta Preksha who was the pontiff of Adi matha, on the ordain of Veda Vyasa, Vayu incarnated in this world as Madhvacharya on the day of Vijaya Dashami in 1238 AD for the purpose of consolidating Hindu dharma. Uttaradi Matha was descended from Madhva through Padmanabha Tirtha, Jayatirtha and his disciples. The Uttaradi Matha does not have any headquarters as such, though sometimes some places have received special attention. It is mainly an itinerant institution moving and camping from place to place, busy carrying the torch of spiritual learning where ever it goes.

=== Spread of Dvaita ===
Padmanabha Tirtha and his descendants are responsible for the spread of Dvaita Vedanta outside Tulu Nadu region. Sharma says Narahari Tirtha is considered to be the forerunner of the Vaishnava devotional movement of the Dasakuta of Haridasa movement in Kannada. The doctrine of Tattvavada was further carried on and was spread all over the country by Jayatirtha and his descendants.

In the first quarter of the 17th century, Vidyadhisha Tirtha (16th pontiff of Uttaradi Matha) was able to gain some converts to the Madhva fold, in Bihar, from among the Brahmins of Gaya, who still profess allegiance to Madhva school. Satyanatha Tirtha during his time as the peetadhipathi of Uttarādi matha visited Gaya and strengthened the hold of the matha among Gayapalas, who had been converted to Madhvism by his predecessor Vidyadhisha Tirtha.

== Deities worshipped ==
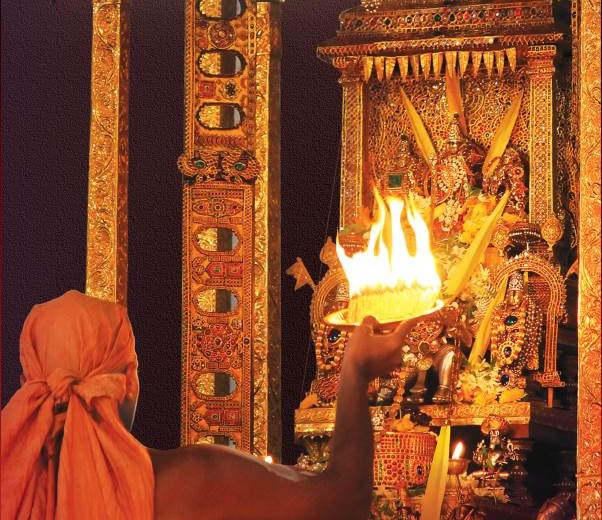
Shri Satyatma Tirtha Swamiji worshipping Shri Moola Rama, Shri Moola Sita and other divine deities.

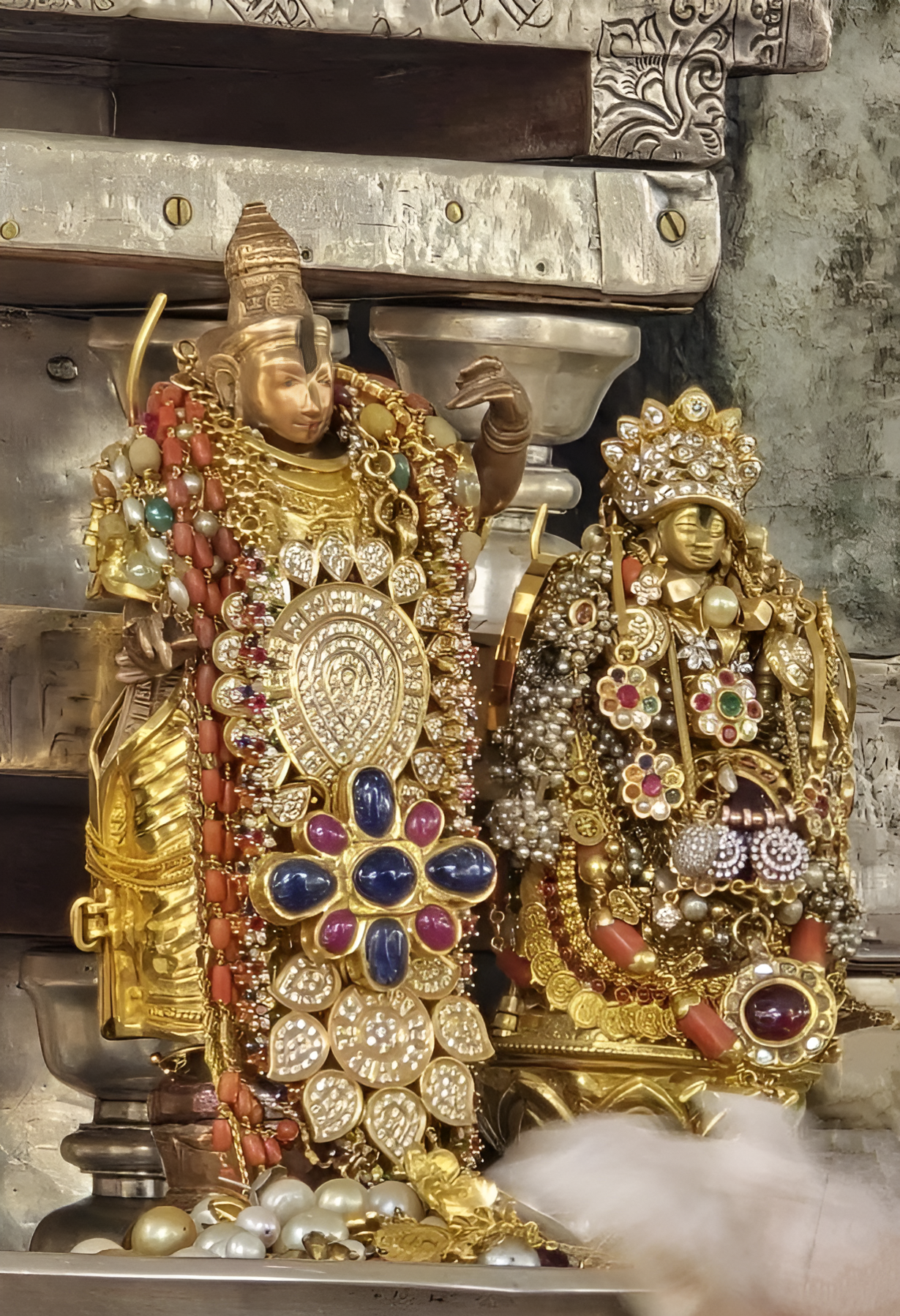
Shri Moola Rama and Shri Moola Sita Devi deities at Shri Uttaradi Math

Moola Rama is the supreme deity worshipped at Utttaradi Matha. Moola Rama and Moola Sita deities worshipped in Uttaradi Matha are "Chaturyuga Murthy's" (these deities has been in worship since Four Yugas). These two deities were brought by Sri Narahari Tirtha as per the orders of Sri Madhvacharya from Gajapati kings. Madhvacharya passed them on to his disciple Padmanabha Tirtha. Along with the Moola Rama and Moola Sita deities, the deity of Digvijaya Rama, which Madhvacharya got sculpted for himself, Vamsha Rama deity obtained by Madhava Tirtha and Prasanna Vittala deity obtained by Akshobya Tirtha are also worshipped in the matha.

Madhvacharya was presented with 8 Vyasamushtis by Vedavyasa during his return from Badrikashrama. Quoting about these Vyasamushtis, German Indologist Helmuth von Glasenapp says, five Vyasamushtis out of the eight Vyasamushtis are in Uttaradi Matha. Purandara Dasa glorified 28 main deities worshipped at Uttaradi Matha along with Moola Rama and Moola Sita deities, the 5 Vyasamushtis (4 Vyasamushtis, 1 Kurma Saligrama) in one of his songs — "Madhvarayara Devatarcaneya Prasiddha Raghunatharu Poojisuva Sobagu". Vijaya Dasa composed "Moola Rama Banda Suladi" on Moola Rama at Uttaradi Matha. In this song, he also describes both Moola Sita Rama once in the middle of the song. Prasanna Venkata Dasa wrote "Moola Rama Mahima Suladi" describing Moola Rama at Uttaradi Matha. Sanskrit Scholar V. R. Panchamukhi says, "Sri Sri Satyatmatirtha always worships the auspicious Moola Rama, the Lord of Goddess Lakshmi, always accompanied by Goddess Sīta". Satyasandha Tirtha, the 26th peetadhipathi of Uttaradi Math wrote "Ashtavimshati Murti Stuti" in praise of 28 divine deities worshipped at Uttaradi Matha along with Moola Rama and Moola Sita deities.

== Bifurcation of mathas ==
Madhvacharya initiated Padmanabha Tirtha as his successor to the main matha and instructed to spread Tattvavada (Dvaita) outside Tulunadu region, especially in the North Karnataka and Maharashtra regions since Padmanabha Tirtha was from Puntamba (now in Maharashtra). After Padmanabha Tirtha, Narahari Tirtha continued as the peetadhipathi of the matha and continued to spread Tattvavada in Andhra Pradesh and Telangana. After him Madhava Tirtha, Akshobya Tirtha, Jayatirtha and Vidyadhiraja Tirtha occupied the throne of the main matha. As per the traditional accounts, this main matha was divided twice, so we end up with three mathas. They are Uttaradi Math, Vyasaraja Math and Raghavendra Math. Out of these three mathas, Uttaradi Math is the largest.

First bifurcation

During the times of Vidyadhiraja Tirtha (successor of Jayatirtha) the first bifurcation of the main matha took place. Main Matha continued in the lineage of Kavindra Tirtha (a disciple of Vidyadhiraja Tirtha) as Uttaradi Matha to spread Tattvavada (Dvaita) in the Northern part of Karnataka and beyond. At the same time, Rajendra Tirtha (a disciple of Vidyadhiraja Tirtha) established "Poorvadi Matha", which is now known by the name of Vyasaraja Math to spread Tattvavada (Dvaita) in the Southern parts of Karnataka and beyond until Tamil Nadu.

Second bifurcation

The second bifurcation of the main matha took place during the times of Ramachandra Tirtha. Initially, ashrama was given to Vibudendra Tirtha by Ramachandra Tirtha, and even named as his successor. It is not known what happened but Vibudendra Tirtha couldn't return from the pilgrimage tour during Ramachandra Tirtha's last phase of life. So Ramachandra Tirtha chose to initiate another pontiff and named him "Vidyanidhi Tirtha" and declared him as his successor. Vibudendra Tirtha returned from the pilgrimage tour after the death of Ramachandra Tirtha. Hence two mathas were established. Uttaradi Matha continued in the lineage of Vidyanidhi Tirtha and the other matha was formed by Vibudendra Tirtha. It was known as "Dakshinadi Matha" or "Kumbakona Matha (which is now known by the name of Raghavendra Matha). These lineages were formed and continued for the benefit of the Madhva philosophy so that more and more individuals consequently have access to the philosophy and get Upadeśa (spiritual guidance).

According to Surendranath Dasgupta, Uttaradi Math was divided twice, and so we end up with three mathas, the other two being Vyasaraja Math and Raghavendra Math.

Uttaradi Math, along with Vyasaraja Math and Raghavendra Math, is considered to be the three premier apostolic institutions of Dvaita Vedanta and are jointly referred as Mathatraya. It is the pontiffs and pandits of the Mathatraya that have been the principal architects of post-Madhva Dvaita Vedanta through the centuries. Among the mathas outside of Tulu Nadu region, Uttaradi Matha is the largest.

== Pontifical lineage ==
=== Origin ===

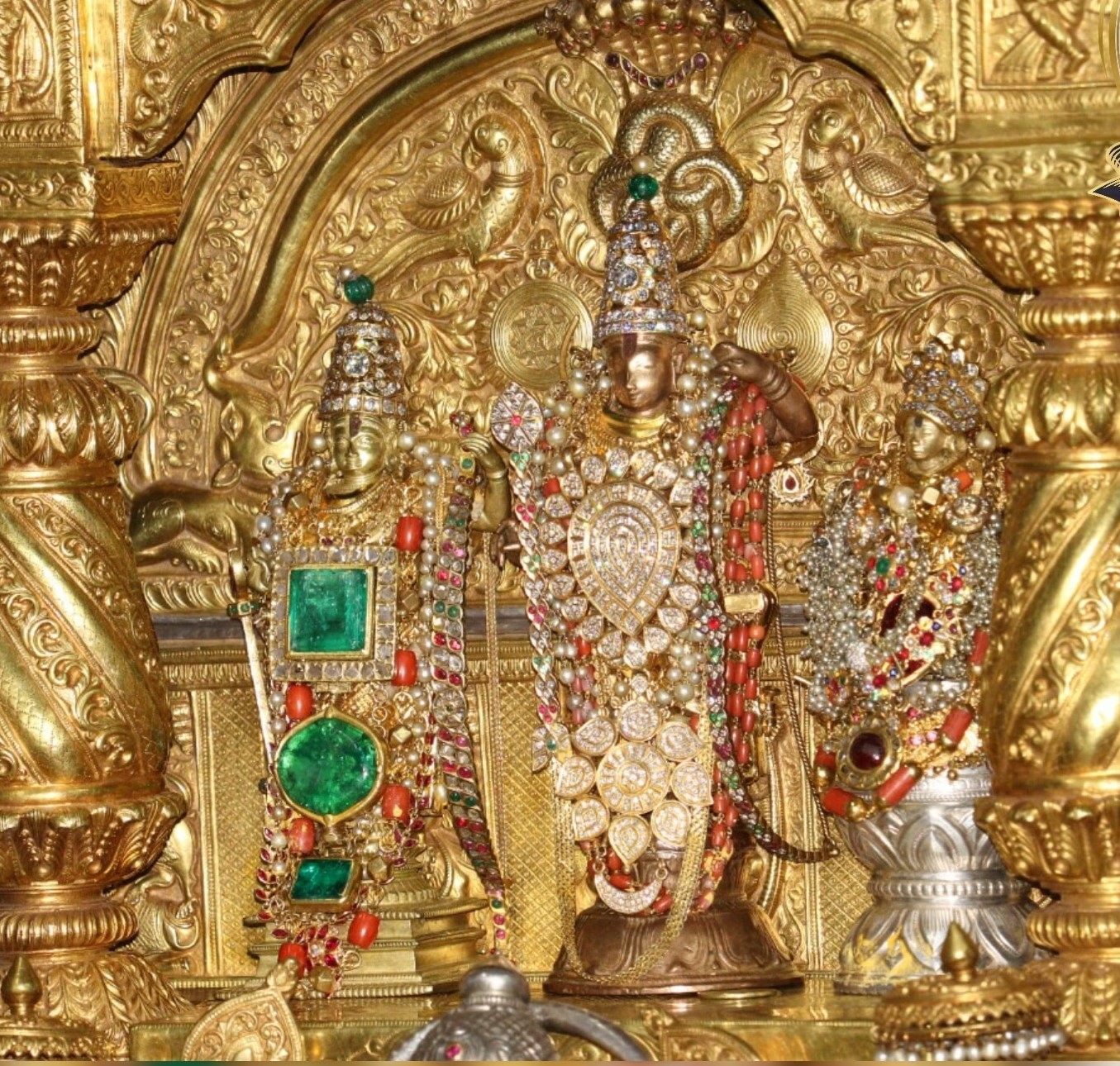
Digvijaya Rama, Moola Rama and Moola Sita Devi deities worshipped in the lineage of Uttaradi Matha.

As per authoritative Hindu scriptures, "The Supreme God also wanted to bless the souls with divine knowledge, by which they can attain salvation. For this purpose, the Supreme God — Śrī Nārāyana Himself incarnated as Śrī Hamsa and adorned the pontifical seat called the Hamsa-Pīṭha."

Indian anthropologists Surajit Sinha and Baidyanath Saraswati says that:

The Uttaradi Math is age-old. Tradition claims it to have originated from the Hamsa of Bhagwata otherwise called Uttara and to have continued its existence all through the dim pre-historic past right up to the middle of the 13th century when Madhvacharya, the Supreme pre-eminent Exponent of Dvaita philosophy, brought it to the limelight and gave it the present organizational shape.

=== List of aacharyas ===
The complete list of (pithadhipati/ācāryas who had taken the seat of this math is as below: This list represents the authorized guru-paramparā (disciplic succession) of Śrī Uttaradi Math till date.

- Śrī Haṁsa (A name of The Supreme Person/Supreme Godhead, Śrī Nārāyaṇa or Śrī Hari; Paramātmā)
- Śrī Brahmā
- Śrī Sanakādi
- Śrī Dūrvāsā
- Śrī Jñāna-nidhi Tīrtha
- Śrī Garuḍa-vāhana Tīrtha
- Śrī Kaivalya Tīrtha
- Śrī Jñāneśa Tīrtha
- Śrī Para Tīrtha
- Śrī Satya-prajña Tīrtha
- Śrī Prājña Tīrtha
- Śrī Acyuta-prekṣa Tīrtha or Acyuta-Prājña Tīrtha

The list of Pithadhipatis beginning from Madhvācārya
Sr.	Name	Reign Began C.E. (Note: These dates are based on B. N. K. Sharma's book, A History of the Dvaita School of Vedānta and Its Literature)	Reign Ended C.E. (Note: These dates are based on B. N. K. Sharma's book, A History of the Dvaita School of Vedānta and Its Literature)	Brindavana (Note: Brindavana refers to sacred burial places in the tradition of Uttaradi Matha.)	Purvashrama name (Note: Purvashrama name refers to the name of the Peetadhipathi before taking Sannyasa.)	Portrait
1	Jagadguru Śrī Madhvācārya (Śrī Pūrnaprajña Tīrtha or Śrīmad-Ānanda Tīrtha Bhagavat-pādācārya)	1238	1317	-	Vasudeva	
2	Śrī Padmanābha Tīrtha	1317	1324	Nava Brindavana, Hampi	Shobhana Bhatta	
3	Śrī Nṛhari Tīrtha	1324	1333	Venkatapura, Hampi	Shyama Shastri	
4	Śrī Mādhava Tīrtha	1333	1350	Mannuru	Vishnu Shastri	
5	Śrī Akṣhobhya Tīrtha	1350	1365	Malkheda	Govinda Shastri	
6	Śrī Jaya Tīrtha	1365	1388	Malkheda	Dhondupant Raghunath	
7	Śrī Vidyādhirāja Tīrtha	1388	1392	Puri (but not found still)	Krishna Bhatt	
8	Śrī Kavīndra Tīrtha	1392	1398	Nava Brindavana, Hampi	Vishnudasacharya	
9	Śrī Vāgīśa Tīrtha	1398	1406	Nava Brindavana, Hampi	Raghunathacharya	
10	Śrī Rāmacandra Tīrtha	1406	1435	Yaragola	Madhava Shastri	
11	Śrī Vidyā-nidhi Tīrtha	1435	1442	Yaragola	Krishtacharya	
12	Śrī Raghunātha Tīrtha	1442	1502	Malakheda	Vishnu Shastri	
13	Śrī Raghuvarya Tīrtha	1502	1535	Nava Brindavana, Hampi	Ramachandra Shastri	
14	Śrī Raghūttama Tīrtha	1535	1596	Tirukoilur	Ramachandra Bhatta	
15	Śrī Veda-vyāsa Tīrtha	1596	1619	Penugonda	Anantha Vyasacharya	
16	Śrī Vidyā-dhīśa Tīrtha	1619	1631	Ranebennur	Pandurangi Narasimhacharya	
17	Śrī Vedanidhi Tīrtha	1635	1638	Pandarpur	Koratagi Pradyumnacharya	
18	Śrī Satya-vrata Tīrtha	1631	1635	Sangli	Raghunathacharya	
19	Śrī Satya-nidhi Tīrtha	1638	1660	Kurnool	Kauligi Raghunathacharya	
20	Śrī Satya-nātha Tīrtha	1660	1673	Veeracholapuram	Narashimacharya	
21	Śrī Satyābhinava Tīrtha	1673	1706	Nachiarkoil, Kumbhakonam	Kesavacharya	
22	Śrī Satya-pūrṇa Tīrtha	1706	1726	Kolpur (near Raichur)	Kolhapur Krishnacharya	
23	Śrī Satya-vijaya Tīrtha	1726	1737	Satya Vijaya Nagaram	Pandurangi Balacharya	
24	Śrī Satya-priya Tīrtha	1737	1744	Manamadurai	Garlapad Ramacharya	
25	Śrī Satya-bodha Tīrtha	1744	1783	Savanur	Raichur Ramacharya	
26	Śrī Satya-sandha Tīrtha	1783	1794	Mahishi Thirthahalli, Shivamogga Dist.	Haveri Ramacharya	
27	Śrī Satya-vara Tīrtha	1794	1797	Santebidanur	Haveri Krishnacharya	
28	Śrī Satya-dharma Tīrtha	1797	1830	Holehonnur near Shivamogga, Koodli	Navaratna Purushottamacharya	
29	Śrī Satya-saṅkalpa Tīrtha	1830	1841	Mysore	Navaratna Shrinivasacharya	
30	Śrī Satya-santuṣṭa Tīrtha	3 July 1841	12 March 1842	Mysore	Navaratna Balacharya (Guli Balacharya)	
31	Śrī Satya-parāyaṇa Tīrtha	1842	1863	Santebiddanur	Haveri Gururayacharya	
32	Śrī Satya-kāma Tīrtha	1863	1871	Athakuru	Pachapura Srinivasacharya	
33	Śrī Satyeṣṭa Tīrtha	1871	1872	Athakuru	Hattimuttur Narasimhacharya	
34	Śrī Satya-parākrama Tīrtha	1872	1879	Chittapura	Vykar Srinivasacharya	
35	Śrī Satya-vīra Tīrtha	1879	1886	Korlahalli	Korlahalli Bhodaramacharya	
36	Śrī Satya-dhīra Tīrtha	1886	1906	Korlahalli	Korlahalli Jayaacharya	
37	Śrī Satya-jñāna Tīrtha	1906	1911	Rajahmundry	Kinhal Jayacharya	
38	Śrī Satya-dhyāna Tīrtha	1911	24 March 1942	Pandarpur	Korlahalli Sethuramacharya	
39	Śrī Satya-prajña Tīrtha	24 March 1942	14 April 1945	Athakuru	Pandurangi Jayacharya	
40	Śrī Satyābhijña Tīrtha	14 April 1945	2 February 1948	Ranebennur	Katti Venkannacharya	
41	Śrī Satya-pramoda Tīrtha	2 February 1948	3 November 1997	Tirukoilur	Guttal Gururajacharya	
42	Śrī Satyātma Tīrtha (the current presiding pontiff)	3 November 1997	till date (Note: Sannyasa accepted on: 24 April 1996))	-	Guttal Sarvajnāchārya	

=== Followers ===
Authors Surajit Sinha and Baidyanath Saraswati says, "An overwhelming majority of Madhvas, widely scattered all over India owes its allegiance to the Uttaradi Matha". Most of the Deshastha Madhvas of Maharashtra, Madhya Pradesh and South India, and the whole Gayawal Brahmin community of Bihar are followers of this Matha. In Karnataka, Majority of Madhvas in the districts of Bijapur, Belgaum, Dharwad, Kalaburagi (Gulbarga), Gadag, Raichur, Bagalkote, Haveri, Shivamogga, Bidar, Vijayanagara, Hassan, Chikmagalur and Mysore are followers of this matha. Scholar B. N. K. Sharma says, Majority of Madhvas in Andhra Pradesh, Telangana, northern Karnataka and Maharashtra are followers of Uttaradi Matha. Sharma says in Maharashtra, followers of Uttaradi Math are spread in the districts of Kolhapur, Sholapur, Satara, Pune, Nasik and Ahmednagar. According to Times of India, there are more than 2 lakh followers of Uttaradi Math in Pune city alone. Sharma says all the Thanjavur Marathi Deshastha Brahmins of Madhva Sampradaya, who migrated from Bombay-Karnataka region and Maharashtra to Thanjavur and old Mysore State when Maratha rulers occupied Thanjavur were all followers of Uttaradi Math. Sharma even says Deshastha Madhva Brahmins in former Hyderabad State are all followers of Uttaradi Math.

== Vidyapeethas and organizations ==
The Sri Matha has established many Vidyapeethas most prominent among them being Sri Jayateertha Vidyapeetha in Bangalore and Sri Satyadhyana Vidyapeetha in Mumbai (Old Hindu Style Gurukuls) with boarding facilities where in students stay and continue their study in Vedas and Madhwa Shastras. Students are rigorously trained here in various branches of knowledge like Grammar, Linguistics, Logic, Mimamsa, Sankhya, Yoga, Veda, Jyotisha, Advaita, Vishistadvaita and Dvaita systems and Modern Philosophies.

=== Sri Jayateertha Vidyapeetha ===
Indian Author and Scholar Radhavallabh Tripathi says, "Sri Jayateertha Vidyapeetha was established by Sri Satyapramoda Tīrtha Swamiji in the year 1989, which presently holds more than 200 students and 15 teaching faculty members". The uniqueness of this institution is that its students are specially trained under the guidance of Shri 1008 Shri Satyatma Teertha Swamiji for 12 years with initial 9 years of training at the Jayateertha Vidyapeetha Residential Campus where they attain mastery over Kāvya, Vyākaraṇa, Sahitya, Vedas, Sankhya, Yoga, Jaina, Bauddha, Shakta, Advaita, Vishistadvaita and Dvaita Philosophies under the guidance of Kulapati (chancellor) Guttala Rangacharya, Principal Vidwan Satyadhyanacharya and several other experienced Adhyapakas. During the last 3 years of the course, the students are given extensive classes in Shriman Nyaya Sudha, Tatparya Chandrika, Tarkatandava etc., on tour directly by the learned Swamiji, thus giving the student an opportunity to expand his knowledge base by way of getting exposed, at an early age, to the scholarly world, with the opportunity to meet several esteemed scholars and conducting debates and discussions with them in esteemed centres of learning across the entire country like Kashi, Prayag, Delhi, Pune, Rajahmundry etc. After successfully completing the 12-year course, the students are awarded the title "Sudha Vidwan" in a grand convocation function called the "Sudha Mangala", held at various prime centres of learning. To make themselves eligible for the title the students have to present a paper orally before distinguished scholars and also take an oral exam in Shriman Nyaya Sudha, the magnum opus of Dvaita Philosophy. The candidate is tested for all-round skills and then declared to be eligible for the title by a jury of scholars headed by Satyatma Tirtha.

=== Sri Satyadhyana Vidyapeetha ===
Satyadhyana Vidyapeetha was founded in the year 1956 in Matunga, Mumbai by Gopalacharya Ramacharya Mahuli, a disciple of Satyadhyana Tirtha. Satyadhyana Vidyapeetha is an institution of advanced learning. It caters for the needs of scholars interested in higher studies and research. By 1972, It has brought out 26 authoritative volumes on philosophy. Mahuli Vidyasimhacharya is the present Kulapathi of Satyadhyana Vidyapeetha, now located in Mulund, Mumbai.

=== Vishwa Madhwa Maha Parishat ===
Satyatma Tirtha Maharaj the present Peetadhipathi of Uttaradi Math founded Vishwa Madhwa Maha Parishat, a non-profit, religious and social organization in 1998. Thousands of books have been published so far by the Vishwa Madhwa Maha Parishat. Every year a 5-day All India Madhwa Convention is held in Dharwad under the leadership of Satyatma Tirtha Swamiji, Vishwa Madhwa Maha Parishat and Vishwa Madhwa Manahandal, featuring discourses and debates on Nyaya, Tarka, Mimamsa, Dasa literature. Pontiffs of all Madhva Mathas grace the occasion. Every year, more than 1 lakh devotees attend the congregation.

== See also ==
- Satyatma Tirtha
- Dvaita Vedanta
- Dvaita literature
- Ashta Mathas of Udupi
- Paryaya
- Mathatraya of Tattvavada

== Bibliography ==
- Sharma, B. N. Krishnamurti (2000). A History of the Dvaita School of Vedānta and Its Literature, Vol 1. 3rd Edition. Motilal Banarsidass (2008 Reprint). ISBN 978-8120815759.
- Rao, C. R. (1984). Srimat Uttaradi Mutt: Moola Maha Samsthana of Srimadjagadguru Madhvacharya.
- Rao, Vasudeva (2002). Living Traditions in Contemporary Contexts: The Madhva Matha of Udupi. Orient Blackswan. ISBN 978-8125022978.
- Sharma, B. N. Krishnamurti (1962). Philosophy of Śrī Madhvācārya. Motilal Banarsidass (2014 Reprint). ISBN 978-8120800687.
- Karnataka State Gazetteer: Bijapur District (Bagalkot District Included), Karnataka Gazetteer Department, 2006
- Glasenapp, Helmuth von (1992). Madhva's Philosophy of the Viṣṇu Faith. Dvaita Vedanta Studies and Research Foundation.
- O. P. Bhatnnagar (1964). Studies in social history: modern India. University of Allahabad.
- Naqvī, Ṣādiq; Rao, V. Kishan (2005). A Thousand Laurels--Dr. Sadiq Naqvi: Studies on Medieval India with Special Reference to Deccan, Volume 2. Department of Ancient Indian History, Culture & Archaeology, Osmania University.
- Tripathi, Radhavallabh (2012). Ṣaṣṭyabdasaṃskr̥tam: India. Rashtriya Sanskrit Sansthan. ISBN 9788124606292.
