= Raghavendra Math (Mantralayam) =

Hindu monastery in India

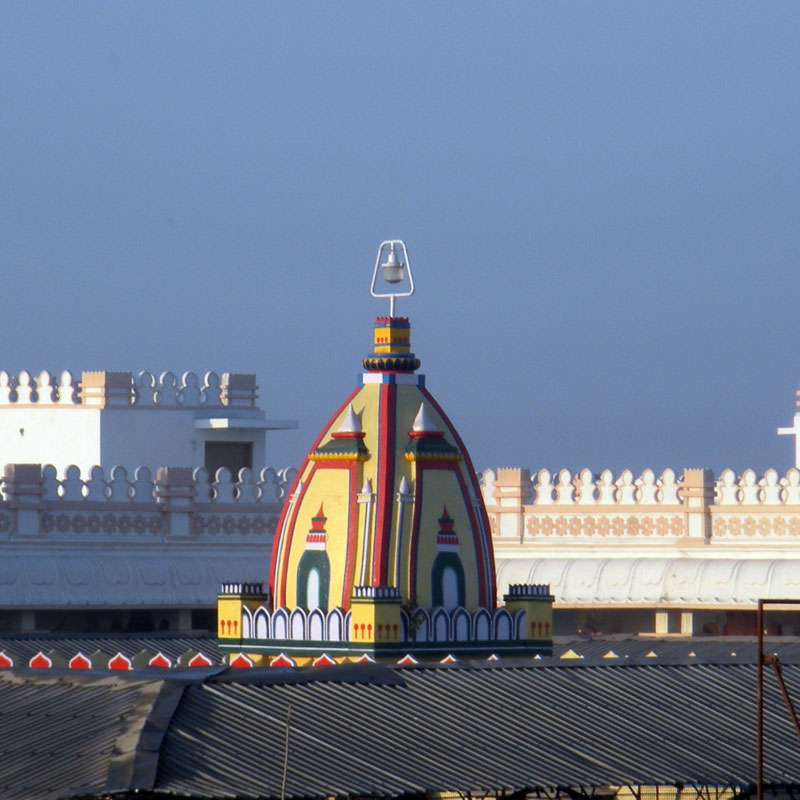
Sri Raghavendra Swamy Mutt, Mantralayam

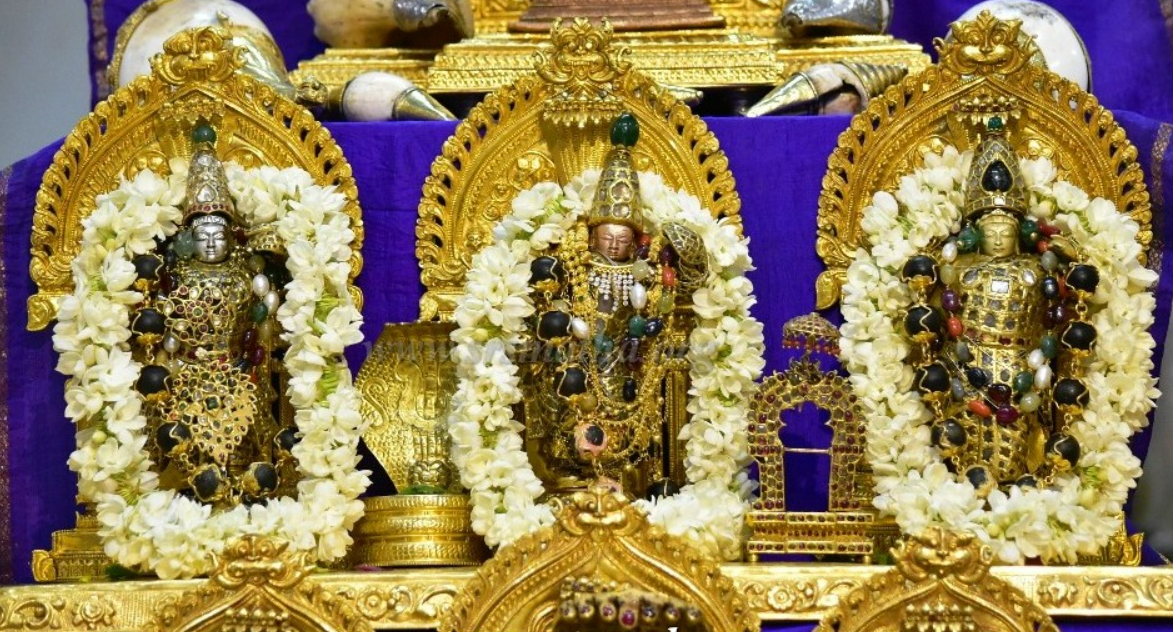
Sri Moola rama, Digvijaya rama and Jayarama Idols at Raghavendra Math

Sri Raghavendra Swamy Mutt, Mantralayam is one of the Dvaita Vedanta monasteries (Matha) descended from Madhvacharya through Sri Jayatirtha further with Vibudhendra Tirtha (a disciple of Ramchandra Tirtha). It is one of the three premier monasteries descended in the lineage of Jayatirtha the other two being Uttaradi Math and Vyasaraja Math and are jointly referred as Mathatraya(ಮಠತ್ರಯ). It is the pontiffs and pandits of the Mathatraya that have been the principal architects of post-Madhva Dvaita Vedanta through the centuries.

Ramachandra Tirtha's disciples are Vidyanidhi Tirtha and Vibhudendra Tirtha. Vidyanidhi Tirtha continued in the lineage of Uttaradi Matha and Vibhudendra Tirtha established Dakshinadi Matha in Kumbhakonam. These lineages were formed and continued for the benefit of the Madhva philosophy so that more and more individuals consequently have access to the philosophy and get Upadeśa (spiritual guidance). Later this matha came to be known by the name of Kumbhakona Matha. After the times of famous Vijayendra Tirtha it came to be known as Vijayendra Math. Post the period of Sri Subodhendra Tirtha (1799 - 1835) the mutt was stationed at Nanjanagud, hence it is also known as Nanjanagud Sri Raghavendra Swamy Mutt in later days. In recent decades, the mutt has established its headquarters at Mantralayam. It is the holy abode of Sri Raghavendra teertha (1621 - 1671) who is one of the prominent personalities in the lineage of Madhvacharya. Sri Raghavendra Swami Mutt (the temple and monastery surrounding the burial site of Sri Raghavendra Teertha) is located on the bank of Tungabhadra River in Mantralayam in Adoni taluk of Kurnool district in Andhra Pradesh, India.

== History ==
Raghavendra Math is descended from Jagadguru Shri Madhvacharya through Vibhudendra Tirtha and came to existence in 15th century. The Raghavendra Math was founded in 15th century by Vibhudendra Tirtha in Kumbhakonam. So, earlier the matha was known as Kumbhakonam Matha or Dakshinadi Math and later the matha was made popular as Sri Vijayendra Mutt after Vijayendra Tirtha by Sudhindra Tirtha, a disciple and successor to the pontificate of Kumbakonam Matha. After Sudhindra Tirtha his disciple, the most venerated dvaita saint Raghavendra Tirtha continued in the pontifical lineage as the pontiff of the matha.

Deities worshipped

The Moola Rama is the main deity of the matha. Along with Mool Rama, Sri Digvijaya Rama (Worshipped by Sri Madhvacharya) and Jaya Rama (worshipped by Sri Jayateertha) are being worshipped at Sri Raghavendra Swamy Mutt. Two Vyasamushtis, Sri Shodasha bahu Narasimha worshipped by Sri Vibudhendra teertha and Santana Gopala Krishna, Vaikuntha Vasudeva, Vitthala and other prominent deities with significant historical importance are worshipped in the mutt.

Purandara Dasa has meaningfully described the worship of Moolarama performed by his contemporary Yatishwara Srisurendratirtha. Sri Gopala Dasa mentions Vasudhendratirtha eight times in Moolarama's Suladi called 'Taranikulotpanna Taputakanchanavarna'. Sri Jagannath Dasa composed kirtans on many Yativarenyas of Sri Raghavendra Math, quoting Moolaram. He also dearly mentions his beloved guru Sri Raghavendra teertha. He also describes the Moola rama as beloved god of Vasudhendra teertha̤.

== Guru Parampara ==
The Guru Parampara (Lineage of Saints) of Sri Raghavendra Swamy Mutt is given below.

1. Sri Madhvacharya
2. Sri Padmanabha Tirtha
3. Sri Narahari Tirtha
4. Sri Madhava Tirtha
5. Sri Akshobhya Tirtha
6. Sri Jayatirtha
7. Sri Vidyadhiraja Tirtha
8. Sri Kavindra Thirtha
9. Sri Vaageesha Thirtha
10. Sri Ramachandra Tirtha
11. Sri Vibudhendra Tirtha
12. Sri Jitamitra Tirtha
13. Sri Raghunandana Tirtha
14. Sri Surendra Tirtha
15. Sri Vijayeendra Tirtha
16. Sri Sudhindra Tirtha
17. Sri Raghavendra Tirtha
18. Sri Yogeendra Tirtha
19. Sri Sooreendra Tirtha
20. Sri Sumateendra Tirtha
21. Sri Upendra Tirtha
22. Sri Vadeendra Tirtha
23. Sri Vasudhendra Tirtha
24. Sri Varadendra Tirtha
25. Sri Dheerendra Tirtha
26. Sri Bhuvanendra Tirtha
27. Sri Subodhendra Tirtha
28. Sri Sujanendra Tirtha
29. Sri Sujnanendra Tirtha
30. Sri Sudharmendra Tirtha
31. Sri Sugunendra Tirtha
32. Sri Suprajnendra Tirtha
33. Sri Sukrutheendra Tirtha
34. Sri Susheelendra Tirtha
35. Sri Suvrateendra Tirtha
36. Sri Suyameendra Tirtha
37. Sri Sujayeendra Tirtha
38. Sri Sushameendra Tirtha
39. Sri Suvidyendra Tirtha
40. Sri Suyateendra Tirtha
41. Sri Subudhendra Tirtha – (Present Pontiff)

== Bibliography ==
- Sharma, B. N. Krishnamurti (2000). A History of the Dvaita School of Vedānta and Its Literature, Vol 1. 3rd Edition. Motilal Banarsidass (2008 Reprint). ISBN 978-8120815759.
