= Nava Brindavana =

Hindu shrine in Karnataka, India

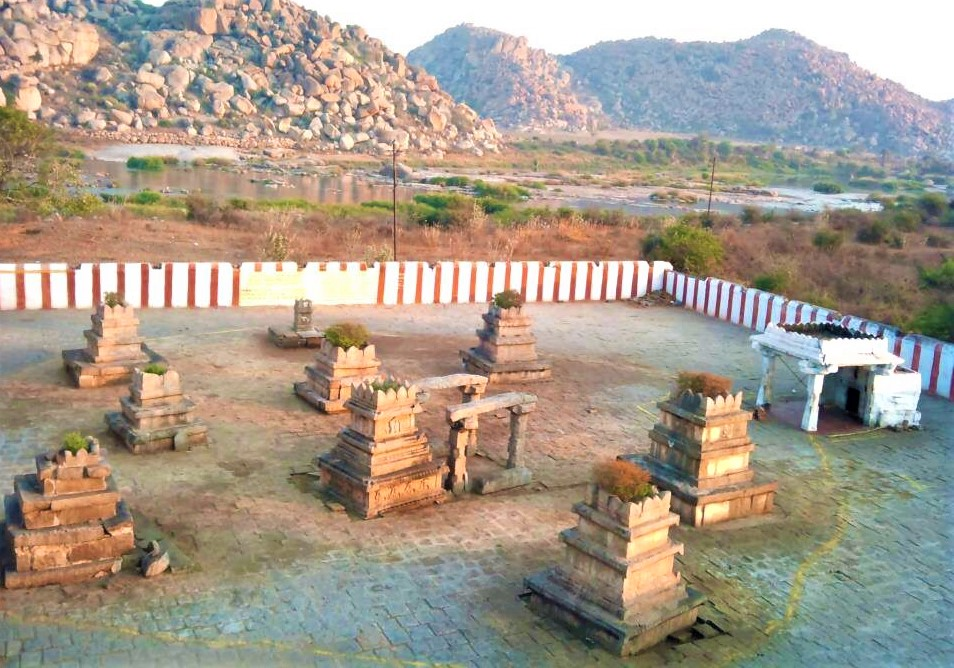
Top view of Brindavana's (tombs) of the nine famous Madhva saints — Nava Brindavan.

Nava Brindavana (also known as Navavrundhaavana; Kannada:ನವ ಬೃಂದಾವನ) is located on an island in the Tungabhadra River at Anegundi, near Hampi, Karnataka, India. The Brindavanas of nine Hindu Madhva saints present in Nava Brindavana belongs to Uttaradi Math, Vyasaraja Math, and Raghavendra Math. All these saints are descended from Padmanabha Tirtha, direct disciple of Jagadguru Madhvacharya.

== List of Saints in Nava Brindavana ==
The nine saints in Nava Brindavana are as follows:

1. Padmanabha Tirtha, direct disciple of Jagadguru Shri Madhvacharya
2. Kavindra Tirtha
3. Vagisha Tirtha
4. Vyasatirtha
5. Srinivasa Tirtha
6. Ramatirtha
7. Raghuvarya Tirtha, Guru of Tirukouilur Shri Raghuttama Tirtha
8. Sudhindra Tirtha, Guru of Mantralaya Shri Raghavendra Tirtha
9. Govinda Wodeyar

There are also shrines to Lord Ranganatha and Lord Hanuman inside the premises.

== History ==
Nava Brindavana is located in Angundi which was earlier part of Kishkindha, a mythological kingdom ruled by Sugriva. In Ramayana, when Raama and Lakshmana were in search of Seeta, Raama pointed out an island (called 'Navabrundhaavana' now) to Lakshmana and suggested to him to perform Namaskaara on the island, as it would be a sacred place in the future when nine powerful saints born on different occasions would come down to stay there to perform their holy meditation.

=== Overview of Nava Brindavana ===
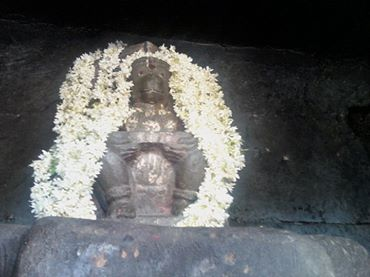
Powerful Avathaarathraya Hanuman at Navabrindhavan

Nava Brindavana is a small island in the Tungabhadra river near Hampi or Vijayanagar. This is one of the holiest spots for Madhwas as it contains the Brindavanas (the final resting place of nine Madhwa saints). The Brindavana of Vyasatirtha is at the centre while the Brindavanas of the other eight saints are in a rough circle. In order to maintain peace and politeness around the Jeevasamaadhi of the nine shrines, a yellow circle is painted on the ground in front of the shrines. The pilgrims are not allowed to cross this line to avoid disturbing the meditation of the holy saints. Along with the Brindavanas, there are also shrines dedicated to Lord Ranganatha (a form of Lord Vishnu) and Hanuman here. This idol of Hanuman installed here by Sri Vyasaraja is indeed unique. It depicts the three avatars - Hanuma, Bheema, and Madhva in one form. The face is like Hanuman, the arms and shoulders well-rounded and muscular with the Gadhayudha symbolise Bheema, the avatar of Hanuman in the next yuga and the manuscripts in his hand symbolise Madhvacharya.

Padmanabha Tirtha

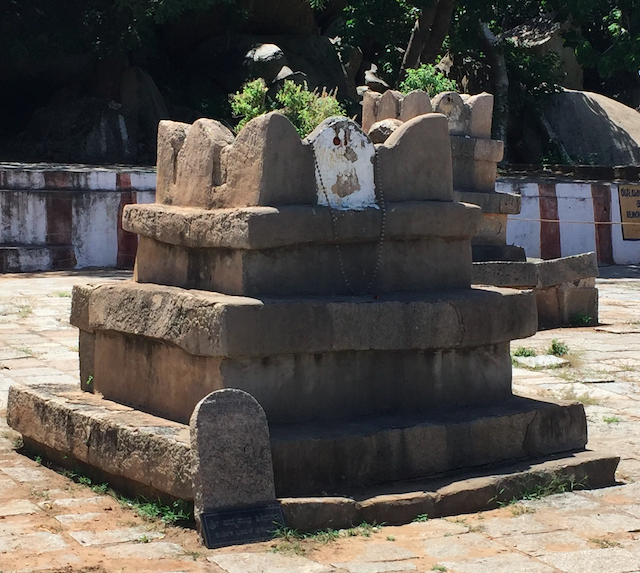
Sri Padmanabha Tirtha Mahaswamiji Brindavana at Nava Brindavana.

Padmanabha Tirtha is the first saint to enter Brindavana at Nava Brindavana. Padmanabha Theertha was a direct disciple of the Madhvacharya, who ascended over the Dvaita throne after Madhvacharya. His original name was Shobana Bhatta. He was a well-known logician of his times and he lost a marathon debate to Madhvacharya after which he converted to Dvaitaism.

Kavindra Tirtha

The second Brindavana here is that of Kavindra Tirtha. He is believed to be the brother of Rajendra Tirtha of Vyasaraja Matha. His original name was Vasudeva Shastri before entering sannyasa ashrama. The first bifurcation of the Padmanabha Tirtha paramapara or Peetha took place when Vidyadhiraja Tirtha handed over the reins to Kavindra Tirtha. Vidhyadhiraja Tirtha had appointed Rajendra Tirtha as his successor, but Vidhyadhiraja fell ill and he could not get in touch with Rajendra Tirtha as he was away on Sanchara (tour). Vidhyadhiraja then appointed Kavindra Tirtha as the successor and died. When Rajendra Tirtha came back he found what had happened and he travelled further south towards Mysore and founded Vyasaraja Matha. Kavindra Tirtha continued to reign in the Peetha of the already established Matha/Peetha by Shri Madhvacharya through Shri Padmanabha Tirtha which is known as Shri Raghavendra Swamy matha which comes in the same lineage as that of Shri Madhvacharya, Padmanabha tirtha, Jayatirtha, Kaveendra Tirtha & Vageesha Tirtha and so on. Kavindra Tirtha entered Brindavana in 1398. His Aradhana Thithi is Chaitra Shudha Navami (April–May).

Vagisha Tirtha

Vagisha Tirtha (Note: Not to be confused with the Vageesha Theertha of Sode Mutt who was the deeksha guru of Shree Vadhiraja, and revered respectfully by the latter in his Theertha Prabandha.) was the successor of Kavindra Tirtha to Madhvacharya Peetha - Shri Raghavendra Swamy matha. His Poorvashrama name was Raghunathacharya. He was one of the greatest scholars of his time. He was the third saint to enter Brindavana at Nava Brindavana. He entered Brindavana sometime in 1406. His Aradhana Thithi is Chaitra Krishna Tritiya (April–May).

Raghuvarya Tirtha

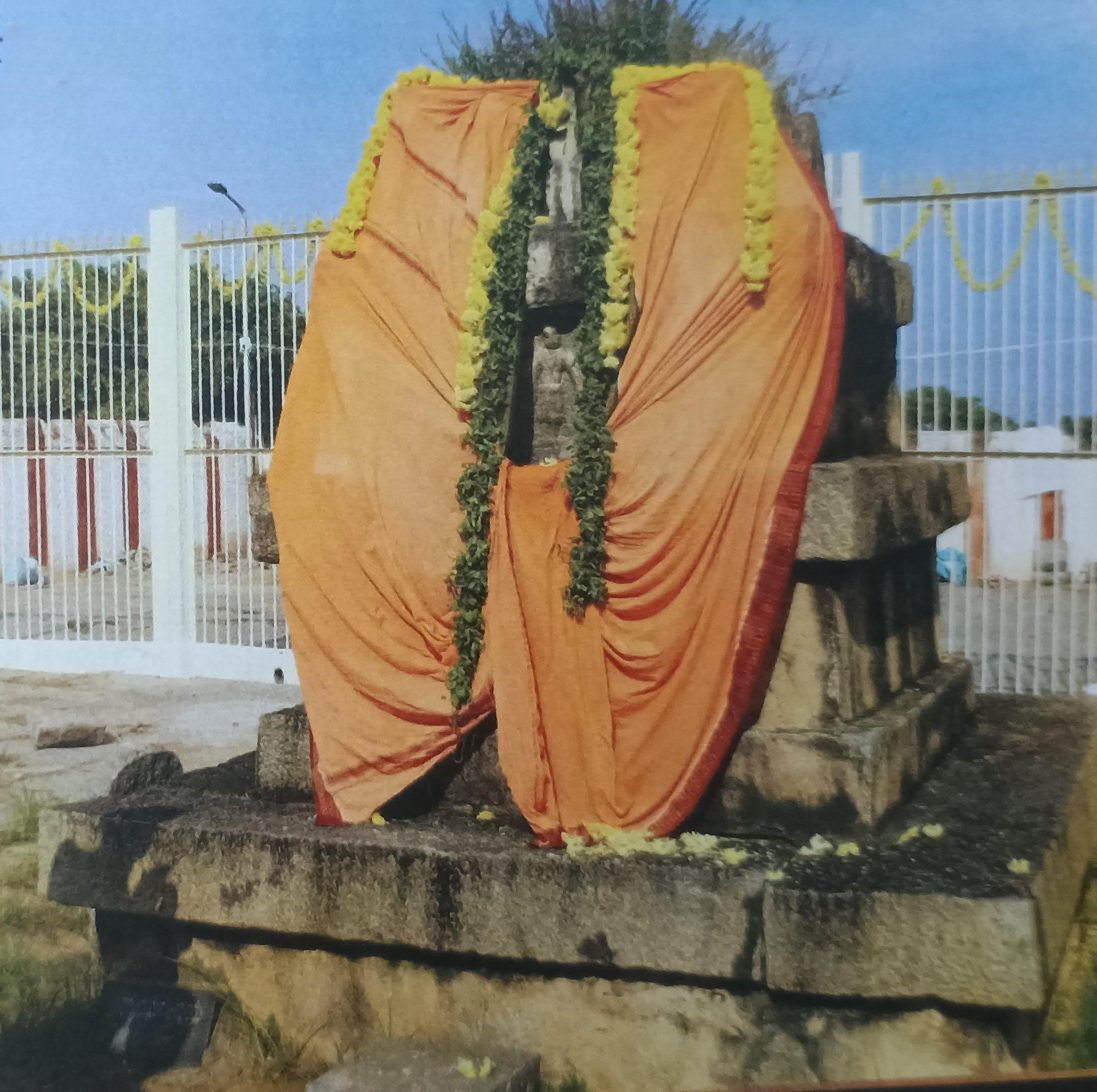
Sri Raghuvarya Tirtha Mahaswamiji Brindavana at Nava Brindavana.

Shri Raghuvarya Teertha took over the responsibility of the Uttaradi Matha and ruled the pontificate throne with great spiritual eminence. It is said that once during the course of his polemical tour, he came to a village called Manipur near the bank of Bhimarathi river, which was besieged by a king. His Holiness wanted to leave the place and go to the other side of the river Bhimarathi. He carried the puja box on his shoulders and reached the bank of the river. At once, the river Bhimarathi halved and gave way to HH to reach the other side of the river. Swamiji crossed the river with his disciples safely and the river regained its original form. All the disciples were struck with wonder on observing HH's mystic power .

This incident can be compared to the river Yamuna which gave way to Vasudeva carrying his child Lord Shri Krishna to reach gokula. Shri Raghuvarya Teertha travelled all over the country on foot like his guru. When he was in the northern tour, one day Shri Moola Rama appeared in a dream of Swamiji and announced that the god Niruti was going to be born in the village called "Swarnavadi" and that child should be brought up at the Matha who would succeed Shri Raghuvarya Teertha in the

Vyasa Tirtha

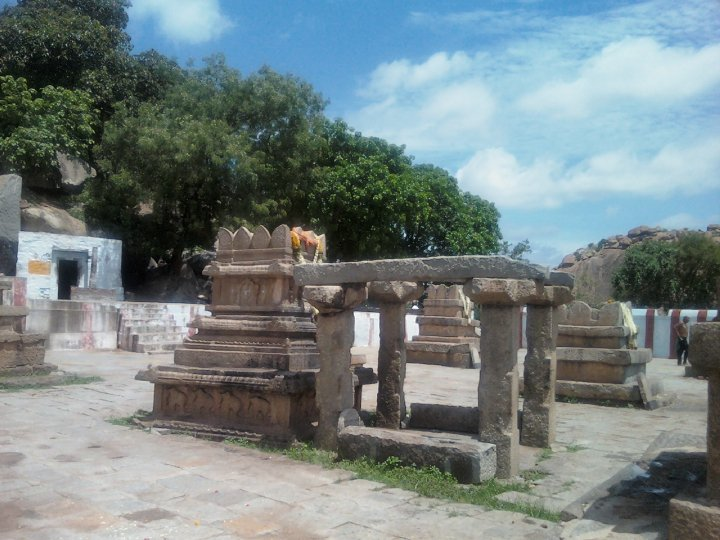
Vyasaraja Theertha Shrine

A renowned scholar, Vyasa Theertha or Vyasa Raja was the Raja Guru of six Vijayanagar Emperors, including Krishnadevaraya. He had a large number of disciples including Vadiraja Tirtha. He encouraged Purandara Dasa and Kanaka Dasa in penning Haridasa Sahitya. He was the Chancellor of the Vijayanagar University which had 11,000 students. He consecrated 732 idols of Hanuman in India. His guru was Brahamanya Theertha of Abbur, while his Vidya Guru was Sripadaraja of Mulabagal. His works are considered to be among the most significant in Madhwa literature. Some of his notable works include Nyayamrita, Tarkatandava, and Tatparya Chandrika. He entered Brindavana in 1539 when Achyuta Deva Raya was the Emperor of Vijayanagar.

Srinivasa Tirtha

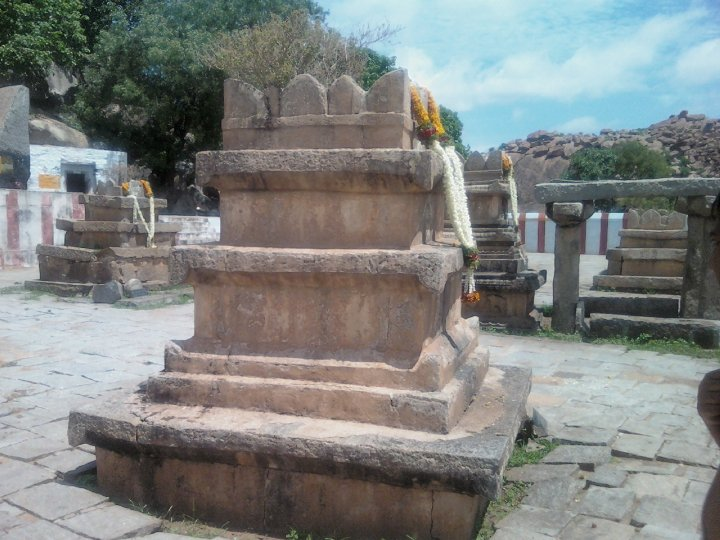
Srinivasa Theertha

Srinivasa Tirtha succeeded Vyasa Tirtha to the Vyasaraja Matha. He was also the Rajaguru of Achyuta Deve Raya. He has written a book on Vyasatirtha. This book along with accounts of Portuguese travelers to Vijayanagar and a biography by Somanatha, a Smartha Brahmin during the period of Krishna Deve Raya, give us a lot of information about Vyasa Raja.

Ramatirtha

Ramatirtha followed Srinivasa Theertha to the Peetha of Vyasaraja Matha. It was during the period of Ramatirtha that the first split of the Vyasaraja Matha took place. Both Lakshmikantha Tirtha and Sridhara Tirtha took Sanyasa from Rama Tirtha. Thus the Abbur Matha or Kundapur Matha and Sosale Matha came into existence. In Bangalore, the Abbur Matha has its premises in Hanumanthnagar and the Sosale Matha at Gandhi Bazar.

Sudhindra Tirtha

Sudhindra Tirtha was the guru of Shri Raghavendra Swamy. He was also the “Shishya” given to Vijayeendra Theertha by Vyasa Raja himself. He was an unmatched scholar and he shared a close relationship with Vijayeendra Theertha. Some of the books written by him are: Sadukthi Rathnakara (Tarkathandava Vyakhya), Apastamba Shulbasootrapradepa, Commentary on second and 11th Skandas of Bhagavatha Literary Books, Subhadra Parinaya, Vyasarajabhyudaya, Amruthaharana, Dayalu Shathaka, Vairagyatharanga, Alankara Manjaree, Alankaranishaka and Sahitya Samrajya. He was the Rajaguru of Raghunatha Bhoopala of Tanjore. His Aradhana Thithi is Phalguna Krishna Dvithiya (Feb-March).

Govinda Wodeyar

Govinda Wodeyar, who was an Advaiti pontiff converted to Dvaita faith after being defeated by Vyasatirtha in a debate. Govinda Wodeyar after taking Vaishnava diksha also served the dasa parampare with many krutees in the form of sulaadees with the ankita “muddukrishna”. He entered Brindavana 5 years prior to Vyasartirtha in Navavrundavana in 1534 AD on Phalguna Krishna panchami day.

== Vandalism Incident ==
Miscreants vandalized the Vyasaraja thirtha brindavana on 18 July 2019. Quick reconstruction efforts were carried out by hundreds of volunteers of the madhva community and state of karnataka. Later, police arrested inter state thieves within 3 days who accepted their fault of vandalizing

== Administration and Visit ==
Nava Brindavana is on an island. There are no priests permanently stationed there. The priests stay at the Madhva Mathas at Anegundi. Every day, at 7 am, a boat from Anegundi ferries the priests to Nava Brindavana. The priests perform Abhisheka and return, before noon.

== Travel ==
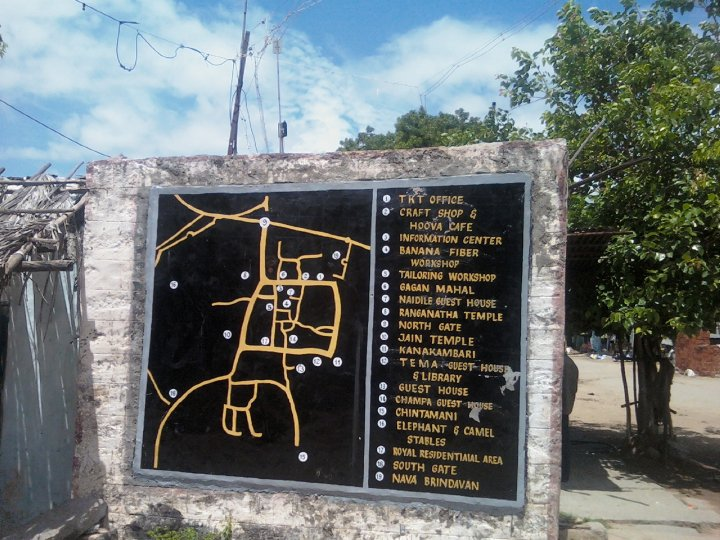
City of Anegundi Map

- Travel to Gangavati City which is located in Karnataka:
  - Regular buses are available from Bangalore to Gangavati
  - Trains are available from Bengaluru and Chennai to reach Hospet and it is easy to commute to Gangavati through bus or car
  - Nearby Airport is Hubli and there are few flights from Bangalore to Hubli and it is flexible to commute to Gangavati/Anegundi using Cars or Bus services
- Reach Anegundi village from Gangavati in a 25-minute journey using auto, car or bus from Gangavati bus stand and walk towards the river shore (refer to the Anegundi Map location 19)
- Take a boat from Anegundi to reach Navabrindhavana

Routes:

Train route:

From Bengaluru to Hosapete:

Bengaluru - Hubballi Hampi express passes through Hosapete daily.

From Chennai to Hosapete by train :

Option 1:

Chennai to Guntakal (Mumbai trains are passing through this station) and Guntakal to Hosapete trains are available by daily.

Option 2:

Chennai to Renigunta (Minimum 4 trains are available daily) and Renigunta to Hosapete train (Haripriya Express) is available by Daily.

Bus route:

Bangalore -Tumkur – Sira -Chitradurga – (moved from NH-4 to NH-13) – Hospet – Anegundi. Distance: approximately 365 km

An Alternate route from Chennai is:

Chennai – Tirupati – Anantapur (all along NH205); Anantapur – Gooty (on NH7); Gooty – Bellary – Hospet (on NH63) – Anegundi

Direction to visit from Mantralaya to Navabrindhavana:

The direction of travel by road is as follows,

By KSRTC bus, you can travel to Raichur from Mantralayam( 1.5 hrs travel). From Raichur, board KSRTC bus to Ganagvathi (3 hrs travel). From there you can reach Anaegundhi (20 mins travel) by local bus.

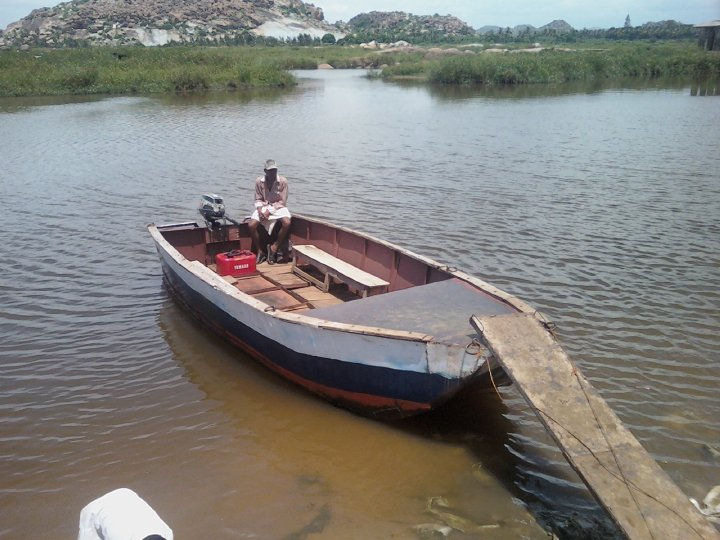
Boat waiting at Anegundi rivershore for pilgrims to travel towards Navabrindhavan Island in a 10 minutes boat journey
