= Madhva Vaishnavas =

Hindu communities that follow Madhva Sampradaya

Madhva Vaishnavas or Sadh Vaishnavas or Madhvas (also spelled as Madhwas) are Hindu communities in India, who follow Sadh Vaishnavism and Dvaita philosophy propounded by Madhvacharya. They are found mostly in the Indian states of Karnataka, Maharashtra, Goa, Tamil Nadu, Kerala, Telangana and Andhra Pradesh.

== Demographics and communities ==
Followers of Madhvacharya include communities that follow all Varnashrama such as Brahmin (all Madhva Brahmins), Kshatriya, Vaishya, and Shudra. All Hindu communities that follow Madhvacharya are inclusively called Madhva Vaishnavas or Sadh Vaishnavas or Madhvas. There are many Hindu Communities that have a section that follows the Dvaita Vedanta of Madhvacharya. Vadiraja Tirtha has converted a section of the Konkani-speaking Svarnakara (gold-smith) community by the name Daivadnyas to the Madhva fold. So Madhvas among Daivadnyas follow Sodhe Matha of Vadiraja Tirtha from North Karnataka and South Karnataka. Vadiraja Tirtha is also said to have converted many people from other communities in Gujarat and other places. Pontiffs from Adamaru Matha also converted many people from Suvarnakara (gold-smith) and other communities. Vyasaraja Matha also have followers among Akkasala community, a gold-smith community in Salem district of Tamil Nadu. In Andhra Pradesh region including present-day Telangana state, Narahari Tirtha is said to have converted many people into the Madhva fold. So in Karnataka, Andhra Pradesh, Telangana, and Maharashtra there are various Hindu communities that follow Madhva Sampradaya and are followers of Uttaradi Matha. In the late 19th century pontiffs of Majjige Halli Matha converted many people from Saurashtra Vaishya (mercantile) community from Madurai district of Tamil Nadu to the Madhva faith. Narahari Tirtha has converted Ganga kings of Kalinga and Matsya rulers of Oddadi to Madhva fold. The Ganga kings of Kalinga and the Matsya kings of Oddavadi were very much influenced by the Vaishnava movement of Sri Madhvacharya. The Simhachalam inscriptions of 1290 and 1292 A.D. refer to the gifts of King Jayanta of the Matsya dynasty, at the instance of Narahari Tirtha. The new names taken by the members of the royal family indicate their conversion to Vaishnavism. Arjuna, Annamraja, and Mankaditya assume the names of Narasimhavardhana, Gopalavardhana, and Srirangavardhana. Narahari Tirtha is also said to have converted many princely and aristocratic families of Kalinga region (Orissa and Coastal Andhra) to the Madhva fold. The descendants of these families still flourish in the coastal Andhra and adjoining states and are followers of Uttaradi Matha. In the early 19th century Vishvadhiraja Tirtha of Sode Matha converted few people from Nambudiri and Nair communities to Madhva fold.

== See also ==
- Madhvacharya
- Dvaita Vedanta
- Sadh Vaishnavism
- Bhagavatism

== Bibliography ==
- Sharma, B. N. Krishnamurti (2000). A History of the Dvaita School of Vedānta and Its Literature, 3rd Edition. Motilal Banarsidass (2008 Reprint). ISBN 978-8120815759.
- Hebbar, B.N (2005). The Sri-Krsna Temple at Udupi: The History and Spiritual Center of the Madhvite Sect of Hinduism. Bharatiya Granth Nikethan. ISBN 81-89211-04-8.
