= Vyasaraja Math (Sosale) =

Hindu monastery

Sri Vyasaraja Math (Sosale) (also written as Vyasaraja Matha (Sosale) or Vyasaraja Mutt (Sosale)) (Kannada: ಸೋಸಲೆ ವ್ಯಾಸರಾಜ ಮಠ) is one of the Dvaita Vedanta monasteries (matha) descended from Jagadguru Śrī Madhvācārya through Jayatirtha and Rajendra Tirtha (a disciple of Vidyadhiraja Tirtha) and further through Lakshmikantha Tirtha and their disciples.

Vidyadhiraja Tirtha's disciples are Kavindra Tirtha and Rajendra Tirtha. Kavindra Tirtha continued in the main lineage of Uttaradi Matha and Rajendra Tirtha established a new matha. This matha was known as Rajendra Tirtha Matha. This Rajendra Math is also known by the name of Poorvadi Matha. These lineages were formed and continued for the benefit of the Madhva philosophy so that more and more individuals consequently have access to the philosophy and get Upadeśa (spiritual guidance). After the times of famous Vyasatirtha it came to be known as Vyasaraja Math. Vyasaraja Math, along with Uttaradi Math and Raghavendra Math, are considered to be the three premier apostolic institutions of Dvaita Vedanta and are jointly referred as Mathatraya . It is the pontiffs and pandits of the Mathatraya that have been the principle architects of post-Madhva Dvaita Vedanta through the centuries. Vyasaraja Matha got split into Vyasaraja Math (Sosale) and Vyasaraja Math (Kundapura) after Rama Tirtha. Lakshmikantha Tirtha and Sridhara Tirtha were disciples of Rama Tirtha. Lakshmikantha Tirtha continued in the lineage of Vyasaraja Math (Sosale) and Sridhara Tirtha continued in the lineage of Vyasaraja Math (Kundapura).

== Guru Parampara ==
1. Śrī Madhvacharya
2. Śrī Padmanabha Tirtha
3. Śrī Naraharitirtha
4. Śrī Madhava Tirtha
5. Śrī Akshobhya Tirtha
6. Śrī Jayatirtha
7. Śrī Vidyadhiraja Tirtha
8. Śrī Rajendra Tīrtha
9. Śrī Jayadwaja Tīrtha
10. Śrī Purushothama Tīrtha
11. Śrī Bramhanya Tīrtha
12. Śrī Śrī Vyasa Tīrtha (or Sri Chandrikacharya)
13. Śrī Srinivasa Tīrtha
14. Śrī Rama Tīrtha
15. Śrī Lakshmikantha Tīrtha
16. Śrī Sripathi Tīrtha
17. Śrī Ramachandra Tīrtha
18. Śrī Lakshmivallabha Tīrtha
19. Śrī Lakshminatha Tīrtha
20. Śrī Lakshmipathi Tīrtha
21. Śrī Lakshminarayana Tīrtha
22. Śrī Raghunatha Tīrtha (or Sri Sheshachandrikacharya)
23. Śrī Jagannatha Tīrtha (or Sri Bhashyadeepikacharya)
24. Śrī Srinatha Tīrtha
25. Śrī Vidyanatha Tīrtha
26. Śrī Vidyapathi Tīrtha
27. Śrī Vidyavallabha Tīrtha
28. Śrī Vidyakaantha Tīrtha
29. Śrī Vidyanidhi Tīrtha
30. Śrī Vidyapurna Tīrtha
31. Śrī Vidyasrisindhu Tīrtha
32. Śrī Vidyasridhara Tīrtha
33. Śrī Vidyasrinivasa Tīrtha
34. Śrī Vidyasamudra Tīrtha
35. Śrī Vidyaratnakara Tīrtha
36. Śrī Vidyavaridhi Tīrtha
37. Śrī Vidyaprasanna Tirtha
38. Śrī Vidyapayonidhi Tīrtha
39. Śrī Vidyavachaspathi Tīrtha
40. Śri Vidyasreesha Tirtha (present pontiff)

== Present Pontiff ==
Mahamahopadhya Prof. D. Prahladacharya, Former Vice-Chancellor of Rashtriya Samskrit Vidyapeeta, Tirupati was crowned as the new with the pontifical name of Sri Vidyashreesha Tirtha on 2 July 2017 at Tirumakudalu, Mysore, Karnataka.

== See also ==
- Ashta Mathas of Udupi
- Paryaya
