= Koodli =

Kudli Koodli, Kudali
- village
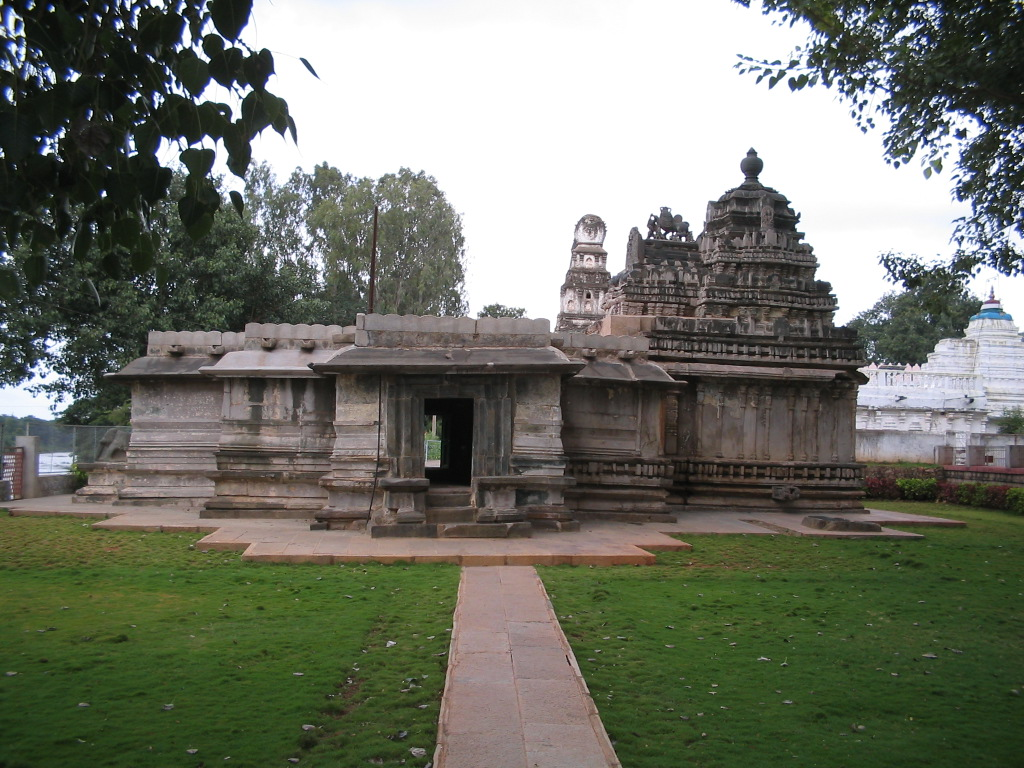

- Location in Karnataka, India
- Coordinates: 14°0′22″N 75°40′27″E
- Country: India
- State: Karnataka

Languages
  - Official: Kannada
- Time zone: UTC+5:30 (IST)

Koodli, also spelled Kudli or Kudali, is a small historic village in Shimoga District, in the Indian state of Karnataka. It is at the sangam (confluence) of two rivers, the Tunga River and Bhadra River at nearly 1,200 metres (3,937 ft). They meet here to give rise to the Tungabhadra River, a tributary of the Krishna river. Their valleys host many architectural sites. The village was a much larger town and pilgrimage center before the 14th-century, one destroyed during the Islamic conquests of the south. Important temples and their ruins here include the a Sharadamba temple and the Kudali Matha, a branch of the Jagadguru Sri Shankaracharya Dakshinamnaya Sringeri Sharada Peetham Peetham, Sangamesvara temple (8th-century, oldest), Ramesvara temple, Sri Chintamani Narasimha temple, Sringeri Vediki temple (with monastery), Vishwakarma temple, Sharadamba temple (with monastery), Amma Devasthana, Brahmeswara temple and the Shree Madhvacharya Kudli Arya Akshobhya Tirtha Matha. Other scattered ruins of unknown temples are also found here.

This site should not be confused with the other historic temples site called Kudalasangama, which is about 300 kilometres (186 mi) north where rivers Malaprabha and Krishna meet.

== Location ==
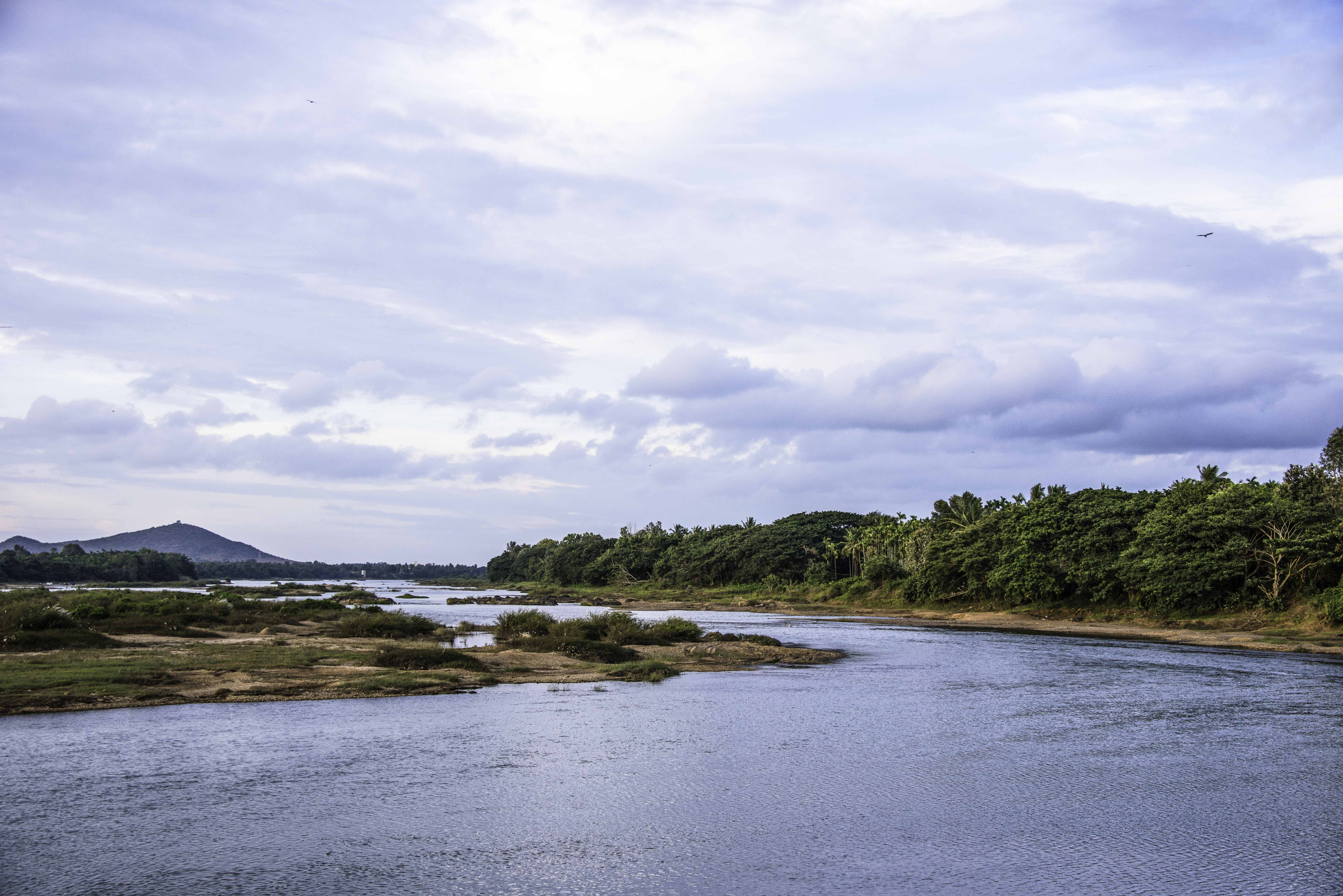
Landscape at Kudli Sangama

Koodli is 18 km from Shivamogga, a place where rivers Tunga and Bhadra flow together, hence the name Koodli. It has a Smarta Vedanta monastery stated to have been founded by Adi Shankara. Within the premises of the matha, there are shrines of Sharadamba and Shankaracharya. Outside, there are two temples of Hoysala times dedicated to Rameshwara and Narasimha. Koodali is also known as Varanasi of the south. It is home to Rushyashrama, Brahmeshwara, Narasimha and Rameshwara temples. The ancient mutt of Adi Shankaracharya was relocated back here some 600 years ago and still stands with inscriptions of Hoysala and Okkeri kings.

== History ==
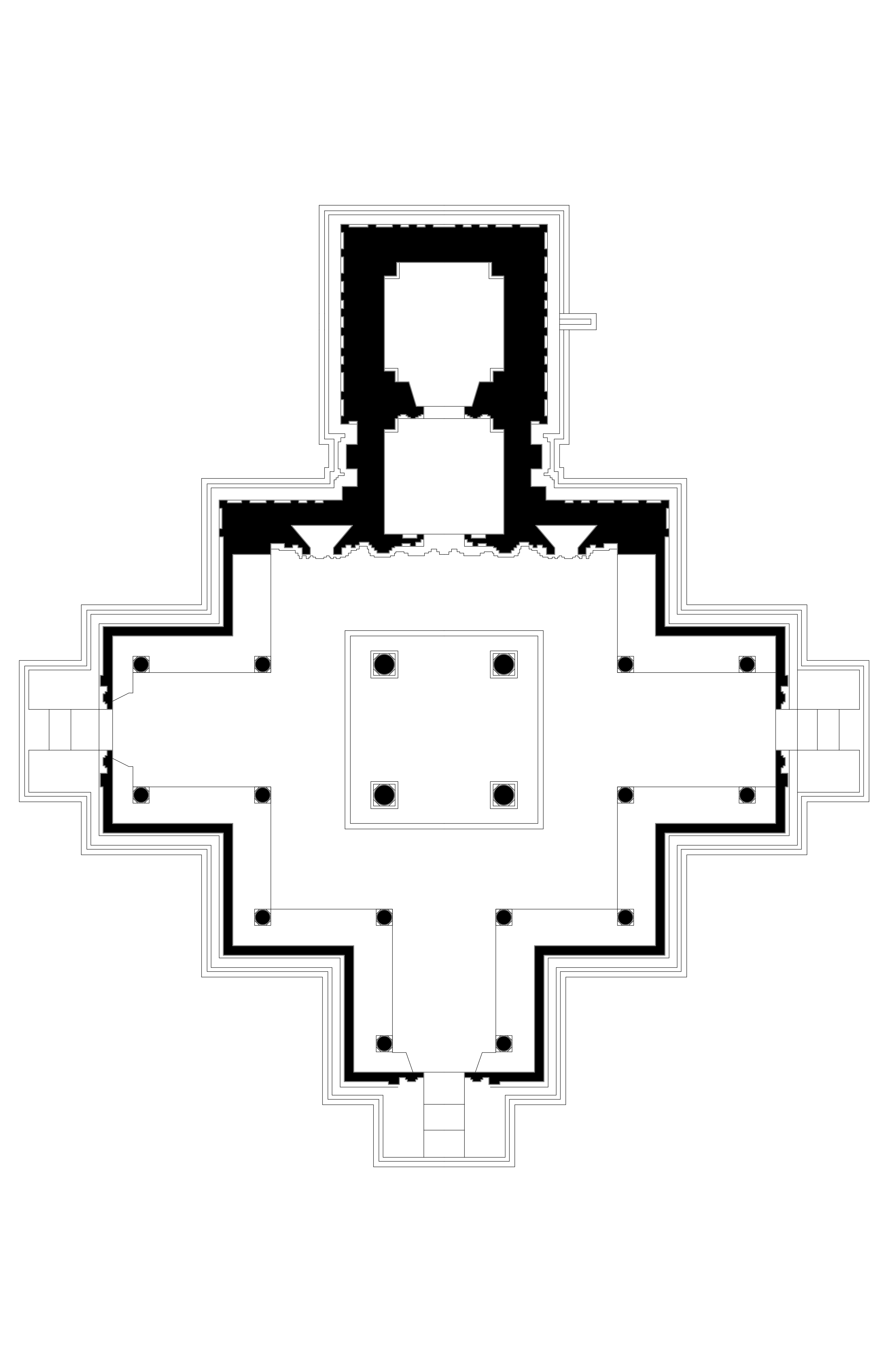
Floor plan of Ramesvara temple, Kudli Karnataka

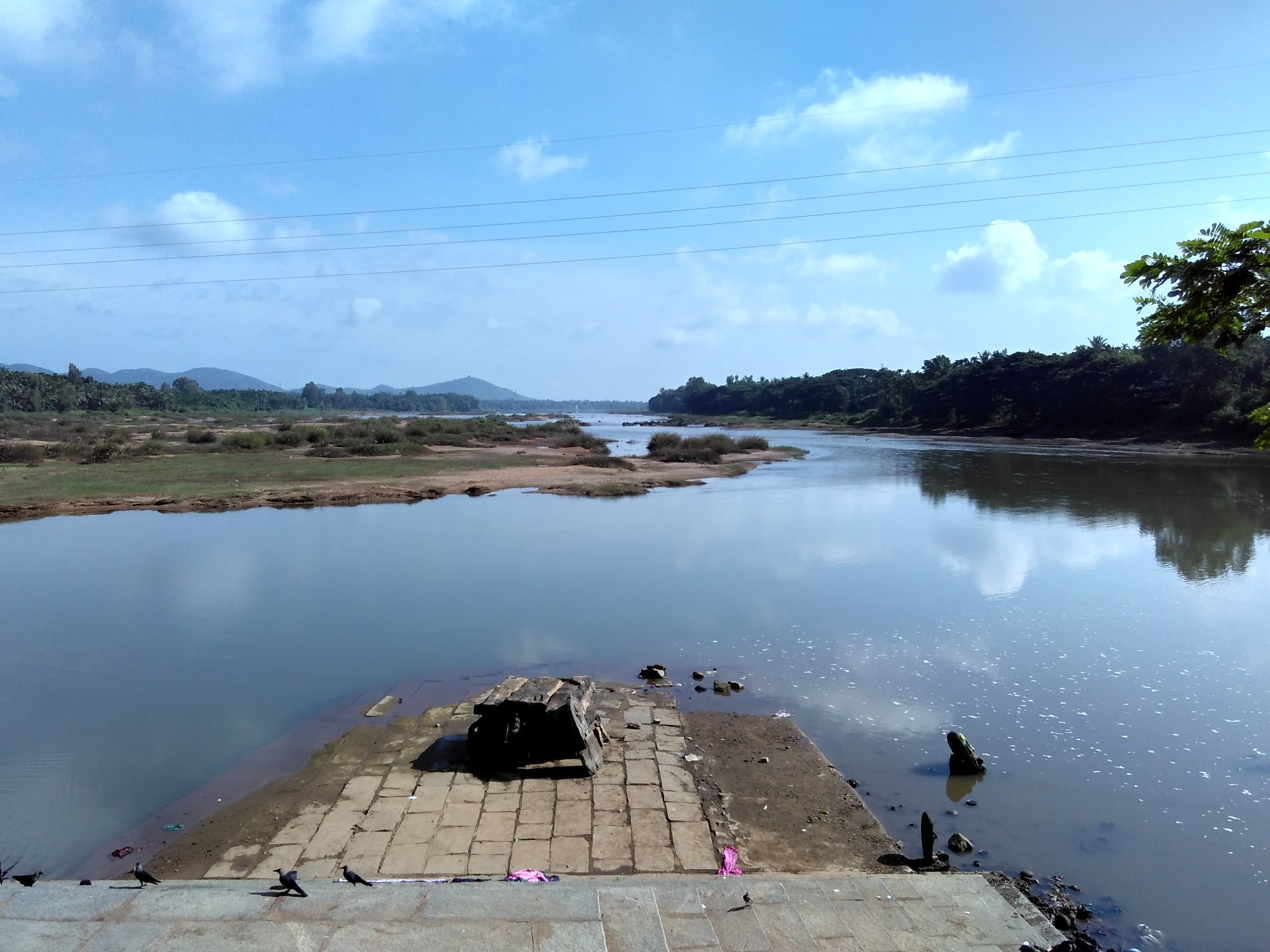
Tunga Joins Bhadra in Koodli

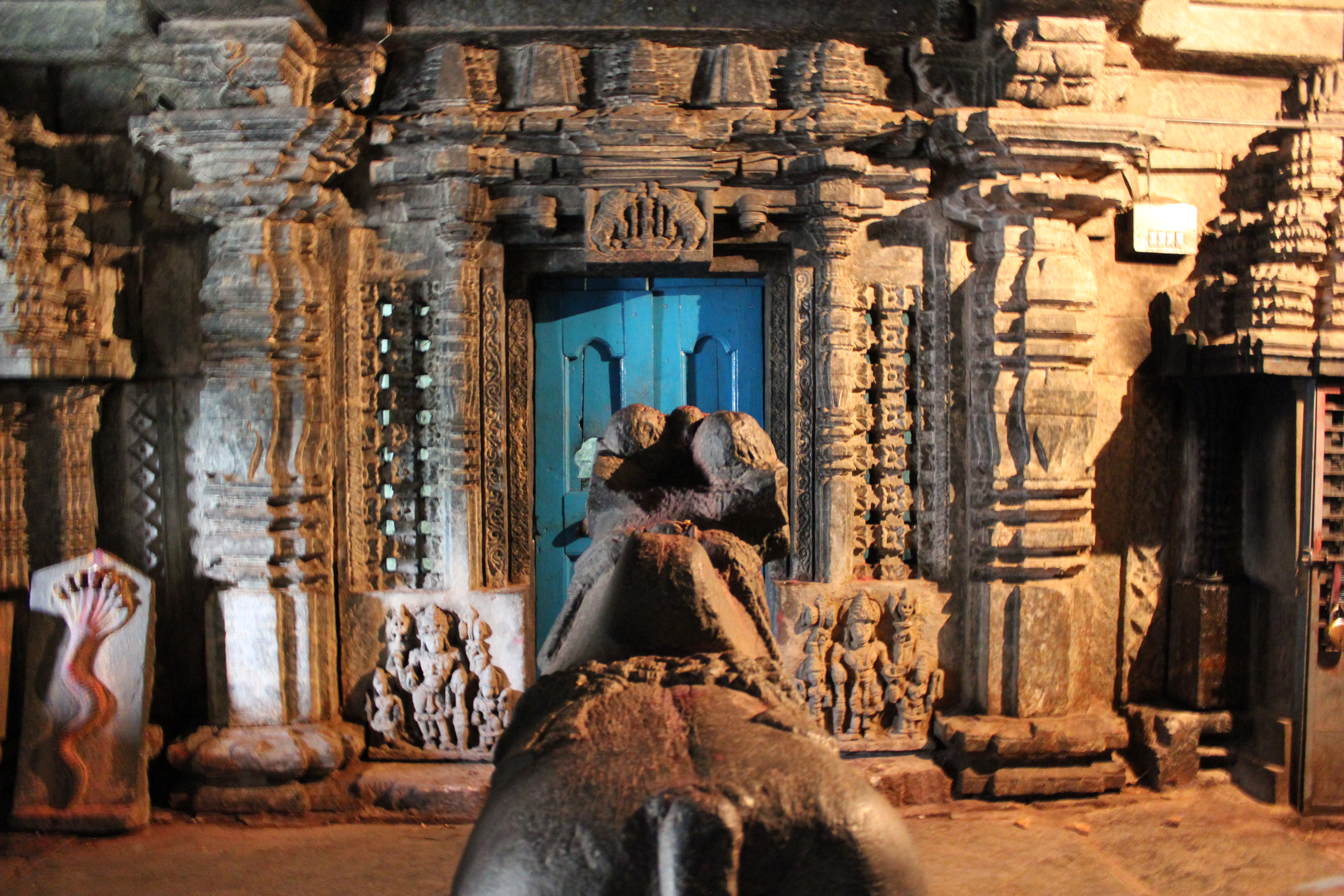
Ornate entrance to the main shrine inside the Rameshvara temple

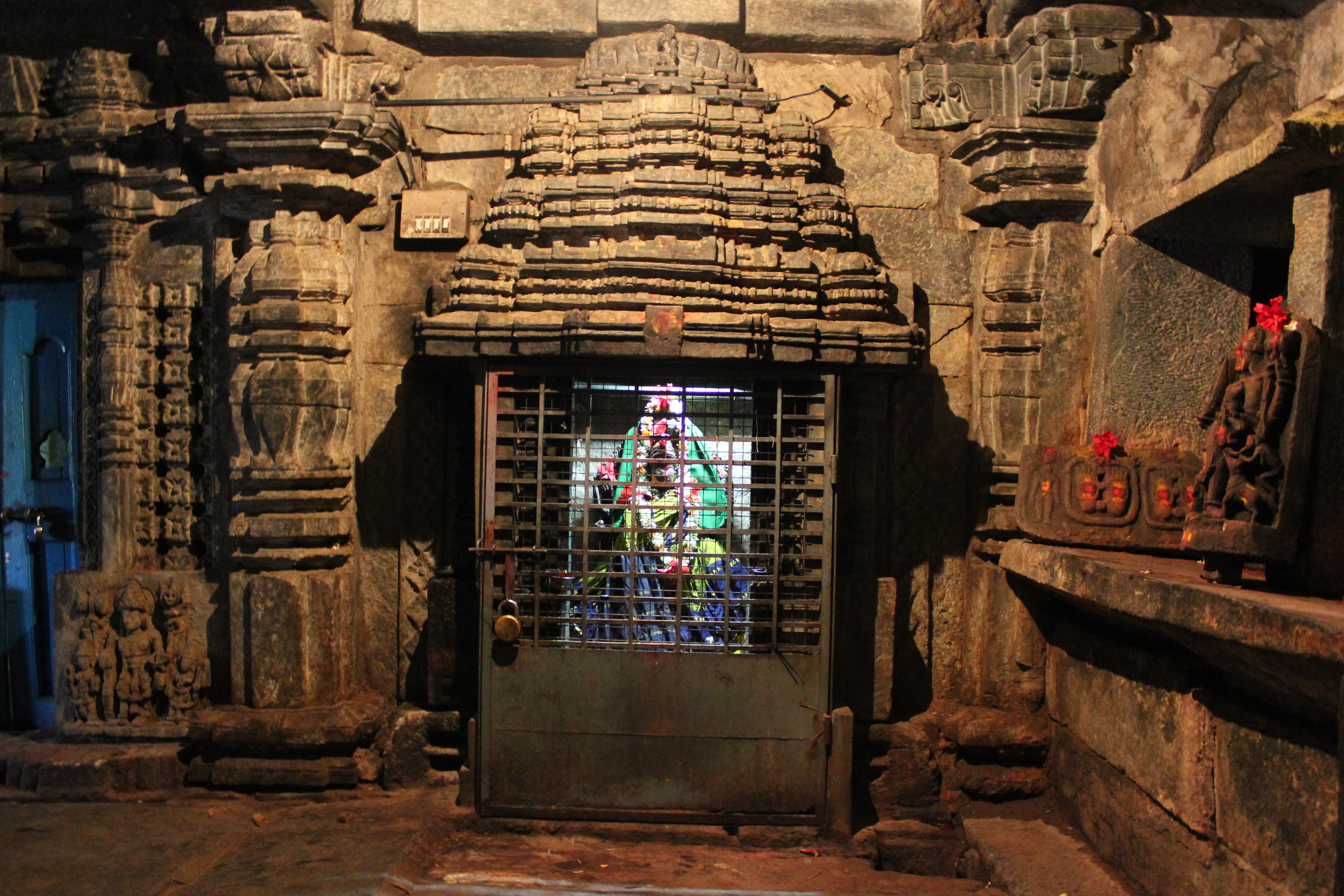
A small shrine inside the Rameshvara temple

The place has a historic value, with temples of near Hoysala time. There are shasanas carved near the temples that indicate the era when they were built. The exact dates are disputed, but the sculptures date back to age old Indian culture and look exotic. There are various temples - small and large ones built by the rulers who ruled this place in the age old era.

== Religion ==
The 12th century Rameshwara Temple is located in the area. There is also a Sri Chintamani Narasimha Swamy Temple beside the Sangameshwara temple. It is believed to be installed and worshipped by Sri Prahlada. The rivers are worshipped and considered to be sacred. A small temple with Nandi denotes the exact point where the two rivers meet, and is considered to be sacred.

There are two mutts (schools) in Koodli. One is Shankara mutt (Advaita Philosophy) & the other being Akshobhya Thirtha Mutt (Dvaita Philosophy).

=== Shankara Mutt ===
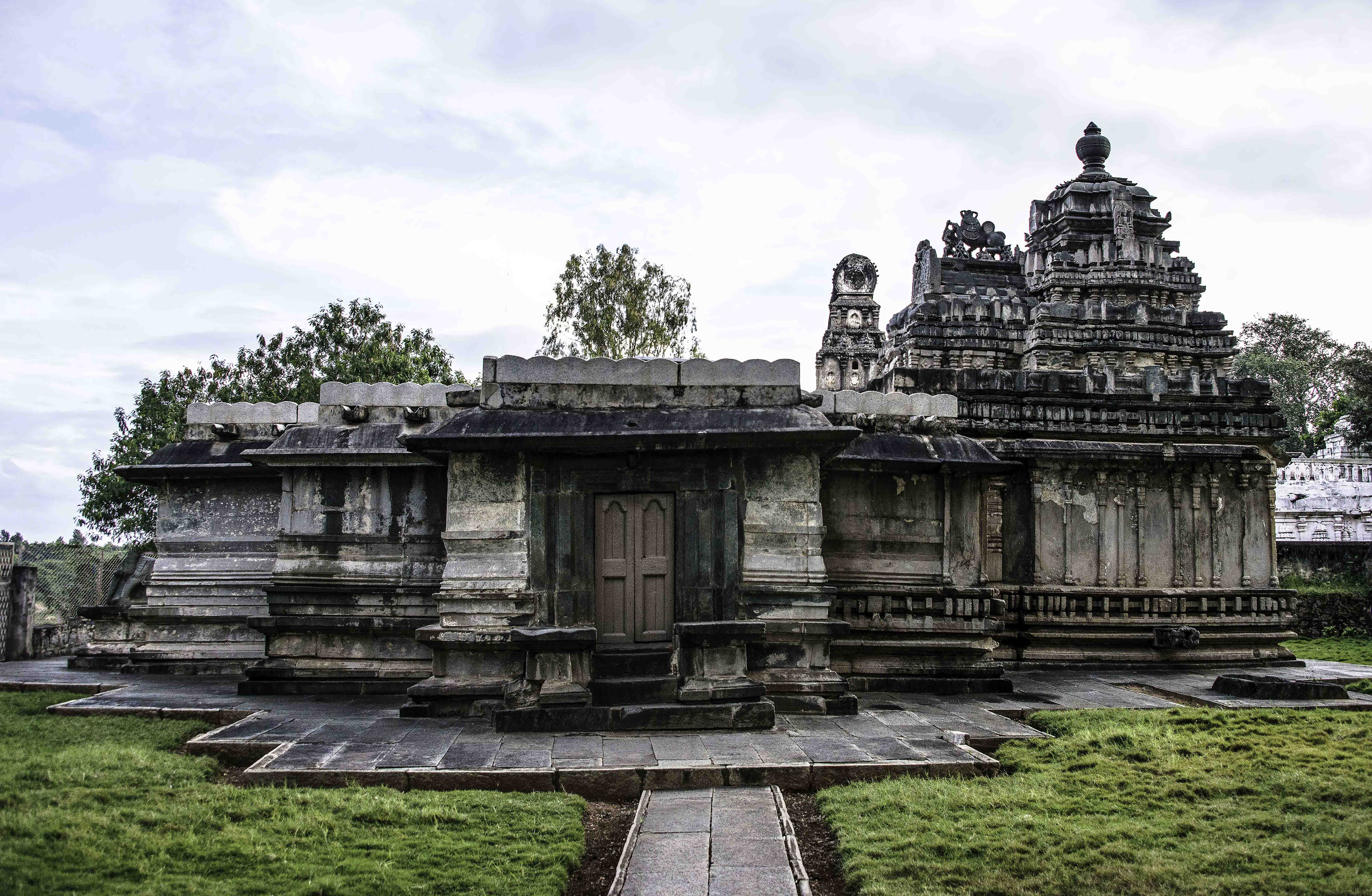
Shiva temple at Kudli

There is very old Indian style school of learning for Shankara philosophy, called the Koodli mutt. This has a long history: Once upon a time in the 15th or 16th century, the chief Swami of Shringeri had been on a teerthayaatre, probably to Kashi. He did not return for a long time, which caused the local chiefs to ask the deputy chief to take up the chief's position. But the chief was alive and so the latter refused. He went away to the old mutt at Kudali. When the chief returned after a long time, he met his disciple at Kudali and heard of the events. He stayed at Kudali itself and the guru parampara continued from Kudali from then. Now in the beginning of the 1900s, the swami who took the position of the chief Swami was formerly the teacher of his highness Krishnaraja Wodeyar the 4th, Maharaja of Mysore. This brought good times to this mutt again. At present the 71st Swami and 72nd Swami in the lineage are peethadhipatis at Kudali.

=== Koodli Arya Akshobhya Thirtha Mutt ===
The Mutt was established by Sri Akshobhya Tirtha (a direct disciple of Sri Madhvacharya) around the 13th or 14th century. This matha was bifurcated when Akshobhya theertha fell ill and his disciple Sri Jayatirtha was on pilgrimage. Knowing that the time had come for him to enter vrindavana, he ordered one of his disciples to be the pontiff of the Uttaradi Math until Sri Jayatirtha returned. Akshobhya tirtha named him as Sri Trailokyabhushana tirtha, and went into the vrindavan. He had ordered Sri Trailokyabhushana theertha to return all the belongings and deity's of Sri Uttaradi Matha to Sri Jayatirtha once he came back from pilgrimage, in a ceremonious way, and ordered that Sri Jayatirtha would become the next pontiff of Sri Uttaradi Math. So when Sri Jayatirtha returned, Sri Trailokyabhusana handed him all the belongings and deity's of Sri Uttaradi Matha, in a ceremonious way. Seeing the respect of Sri Trailokyabhushana, Sri Jayatirtha handed him some idols and belongings of Sri Uttaradi Matha and advised him to create his own samsthana. So Sri Trailokyabhushana founded Sri Koodli Arya Akshobhya Tirtha Matha at Koodli. The mutt has a rich tradition and is famed for its knowledge of Sanskrit & Madhvacharya's philosophy. There have been three peetadhipathis till date. The current peetadhipathi is H.H. Sri Raghuvijaya Thirta.

In 18th century Satyadharma Tirtha 28th pontiff of Uttaradi Math Brindavan is in Holehonnur near koodli about 3km on the Shivamogga - Chitradurga road on the bank of the river Bhadra Bhadravathi taluk Shivamogga District.

== Geography ==
The place is situated about 16 km away from Shivamogga town and is accessible by road. The nearest village is Holehonnur which is around 3 km from here.
