= Vyasaraja Math =

Vyasaraja Math or Vyasaraja Matha is a Dvaita Monastery name. It may refer to:

- Vyasaraja Math (Sosale)
- Vyasaraja Math (Kundapura)
