= Satyajnana Tirtha =

Sri Satyajnana Tirtha
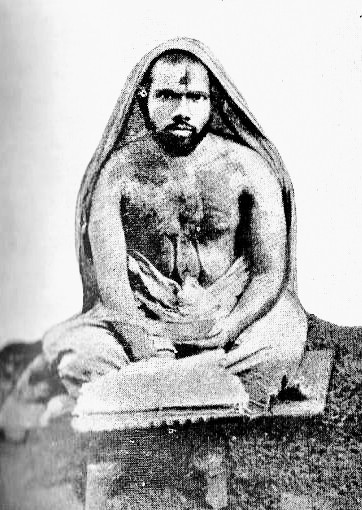

Personal life
- Born: Kinhal Jayacharya
- Died: 1911 Rajahmundry

Religious life
- Religion: Hinduism
- Order: Vedanta (Uttaradi Math)
- Philosophy: Dvaita Vedanta

Religious career
- Teacher: Satyadheera Tirtha
- Successor: Satyadhyana Tirtha

Satyajnana Tirtha was a Hindu philosopher, scholar and saint. He served as the pontiff of Shri Uttaradi Math from 1906 to 1911. He was the 37th in succession from Madhvacharya.

== Bibliography ==
- Sharma, B. N. Krishnamurti (2000). A History of the Dvaita School of Vedānta and Its Literature, Vol 1. 3rd Edition. Motilal Banarsidass (2008 Reprint). ISBN 978-8120815759.
- Rao, C. R. (1984). Srimat Uttaradi Mutt: Moola Maha Samsthana of Srimadjagadguru Madhvacharya.
- Naqvī, Ṣādiq; Rao, V. Kishan (2005). A Thousand Laurels--Dr. Sadiq Naqvi: Studies on Medieval India with Special Reference to Deccan, Volume 2. Department of Ancient Indian History, Culture & Archaeology, Osmania University.
