= Kavindra Tirtha =

Hindu guru

H. H. Shri 1008 Shri Kavindra Tīrtha Shrīpādaru

Personal life
- Born: Vishnudasacharya; 1333
- Died: 1398 (aged 64–65) Hampi
- Resting place: Nava Brindavana
- Notable work: Vaadaratnavali

Religious life
- Religion: Hinduism
- Order: Vedanta (Uttaradi Math)
- Philosophy: Dvaita Vedanta

Religious career
- Teacher: Vidyadhiraja Tirtha
- Successor: Vagisha Tirtha
- Disciples: Vagisha Tirtha

Kavīndra Tīrtha (Sanskrit:कवीन्द्रतीर्थ); (c. 1333 - c.1398), was a Dvaita philosopher, saint, scholar and the seventh peetadhipathi of Madhvacharya Peetha — Shri Uttaradi Matha from 1392-1398.

== Life ==
Kavindra in his previous stage of life is identical with Viṣṇudāsācārya, the author of the Vādaratnāvalī. The latter is said to be revered by the former. Other scholars assert that Viṣṇudāsācārya lived from 1390-1440 .

== Bibliography ==
- Sharma, Chandradhar (1994). A Critical Survey of Indian Philosophy. Motilal Banarsidass. ISBN 978-81-208-0365-7.
- Bryant, Edwin Francis (2007), Krishna: A Sourcebook, Oxford University Press, ISBN 978-0-19-803400-1
- Klostermaier, Klaus K. (2007), A Survey of Hinduism (3 ed.), State University of New York Press, ISBN 978-0-7914-7081-7
- Edwin Gerow (ed.) (1990). The Jewel-Necklace of Argument: (the Vādaratnāvali of Viṣṇudāsācārya). New Haven, Conn: American Oriental Society, 1990.
- Rao, C. R. (1984). Srimat Uttaradi Mutt: Moola Maha Samsthana of Srimadjagadguru Madhvacharya.
- Sharma, B. N. Krishnamurti (2000). History of the Dvaita School of Vedānta and Its Literature: From the Earliest Beginnings to Our Own Time. Delhi: Motilal Banarsidass. ISBN 9788120815759. OCLC 53463855.
