= Baidyanath Saraswati =

Indian Anthropologist

Prof. Baidyanath Saraswati
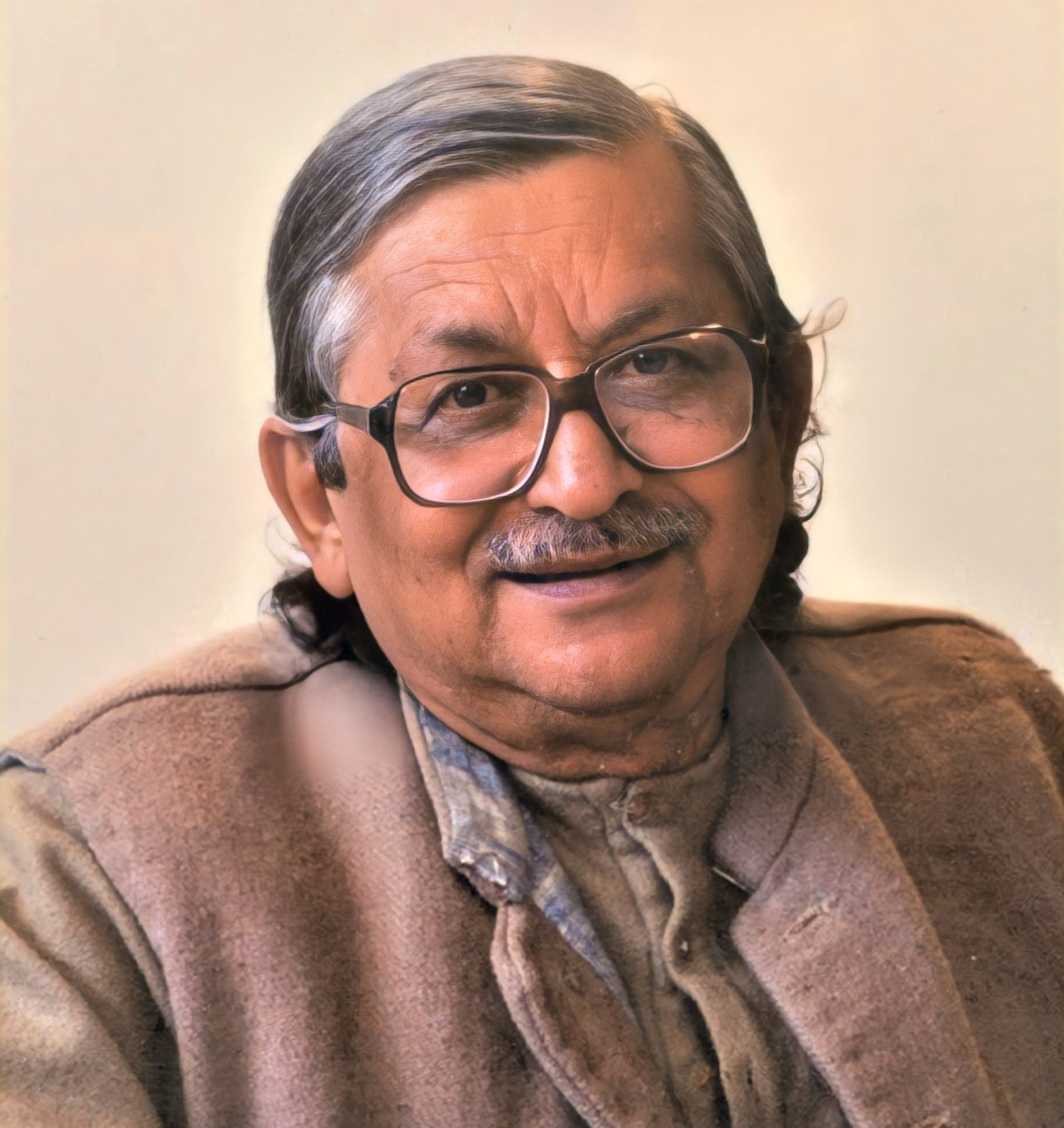
- Born: 20 January 1932; Mithila, Bihar, India
- Died: 13 December 2013 (aged 81); Varanasi, India
- Occupation: anthropologist

Academic background
- Education: Ranchi University

Baidyanath Saraswati (20 January 1932 – 13 December 2013) was an anthropologist and an author of many books on Indian culture, religion, and tribal studies. He held the UNESCO Chair in the field of Cultural Development at the Indira Gandhi National Center for the Arts (IGNCA, New Delhi) from 1995 – 2002. Saraswati represented the Indian government at the UNESCO meeting in Paris in 1989 on safeguarding folklore, where he served as Vice-Chairman in preparation of a draft recommendation to member states. In 1994, he participated in UNESCO's Barcelona Declaration on the Role of Religion in the Promotion of a Culture of Peace.

== Early life ==
He earned Master’s degree in Anthropology from Ranchi University in 1956, and Ph.D. in Cultural Anthropology from Ranchi University in 1967.

== Career ==
Saraswati was anthropologist at the Anthropological Survey of India (ASI) from 1959 to 1967. It brought him closer to the Gandhian anthropologist Nirmal Kumar Bose. He left the ASI after a decade to become a Fellow at the Indian Institute of Advanced Studies, Shimla. After N K Bose died in 1972, he founded the N K Bose Memorial Foundation (since closed) in Varanasi, a Gandhian institution conducting social sciences research. It also ran a school as an experiment in self-organizing primary education. Saraswati taught anthropological theories and tribal development as a Visiting Professor at Viswa Bharati and Ranchi University and as a Verrier Elwin Chair Professor at North Eastern Hill University, Shillong. He was Research Professor, and then UNESCO Professor at the IGNCA, New Delhi. He was also a Visiting Professor at Ecole des Hautes Etudes en Sciences Sciciales Maison des Sciences de I Home, Paris in 1988, and at the Institute of Asian Cultural Studies (International Christian University), Tokyo in 1999.

== Awards ==
2004: Honorary Fellowship of the Asiatic Society

2005: Life Time Achievement Award, Indian Social Science Association

== Research contributions ==
Saraswati, in his book Pottery Making Cultures and Indian Civilization, found that though traditional technology and social practices among the potters of India were confined to five zones, the technology practiced in all the zones had a common origin from the days of the Indus Valley civilization. He explored Brahamanic ritual traditions, and the social organizations of ascetics and pandits of Kashi. He used the metaphor of Nilakantha (the blue neck of Shiva, the deity of the sacred city) to explain how unity and continuity in the cultural traditions of Kashi are maintained and deal with the challenges of modernization. Saraswati offered a new classification of culture in terms of the modes of transmission of knowledge: Oral (laukika), Textual (sastriya), and Transcendental (naivrittika). The tribes in India are people of oral tradition, and according to Saraswati, there is nothing in the Indian thought structure nor the traditional organization of Indian society that may correspond to the Western evolutionary notion of the tribe. He wrote extensively on cosmogenic myths of creation in the northeast tribes of India.

Saraswati characterized Sanatan (eternal) Hinduism by five-fold features. It is a religion without an organization and absorbs multiple beliefs and practices without destroying individual identity. He has also "highlighted the points of congruence between religion and science and finds evidence for a paradigm shift in anthropology and cosmology. It challenges the old concepts of social anthropology but strengthens philosophical anthropology by presenting a compelling picture of man in the Universe"

Saraswati traveled across India to explore native categories of thoughts in text and context. His works crystallized the idea of the Sacred Science of Man based on the Indian vision, the scriptural sources, and the indigenous interpretations of man and culture. It emerged as an alternative paradigm in anthropology. He has explored fundamental concepts in Space, Time, Nature, Sound, and Mind, integrating them with anthropology and sociology. His boo Culture and Cosmos investigates the many facets of the core principles of cosmic anthropology.

== Select publications ==
=== Books authored ===
- Saraswati, Baidyanath; Behura, Nab Kishore (1966). Pottery Techniques in Peasant India. Anthropological Survey of India.. (Co-author N K Behura). Anthropological Survey of India, Calcutta.
- Saraswati, Baidyanath; University, Karnatak (1970). Contributions to the Understanding of Indian Civilization. Karnatak University.
- Saraswati, Baidyanath (1975). Kashi: Myth and Reality of a Classical Cultural Tradition. Indian Institute of Advanced Study.
- Saraswati, Baidyanath (1977-01-01). Brahmanic ritual traditions in the crucible of time (First ed.). Indian Institute of Advanced Study.
- Sinha, Surajit; Saraswati, Baidyanath (1978). Ascetics of Kashi: An Anthropological Exploration. N.K. Bose Memorial Foundation.
- Saraswati, Baidyanath (1978). Pottery-making Cultures and Indian Civilization. Abhinav Publications. ISBN 978-81-7017-091-4.
- Vidyarthi, Lalita Prasad; Jha, Makhan; Saraswati, Baidyanath (1979). The Sacred Complex of Kashi: A Microcosm of Indian Civilization. Concept Publishing Company.
- Saraswati, Baidyanath (1983). Traditions of Tirthas in India: The Anthropology of Hindu Pilgrimage. NK Bose Memorial Foundation.
- Saraswati, Baidyanath (1984). The Spectrum of the Sacred: Essays on the Religious Traditions of India. Concept. ISBN 978-0-391-03177-7.
- Sacred Science of Man. Institute of Social Research and Applied Anthropology, Calcutta (1993).
- The Sacred Science of Nature. NEHU, Shillong(1997).
- Saraswati, Baidyanath (2004-02-02). The Eternal Hinduism. New Delhi: DK Printworld. ISBN 978-81-246-0249-2.
- Saraswati, Baidyanath (2004-11-15). Cultures and Cosmos: The Cosmic Anthropological Principle. Aryan Books International. ISBN 978-81-7305-258-3.

=== Selected Books edited ===
- Tribal thought and culture: Essays in honour of Surajit Chandra Sinha (First ed.). New Delhi: Concept Pub. House. ISBN 978-81-7022-340-5.
- "Art The Integral Vision - DK Printworld (P) Ltd". 2022-12-29.
- Pakrti, the Integral Vision. New Delhi: D.K. Printworld. ISBN 978-81-246-0036-8.
- Cross-Cultural Lifestyle Studies. IGNCA and New Age International, New Delhi
- Interface of Cultural Identity and Development (First ed.). New Delhi: D.K. Printworld. ISBN 978-81-246-0054-2.
- Integration of Endogenous Cultural Dimension into Development (1st ed.). New Delhi: D.K. Printworld. ISBN 978-81-246-0089-4.
- Cultural Dimension of Education (1st ed.). New Delhi: D.K. Printworld. ISBN 978-81-246-0101-3.
- Cultural Dimension of Ecology (1st ed.). New Delhi: D.K. Printworld. ISBN 978-81-246-0102-0.
- Life-Style and Ecology (1st ed.). New Delhi: D.K. Printworld. ISBN 978-81-246-0103-7.
- Culture of Peace: Experience and Experiment. New Delhi: Indira Gandhi National Centre for Arts. ISBN 978-81-246-0124-2.
- The Nature of Man and Culture: Alternative Paradigms in Anthropology. New Delhi. ISBN 978-81-7305-196-8.
- Pilgrimage — Sacred Landscapes and Self-Organized Complexity. New Delhi. ISBN 978-81-246-0454-0.
- Voice of God: Traditional Thought and Modern Science. New Delhi. ISBN 978-81-246-0472-4.
