= Yergol =

Yergol Yargol
- village
- Location in Karnataka, India Yergol (India)
- Coordinates: 16°54′17″N 77°3′58″E
- Country: India
- State: Karnataka
- District: Yadgir
- Taluka: Yadgir

Government
  - Type: Panchayat raj
  - Body: Gram panchayat

Population (2001)
  - Total: 8,132

Languages
  - Official: Kannada
- Time zone: UTC+5:30 (IST)
- ISO 3166 code: IN-KA
- Vehicle registration: KA
- Website: karnataka.gov.in

Yergol is a panchayat village in the southern state of Karnataka, India, in the Yadgir Taluka of Yadgir district.

Yergol is the only village in the gram panchayat.

== Demographics ==
As of 2001 India census, Yergol had a population of 8,132 with 4,175 males and 3,957 females.
