= Vidyadhiraja Tirtha =

Indian philosopher and Scholar

Vidyādhiraja Tīrtha

Personal life
- Born: Krishna Bhatt; 1269
- Died: Unknown

Religious life
- Religion: Hinduism
- Order: Vedanta
- Philosophy: Dvaita Vedanta, Vaishnavism

Religious career
- Teacher: Jayatirtha
- Successor: Kavindra Tirtha (Uttaradi Matha); Rajendra Tirtha (Vyasaraja Math)
- Disciples: Kavindra Tirtha, Rajendra Tirtha

Vidyadhiraja Tirtha was a Hindu philosopher, dialectician and the seventh pontiff of Madhvacharya Peetha and served as peetadhipathi from (c. 1388 – c. 1392).

== Bifurcation of Mathas ==
It was during the time of Vidyadhiraja Tirtha that the first bifurcation of the Madhva Mathas took place. According to tradition Vidyadhiraja want to ordain Rajendra Tirtha, one of his disciples, to succeed him on the pontifical throne. But when Vidyadhiraja fell ill and the time came for formally handing over Matha to Rajendra Tirtha, the latter, who was on tour at the critical juncture. So Vidyadhiraja ordained his disciple Kavindra to succeed him on the pontifical throne. This selection of Kavindra Tirtha as the successor of Vidyadhiraja, leaving Rajendra Tirtha resulted in the bifurcation of the Madhva Mathas, namely Uttaradi Matha presided by Kavindra Tirtha and Vyasaraya Matha at Sosale headed by Rajendra Tirtha. Kavindra Tirtha was formally crowned as "Vedanta Samrat" by his Guru Vidyadhiraja Tirtha in the traditional way. The entire samsthana and all the properties of Uttarādi Matha were publicly handed over to Shri Kavindra Tirtha in a grand ceremony. Sri Uttaradi Matha is the original lineage of the Shri Madhvacharya.

== Works ==
Vidyadhiraja composed five major works they are:

- Chāndogyābhāṣyaṭikā
- Gītā Vivruthi, a complete translation and meaning to Gita Bhashya and Gita Tatparya of Madhva.
- Viṣṇusahasranāmavivruthi, a commentary on Vishnu Sahasranama.
- Vakyārtha-candrika, a commentary on Jayatirtha's Nyāya-sudha.
- Visvapadi (also known as Visvapati), a commentary on Narayana Panditacharya's Sri Madhva Vijaya.

== Bibliography ==
- Sharma, B. N. Krishnamurti (2000). A History of the Dvaita School of Vedānta and Its Literature, Vol 1. 3rd Edition. Motilal Banarsidass (2008 Reprint). ISBN 978-8120815759.
- Devi, K. Sarojini (1990). Religion in Vijayanagara Empire. Sterling Publishers.
- Glasenapp, Helmuth Von (1992). Madhva's Philosophy of the Viṣṇu Faith. Dvaita Vedanta Studies and Research Foundation.
