= Padmanabha Tirtha =

Indian philosopher and Hindu guru

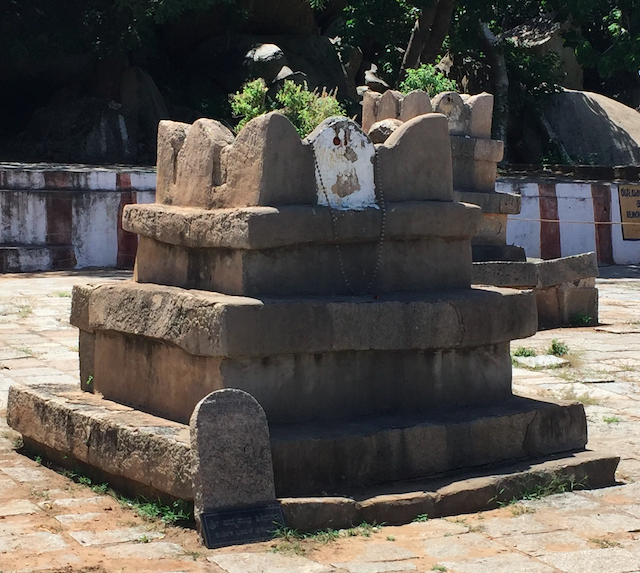
- The Samadhi or Brindavana of Padmanabha Tirtha in Anegundi, Hampi

Personal life
- Born: Shobhana Bhatta Puntamba (Present-day Rahata taluka, Ahmednagar district, Maharashtra)

Religious life
- Religion: Hinduism
- Order: Vedanta
- Philosophy: Dvaita Vedanta

Religious career
- Teacher: Madhvacharya
- Disciples: Narahari Tirtha

Padmanabha Tirtha was an Indian Dvaita philosopher, scholar and the disciple of Madhvacharya. Ascending the pontifical seat after Madhvacharya, he served as the primary commentator of his works and in doing so, significantly elucidated Madhva's terse and laconic style of writing. His pioneering efforts in expanding upon the Dvaita texts to uncover the underlying metaphysical intricacies was taken forward by the 14th Century philosopher, Jayatirtha. Padmanabha is also credited with disseminating the philosophy of Dvaita outside the Tulunadu.

== Life ==
According to Narayana Pandita's Madhva Vijaya, Padmanabha, born Shobhanabhatta, a Kannada Deshastha Rigvedi Brahmin, was an accomplished scholar and logician. Shobhana Bhatta's family were native of North Karnataka. He was born in Puntamba, a town on the bank of the river Godavari in Ahmednagar district of Maharashtra. According to Sumadhva Vijaya, chapter 4, Madhvacharya has passed through Maharashtra on his way to Badrikashrama and back. It also talks about Madhvacharya meeting Mahadeva of Devagiri. During this time Madhva's first meeting with his first disciple from outside Tulunadu, Padmanabha Tirtha, took place at Puntamba on the bank of Godavari. After being won over by Madhva in a debate, he adopted Dvaita and was subsequently tasked by Madhva to disseminate the nascent philosophy across the subcontinent. After that he took Brindavana at Nava Brindavana near Hampi. His disciple Narahari Tirtha succeeded him as the pontiff.

== Works ==
15 extant-works have been ascribed to him, most of which are commentaries on the works of Madhva. His notable works include Nyayaratnavali, a commentary on Madhva's Vishnu Tattva Vinirnaya, Sattarkadipavali a gloss on Bramha Sutra Bhashya and Sannyayaratnavali on Anu Vyakhyana. Sharma notes "dignity, elegance, clearness, brevity and avoidance of digression and controversies mark his style". Though Jayatirtha later diverges from Padmanabha's views, he eulogies the latter's pioneering work in his Nyaya Sudha and acknowledges his influence. Padmanabha's influence is also acknowledged by Vyasatirtha, who attempts, in his Tatparya Chandrika, to reconcile Jayatritha and Padmanabha's views.

== See also ==
- Dvaita literature

== Bibliography ==
- Sharma, B. N. Krishnamurti (2000). A History of the Dvaita School of Vedānta and Its Literature, Vol 1. 3rd Edition. Motilal Banarsidass (2008 Reprint). ISBN 978-8120815759.
- Wilson, H.H (1876). Sketch of Religious Sects of the Hindus. Bishop's College Press.
