= Akshobhya Tirtha =

Hindu guru

Shree Akshobhya Tirtha (ಶ್ರೀ ಅಕ್ಷೋಭ್ಯ ತೀರ್ಥರು)

Personal life
- Born: Govinda Shastri; 1282 North Karnataka
- Died: 1365 (aged 82–83) Malkheda

Religious life
- Religion: Hinduism
- Order: Vedanta
- Philosophy: Dvaita

Religious career
- Teacher: Madhvacharya
- Disciples: Jayatirtha

Shree Akshobhya Tirtha (c. 1282- c. 1365) was a Dvaita philosopher, scholar and theologian. Born as Govinda Bhatta, he received sannyasa from Padmanabha Tirtha and later succeeded Madhava Tirtha as the pontiff of the Madhvacharya peetha from (1350 - 1365). A non-extant work titled Madhva Tantra Samgraha is attributed to him. Sharma contends that Akshobhya retired to Pandharapur in his twilight years where he encountered a youth called Dhondu Pant on the banks of Bhima river, who would later go on to be his disciple and successor, Jayatirtha. His mortal remains rest at Malkhed.

Sri Akshobhya Tirtha installed the idol of Sri Narasimha in Mulbagal. Main Matha lineage continued through Jayatirtha and along with this Akshobhya Tirtha also established a new matha, which is now known by the name of Sri Kudli Arya Akshobhya Tirtha Matha at Kudli near Shivamogga city.

== Bibliography ==
- Sharma, B. N. Krishnamurti (2000). A History of the Dvaita School of Vedānta and Its Literature, Vol 1. 3rd Edition. Motilal Banarsidass (2008 Reprint). ISBN 978-8120815759.
- Rao, S. Hanumantha (1949). Journal Of Indian History. Vol. 27. The University Of Travancore.
- Jackson, William (2007). Vijaynagar Visions: Religious Experience and Cultural Creativity in a South Indian Empire. University of Michigan. ISBN 9780195683202.
