= Madhava Tirtha =

Indian philosopher

Personal life
- Born: Vishnu Shastri North Karnataka
- Died: 1350 AD Mannur, near Gulbarga

Religious life
- Religion: Hinduism
- Order: Vedanta
- Philosophy: Dvaita Vedanta

Religious career
- Teacher: Madhvacharya
- Predecessor: Sri Narahari Tirtha
- Successor: Sri Akshobhya Tirtha
- Disciples: Akshobhya Tirtha Madhuhari Tirtha

Madhava Tirtha was a Hindu philosopher, scholar and the third pontiff of Madhvacharya peetha, from 1333 to 1350, succeeding Narahari Tirtha.

== Works ==
According to S. K. and Gurucarya, he wrote a commentary on Parasara Smriti called Parasara Madhwa-vijaya. He also made commentaries on Rigveda, Yajurveda and Samaveda. His disciple, Sri Madhuhari Teertha, founded a mutt which exists under the name "Majjigenahalli Matha" near Mulbagal.

== Bibliography ==
- Rao, C. R. (1984). Srimat Uttaradi Mutt: Moola Maha Samsthana of Srimadjagadguru Madhvacharya – via Google Books.
- Sharma, B. N. Krishnamurti (2008) [1st pub. 2000]. A History of the Dvaita School of Vedānta and Its Literature. Vol. 1 (3rd ed.). Motilal Banarsidass. ISBN 978-8120815759.
