= Narahari Tirtha =

Dvaita philosopher

Personal life
- Born: Śyama Śastri; 1243 Kalinga, modern day Odisha
- Died: 1333 (aged 89–90) Hampi, Karnataka

Religious life
- Religion: Hinduism
- Order: Vedanta
- Philosophy: Dvaita

Religious career
- Teacher: Madhvacharya
- Disciples: Madhava Tirtha

Narahari Tirtha (c. 1243 - c. 1333) was a Dvaita philosopher, scholar, statesman and one of the disciples of Madhvacharya. He is considered to be the progenitor of the Haridasa movement along with Sripadaraja. Though only two of his scholarly works are extant, they are characterised by their verbosity and lack of digressions. A few songs of his survive under the pen name Raghukulatilaka. As a minister of considerable influence to the Eastern Ganga rulers and later as the pontiff of the Madhvacharya matha, Narahari converted the Simhachalam temple into an educational establishment of renown and a religious centre for Vaishnavism. Narahari Tirtha is the first known composer in Carnatic music.

== Life ==
Nothing is known about his early life except that he served as a minister in the Eastern Ganga Kingdom in Kalinga (modern day North Andhra and Odisha) and later as a regent in the stead of Narasimha Deva II before his ordination as a monk. Information about his life is derived from a hagiography called Narahariyatistotra, Narayana Pandita's Madhva Vijaya and inscriptions from the Srikurmam and Simhachalam temples, all of which attest to his regency. The inscriptions also allude to his expertise in scriptures and swordsmanship. Sharma conjectures from the presence and contents of the inscriptions that post 1281 C.E., he was "the virtual overlord of the country". At the height of his power, he built the Yogananda Narasimha Temple in Srikurmam and defended the city from attacks of vandals. There is also evidence that he was patronised by Bhanudeva I and his ward Narasimha Deva II and also that he disseminated the philosophy of Madhva throughout Kalinga. His mortal remains rest at Charkratirtha near Hampi.

== Works and legacy ==
Narahari's treatise on the Gita Bhashya of Madhva called Bhavaprakashika is considered to be an important work in the Dvaita canon, being referenced by Jayatirtha and Raghavendra Tirtha. Sharma notes that Narahari expands upon the obscure passages in the source text and directs polemical barbs against the commentaries by Sankara and Ramanuja. Though presumably not of Kannada origin, many of his works were in that language although only three of his compositions in Kannada survive. Narahari and Sripadaraja are considered to be the forerunners of the Haridasa movement by penning songs and hymns, mostly containing the teachings of Madhva in simplified terms and set to music in the vernacular Kannada language. Traditionally, Narahari is also considered to be the founder of Atao which was played in Tulu in Udupi later it was known as Yakshagana and Bayalaata, a dance form which still flourishes in Tulu Nadu, in other parts of Karnataka and Tulu Nadu- Kasargod in present-day Kerala.

== Notes ==
1. The songs are yanthu marulade nanenthu and hariye idu sariye.

== Bibliography ==
- Sharma, B. N. Krishnamurti (2000). A History of the Dvaita School of Vedānta and Its Literature, Vol 1. 3rd Edition. Motilal Banarsidass (2008 Reprint). ISBN 978-8120815759.
- Rice, E.P (1982). A History of Kannada Literature. Asian Educational Services, India. ISBN 978-8120600638.
- Sundaram, K (1969). The Simhachalam Temple. Simhachalam Devasthanam.
- Rao, R. Subba (1901). Journal of the Andhra Historical Research Society. Andhra Historical Research Society.
- Banerji, R. D (1930). History of Orissa: From Earliest Times to the British Period. Chatterjee.
