= Jayatirtha =

14th-century Hindu philosopher, dialectician, polemicist

Sri Jayatirtha

Personal life
- Born: Dhondopant Raghunath Deshpande; 1345 CE Mangalwedha near Pandarpur (present-day in Solapur district, Maharashtra, India)
- Parents: Raghunath Pant Deshpande (father); Sakubai (mother)
- Honors: Ṭīkācārya

Religious life
- Religion: Hinduism
- Order: Vedanta
- Philosophy: Dvaita, Vaishnavism

Religious career
- Teacher: Akshobhya Tirtha
- Successor: Vidyadhiraja Tirtha
- Disciples: Vidyadhiraja Tirtha, Vyasatirtha

Jayatirtha (Jaya-tīrtha), also known as Teekacharya (Ṭīkācārya) (c.1345 – c.1388), was a Hindu philosopher, dialectician, polemicist and the sixth pontiff of Madhvacharya Peetha from (1365 – 1388). He is considered to be one of the important seers in the history of Dvaita school of thought on account of his sound elucidations of the works of Madhvacharya. He structured the philosophical aspects of Dvaita and through his polemical works, elevating it to an equal footing with the contemporary schools of thought. Along with Madhva and Vyasatirtha, he is venerated as one of the three great spiritual sages, or munitraya of Dvaita. Jayatirtha is considered an incarnation of Indra (lord of gods) with avesha of Adi Sesha in the Madhva Parampara.

Born into an aristocratic Deshastha Brahmin family, he later adopted the cause of Dvaita after an encounter with the Madhva saint, Akshobhya Tirtha (d. 1365). He composed 21 works, consisting of commentaries on the works of Madhva and several independent treatises criticizing the tenets of contemporary schools, especially Advaita, while simultaneously elaborating upon the Dvaita thought. His dialectical skill and logical acumen earned him the title of Ṭīkacārya or commentator par excellence.

== Biography ==
Historical sources on Jayatirtha's life are scant. Most of the information about his life is derived from two hagiographies: Aṇu Jayatīrtha Vijaya and Bṛhad Jayatīrtha Vijaya from his disciple, Vyāsatirtha (not to be confused with Vyasatirtha) and a compilation by Chalāri Saṁkarṣaṇacārya (c. 1700). According to legendary accounts and the hagiographies, Jayatirtha is an incarnation of Indra, the lord of gods with avesha of Adi Sesha and have been miraculously favoured by the Goddess Durga (Mahalakshmi). In the previous birth, Indra incarnated as Arjuna. In his next life, he incarnated as a Bull. He carried the load of the library of Madhvacharya throughout the Madhva's wanderings between Udupi and Badrinath.

Jayatirtha was born Dhondopant (or Dhondorao) Raghunath into a Deshpande family of nobles belonging to Deshastha Brahmin community of Vishvamitra Gotra in Mangalwedha near Pandarpur present-day in Solapur district, Maharashtra. His father's name is Raghunath Pant Deshpande and his mother's name is Sakubai. His father was a nobleman of military rank. Dhoṇḍo Pant grew up in affluence, with preference towards sports, particularly horse riding.At the age of twenty, after a chance encounter with the ascetic Akshobhya Tīrtha on the bank of river Bhima, he underwent a transformation which led him to renounce his former life, but not without resistance from his family. After much deliberation, his family relented and he was subsequently initiated into the Dvaita fold by Akshobhya Tirtha, who named him Jayatīrtha. Jayatirtha succeeded Akshobhya as the pontiff in 1365. He composed several commentaries and treatises in the brief span of 23 years between his initiation and death in 1388.

== Works ==
There have been 21 works accredited to Jayatirtha, 18 of which are commentaries on the works of Madhvacharya. Nyaya Sudha, which is a commentary on Madhva's Anu Vyakhyana, is considered to be his magnum opus. Running up to 24,000 verses, it discusses and critiques a variety of philosophers and their philosophies, ranging from the orthodox schools of Hinduism like Mimamsa and Nyaya to heterodox schools like Buddhism and Jainism, arguing in favour of Dvaita. Apart from his commentaries, he has authored 4 original treatises, of which Pramana Paddhati and Vadavali stand out. Pramana Paddhati is a short monograph on the epistemology of Dvaita dealing with the pramanas in question, the theory of truth and error and validity of knowledge, while Vadavali deals with the nature of reality and illusion.

== Legacy ==
Jayatirtha occupies a special place in the history of Dvaita Literature. The lucidity and measured style of his writing coupled with his keen dialectical ability has allowed his works to percolate through time, reinforced by the commentaries of later philosophers like Vyasatirtha, Vijayindra Tirtha, Raghuttama Tirtha, Raghavendra Tirtha, and Vadiraja Tirtha. His masterpiece, Nyaya Sudha or Nectar of Logic, deals with refuting an encyclopaedic range of philosophies that were in vogue at the time. Pereira notes "His monumental Nectar of Logic is one of the pinnacles of Indic theological achievement". Dasgupta remarks "Jayatirtha and Vyasatirtha present the highest dialectical skill in Indian thought".

== Brindavana ==
Shri Jayatirtha entered Brindavana alive in the 14th Century on the bank of the holy river Kagina, a tributary of the Bhima River at Malkheda, Kalaburagi district. Shri Jayatirtha's Brindavana lies between the Brindavanas of Akshobhya Tirtha, and Raghunatha Tirtha. Every year thousands of people attend the Aradhana festival from different states of India.

== Bibliography ==
- Sharma, B. N. Krishnamurti (2000). A History of the Dvaita School of Vedānta and Its Literature, Vol 1. 3rd Edition. Motilal Banarsidass (2008 Reprint). ISBN 978-8120815759.
- Sheridan, Daniel P (1995). Great Thinkers of the Eastern World. Harper Collins. ISBN 978-0062700858.
- Dasgupta, Surendranath (1991). A History of Indian Philosophy, Vol 4. Motilal Banarsidass. ISBN 978-8120804159.
- Dalal, Roshen (2010). Hinduism: An Alphabetical Guide. Penguin Books India. ISBN 978-0143414216.
- Sharma, B.N.K (2001). Nyayasudha of Sri Jayatirtha (3 vols). Vishwa Madhva Parishad. ASIN B0010XJ8W2.
- Pereira, Jose (1976). Hindu theology: A reader. Image Books. ISBN 978-0385095525.
- Chang, Chen-chi (1991). A Treasury of Mahāyāna Sūtras: Selections from the Mahāratnakūṭa Sūtra. Motilal Banarsidass. ISBN 978-8120809369.
- Sharma, B. N. Krishnamurti (1986). Philosophy of Śrī Madhvācārya. Motilal Banarsidass (2014 Reprint). ISBN 978-8120800687.
- Leaman, Oliver (2006). Encyclopedia of Asian Philosophy. Routledge. ISBN 978-1134691159.
- Dalmia, Vasudha; Stietencron, Heinrich von (2009). The Oxford India Hinduism Reader. Oxford University Press. ISBN 9780198062462.
