= Dvaita literature =

Hindu philosophy literature

Dvaita literature is literature that contributes to the Dvaita school of thought, founded by Sri Madhvacharya.

== Authors ==
=== Madhvacharya ===
For a complete list, see Works of Madhvacharya

- Brahma Sutra Bhashya
- Anu Bhashya
- Anu Vyakhyana
- Nyaya Vivarna
- Mahabharata Tatparya Nirnaya
- Gita Bhashya

=== Padmanabha Tirtha ===
- Sanyaya Ratnavali
- Sat-tarka-Deepavali
- Commentories on 10 Prakaranas
- Commentory on Gita Bhashya
- Madhwashtaka
- Also believed to have written a marvellous work of 1100 verses called Vayuleelavistarana

=== Trivikrama Panditacharya ===
- Hari Vayu Stuti
- Vishnu Stuti
- Poornabodha Stotra
- Tatvapradeepa (Commentory on Acharya Madhva's Brahma-sutra-Bhashya)

=== Narayana Panditacharya ===
- Sri Madhva Vijaya
- Sangraha Ramayana
- Prameya Nava Malika
- Shiva Stuti
- Narasimha Stuti

=== Jayatirtha ===
For a complete list, see Works of Jayatirtha

- Nyaya Sudha
- Tattva Prakashika
- Prameya Deepika
- Nyaya Deepika
- Dashaprakarana Tika
- Padyamala
- Shat-prashna UpanishadBhashya tika
- Ishavashya-UpanishadBhashya Tika
- Rg-Bhashya Tika

=== Sripadaraja ===
- Vagvajra (A commentary on Jayatirtha's Nyaya Sudha)
- Bhramaragita
- Venugita
- Gopigita

=== Vyasatirtha ===
- Nyayamritam
- Tarkatandava
- Tatparya Chandrika
- Mayavada Khandana Mandaramanjari
- Upadhi Khandana Mandaramanjari
- Prapancha Mithyatvanumana Khandana Mandaramanjari
- Tattvaviveka Mandaramanjari
- Bhedojjivana
- Sattarkavilasa

=== Vijayindra Tirtha ===
- Adhikaranamala
- Adwaitha Shiksha
- AitarEyopanishad bhashya Vyakya
- Ananda taratamya vadarthah
- Anubhashya Tippani
- Anuvyakyana Tippani
- Appayya kapolachapetika
- Brahmasootra Nyayasangraha
- Bruhadaranyopanishad bhashya vyakya
- Bheda vidyavilasah
- Bheda Prabha
- Bheda Sanjeevini
- Bhedaagama Sudakara
- Bheda chintamani (Bhedakalpataru)
- Bheda kusumanjali
- Bhedaprabha (Bhedarathnaprabha)
- Bhuttoji Kuttanam
- Chakra meemamsa
- Chandrikodahrutha Nyayavivaranam
- Chandogyopanishad bhashya vyakya
- Dwasuparnam ityaadinam Bedaparatva samarthanam
- Eashavasyopanishad bhashya Teeka Tippani
- Geeksharaartha:
- Geetabhashya prameyadeepika vyakya
- Geethatatparya nyaayadeepika vyakyanam
- Kathalakshana teeka vyakhya
- Karma Nirnaya Teeka Tippani
- KaTakopanishad bhashya Vyakya
- Kenopanishad bhashya Teeka
- Kuchodya kutharah
- Lingamoolanveshana khandanam
- Madhwadhwa kantakoddharah
- Madhwa siddhantha sarodharah
- Mandookopanishad bhashya vyakya
- Mayavada Kandana Teeka Tippani
- Meemasa nyaaya koumudee
- Mityatvanumanu Kandana Teeka Tippani
- Mundakopanishat Bhashya Vyakya
- Narasimha stutih
- Narayana shabdartha Nirvachanam
- Nyayadeepika tippani
- Nyayavivarana tippani
- Nyaayamrutha Gurvamoda
- Nyaayadhwa Deepika
- Nyaayamrutha Nyayarathnamala
- Nyaayamruta Madhyamamodha
- Nyayamrutaamoda
- Nyaaya moukthikamala
- Nyayamala (Chandrikavyakhya)
- Nyaya champakamala
- Nyayamruthodahruitha Jaimineeya Nyayamala
- Nyayasudha vyaakyaa bindu:
- Nyayamukurah
- Nayanamanjaree
- Omkara vaadaartha
- Paapavimochana stotram (Duritapahara stotra)
- Padartha sangrahah
- Pancha sanskara deepika
- Parameyadeepika tippani
- Paratattva prakashika
- Pramana paddhathi vyakhya
- Pramana lakshana teeka vyakhya
- Pranava darpana khandanam
- Pishtapashu Meemamsa
- Panchasamskara deepika
- Ramanuja matha reethya Sootrartah
- Rugbhashya Tippani
- Sarva siddhantha saraasaara vivekah
- Sanmarga deepika
- Shruthi taatparya Koumudee
- Shruti Tatva prakashika
- Shruthyartha saara:
- Shaivasarvasva khandanam
- Siddhantha saraasara vivechanam
- Shatprashnopanishad bhashya Teeka Tippani
- Sripadarajashtakam
- Shravana Vidhivilaasa:
- Sri Vyasaraja Stotram
- Subhadra Dhananjayah (Kavya)
- Sootraartha sangraha
- Taittareeyopanishad bhashya Teeka
- Tattvamanikya petika (Tattvaprakashika tippani)
- Tureeya Shivakhandanam
- Tattvasankhyana teekavyakhya
- Tattvodyotha goodhabhava prakashah
- Tatparya Chandrika Vyakya
- Tatparya Chandrika bhooshanam
- Tatparya Chandrika Kuchodya KuTara
- Upasamhara vijayah
- Ubhayagrasta Rahoodayah (Play)
- Upadhikandana Teeka Tippani
- Vaadamalika
- Vagvaikharee
- Virodhoddharah
- Vishnu Stuti Vyakyana
- Vishnu tattva nirnaya teeka
- Vyasaraja vijayah (Kavyaa)
- Yukti ratnakara (tarkatandava vyakya)

=== Vadiraja Tirtha ===
- Rukminishavijaya
- Yukti Mallika
- Mahabharata Prasthana which includes two important works 1) Mahabharata Lakshalamkara and 2) Commentary on Mahabharata Tatparya Nirnaya of Madhvacarya
- Svapna Vrundavanakhyana
- Gurvartha Dipika a sub-commentary on Sri Jayatirtha's Nyaya Sudha & Tatva Prakashika
- Dashavatara Stuti
- Krishna Stuti
- Hayagriva Sampada Stotra
- Nava Graha Stotra
- Thirtha prabandha

=== Raghuttama Tirtha ===
- Viṣṇutattvanirṇayaṭikā Bhavabodha
- Tattvaprakāśikā Bhavabodha
- Nyāyavivaranaṭikā Bhavabodha
- Nyāyaratna-Sambandhadipikā
- Bṛhadāraṇyakopaniṣad Bhasya Bhavabodha
- Vivaraṇoddharā Bhavabodha
- Gītābhāṣya Prameyadīpikā Bhavabodha
- Sanyayavivruthi Bhavabodha
- Anuvyakyana Nyāyamāla Brahma Sutra Sambandhapradīpā
- Tāratamya Stotram
- Taittirīya Vinirnaya

=== Raghavendra Tirtha ===
- Vedatraya Vivrutti (Khandartha On Rig, Yajur and Saama Veda)
- Mantrartha Manjari (Commentary on first 40 Rig Veda Suktas)
- Panchasookatha Vyakhya (Short glosses on various suktas)
- Aitreya Upanishad Mantrartha Sangraha
- Isha Upanishad Khandartha
- Brihadaranyaka Upanishad Khandhartha
- Katha Upanishad Khandhartha
- Taittiriya Upanishad Khandhartha
- Talavakara Upanishad Khandhartha
- Chandogya Upanishad Khandhartha
- Satprashna Upanishad Khandhartha
- Manduka Upanishad Khandhartha
- Mandukya Upanishad Khandhartha
- Tattva Prakashika Bhavadeepa
- Nyayasudhaa Parimala
- Tantra Dipika (Independent commentary on Sutras, aimed at a systemised unified interpretation)
- Tattva Manjari (Teeka on Anu Bhasya)
- Nyaya Muktavali
- Bhatta Sangraha(Commentary on Purva Mimamsa Sutras)
- Prameya Dipika
- Gita Vivrutti (Verse by verse commentary on the Bhagavad Gita)
- Mahabharata Tatparya Nirnaya Bhava Sangraha (32 Slokas summarising Mahabharata Tatparya Nirnaya)
- Sri Rama Charitra Manjari
- Sri Krishna Charitra Manjari
- Tattva Sankhyana Teeka Bhavadvipa
- Tattvodyota Teeka Bhavadvipa
- Karma Nirnaya Teeka Bhavadvipa
- Vishnu Tattva Nirnaya Teeka Bhavadvipa
- Pramana Lakshana Tika Bhavadvipa
- Katha Lakshana Tika Bhavadvipa
- Pramana Padhatti Vykhya
- Vadavali Vakhya
- Prameya Navamalika
- Nyayadeepa
- Chandrika Prakasha
- Prameya Sangraha
- Tithi Nirnaya
- Prathasankalpa Gandyam
- Sarva Samarpana Gadyam

=== Satyanatha Tirtha ===
- Abhinava Chandrika
- Abhinavamrutha
- Abhinava Tandava
- Abhinava Gada
- Nyaya Sudha Parashu

=== Purandara Dasa ===
- Four Lakh seventy five thousand Devaranamas (devotional songs)

=== Kanaka Dasa ===
- Nala Charitre
- Hari Bhakti Sara
- Rama Dhanya Charitre
- Mohana Tarangini

=== Satyapriya Tirtha ===
- Mahābhāṣya Vivarana
- Chandrika Bindu

=== Satyadharma Tirtha ===
- Tattvasaṁkhyāna Tippani
- Namaka Chamaka Vyakhyana
- Shreemadbhagavata Tippani
- Viratparva Tippani
- Udyoga Parva Tippani
- Ramayana Tippani
- Virahimodasudhavyakhyan
- Vishnutatvanirnaya Teeka tippani

=== Satyadhyana Tirtha ===
- Gitasarasangraha
- Gitapradhipadarthachadrika
- Bheda Paranyeva Khalu Brahma Sutrani
- Chandrikamandanam
- Gita Vimarsha
- Brahma Sutra Vimarsha
- Advaita Branti Prakasha
- Gita Lekhana Mala
- Bhasma Dharana Nisheda tathaa Urdvapundra Dharanam
- Sudarshana Mahatmya
- Sabhasara Sangraha Part I (civil suit), II and III (Kannada)
- Geethopanyasagalu (Kannada)

== Important references ==
- Vedas
- Bhagavata
- Upanishads
- Pancharatra
- Mahabharata
- Ramayana
- Brahma Sutras

== See also ==
- Dvaita
