= Satyanatha Tirtha =

17th-century Indian philosopher

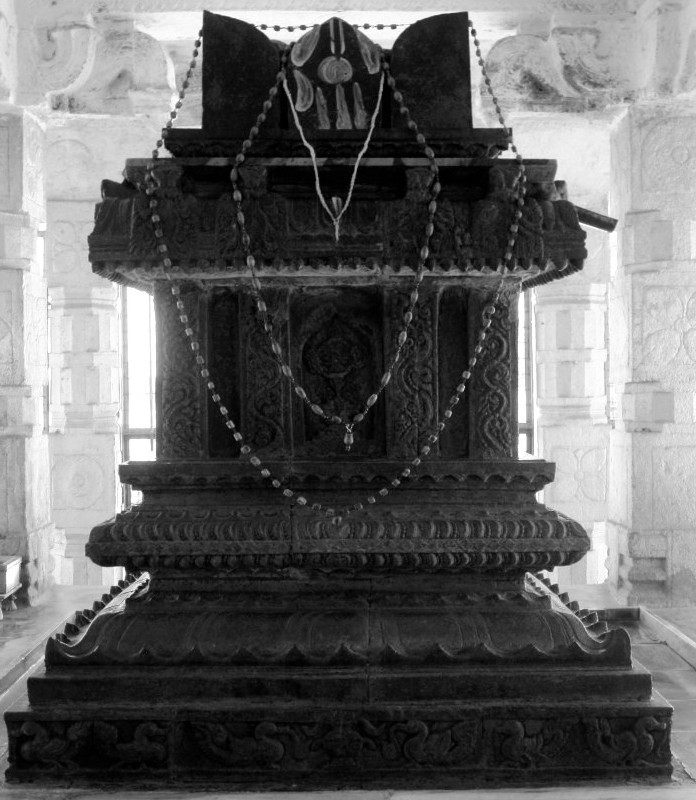
- Brindavana (tomb) of Satyanatha Tirtha at Veeracholapuram

Personal life
- Born: Narasimhacharya Avadhani; 1648 Miraj (present-day Sangli district, Maharashtra)
- Died: 1674 (aged 25–26) Veeracholapuram (present-day Viluppuram district, Tamil Nadu)
- Resting place: Veeracholapuram
- Parents: Krishnacharya Avadhani (father); Rukmini Bai (mother)
- Notable work(s): Abhinava Gada, Abhinava Tandava, Abhinava Chandrika
- Honors: Abhinava Vyasaraja, Abhinava Chandrikacharya

Religious life
- Religion: Hinduism
- Order: Vedanta (Uttaradi Math)
- Philosophy: Dvaita, (Note: Dvaita (द्वैत) is a Sanskrit word for "duality" or "dualism".) Vaishnavism

Religious career
- Teacher: Satyanidhi Tirtha
- Successor: Satyabhinava Tirtha
- Disciples: Satyabhinava Tirtha, Srinivasa Kavi, Chalari Narasimhacharya

Satyanatha Tirtha (also known as Satyanatha Yati) (Sanskrit:सत्यनाथा तीर्थ); IAST:Śrī Satyanātha Tīrtha) (c.1648 – c.1674), also called Abhinava Vyasaraja, was a Hindu philosopher, scholar, theologian, logician and dialectician belonging to the Dvaita order of Vedanta. He served as the twentieth pontiff of Uttaradi Math from 1660 to 1673. He was a fiery and prolific writer and very ambitious of the glory of Dvaita Vedanta. He is considered to be one of the stalwarts in the history of the Dvaita school of thought, on account of his sound elucidations of the works of Madhvacharya, Jayatirtha and Vyasatirtha. Three of his polemically themed doxographical works (Abhinavamruta, Abhinava Chandrika and Abhinava Tarkatandava) are reminiscent of "Vyasatraya" (the three eyes of the man-lion of Madhva Siddhāntha). His refutation work Abhinava Gada is a devastating criticism of Appayya's Madhvamathamukhamardhana. (Note: Some sources also spell the name as Madhvamatamukhamardana or Madhvamatamukhamardanam.) (Note: B.N.K. Sharma noted a similarly named work Madhvamatamukhamardana, attributed to Nimbarka. So not to be confused with that.) His independent treatise Abhinava Chandrika is considered a brilliant work relating to the Brahma Sūtras, being a commentary on Jayatirtha's Tattvaprakashika. His work Abhinava Tarka Tandava refuted the works of rival systems, especially those of Prabhākara of Mimamsa, Ramanuja's Visistadvaita, and Gangesha Upadhyaya, Raghunatha Siromani of the Nyaya school, on the same lines as Vyasatirtha's Tarka Tandava. Indologist B.N.K.Sharma wrote, "His energy and determination to crush out the rivalry of Monism is reflected even in the choice of the titles of some of his works, four of which go by the name "Paraśus" (the Axe)".

Born into a family of scholars, Satyanatha Tirtha studied the six orthodox schools of Hinduism and subsequently, the philosophy of Dvaita under Satyanidhi Tirtha of Uttaradi Math, eventually succeeding him as the pontiff. B.N.K.Sharma wrote, "Satyanatha Tirtha made a bold pronouncement that women and Shudras are eligible for Aparokshajnana exclusively through shravana of Tantra". Sharma also wrote, "Satyanatha holds the memory of Vyasatirtha in warm admiration and refers him reverentially as Vyāsatīrthasrimaccaranah". He composed 12 works, consisting of commentaries on the works of Madhva, Jayatirtha and Vyasatirtha, and several independent treatises criticizing the tenets of contemporary schools, especially Advaita, while simultaneously elaborating upon the Dvaita thought. His dialectical skill and logical acumen is often compared with that of Vyasatirtha.

== Historical sources ==
Information about Satyanatha Tirtha is derived from hagiographies: Satyanāthabhyudaya by Chalāri Saṁkarṣaṇacārya (a disciple of Satyabhinava Tirtha); Konkanabyudaya of Sagara Ramacharya and Sri Satyanatha Tirtharu (a biography in Kannada) by S.K. Badrinath. Indologist B.N.K.Sharma wrote, "His victorious career formed the subject of a eulogy by Chalāri Saṁkarṣaṇacārya, in his Satyanatha Mahatmya Ratnakara". Satyanatha Abhyudaya consists of eleven cantos and two manuscripts of this work are noticed by German Indologist Theodor Aufrecht which he quoted in his book Catalogus Catalogorum. B.N.K. Sharma opined the Satyanatha Abhyudaya is same as Satyanatha Mahatmya Ratnakara that was quoted in the Konkanabyudaya of Sagara Ramacharya. In Konkanabyudaya the author cited numerous Smritis and letters patent and bulls issued by Keladi rulers and pontiffs of some of the mutts at Udupi and of Satyabhinava Tirtha, Satyanatha Tirtha and others. The Alaṅkāramauktikamālā of Kṛṣṇa is another work which eulogises Satyanatha Tirtha.

== Biography ==
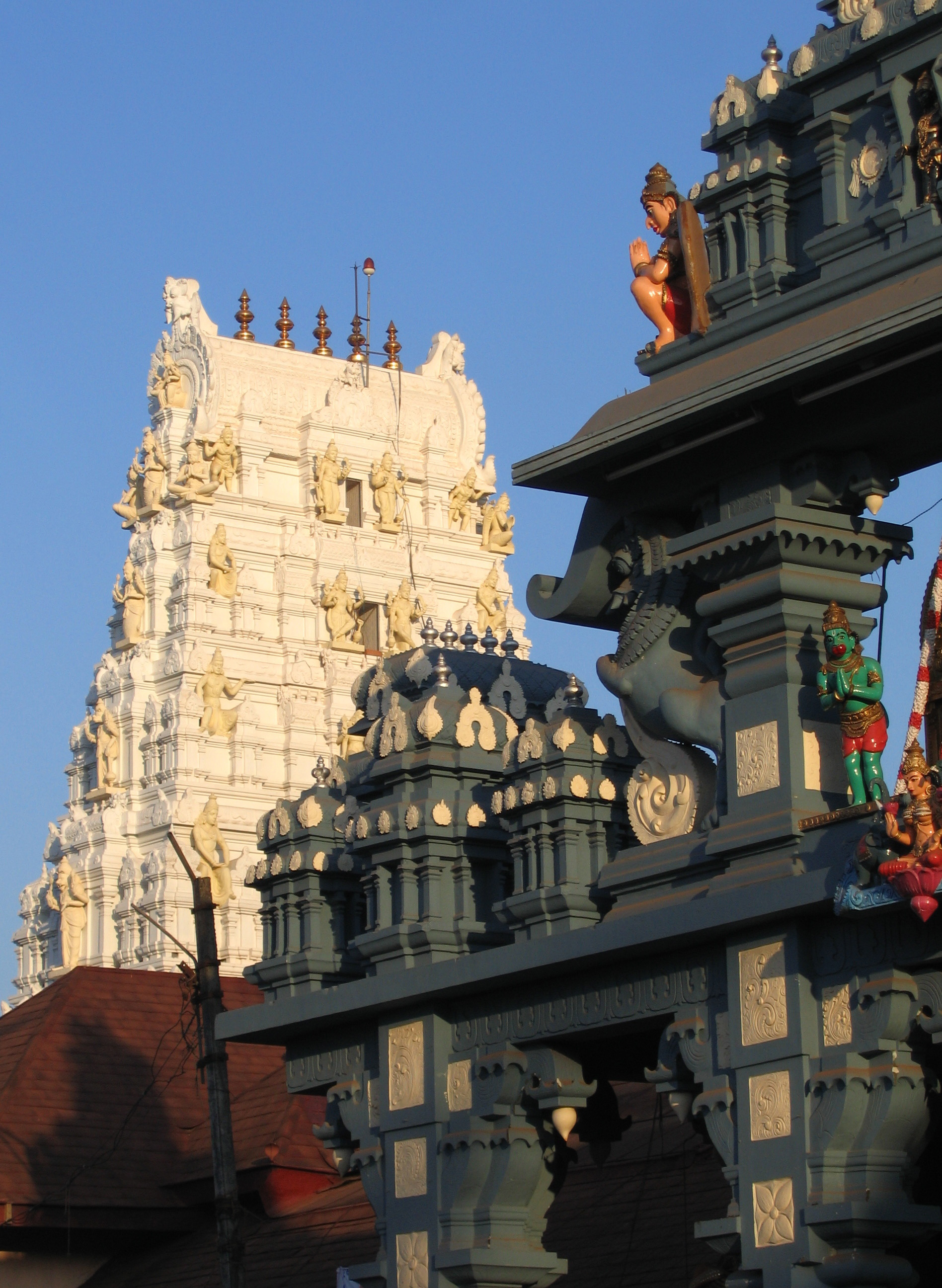
Udupi Sri Krishna Matha, a centre of Madhva Siddhanta

B.N.K. Sharma says, (Note: Abhinava Tarkatandava's Anumanakhandana was published by Kesavacarya in 1968. B.N.K. Sharma took the Bhumika section of this work about Satyanatha Tirtha's early life' as a reference.) Satyanatha Tirtha was originally named Narasimhacharya. He was born into a Deshastha Brahmin family of scholars in 1648 in Miraj, now in the southern part of Maharashtra. His father's name was Krishnacharya Avadhani and his mother's name was Rukmini Bai. Before becoming pontiff of the monastic institution Uttaradi Math, he was known by three names after taking Sannyasa. He was first ordained Sannyasa as an ordinary ascetic with the name Vidyanatha Tirtha by Krishnadwaipayana Tirtha (the disciple of Vedavyasa Tirtha), for second time he was named Ranganatha Tirtha by Dandaparivritti of Vedanidhi Tirtha and finally for the third time by Satyanidhi Tirtha, with the name Satyanatha Tirtha. In 1660 he took the seat of Uttaradi Math as the peetadhipathi, taking the name Satyanatha Tirtha.

According to the account in Sagara Ramacharya's Koñkanasthabhyudaya, Satyanatha Tirtha visited Benares at a time when Mughal emperor Aurangazeb was harassing the Hindus there. The same work says that he was a contemporary of Keladi Chennamma (queen of Keladi) and Aurangazeb. According to Sharma, it was presumably during this time that he visited Gaya and strengthened the hold of his mutt among the Gayapalas, who had been converted to Madhvism by his predecessor Vidyadhisha Tirtha. Satyanatha ordained sannyasa to Keshavacharya (the Purvashrama name of Satyabhinava Tirtha) in 1673. In the same year Satyabhinava Tirtha succeeded Satyanatha Tirtha as the pontiff of Uttaradi Math. After Satyanatha Tirtha died in 1674, his mortal remains were enshrined in the mutt at Veeracholapuram, a village in Tamil Nadu.

== Works ==
"Satyanatha Tirtha was a powerful and prolific writer and a noted controversialist in logic and theology."

— Indologist B. N. Krishnamurti Sharma on Satyanatha Tirtha

Satyanatha Tirtha authored twelve works, consisting of polemical tracts, commentaries on the works of Madhva, Jayatirtha, independent works and a few hymns. The manuscripts are preserved in mutts at Veeracholapuram, Bangalore and Tirukoilur. Satyanatha wanted to emulate the example and philosophical work that had been accomplished by Vyasaraja. His work Abhinavamrita is a commentary on Jayatirtha's Pramana-Paddhati. Pramana-Paddhati is an epistemological work that discusses pramanas from the point of view of Dvaita Vedanta. His work Abhinavachandrika is composed on the same lines of Vyasatirtha's Tatparya Chandrika, which is a commentary on Jayatirtha's Tattvaprakasika, which apart from elucidating the concepts of the source text, criticises the allegations against Madhva raised by Appaya Dikshita and other grammarians. His work Abhinavatandava or Abhinavatarkatandava is polemical tract written on same lines of Vyasatirtha's Tarka Tandava. Satyanatha Tirtha also wrote glosses on the three Khandanas of Madhva. His commentaries on Dasaprakaranas texts are called Parasu, which is an indication of his intention to cut the opponents arguments to pieces. His works are referred as the Abhinava Granthas and Parashu Granthas.

Name	Description	References
Abhinava Chandrika	Commentary on Jayatirtha's Tattva Prakāśikā.	
Abhinavamrutha	Gloss on Pramāṇa-Paddhatī of Jayatirtha	
Abhinava Tarka Tandava	Independent polemical tract targeted towards the Visistadvaita, Mimamsa and Nyaya schools of Hindu philosophy	
Abhinava Gada	Refutation of the works of Appayya Dikshita	
Māyāvādakhaṇḍana Parasu	Gloss on Māyāvādakhaṇḍana of Madhva	
Mithyatvanumana Khandana Parasu	Gloss on Mithyatva-anumana Khandana of Madhva	
Upaadhi Khandana Parashu	Gloss on Upaadhi Khandana of Madhva	
Nyaya Sudha Parashu	Commentary on Nyaya Sudha of Jayatirtha	
Vijayamala	Treatise on disconnected topics of general and special interests by taking certain passages from Brahma Sutra Bhasya, Māyāvādakhaṇḍanaṭikā, Mahabharata Tatparya Nirnaya and Nyayamrutha of Madhva, Jayatirtha and Vyasatirtha	
Karmaprakashika	Gloss on Karmaṅirṅayaṭikā of Jayatirtha	
Rupavatara Tippani	Commentary on Ṛgbhāṣya Ṭikā of Jayatirtha	

=== Abhinava Chandrika ===
Abhinava Chandrika is a well-known commentary on Jayatirtha's Tattva Prakasika, which in turn is a commentary on Madhva's Brahma Sutra Bhashya (which is a bhashya or a commentary on Badarayana's Brahma Sūtras). It is his magnum opus which runs to 12,500 stanzas. It is not in continuation of Tatparya Chandrika but an independent gloss, covering those portions (ch. I-II) commented upon by Vyasatirtha. Satyanatha refers in one of his introductory verses (no. 4) to Padmanabha Tirtha's Sattarkadipavali. 'In contrast to Vyasatirtha's Tatparya Chandrika, Satyanatha Tirtha here sets forth the Purvapaksha and Siddhanta views under each adhikarņa (or chapter), and offer criticisms on the former in accordance with the views of his teacher Satyanidhi Tirtha. B.N.K Sharma wrote, "His dextrous way of explaining the example of "Ahikundala" (Note: Example of "serpent and the coil". Ahikundala here means 'coil'.) by constructing the term "vísesha" used by Jayatirtha in Tattvaprakasika in his twin senses of "visesa" and "bheda" is a masterstroke of resourcefulness".

=== Abhinava Gada ===
Abhinava Gada ("The New Mace") is a polemical and expositional work in five chapters. It is a refutation work for the theological controversies provoked by Appayya Dikshita by his work Madhvamatamukhamardanam and runs to 4,750 stanzas. American historian Anthony Grafton and classicist Glenn W. Most says, Abhinava-Gada is like a new mace which broke the heads of non-dualists like Appayya Dikshita. B.N.K. Sharma wrote, "Abhinava Gada is a devastating criticism of Appaya's Madhvamatamukhamardhanam. He takes a bold stand on several points regarding interpretation of original texts he is commenting and anticipates fresh objections against the originals and knocks them down. He is fond of what he calls interpolations and corruptions in the texts and suggests his own emendations and justifies them with gusto".

=== Abhinava Tandava ===
Abhinava Tandava ("The New Dance of Logic") or Abhinava Tarkatandava is a polemical tract targeted towards the Nyaya school. It is a voluminous work and is considered a dialectical classic of Satyanatha Tirtha. It expounds the nature and constitution of the logical and epistemological categories of the Dvaita system and refutes those of rival systems, especially those of Nyaya-Vaisheshikas, on the same lines of the original Tarka Tandava of Vyasatirtha. The work runs to 11,367 stanzas.

== Legacy ==
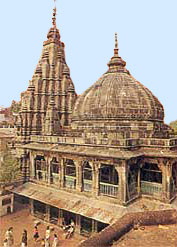
Vishnupad Temple in Gaya, where Gayawal Pandas are priests

Satyanatha Tirtha is considered to be one of the foremost stalwarts of Dvaita thought. He is revered for his philosophical and dialectical thought, and his role in spreading the school of Dvaita across the subcontinent, especially in Bihar. B.N.K. Sharma wrote: "A memorable personality in many ways, a fierce, very ambitious and prolific writer". Satyanatha Tirtha has been eulogised by Chalāri Saṁkarṣaṇacārya in his biographical works Satyanatha Abhyudaya and Satyanatha Mahatmya Ratnakara. Indologist and professor Dr. R. Nagaraja Sarma considered Satyanatha Tirtha, along with Trivikrama Panditacharya and Keshavacharya, prominent scholars who wrote expository and controversial works unrivalled for their brilliance and systematic treatment. Historian Ramesh Chandra Majumdar wrote that Satyanatha Tirtha, Vadiraja Tirtha and Raghavendra Tirtha were the great scholars who enriched the literature of Dvaita considerably by their numerous contributions. Valerie Stoker considered Satyanatha Tirtha along with Vijayendra Tirtha, Vadiraja Tirtha, Raghavendra Tirtha and Narayanacharya as prominent Dvaita intellectuals, who responded to their rivals critiques throughout sixteenth and seventeenth centuries.

=== Spread of Dvaita ===
B.N.K. Sharma credited Satyanatha Tirtha with converting remaining Gayapalas and strengthening the hold of Madhva Siddhanta among the Gayawala Pandas of Gaya, who had been converted to Madhvism by his predecessor Vidyadhisha Tirtha.

=== Scholarly influence ===
Satyanatha Tirtha was significantly influenced by Vyasatirtha, Jayatirtha, Padmanabha Tirtha and Madhva, in that he borrowed from their style and method of enquiry. He exerted considerable influence on his successors. Satyadhyana Tirtha's Chandrikamandana derives some of its aspects from Abhinava Chandrika. Satyabhinava Tirtha's Durghata Bhavadipa, an exhaustive commentary on the Madhva's Bhagvata Tatparya Nirnaya, borrows some of its aspects from Satyanatha Tirtha's oeuvre.

== Sources ==
- Bhatnagar, O.P. (1964). Studies in social history: modern India. University of Allahabad.
- Grafton, Anthony; Most, Glenn W. (2016), Canonical Texts and Scholarly Practices: A Global Comparative Approach, Cambridge University Press, ISBN 978-1107105980
- Glasenapp, Helmuth Von (1992). Madhva's Philosophy of the Viṣṇu Faith. Dvaita Vedanta Studies and Research Foundation.
- Lutjeharms, Rembert (2018). A Vaisnava Poet in Early Modern Bengal: Kavikarnapura's Splendour of Speech. Oxford University Press. ISBN 978-0192561930.
- Majumdar, Ramesh Chandra (1974). The History and Culture of the Indian People: The Mughal empire. Bharatiya Vidya Bhavan.
- Mesquita, Roque (2008). Madhva's quotes from the Purāṇas and the Mahābhārata: an analytical compilation of untraceable source-quotations in Madhva's works along with footnotes. Aditya Prakashan. ISBN 978-8177420821.
- Monier-Williams, Monier (1872). A Sanskrit-English Dictionary: Etymologically and Philologically Arranged with Special Reference to Cognate Indo-European Languages. Delhi: Motilal Banarsidass (originally published by Oxford University Press). ISBN 978-8120831056.
- Nakamura, Hajime (1983). A History of Early Vedānta Philosophy, Part 2. Motilal Banarsidass. ISBN 978-8120806511.
- Potter, Karl H. (1983). The Encyclopedia of Indian philosophies, Volume 1 (1995 Reprint). Motilal Banarsidass. ISBN 978-8120803084.
- Prabhupada, A. C. Bhaktivedanta Swami (1975), Sri Caitanya-caritamrta, Madhya-lila: The Pastimes of Lord Caitanya Mahaprabhu, The Bhaktivedanta Book Trust, ISBN 978-9171496621
- Samuel, G. John (1997). Contribution of Karaṇāṭaka to Sanskrit. Institute of Asian Studies. LCCN 99931373.
- Sarma, R. Nagaraja (1956). Tattvaprakāśikā-vyākhya Bhavabodhah. Government Oriental Manuscripts Library. (in Sanskrit and English)
- Sarma, R. Nagaraja (2008). Reign of Realism: English Exposition of Daśaprakaranas of Śrī Ānandatīrtha, Volume 2. Dvaita Vedanta Studies and Research Foundation.
- Sharma, B. N. Krishnamurti (2000). A History of the Dvaita School of Vedānta and Its Literature, Vol 1. 3rd Edition. Motilal Banarsidass (2008 Reprint). ISBN 978-8120815759.
- Sharma, B. N. Krishnamurti (1986). The Brahma Sutras and Their Principal Commentaries. Munshiram Manoharial Publishers Private Limited. ISBN 9788121500340.
- Stoker, Valerie (2016). Polemics and Patronage in the City of Victory. University of California Press. ISBN 978-0-520-29183-6.
