= Sumatindra Tirtha =

Scholar from Tamilnadu state, INDIA

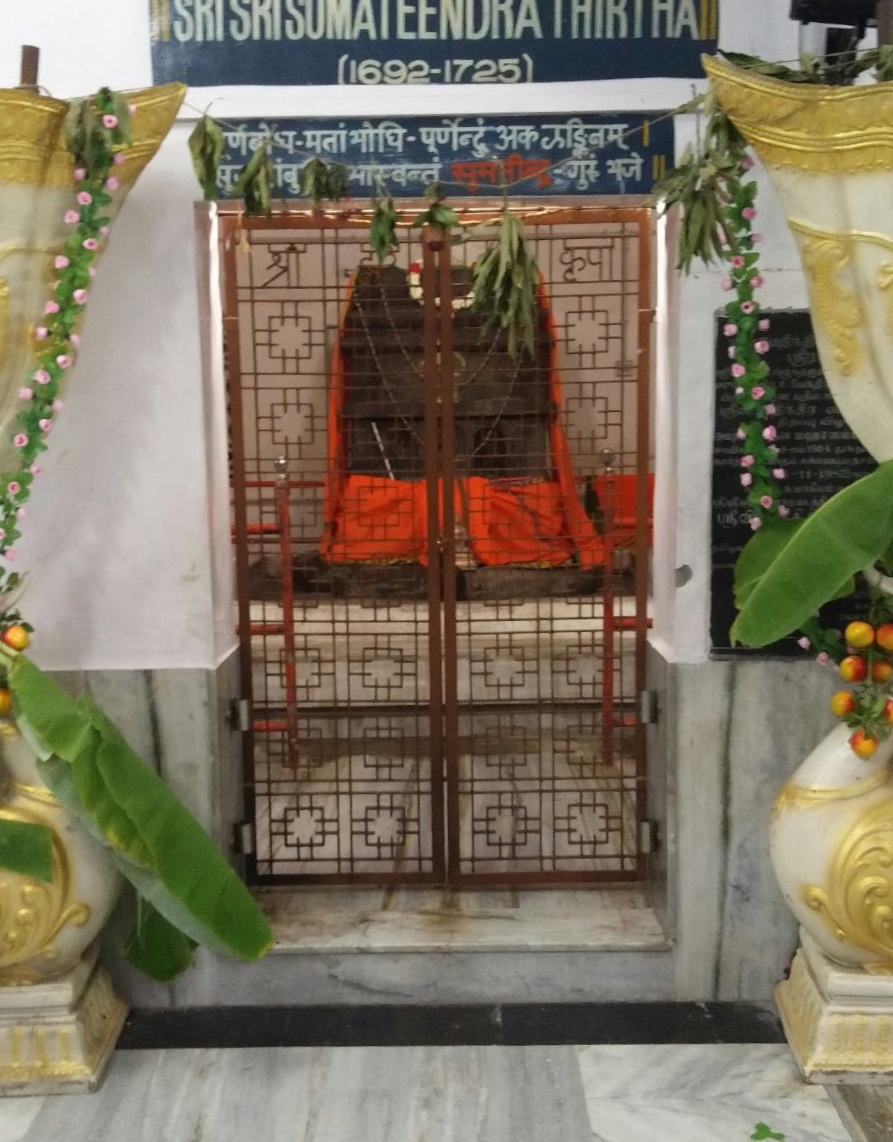
- The tomb or Brindavana of Sumatindra Tirtha in Srirangam

Personal life
- Notable work(s): Bhavaratnakosha, Usha Harna Bhashya, Jayaghoshana

Religious life
- Religion: Hinduism
- Order: Vedanta
- Philosophy: Dvaita

Religious career
- Teacher: Venkatanarayana, Surindra Tirtha
- Disciples: Upendra Tirtha

Sumatindra Tirtha (c. 1692 – c. 1725) was a Dvaita scholar and the 20th pontiff of the Madhva matha at Kumbakonam (also known as Raghavendra Matha). Succeeding Surindra Tirtha in 1692, Sumatindra extended the reach of the matha from Kumbakonam to Thanjavur, Madurai and Srirangam. Through his travels and a close association with the royalty, Sumatindra was able to proliferate the principles of Dvaita in the Tamil region. An accomplished scholar and poet, he has authored numerous works on poetics, drama and music as well as commentaries on Vedanta.

== Life ==
Born as Muddu Krishnacharya, he seems to have studied tarka (Logic), vyakarana (grammar) and mimamsa (scriptural injunctions) under the guidance of Raghavendra though he considers his father, Venkatanarayana, as his teacher. His two brothers Yogindra and Surindra served as pontiffs of the matha before him. He took on the name of Sumatindra after his initiation into sannyasa. Through his travels in the present day Karnataka and Telangana, he engaged in debates and discussions with Advaita and Dvaita scholars alike. He maintained cordial relationship with the Madurai Nayaks and the Thanjavur Marathas as evidenced by grants made in his name. Queen Mangamma of Madurai granted him the hamlet of Ayirdharma and lands in the town of Srirangam where he built his matha. Under his aegis, the matha also received a part of the tithes from Payaranipalyam and other neighboring villages. His panegyric on the Thanjavur ruler Sahaji I indicates familiarity with the ruler. Succeeded by Upendra Tirtha, he is entombed in Srirangam.

== Works ==
Sumatindra's works span a wide range of subjects, from alankara (poetics) to vedanta. He has authored commentaries on the works of Jayatirtha and Vyasatirtha, while quoting from a variety of sources including Puranas and obscure works from pontiffs of the yore, Padmanabha and Narahari. In the realm of poetics, he has authored a commentary on the works of Sudhindra Tirtha and Trivikrama Pandita, an early disciple of Madhva. His Shahavilasa is a treatise on music while his Abhinavakadambari is a poetic work.

=== Works on the Brahmasutra ===
Name	Description	References
Bhavaratnakosha	Commentary on Tattva Prakashika of Jayatirtha	
Rg Bhashya	A non-extant commentary on Rg Bhashya of Jayatirtha	
Vakyarathnakosha	Commentary on Nyaya Sudha of Jayatirtha	
Adhikaranaratnamala	Summary of the Brahma Sutra	
Tantrasara Bhashya	Commentary on Tantrasara of Madhva	

=== Works on the Alamkara and Kavya ===
Name	Description	References
Madhudhara	Commentary on Alamkara Manjari of Sudhindra Tirtha	
Rasikaranjini	Commentary on Ushaharana of Trivikrama Pandita	
Vyasaraja Vijaya Bhashya	Commentary on Vyasaraja Vijaya of Vijayindra	
Subhadra Parinaya Bhashya	Annotations on the drama Subhadra Parinaya by Vijayindra	
Yogindra Vijaya	Panegyric on his predecessor, Yogindra Tirtha	
Shahavilasa	Treatise on music	
Abhinavakadambari	A poetic work	
Jayaghoshana	Panegyric on Sahaji I	

=== Short metrical verse ===
Name	Description	References
Yogindra Taravali	A metrical work recounting the deeds of Yogindra Tirtha	
Rama Taravali	A metrical work praising the life and deeds of Rama	
Ramadandaka	Verse in praise of the tutelary deity of the Kumbakonam matha	
Narasimha Stuti	Verse in praise of Narasimha	

== Bibliography ==
- Sharma, B.N.K (2000) [1961]. History of Dvaita school of Vedanta and its Literature (3rd ed.). Bombay: Motilal Banarasidass. ISBN 81-208-1575-0.
- Sarma, Nagaraj (1945). Bheda Vidya Vilasa. Nanjangud: Sri Parimala Publishing House.
- Sriramamurti, P. (1972). Contribution of Andhra to Sanskrit Literature. Andhra University.
- Pandurangi, K.T (1963). A Descriptive Catalogue of Sanskrit Manuscripts.
- Sastri, P.P.S (1929). A Descriptive Catalogue of Sanskrit Manuscripts of the Government Oriental Manuscripts Library.
- Devadevan, Manu (2016). A Prehistory of Hinduism. Walter de Gruyter GmbH & Co KG.
- Krishnamachariar, M (1939). History of Classical Sanskrit Literature. Tirupati-Tirumala Devasthanam Press.
