= Advaita Kalanala =

Sanskrit work on Dvaita philosophy written by Narayanacharya

- Author: Narayanacharya
- Language: Sanskrit
- Subject: Hindu philosophy
- Genre: Dvaita Vedanta
- Publisher: Original: 17th century
- Publication place: India

Advaita Kalanala (Sanskrit: अद्वैत कालानल; Advaitakālānala) is a Sanskrit work on Dvaita philosophy written by Narayanacharya. It is a refutation work for the theological controversies provoked by Appayya Dikshita's on Madhva Siddhanta. It runs to 8000 granthas (stanzas).

== Overview ==
According to Indologist B. N. Krishnamurti Sharma, the first chapter of the work critiques Advaita metaphysics. It questions its approach to epistemology (Pramanas), its three tiered distinction of reality, and highlights doctrinal disagreements among Advaita scholars. The second chapter responds to Appayya's criticisms of Madhva's interpretation of the Brahma Sutras. Narayanacharya defends Madhva against allegations of misrepresenting Vedic and Mimansa principles, relying on untraceable Śruti and Smriti texts, and making grammatical errors. Narayanacharya counters these claims to assert the grammatical and interpretive validity of Madhva's works. The third and fourth chapters justify Madhva's Purvapaksha on the opening section (adhikarana) of the Brahma Sutras. The final chapter addresses Appayya's critiques of the subsequent four Adhikaranas and concludes with a general defense of Madhva's Brahma Sutra Bhashya. Sharma notes that Narayanacharya's deep familiarity with Advaita literature allowed him to effectively counter Appayya Dikshita's arguments. According to Sharma, the text successfully defends the structural soundness of Madhva's interpretations.

== Legacy ==
Indologist B. N. K. Sharma writes, "The Advaitakālānala is a scathing criticism of the Madhvamatamukhamardana of Appayya. The carping criticisms and bitter personal attacks of the Dikshita are vigorously returned by Narayana. He loses no opportunity to pay the critic in his coin and with compound interest. The tone of the work is thus retaliatory and bitingly sarcastic". American historian Anthony Grafton and classicist Glenn W. Most considered the work Advaitakālānala along with the Abhinava-Gada of Satyanatha Tirtha as a new mace which broke the heads of non-dualists like Appayya Dikshita.

== Bibliography ==
- Sharma, B. N. Krishnamurti (2000). A History of the Dvaita School of Vedānta and Its Literature, Vol 1. 3rd Edition. Motilal Banarsidass (2008 Reprint). ISBN 978-8120815759.
- Grafton, Anthony; Most, Glenn W. (2016), Canonical Texts and Scholarly Practices: A Global Comparative Approach, Cambridge University Press, ISBN 978-1107105980
