= Chalari Narasimhacharya =

Indian scholar

Personal life
- Born: Chalari Narasimhacharya

Religious life
- Religion: Hinduism
- Philosophy: Dvaita Vedanta, Vaishnavism

Religious career
- Teacher: Satyanatha Tirtha

Chalari Narasimahacharya was an Indian Hindu scholar in the Dvaita Vedānta tradition. He is the follower of Uttaradi Math and the disciple of Satyanatha Tirtha.

== Early life ==
Chalari Narasimahacharya was born in Chalari (reported to be village near Malkhed) into a family of scholars to Chalari Narayanacharya, who was the disciple of Satyanidhi Tirtha. The members of the Chalari family are evidently all disciples of Uttaradi Math.

== Works ==
Chalari Narasimahacharya is a prolific writer and over 15 works are ascribed to him.

- Tattva Sankhyana Tippani, a commentary on Tattva Sankhyana of Madhva
- Isaupanishad bhashya, a commentary on Isaupanishad bhasya of Madhva
- A commentary on Pramana Padhati
- A commentary on Sadachara Smriti of Madhva
- Commentaries on Shiva Stuti, Parijathapaharana and Sangraha Ramayana of Narayana Panditacharya
- Brahmasutrarthadhikaranasamgraha, A commentary on Brahma Sutra Bhashya of Madhva
- Brihattaratamya Stotra
- Bhattojjidiksitakritikuttanam
- A commentary on Bhagavata Tatparay Nirnaya of Madhva
- A commentary on Rigbhashyatika of Jayatirtha
- Smrityarthasagara
- Sabdikakanthamani

== Bibliography ==
- Sharma, B. N. Krishnamurti (2000). A History of the Dvaita School of Vedānta and Its Literature, Vol 1. 3rd Edition. Motilal Banarsidass (2008 Reprint). ISBN 978-8120815759.
- Glasenapp, Helmuth Von (1992). Madhva's Philosophy of the Viṣṇu Faith. Dvaita Vedanta Studies and Research Foundation.
