= Sudhindra Tirtha =

Dvaita philosopher of aesthetics

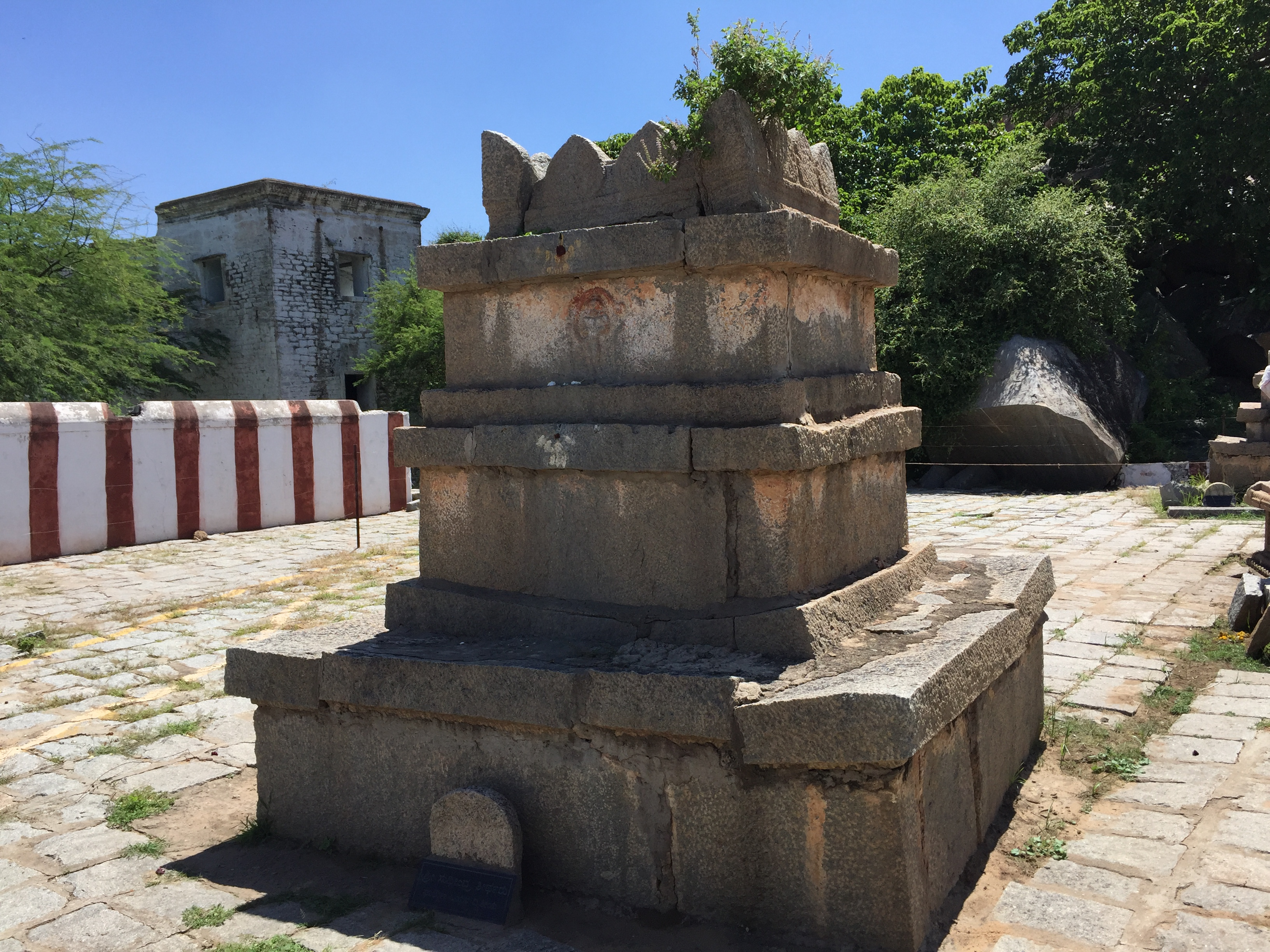
- The tomb or Brindavana of Sudhindra Tirtha in Anegundi, Gangavathi

Personal life
- Notable work(s): Alamkara Manjari, Madhudhara, Subhadra Dhananjaya

Religious life
- Religion: Hinduism
- Order: Vedanta
- Philosophy: Dvaita

Religious career
- Teacher: Vijayendra Tirtha
- Successor: Raghavendra Tirtha

Sudhindra Tirtha (c.1596 - c.1623) was a Dvaita philosopher of aesthetics, dramatist and the pontiff of the matha at Kumbakonam. Unlike his predecessors who mainly dealt with polemics and theology, most of his written works deal with Kavya (poetry), Alankara (figure of speech) and Nataka (drama), which is considered unique in history of Dvaita literature. He is also notable as a disciple of Vijayendra Tirtha, engaging in scholarly debates across the subcontinent and for mentoring Raghavendra Tirtha who succeeded him as the pontiff of the matha at Kumbakonam. Regarding his oeuvre in the context of Dvaita literature, Sharma notes "he was left us works of real merit, which stand out like oases in the dreary desert of theological writings". His works are characterised by alliterations, elegance and simplicity.

== Life ==
Information about his life mainly comes from Raghavendra Vijaya by Narayanacharya. Nothing is known about his early life. He served as a disciple of Vijayendra Tirtha whom he later succeeded as the pontiff of the matha at Kumbakonam in 1596. The text speaks of Sudhindra receiving patronage by the rulers Venkatapati Raya of Vijayanagara (Note: Quote from Mahalingam: "He is said to have conquered all his opponents at the court of Venkata and was honoured by the emperor by the presentation of the conch and other emblems of victory.") and Raghunatha Nayaka of Tanjavur (Note: Quote from Mahalingam: "[Sudhindra] was honoured by Raghunatha of Tanjore with a Kanakabhisheka ") indicating his influence and respectability as a holy man. There are records of him inducting Goud Saraswat Brahmin families of Cochin to the precepts of Dvaita and installing an idol of Venkateswara for their utility, implying his popularity among the people of that particular sect. Raghavendra Vijaya speaks of Sudhindra mentoring and grooming the young Venkatanatha (known later as Raghavendra Tirtha) to take up the mantle of sannyasa and succeed him as the pontiff. Sudhindra died in 1623 and his mortal remains are enshrined in Navabrindavana in Hampi.

== Works ==
Among his non-extant works is a commentary on Vyasatirtha's Tarkatandava called Sadyuktiratnakara, a commentary on Bhagavata Purana and a work on aesthetics entitled Madhudhara. Alamkara Manjari is a manual of figures of speech and metaphors. In the context of Indian poetics, alamkara can be translated to "literary ornamentation". Sudhindra demonstrates the aspects of alamkara by making his guru, Vijayendra, the subject of ornamentation and praise. His Alamkara Nikasa is a work of similar nature of enumerating and expanding upon different alamkaras. Views of different philosophers on the elements of Indian aesthetics such as rasa and kavya are consolidated and expanded upon. Sahitya Samrajya is a commentary on the original by Krsna Yajvan, who was a philosopher of poetics in the Tanjore court. The work is unique in the history of Dvaita literature in that, Sharma notes, "a Madhva ascetic and pontiff of Sudhindra's standing, should have come forward to comment on the work of a layman and a Smartha, laying aside all considerations of pontifical prestige and religious difference". Damaged fragments of a drama entitled Subhadra Dhananjya has been ascribed to him.

== Bibliography ==
- Sharma, B.N.K (2000) [1961]. History of Dvaita school of Vedanta and its Literature (3rd ed.). Bombay: Motilal Banarasidass. ISBN 81-208-1575-0.
- Kumar, Sushil (1923). Studies In The History Of Sanskrit Poetics. Vol. 1. Bombay: Bulletin of the School of Oriental and African Studies.
- Lal, Mohan (1992). Encyclopaedia of Indian Literature: Sasay to Zorgot. Sahitya Akademi. ISBN 9788126012213.
- Rao, V. Raghavendra (1956). Aspects of Dvaita Philosophy. Nanjangud: Parimala Publishing House.
- Sastri, K.S. Ramaswami (1966). Indian Aesthetics: Music and Dance. Sri Venkateswara University.
- Mahalingam, T.V. (1940). Administration and Social Life under Vijayanagar. University of Madras.
