= Satyapriya Tirtha =

Hindu guru

Personal life
- Born: Garlapad Ramacharya; 1701 Raichur, Karnataka
- Died: 1744 Manamadurai, Tamil Nadu
- Notable work(s): Mahābhāṣya Vivarana, Chandrika Bindu

Religious life
- Religion: Hinduism
- Order: Vedanta (Uttaradi Math)
- Philosophy: Dvaita, Vaishnavism

Religious career
- Teacher: Satyapurna Tirtha
- Predecessor: Satyavijaya Tirtha
- Successor: Satyabodha Tirtha
- Disciples: Satyabodha Tirtha, Shyama Kavi

Satyapriya Tirtha (c. 1701 – c. 1744) was an Indian Hindu philosopher, guru, scholar, yogi, mystic and the pontiff of Uttaradi Math, a math dedicated to Dvaita philosophy. He was the successor of Satyavijaya Tirtha and the 24th pontiff of Uttaradi Math from 1737—1744.

== Biography ==
Most of the information about Satyapriya Tirtha's life is derived from the various Vijaya kavyas. Satyapriya was born with a Sesha Amsa as Garlapad Ramacharya in 1701 in Raichur. Satyapriya Tirtha was initially given ashrama by Satyapurna Tirtha. Satyapriya Tirtha was the senior disciple of Satyapurna Tirtha and was the person who climbed the Tirupati Hills holding the hands of his Guru reciting the Nyaya Sudha. When Sri Satyapurna Tirtha fell ill, and Sri Satyapriya Tirtha was on tour to propagate Dvaita Philosophy, he ordained sannyasa to Satya Vijaya Tirtha. After 11 years of reign as pontiff of the Pontificate, he made over the Samsthana to Satyapriya Tirtha. From that time onwards Satyapriya Tirtha began to call Arani by the name Satyavijayanagaram. Satyapriya Tirtha is a man of miracles one such miraculous incident that took place during his time of Melkote Narasimha Temple Incident. When Satyapriya Tirtha climbed the hills of Melukote for the darshan of Lord Narasimha, he found the doors of the sanctum-sanctorum locked for the afternoon. On his very touch, the lock opened and the doors became ajar with a bang giving him the darshan of the Lord, to whom he prayed to his heart's content. He in his religious excursion vanquished all veteran Advaitic scholars. One very great scholar after admitting defeat openly became his follower. He was a poet of a very high order. He wrote a drama in praise of Satyapriya Tirtha, his guru. In all the events, he defends and establishes the philosophy of Satyapriya as unassailable from all points. The name of this drama "Prachand Rahoodaya" is very significant. In this book, he analyzed Dvaita, and Advaita, and eventually said that Dvaitha is superior, with Sri Satyapriya Tirtha as the hero. "Prachanda Rahoodaya" is a fine drama printed and published by Satyadhyana Vidyapeetha, Bombay a quarter of a century ago. Satyapriya Tirtha served the pontificate for seven years. Satyapriya Tirtha handed over the pontificate to one Ramacharya with the name Satyabodha Tirtha and took Jiva Samadhi in 1744. His mortal remains are enshrined in a mutt in Manamadurai.

== Works ==
Satyapriya Tirtha composed six major works, most of them are commentaries on the works of Madhva, Jayatirtha and Vyasatirtha and a praise poem.

- Mahābhāṣya Vivarana, a commentary on Mahābhāṣya of Patanjali
- Māṇḍūkya Upaniṣadbhāṣya, a commentary on Mandukya Upanishad
- Muṇḍaka Upaniṣadbhāṣya, a commentary on Mundaka Upanishad
- Tatvaprakashika Vivruthi, a commentary on Tattvaprakāśikā of Jayatirtha
- Chandrika Bindu, a commentary on Tätparya Chandrika of Vyasatirtha
- Sri Jayatirtha Stuti, a praise-poem on Jayatirtha

== Bibliography ==
- Sharma, B. N. Krishnamurti (2000). A History of the Dvaita School of Vedānta and Its Literature, Vol 1. 3rd Edition. Motilal Banarsidass (2008 Reprint). ISBN 978-8120815759.
- Raghavan, V. (1975). International Sanskrit Conference, Volume 1, Part 1. The Ministry.
- Rao, C. R. (1984). Srimat Uttaradi Mutt: Moola Maha Samsthana of Srimadjagadguru Madhvacharya.
- Krishna, Daya (2002). Developments in Indian philosophy from Eighteenth century onwards: classical and western. Project of History of Indian Science, Philosophy, and Culture. ISBN 978-8187586081.
- Potter, Karl H. (1995). Encyclopedia of Indian philosophies. 1, Bibliography : Section 1, Volumes 1-2. Motilal Banarsidass Publications. ISBN 978-8120803084.
- Majumdar, Ramesh Chandra; Pusalker, Achut Dattatrya (1977). The History and Culture of the Indian People: The Marath supremacy. Bharatiya Vidya Bhavan. p. 710.
- Bhattacharyya, Sibajiban (1970). The Philosophy of the Grammarians, Volume 5. Motilal Banarsidass Publ. ISBN 978-8120804265.
- Ritti, P. S. (1961). Saint of Savanur.
- Pandurangi, K. T. (2000), Vyāsatīrtha viracitā Tātparyacandrikā: Jayatīrthaviracita Tattvaprakāśikāyāḥ vyākhyānarūpā : Rāghavendra Tīrthaviracitā Prakāśikayā, Pāṇḍuraṅgi Keśavācāryaviracita Bhāvadīpikayā ca sahitā, Volume 3, Dvaita Vedanta Studies and Research Foundation
