= Advaita (disambiguation) =

Advaita Vedanta is a nondualist school of the Vedanta tradition of Hindu philosophy and religious practice.

Advaita or Adwaita may also refer to:

== Hinduism ==
- Advaita Acharya, 15th-century Indian Hindu religious leader
  - Advaita Parivāra, disciples and successors of Advaita Acharya
- Advaita Guru Paramparā, teachers of Advaita philosophy
- Advaita Kalanala, Dvaita Vedanta (dualist) Sanskrit text by Narayanacharya Vaishvanathi; criticizes Advaita Vedanta
- Advaitasiddhi, Advaita Vedanta text by Madhusūdana Sarasvatī
- Advait Mat, Hindu sects in northern India
- Ajātivāda, formlessness of God in Advaita Vedanta

== People ==
- Advaitha (actress), Indian actress in Tamil cinema
- Advait Chandan, Indian film director
- Advaita Kala, Indian writer
- Adwaita Mallabarman (1914–1951), Indian writer in Bengali

== Others ==
- Advaita (band), New Delhi-based Indian fusion band
- Advaita (festival), Indian Institute of Technology, Bhubaneswar
- Advaitha (film), 2013 Indian Kannada-language film
- Adwaita, giant tortoise at Zoological Garden, Alipore, Kolkata, India
- Adwaita (design language), design language of the GNOME Desktop Environment

== See also ==
- Adhwaytham, 1992 Indian film
- Advaita Ashrama, branch of the Ramakrishna Math
- Advaitananda, disciple of the 19th-century Indian Hindu religious leader Ramakrishna
- Advaitanand Ji, Indian spiritual guru
- Kashmir Shaivism, nondualist Hindu tradition of Kashmir
- Neo-Advaita, Hindu religious movement
- Neo-Vedanta, 19th-century interpretations of Hinduism based on Vedanta
- Shiva Advaita, Shaivite Hindu school in southern India
