= Narayanacharya Vaishvanathi =

Indian scholar

Narayanacharya

Personal life
- Born: Narayanacharya Vaishvanathi Present day North Karnataka
- Died: Present day North Karnataka
- Notable work: Advaita Kalanala

Religious life
- Religion: Hinduism
- Philosophy: Dvaita, Vaishnavism

Religious career
- Teacher: Vedavyasa Tirtha

Narayanacharya Vaishvanathi (IAST:Nārāyaṇācārya Vaisvānati; was a 16th century Indian scholar and philosopher of Dvaita Vedānta tradition. He was the disciple of Vedavyasa Tirtha of Uttaradi Math and is the most celebrated name in the annals of the great dvaita-advaita debate. Narayanacharya is notable for his work Advaita Kalanala, which is a refutation work to Madhvamatamukhamardana of Appayya Dikshita. Indologist B. N. K. Sharma writes, "The Advaita Kalanala is a scathing criticism of the Madhvamatamukhamardana of Appayya. The carping criticisms and bitter personal attacks of the Dikshita are vigorously returned by Narayana. He loses no opportunity to pay the critic in his coin and with compound interest. The tone of the work is thus retaliatory and bitingly sarcastic". Sharma also writes, "Narayanacharya was one of the fiery champions of the Dvaita school, that rose to defend it against the slashing attacks of Appayya Dikshita and others". American historian Anthony Grafton and classicist Glenn W. Most considered the work Advaita Kalanala along with the Abhinava-Gada of Satyanatha Tirtha as a new mace which broke the heads of non-dualists like Appayya Dikshita.

== Life ==
Almost nothing is known about Narayanacharya's early life but according to some hagiographies he was born in North Karnataka and his father name was Vishvanatha. Tradition asserts that Narayanacharya was the elder brother of Vyasa Ramacharya, who was the author of the famous Nyayamrta Tarangini. Indologist B. N. K. Sharma says, Narayanacharya gives about himself is that he is "Vaishvānathih", son of Vishvanatha and his guru was Vedavyasa Tirtha of Uttaradi Math in the sixth introductory verse of his Madhvamantrarthamanjari. Scholar Gaudagiri Gopalakrishnacharya said the same and scholar Vyasanakere Prabhanjanacharya supported this in the December and January issues of Tattvavada (1979–1980). Tarangini Ramacharya has given us ample information about himself about his father name Vishvanatha, his gotra Upamanyu, and his family surname "Vyasa", besides mentioning that he had an elder brother Nārāyaṇācārya who was a veteran scholar in Vyakarana and other Shastras and that he had his scholastic training under him.

== Works and legacy ==
Narayanacharya authored three works consisting of polemical tracts, commentary and Independent treatise. Except Advaitakalanala his two other works, Madhvamantrarthamanjari and Vishnutattvaviveka remaines unprinted.

=== Advaita Kalanala ===
Advaitakālānala is a polemical and expositional work in five chapters and runs to about 8,000 stanzas. It is a refutation work for the theological controversies provoked by Appayya Dikshita by his work Madhvamatamukhamardana. Indologist B. N. Krishnamurti Sharma says, "In this work carping, criticisms, and bitter personal attacks of the Dikshita are vigorously returned by Narayanacharya". Sharma writes, "He writes a vigorous and animated style, full of repartees, spicy anecdotes, and colorful analogies. Indologist B. N. K. Sharma writes, "The work is could be pronounced to be a thoroughgoing and final refutation of Dikshita's work".

== Bibliography ==
- Sharma, B. N. Krishnamurti (2000). A History of the Dvaita School of Vedānta and Its Literature, Vol 1. 3rd Edition. Motilal Banarsidass (2008 Reprint). ISBN 978-8120815759.
- Grafton, Anthony; Most, Glenn W. (2016), Canonical Texts and Scholarly Practices: A Global Comparative Approach, Cambridge University Press, ISBN 978-1107105980
- Bhattacharya, Sibajiba (1970). The Encyclopedia of Indian philosophies, Volume 1. Motilal Banarsidass.
- Devadevan, Manu V. (2016). A Prehistory of Hinduism. Walter de Gruyter GmbH & Co KG. ISBN 978-3110517378.
- Fisher, Elaine M. (2017), Hindu Pluralism: Religion and the Public Sphere in Early Modern South India, University of California Press, ISBN 978-0520293014
