= Satyabhinava Tirtha =

Hindu saint and scholar

Śrī Śrī 1008 Śrī Satyabhinava Tirtha Śrīpād

Personal life
- Born: Keshavacharya
- Died: 1706 Nachiarkoil, Present day Tamil Nadu

Religious life
- Religion: Hinduism
- Order: Vedanta (Uttaradi Math)
- Philosophy: Dvaita, Vaishnavism

Religious career
- Teacher: Satyanatha Tirtha
- Successor: Satyapurna Tirtha
- Disciples: Satyadhiraja Tirtha, Satyadhisha Tirtha, Satyapurna Tirtha, Chalari Seshacharya

Satyabhinava Tirtha (died 1706) was a Hindu philosopher, scholar, theologian and saint. He served as the pontiff of Shri Uttaradi Math from 1673 to 1706. He was the 21st in succession from Madhvacharya. He is known for his great works Durghata Bhavadipa on Bhagavata Tatparya Nirnaya and Mahabharata Tatparya Nirnaya Vyakhyana, a commentary on Mahabharata Tatparya Nirnaya of Madhva .

== Life ==
According to hagiographies, He was born as Keshavacharya into a Kannada-speaking Deshastha Madhva Brahmin family. Satyabhinava Tirtha who was born with a 'Madhavi Rishi amsa' had occupied the pontificate with distinction for 32 years, 6 months and three days. Satyadhisha Tirtha was the first and Satyadhiraja Tirtha was second disciple. Both these died within a year of their ordination. Later he ordained Kolhapur Krishnacharya as the next pontiff as Sri Satyapurna Tirtha. After his death in 1706, his mortal remains were enshrined in the mutt at Nachiarkoil, which is few miles away from Kumbakonam. He was succeeded by Satyapurna Tirtha.

== Works ==
Three works have been attributed to Satyabhinava. His Mahabharata Tatparya Nirnaya Vyakhyana is a commentary running up to 3,220 granthas on Mahabharata Tatparya Nirnaya of Madhva. Duraghatabhavadipa is a commentary running up to 8,160 granthas on Madhva's Bhagavata Tatparya Niryana which, apart from elucidating the concepts of the source text, criticises the allegations against Madhva raised by some scholars and grammarians. His work Sri Satyanatha Guru Stuti is a praise poem in honour of his guru Satyanatha Tirtha. Sharma says, "Almost on every page of his gloss in his Bhagavata, we find certain criticisms on the Bhagavata Tatparya Nirnaya of Madhva repudiated. The determination and persistence with which he pursues these critics show that Bhagavata Tatparya Nirnaya had been severely criticized by some latter-day commentators probably Advaitic of unknown identity. The commentary throws light on many knotty points. Its special interest lies in hunting up the criticisms against the Bhagavata Tatparya, and silencing them".

== Bibliography ==
- Sharma, B. N. Krishnamurti (2000). A History of the Dvaita School of Vedānta and Its Literature, Vol 1. 3rd Edition. Motilal Banarsidass (2008 Reprint). ISBN 978-8120815759.
- Rao, C. R. (1984). Srimat Uttaradi Mutt: Moola Maha Samsthana of Srimadjagadguru Madhvacharya.
- Dasgupta, Surendranath (1975). A History of Indian Philosophy, Volume 4. Motilal Banarsidass. ISBN 978-8120804159.
- Potter, Karl H. (1995). Encyclopedia of Indian philosophies. 1, Bibliography : Section 1, Volumes 1-2. Motilal Banarsidass Publications. ISBN 978-8120803084.
