= Veeracholapuram =

Veeracholapuram Veerasozhapuram
- village
- Location within Tamil Nadu Location within India
- Coordinates: 11.9442594°N 79.2940003°E
- Country: India
- State: Tamil Nadu
- District: Kallakurichi
- Taluka: Villupuram
- Time zone: UTC+5:30 (IST)
- PIN: 605755
- Telephone code: 04146
- Vehicle registration: TN-21

Veeracholapuram is a village located near Kallakurichi in Kallakurichi district, Tamil Nadu, India.

== Temples ==
Veeracholapuram is also notable for the Brindavana of Satyanatha Tirtha, a Hindu saint and pontiff of Uttaradi Matha of Dvaita Order of Vedanta, who took samadhi in the year 1674 on the bank of river Dakshina Pinakini in this village.
