= List of works by Jayatirtha =

The number of extant works ascribed to Jayatirtha are 21 in numbers, 18 of which are commentaries on the works of the 13th century Hindu philosopher and theologian, Madhvacharya. He also crafted three significant independent treatises dealing with the epistemology of Dvaita philosophy and refutation of the ontological aspects of Advaita. His precise and lucid style of writing earned him the distinction of Tikacharya or commentator par-excellence. His works were heavily commented upon by subsequent Dvaita philosophers like Vyasatirtha, Vijayendra Tirtha, Vadiraja Tirtha, Raghuttama Tirtha, Raghavendra Tirtha and Satyanatha Tirtha.

== Commentaries on the works of Madhvacharya ==
Name	Description	References
Tattva-saṁkhyāna-ṭīkā	Commentary on Tattvasaṁkhyā	
Tattva-viveka-ṭīkā	Commentary on Tattvaviveka	
Tattvoddyota-ṭīkā	Commentary on Tattvoddyota	
Viṣṇu-tattva-nirṇaya-ṭīkā	Commentary on Viṣṇutattvanirṇaya	
Māyāvāda-khaṇḍana-ṭīkā	Commentary on Māyāvādakhaṇḍana	
Prapañca-mithyātvānumāna-khaṇḍana-ṭīkā	Commentary on Prapañcamithyātvānumānakhaṇḍana	
Upādhi-khaṇḍana-ṭīkā	Commentary on Upādhikhaṇḍana	
Pramāṇa-lakṣaṇa-ṭīkā	Commentary on Pramāṇalakṣaṇa	
Kathā-lakṣaṇa-vivaraṇa	Commentary on Kathālakṣaṇa	
Karma-nirṇaya-ṭīkā	Commentary on Karmanirṇaya	
Tattva-prakāśikā	Commentary on Brahma Sūtra Bhāṣya	
Nyāya Sudhā	Commentary on Anu Vyākhyāna	
Nyāya-vivaraṇa-ṭīkā	Commentary on Nyāyavivaraṇa	
Ṣaṭpraśna Upaniṣadbhāṣya Ṭīkā	Commentary on Ṣaṭpraśna Upaniṣadbhāṣya	
Īśa Upaniṣadbhāṣya Ṭīkā	Commentary on Īśa Upaniṣadbhāṣya	
Ṛg-bhāṣya Ṭīkā	Commentary on Ṛgbhāṣya	
Gītā-bhāṣya Prameya-dīpikā	Commentary on Bhagavad Gītā bhāṣya	
Gītā Tātparya Nyāyadipikā	Commentary on the Bhagavad Gītā Tātparya Nirṇaya	

== Independent works ==
Name	Description	References
Vādāvalī	Refutation of the Advaita concept of the illusoriness of the world.	
Pramāṇapaddhatī	Work on the epistemological aspects (Pramana) of Dvaita.	
Padyamālā	A small treatise dealing with the aspects of worship mentioned in Madhvacharya's Tantrasārasamgraha.	

== Bibliography ==
- Sharma, B. N. Krishnamurti (2000). A History of the Dvaita School of Vedānta and Its Literature, 3rd Edition. Motilal Banarsidass (2008 Reprint). ISBN 978-8120815759.
- Sheridan, Daniel P (1995). Great Thinkers of the Eastern World. Harper Collins. ISBN 978-0062700858.
- Dasgupta, Surendranath (1922). A History of Indian Philosophy, Vol 4. Motilal Banarsidass. ISBN 978-8120804159.
- Pandurangi, K.T (1992). "Visnutattvanirnaya with Jayatirtha's commentary" (in Kannada). Digital Library of India.
- Venkatachar, B (1964). "Tattvasankhyana with Jayatirtha's commentary" (in Sanskrit and English). Ramakrishnappa Dvaita Vedanta.
- Potter, Karl H. (1995). Encyclopedia of Indian Philosophies: Bibliography, Volume 1. Motilal Banarsidass. ISBN 978-8120803084.
- Rao, P. Nagaraja (1943). "Vadavali". Digital Library of India.
