= Satyavijaya Tirtha =

Indian philosopher

Sri Satyavijaya Tirtha
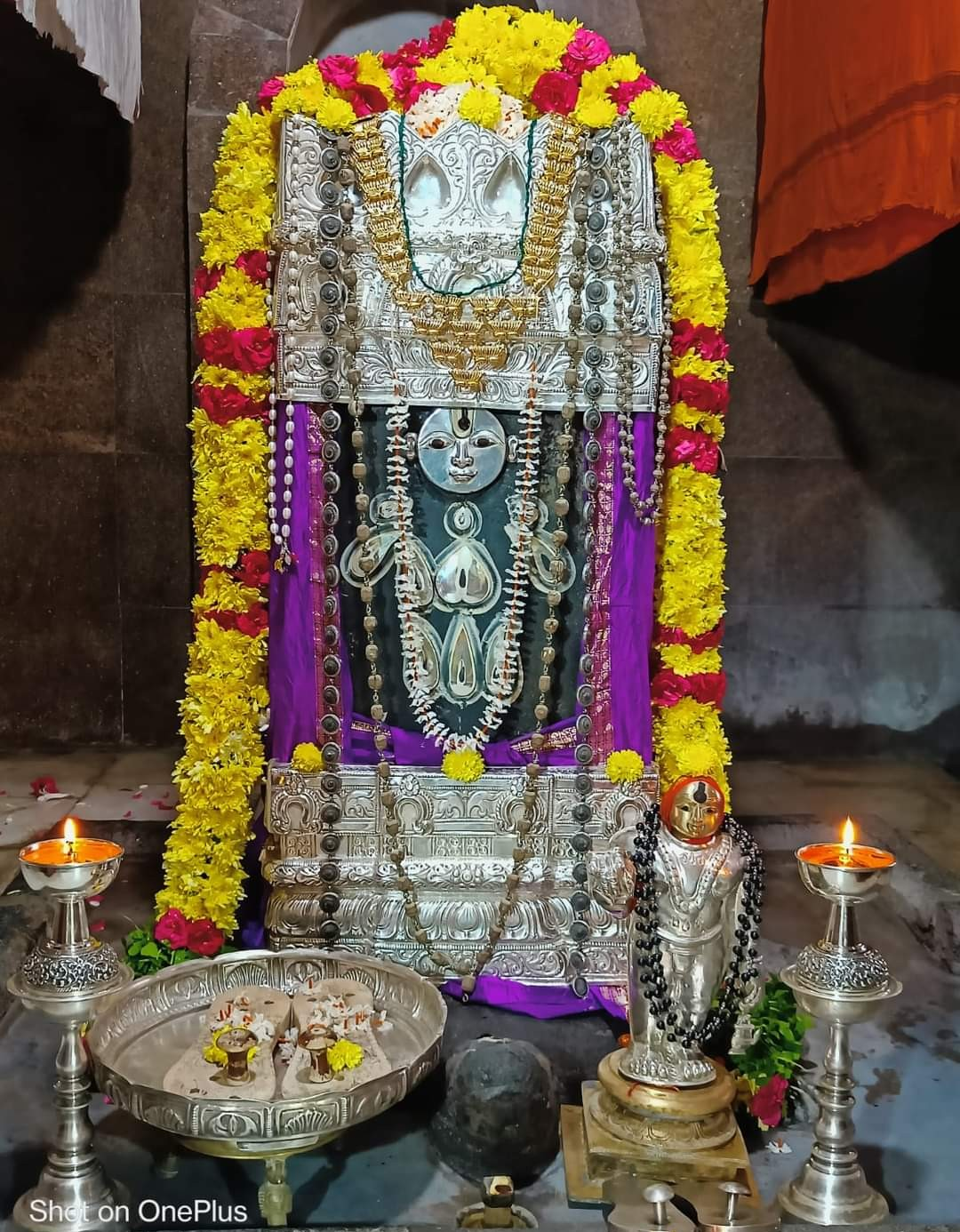
- Satyavijaya Tirtha Brindavana (tomb) at Satya Vijaya Nagaram, Tamil Nadu, India

Personal life
- Born: Pandurangi Balacharya
- Died: 1737 Sathiyavijayanagaram, Tiruvanamalai district, Tamil Nadu

Religious life
- Religion: Hinduism
- Order: Vedanta (Uttaradi Math)
- Philosophy: Dvaita, Vaishnavism

Religious career
- Teacher: Satyapurna Tirtha
- Predecessor: Satyapurna Tirtha
- Successor: Satyapriya Tirtha
- Disciples: Varkhed Timmannacharya

Shri Satyavijaya Tirtha (died 1737) (Śrī Satya-vijaya Tīrtha) was an Indian Hindu philosopher, guru, and scholar. He was the successor of Satyapurna Tirtha and the 23rd pontiff of Uttaradi Math since Madhvacharya, the chief proponent and the one who rejuvenated this Dvaita philosophy and served the pontificate from 1726–1737.

== Biography ==
According to hagiographies, Satyavijaya Tirtha was born Pandurangi Balacharya in a prominent family of scholars to Pandurangi Srinivasacharya. Satyavijaya Tirtha was given sanyasa by Satyapurna Tirtha with specific instructions that he, in turn, should hand over the Samsthana to his asrama senior Satyapriya Tirtha. Since Satyavijaya Tirtha was older in age he was given opportunity to be the Pontiff of Uttaradi Math after Satyapurna Tirtha. Satyavijaya Tirtha served as the pontiff of Uttaradi Math from 1726 - 1737. During this time according to manuscripts which dates to 1726 A.D Satyavijaya Tirtha was honoured in Varadharaja Perumal Temple, Kanchipuram with certain privileges. In 1737 he handed over the pontificate to Satyapriya Tirtha. He died in 1737 and his mortal remains are enshrined in a mutt in Satya Vijaya Nagaram (Arani) on the banks of river Kaveri.

== Legacy ==
- The village where his Brindavana (tomb) is located is named after him as Satya Vijaya Nagaram in Tamil Nadu.

== Bibliography ==
- Sharma, B. N. Krishnamurti (2000). A History of the Dvaita School of Vedānta and Its Literature, Vol 1. 3rd Edition. Motilal Banarsidass (2008 Reprint). ISBN 978-8120815759.
- Naqvī, Ṣādiq; Rao, V. Kishan (2005). A Thousand Laurels--Dr. Sadiq Naqvi: Studies on Medieval India with Special Reference to Deccan, Volume 2. Department of Ancient Indian History, Culture & Archaeology, Osmania University.
