= Satyapurna Tirtha =

Hindu scholar

Personal life
- Born: Kolhapur Krishnacharya; 1648
- Died: 1726 (aged 77–78) Kolpur (present day Mahbubnagar district of Telangana)

Religious life
- Religion: Hinduism
- Order: Vedanta (Uttaradi Math)
- Philosophy: Dvaita, Vaishnavism

Religious career
- Teacher: Satyabhinava Tirtha
- Successor: Satyavijaya Tirtha
- Disciples: Satyapriya Tirtha, Satyavijaya Tirtha

Satyapurna Tirtha (c.1648 - c.1726), (IAST:Satyapūrṇa Tīrtha), was a Hindu philosopher, scholar and saint. He served as the pontiff of Shri Uttaradi Math from 1706 to 1726. He was the 22nd in succession from Madhvacharya. Satyapurna Tirtha ruled the pontificate with a remarkable distinction. His life was a saga of supreme spiritual achievements.

== Life ==
Satyapriya was initially given ashrama by Satyapurna Tirtha. When Sri Satyapurna Tirtha fell ill, and Sri Satyapriya Tirtha was on tour to propagation of Dvaita Philosophy, he ordained sanyasa to Satya Vijaya Tirtha. After 11 years reign as peetadhipathi of the Pontificate he made over the Samsthana to Satyapriya Tirtha. From that time onwards Satyapriya Tirtha began to call Arani by the name Satyavijayanagaram. Even now it is well known by that name. The Brindavana of Satyapurna Tirtha is in Kolpur.

== Bibliography ==
- Sharma, B. N. Krishnamurti (2000). A History of the Dvaita School of Vedānta and Its Literature, Vol 1. 3rd Edition. Motilal Banarsidass (2008 Reprint). ISBN 978-8120815759.
- Rao, C. R. (1984). Srimat Uttaradi Mutt: Moola Maha Samsthana of Srimadjagadguru Madhvacharya.
- Naqvī, Ṣādiq; Rao, V. Kishan (2005). A Thousand Laurels--Dr. Sadiq Naqvi: Studies on Medieval India with Special Reference to Deccan, Volume 2. Department of Ancient Indian History, Culture & Archaeology, Osmania University.
- Devadevan, Manu V. (2016). A Prehistory of Hinduism. Walter de Gruyter GmbH & Co KG. ISBN 978-3110517378.
