= Satyanidhi Tirtha =

Hindu guru

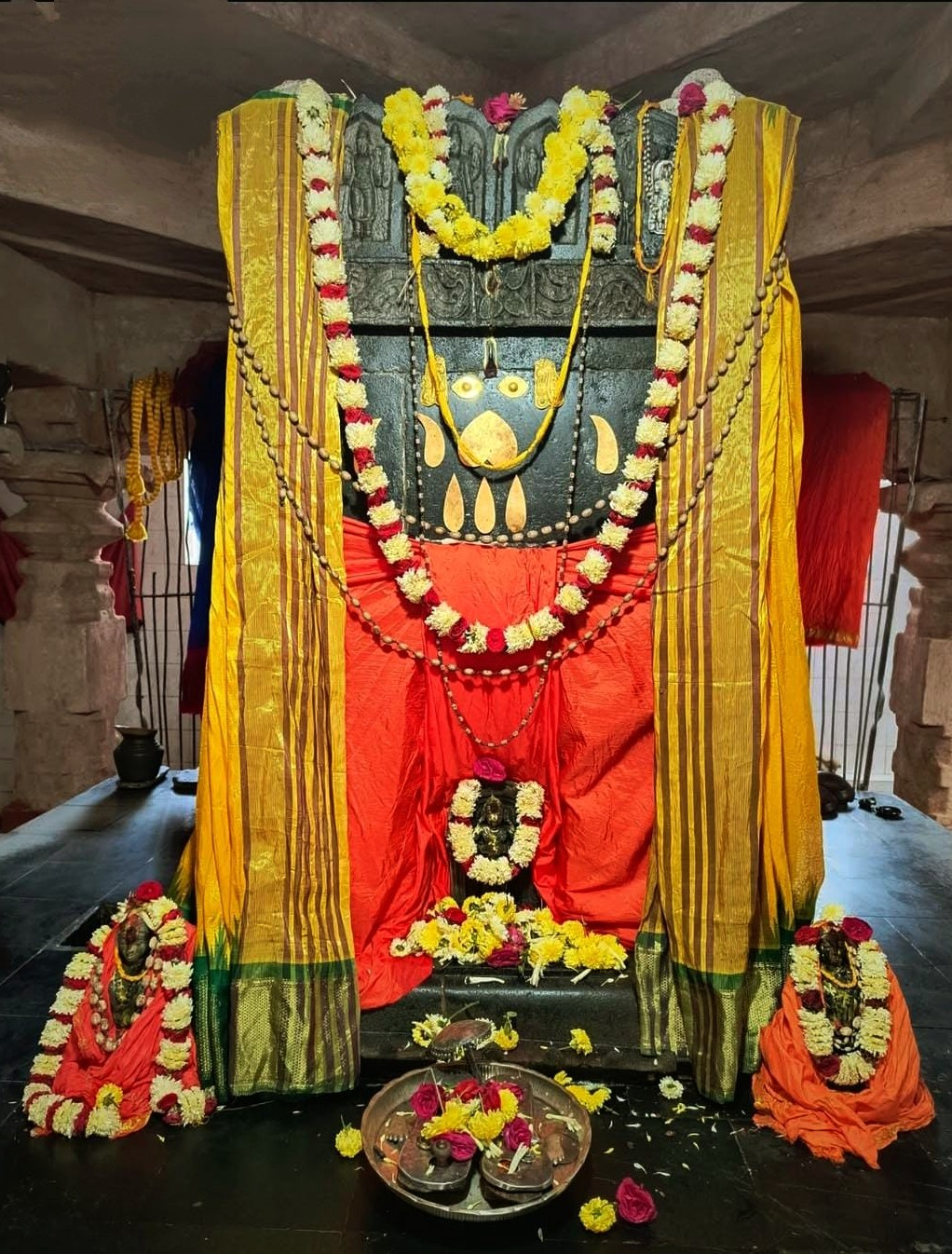
- Shri Satyanidhi Tirtha Moola Brindavana at Kurnool

Personal life
- Born: Kauligi Raghunathacharya; 1580 Puntamba (present-day Ahmednagar district, Maharashtra, India)
- Died: 1660 (aged 79–80) Kurnool (present-day Kurnool district, Andhra Pradesh, India)
- Resting place: Kurnool

Religious life
- Religion: Hinduism
- Order: Vedanta (Uttaradi Math)
- Philosophy: Dvaita, Vaishnavism

Religious career
- Teacher: Satyavrata Tirtha
- Successor: Satyanatha Tirtha
- Disciples: Satyanatha Tirtha, Satyananda Tirtha, Gunanidhi Tirtha, and Rama Tirtha.

Satyanidhi Tirtha (c.1580 - c.1660) was a Hindu philosopher, scholar and saint. He served as the pontiff of Shri Uttaradi Math from 1638–1660. He was the 19th in succession from Madhvacharya. Satyanidhi Tirtha ruled the pontificate with a remarkable distinction. His life was a saga of supreme spiritual achievements.

== Life ==
Most of the information about his life is derived from the biographical work Satyanidhivilasa by the Srinivasa, a disciple of Satyanidhi Tirtha. Born as Kaulagi Raghunathacharya into pious Deshastha Brahmin family of scholars to Purushothamacharya and Satyabai belonging to Mauna Bhargava Gotra in Puntamba, Maharashtra. He studied Vyakarana and Shastras under Kumbhari Vasudevacharya. He was ordained and was made the pontiff of Uttaradi Math in 1638. He served as pontiff of mutt for 21 years and 9 months. After his death in 1660, his mortal remains were enshrined in the mutt at Nivrutti Sangama. In 1970s, during construction of Srisailam dam, his mortal remains were shifted to Kurnool by Shri Satyapramoda Tirtha. He was succeeded by Satyanatha Tirtha.

== Works ==
Satyanidhi Tirtha authored three works consisting of commentaries on the works of Vyasatirtha and a few hymns. They are as follows:

- Bhedojjivana, a gloss on Bhedojjivana of Vyasatirtha
- Vayu Bharathi Stotra, a praise hymn on Vayu and Bharathi.
- Vishnu Sahasranama Vyakhyana, a commentary on Vishnu Sahasranama.

== Legacy ==
Satyanidhi Tirtha has been eulogised by Sarkara Srinivasa in his contemporaneous kavya Satyanidhivilasa, a kavya in honor of Satyanidhi in 8 cantos. His disciple Satyanatha Tirtha sets forth the Purvapaksa and Siddhanta views under each adhikarana, and offers criticisms on the former in accordance with the views of his teacher Satyanidhi Tirtha, in his work Abhinava Chandrika.

== Bibliography ==
- Sharma, B. N. Krishnamurti (2000). A History of the Dvaita School of Vedānta and Its Literature, Vol 1. 3rd Edition. Motilal Banarsidass (2008 Reprint). ISBN 978-8120815759.
- Dagens, Bruno (1984). Entre Alampur et Śrīśailam: recherches archéologiques en Andhra Pradesh, Part 1. Institut franc̜ais dʼindologie.
- Glasenapp, Helmuth von (1992). Madhva's Philosophy of the Viṣṇu Faith. Dvaita Vedanta Studies and Research Foundation.
- Dasgupta, Surendranath (1922). A History of Indian Philosophy, Vol 4. Motilal Banarsidass. ISBN 978-8120804159.
- Devadevan, Manu V. (2016). A Prehistory of Hinduism. Walter de Gruyter GmbH & Co KG. ISBN 978-3110517378.
