= Abhinava Gada =

Sanskrit work on Dvaita philosophy written by Satyanatha Tirtha

- Author: Satyanatha Tirtha
- Language: Sanskrit
- Subject: Hindu philosophy
- Genre: Dvaita Vedanta
- Publisher: Original: 17th century; Modern: Satyadhyana Tirtha
- Publication place: India

The Abhinava Gada (Sanskrit:अभिनवगदा); (Abhinava-gadā), is a Sanskrit work on Dvaita philosophy written by Satyanatha Tirtha. It is a refutation work for the theological controversies provoked by Appayya Dikshita's on Madhva Siddhanta.

== Contents ==
Abhinava-Gada consists of five-chapters designated Yuddhas (battles) with an obvious allusion to the Gada-yuddha between Bhima and Suyodhana. The intensely bellicose attitude of the author reflected even in the opening verse:

सदापेये दीक्षितस्य मृघे दुरभिमानिनः |
पातयामि शिरस्यद्य गुर्वी मभिनवां गदाम् ||

"They are always in the hunt for the initiated and are not proud of themselves. I'm dropping my heavy Abhinava Gada (new mace) on your head today."

== Overview ==
The Abhinava Gada is a polemical text consisting of 4,750 granthas, written to counter Appayya Dikshita's critique of Madhvacharya in his Madhvamukhamardanam. While earlier scholars such as Vijayendra Tirtha and Narayanacharya Vaishvanathi also authored refutations, Satyanatha Tirtha employed a different methodological approach. Unlike Vijayendra Tirtha, who defended Madhva's original texts and the subsequent commentaries as a unified, homogeneous tradition, Satyanatha Tirtha addresses Appayya Dikshita's criticisms by isolating Madhva's original writings. Satyanatha Tirtha generally avoids relying on the commentaries of Jayatirtha and Vyasatirtha, occasionally arguing that Madhvacharya should not be held responsible for the interpretations added by his successors. Anthony Grafton and Glenn W. Most writes, "The work Abhinava-Gada is a new mace which broke the heads of non-dualists like Appayya Dikshita".

== Bibliography ==
- Sharma, B. N. Krishnamurti (2000). A History of the Dvaita School of Vedānta and Its Literature, Vol 1. 3rd Edition. Motilal Banarsidass (2008 Reprint). ISBN 978-8120815759.
- Grafton, Anthony; Most, Glenn W. (2016), Canonical Texts and Scholarly Practices, Cambridge University Press, ISBN 978-1107105980
- Bhatta, C. Panduranga; Samuel, G. John (1997), Contribution of Karṇāṭaka to Sanskrit, Institute of Asian Studies
- Bhattacharya, Sibajiban (1970), The Encyclopedia of Indian philosophies, Volume 1, Motilal Banarsidass, ISBN 9788120804265
