= Tatparya =

Tatparya is a Sanskrit word which means "intention". This is most often used in the context of written material and is used to indicate the original intention of the author in putting down a certain statement. The innate possibility of multiple interpretations that the Sanskrit language allows for makes obtaining the "Tatparya" an involved subject.

Many Hindu scholars and philosophers have, over the years, written their decisions (Nirnaya in Sanskrit) on the Tatparya of various scripts such as the Mahabharata, Bhagavadgita, etc. The Mahabharata Tatparya Nirnaya by Sri Madhvacharya is one such work.

== See also ==
- Bhashya
