= Vidyadhisha Tirtha =

Indian philosopher and scholar

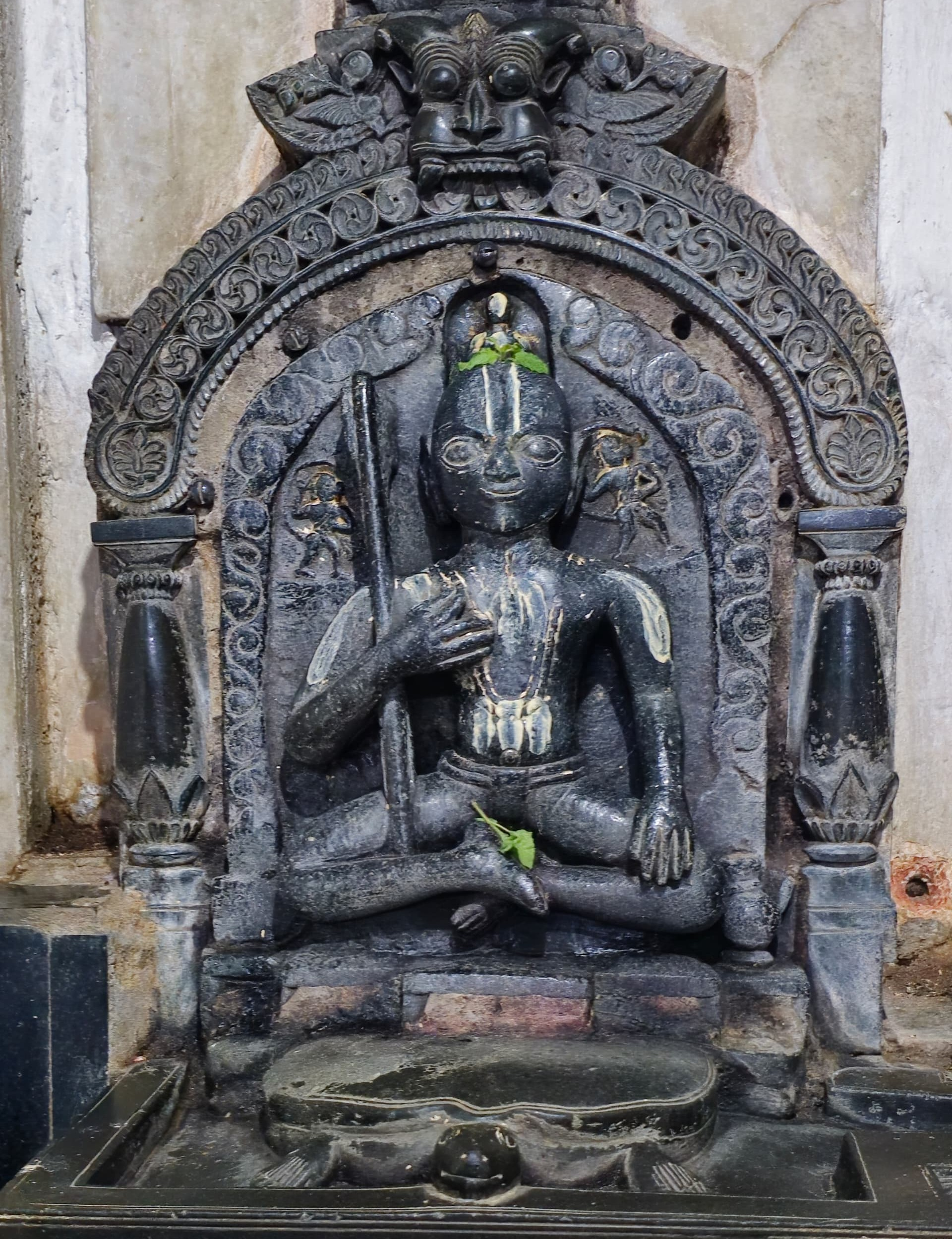
- Idol of Vidyadhisha Tirtha at Ranebennur, Karnataka, India

Personal life
- Born: Pandurangi Narasimhacharya Puntamba, Maharashtra
- Died: 1631 Ekachakranagaram

Religious life
- Religion: Hinduism
- Order: Vedanta (Uttaradi Math)
- Philosophy: Dvaita, Vaishnavism

Religious career
- Teacher: Vedavyasa Tirtha
- Successor: Vedanidhi Tirtha
- Disciples: Vedanidhi Tirtha, Pandurangi Keshavacharya, Kasi Timmannacharya

Vidyadhisha Tirtha (Vidyādhīśa Tīrtha), was an Indian philosopher, scholar, theologian, saint and dialectician. He served as the sixteenth pontiff of Uttaradi Math from 1619 to 1631. He is considered to be one of the important stalwarts in the history of Dvaita school of thought on account of his sound elucidations of the works of Madhvacharya, Jayatirtha and Vyasatirtha. He is also the most celebrated pontiff of Uttaradi Math after Padmanabha Tirtha, Jayatirtha and Raghuttama Tirtha.

Born into a Deshastha Brahmin family of scholars, Vidyadhisha started pursuing the knowledge of Mīmāṃsā, Vyakhyana and Vedanta at very early age. Before becoming the pontiff of Uttaradi Math, he was an accomplished scholar and logician. He composed 10 works, consisting of commentaries on the works of Madhva, Jayatirtha and Vyasatirtha and several independent treatises. His work Vakyartha Chandrika is an elaborate, complicated commentary known for its brilliance.

== Biography ==
Most of the information about Vidyadhisha Tirtha's life is derived from Vidyadhisha Vijaya. He was born as Narasimhacharya in a Pandurangi family of scholars to Anandacharya or Ananda Bhattaraka, who was an erudite scholar in Nyaya, Vedanta, Mimamsa, Vyakarana and a disciple of Raghuttama Tirtha of Uttaradi Math. The family belongs to Vashista gotra and Deshastha Brahmin community. Narasimha received all his instructions in Vyakarana, Nyaya and other branches under his own father, Ananda Bhattarka. He was married early and settled in Puntamba, to teaching. He have defeated many learned scholars of his village like Tama Bhatta, Golinga Shivabhatta, Vishva Pandita and others in Tarka and Vyakarana. After his father's death, he moved off to Nashik and Tryambak on account of fear of Muslim depredations on his town. Narasimha lived for eight years at Sangamner and Paithan and thence moved down to Pandharpur and then to Bijapur where he defeated Narasa Pandita. His learning and achievements attracted Vedavyasa Tirtha of Uttaradi Math, who honoured him with presents and invited him to Mannur on the Bhima River, where he was persuaded to take orders and was ordained a monk under the name Vidyadhisha. The main incidents in Vidyadhisha's pontifical career were his disputations with Rangoji Bhatta and his tour of south and north of India. Rangoji Bhaṭṭa was the brother of Bhaṭṭoji Dīkṣita. He visited Dhanushkoti, Madurai, Srirangam, Tiruchirappalli, Thanjavur, Kumbhakonam, Kanchi, Dharmapuri and Udupi in south. His northern tour included Benares and Gaya where he converted whole community of Gayawalas to the religion of Madhva. This great historic event has given the school of Madhvacharya followers from among important section of Hindi-speaking Brahmins of the North India. The Gayawalas ever since remained staunch followers of Madhva, oving allegiance to Uttaradi Math. The Gurucharya place this event in 1630. Later he visited Badri and on his way back from there, he disappeared, in 1631, at Ekachakranagaram, in the Ganga-Yamuna daob. The descendants of Vidyadhisha family have subsequently installed his image in Tuminakatte near Ranebennur where they celebrate his anniversary, every year, as the original Brindavana of Ekachakranagara could not be located.

== Works ==
The number of extant works ascribed to Vidyadhisha Tirtha are eleven in number. There are five commentaries and six independent works ascribed to him.

=== Commentaries ===
Name	Description	References
Vakyartha Chandrika	Commentary on Nyaya Sudha of Jayatirtha	
Pramanalakshanaṭippani	Gloss on Pramanalakshana of Madhva	
Viṣṇutattvanirṇayaṭippani	Commentary on Viṣṇutattvanirṇaya of Madhva	
Kathālakṣaṇaṭippani	Gloss on Kathālakṣaṇa of Madhva	
Talavakopanishadkhandartham	Commentary on Talavakaropanishad	

=== Independent works ===
Name	Description	References
Ēkādaśīnirṇaya	Work on how to determine Ekadashi	
Janmāṣṭamīnirṇaya	Work on how to determine Janmashtami	
Vishnupanchakavratanirnaya	Work on how to determine days for Vishnu Panchaka Vrata	
Tithitrayanirnaya	Work on how to determine Tithi	
Oṃkāravādartha	An exposition on the word OM	
Rangojibhattadhikkāra	A work containing few points raised by Rangoji Bhatta during the debate & replies to them.	

== Bibliography ==
- Sharma, B. N. Krishnamurti (2000). A History of the Dvaita School of Vedānta and Its Literature, Vol 1. 3rd Edition. Motilal Banarsidass (2008 Reprint). ISBN 978-8120815759.
- Bhatta, C. Panduranga; Samuel, G. John (1997), Contribution of Karṇāṭaka to Sanskrit, Institute of Asian Studies
- Prabhupada, His Divine Grace A. C. Bhaktivedanta Swami (2012), Sri Caitanya-caritamrta, Madhya-lila: The Pastimes of Lord Caitanya Mahaprabhu, The Bhaktivedanta Book Trust, ISBN 978-9171496621
- Potter, Karl H. (1995). Encyclopedia of Indian philosophies. 1, Bibliography : Section 1, Volumes 1-2. Motilal Banarsidass. ISBN 978-8120803084.
- Dikshit, G. S. (1981). Studies in Keladi History: Seminar Papers. Mythic Society.
- Krishna, Daya (2002). Developments in Indian Philosophy from Eighteenth Century Onwards: Classical and Western. Project of History of Indian Science, Philosophy, and Culture. ISBN 978-8187586081.

Bon, Bhakti Hridaya (1960). Indian Philosophy & Culture, Volumes 5-6. Vaishnava Research Institute, Vrindāban, India.
