= Satyavrata Tirtha =

Indian philosopher

Sri Satyavrata Tirtha

Personal life
- Born: Ranganathacharya Present day North Karnataka
- Resting place: Sangli

Religious life
- Religion: Hinduism
- Order: Vedanta (Uttaradi Math)
- Philosophy: Dvaita Vedanta

Religious career
- Teacher: Vedanidhi Tirtha
- Successor: Satyanidhi Tirtha

Satyavrata Tirtha (died. 1638 CE) was a Hindu philosopher, yogi, mystic, scholar and saint. He served as the pontiff of Shri Uttaradi Math from 1635 to 1638. He was the 18th in succession from Madhvacharya. Satyavrata Tirtha ruled the pontificate with a remarkable distinction. His life was a saga of supreme spiritual achievements. He is a yogi of remarkable spiritual powers and a philosopher of wide fame.

== Works ==
Satyavrata Tirtha authored some works consisting of gloss, commentaries on the works of Jayatirtha, Vyasatirtha and a few hymns. Satyavrata Tirtha wrote a commentary on Nyaya Sudha of Jayatirtha called Sudha Vivruthi. His gloss on Nyayamrutha of Vyasatirtha is also most appreciated.

== Bibliography ==
- Sharma, B. N. Krishnamurti (2000). A History of the Dvaita School of Vedānta and Its Literature, Vol 1. 3rd Edition. Motilal Banarsidass (2008 Reprint). ISBN 978-8120815759.
- Potter, Karl H. (1995). Encyclopedia of Indian philosophies. 1, Bibliography : Section 1, Volumes 1-2. Motilal Banarsidass Publications. ISBN 978-8120803084.
- Dasgupta, Surendranath (1975). A History of Indian Philosophy, Volume 4. Motilal Banarsidass. ISBN 978-8120804159.
- Devadevan, Manu V. (2016). A Prehistory of Hinduism. Walter de Gruyter GmbH & Co KG. ISBN 978-3110517378.
