= Vedanidhi Tirtha =

Dvaita philosopher

Sri Vedanidhi Tirtha

Personal life
- Born: Koratagi Pradyumnacharya Karatagi (Present day in Koppal district, Karnataka)
- Died: 1635 Pandharpur
- Resting place: Pandharpur, Maharashtra

Religious life
- Religion: Hinduism
- Order: Vedanta (Uttaradi Math)
- Philosophy: Dvaita, Vaishnavism

Religious career
- Teacher: Vidyadhisha Tirtha
- Successor: Satyavrata Tirtha

Shri Vedanidhi Tirtha (Śrī Vedanidhi Tīrtha) (died 1635), was a Hindu philosopher, scholar, theologian and saint. He served as the pontiff of Shri Uttaradi Math from 1631-1635. He was the seventeenth in succession from Madhvacharya.

== Life ==
Most of the information about Vidyanidhi Tirtha's life is derived from various sources. Vedanidhi Tirtha was a close contemporary of Raghavendra Tirtha. According to Guruvavansha Mahakavya, Sri Raghavendra Swami when once he came to Vedanidhi Tirtha openly declared that Sita sameta Moola Rama was only in the Uttaradi Matha. During his last days he ordained Satyavrata Tirtha and declared him as the successor to the Peetha of Uttaradi Matha and also Instructed him that he in turn should ordain Kaulagi Raghupathacharya In course of time.

== Bibliography ==
- Rao, C. R. (1984). Srimat Uttaradi Mutt: Moola Maha Samsthana of Srimadjagadguru Madhvacharya.
- Sharma, B. N. Krishnamurti (2000). A History of the Dvaita School of Vedānta and Its Literature, Vol 1. 3rd Edition. Motilal Banarsidass (2008 Reprint). ISBN 978-8120815759.
- Samuel, G. John (1997). Contribution of Karaṇāṭaka to Sanskrit. Institute of Asian Studies.
- Das, Sambidānanda (1972). Sri Chaitanya Mahaprabhu. Sree Gaudiya Math.
