= Nataka =

Village in Uttar Pradesh, India

Nataka is a village in Mirzapur, Uttar Pradesh, India.
