= Vedavyasa Tirtha =

Hindu philosopher, scholar and saint

Sri Vedavyasa Tirtha

Personal life
- Born: Anantha Vyasacharya
- Died: 1619 Penukonda

Religious life
- Religion: Hinduism
- Order: Vedanta (Uttaradi Math)
- Philosophy: Dvaita Vedanta

Religious career
- Teacher: Raghuttama Tirtha
- Successor: Vidyadhisha Tirtha
- Disciples: Vidyadhisha Tirtha, Narayanacharya, Vidyapati Theertha, Krishnadwaipayana

Vedavyasa Tirtha was a Hindu philosopher, scholar and saint. He served as the pontiff of Shri Uttaradi Math from 1595-1619. He was the 15th in succession from Madhvacharya. Vedavyasa Tirtha ruled the pontificate with a remarkable distinction.and entered into vrindavana at banks of river markandeya

== Bibliography ==
- Sharma, B. N. Krishnamurti (2000). A History of the Dvaita School of Vedānta and Its Literature, Vol 1. 3rd Edition. Motilal Banarsidass (2008 Reprint). ISBN 978-8120815759.
- Rao, C. R. (1984). Srimat Uttaradi Mutt: Moola Maha Samsthana of Srimadjagadguru Madhvacharya.
- Dasgupta, Surendranath (1975). A History of Indian Philosophy, Volume 4. Motilal Banarsidass. ISBN 978-8120804159.
