= Chandrika Bindu =

Sanskrit work by Satyapriya Tirtha

- Author: Satyapriya Tirtha
- Language: Sanskrit
- Subject: Hindu philosophy
- Genre: Dvaita Vedanta
- Publisher: Original: 18th century
- Publication place: India

Chandrika Bindu (Sanskrit: चन्द्रिका बिंदु) is a Sanskrit work on Dvaita philosophy written by Satyapriya Tirtha. It is a lucid adaptation of the well-known commentary on Vyasatirthas Tatparya Chandrika or Chandrika, which is a commentary on Tattva Prakasika by Jayatirtha, which in turn is a commentary on Madhva's Brahma Sutra Bhashya.
