= Satya Vijaya Nagaram =

- Census town
- Location in Tamil Nadu, India Satya Vijaya Nagaram (India)
- Coordinates: 12°41′30″N 79°20′02″E
- Country: India
- State: Tamil Nadu
- District: Tiruvanamalai

Population (2001)
  - Total: 5,671

Languages
  - Official: Tamil
- Time zone: UTC+5:30 (IST)

Satya Vijaya Nagaram (also known as S. V. Nagaram), is a census town in Tiruvanamalai district in the Indian state of Tamil Nadu. The town is named after Satya Vijaya Tirtha, peetadhipathi of Uttaradi Matha whose Moola Brindavana (tomb) is in this town. The town was established by rulers of Arni who were devout followers of Uttaradi Matha and Madhva Sampradaya.

== Demographics ==
As of 2001 India census, Satyavijayanagaram had a population of 5671. Males constitute 50% of the population and females 50%. Satyavijayanagaram has an average literacy rate of 68%, higher than the national average of 59.5%: male literacy is 78%, and female literacy is 57%. In Satyavijayanagaram, 12% of the population is under 6 years of age.
