= Abhinavamruta =

Sanskrit work on Dvaita philosophy by Satyanatha Tirtha

Abhinava Gada
- Author: Satyanatha Tirtha
- Language: Sanskrit
- Subject: Hindu philosophy
- Genre: Dvaita Vedanta
- Publisher: Original: 17th century; Modern: Satyadhyana Tirtha
- Publication place: India

Abhinavamritha (Sanskrit: अभिनवामृता; Abhinavamṛta) (also spelled Abhinavamrutha) is a Sanskrit work on Dvaita philosophy written by Satyanatha Tirtha. It is a lucid adaptation of the well-known commentary on Pramāṇa-Paddhatī of Jayatirtha, which is an independent work on the epistemological aspects (Pramana) of Dvaita. It runs to 1,400 granthas. It follows the commentary of Srinivasa Tirtha in the main, which it nevertheless criticizes on occasions.

== Bibliography ==
- Sharma, B. N. Krishnamurti (2000). A History of the Dvaita School of Vedānta and Its Literature, Vol 1. 3rd Edition. Motilal Banarsidass (2008 Reprint). ISBN 978-8120815759.
