= Abhinava Tandava =

- Author: Satyanatha Tirtha
- Language: Sanskrit
- Subject: Hindu philosophy
- Genre: Dvaita Vedanta
- Publisher: Original: 17th century
- Publication place: India

The Abhinava Tandava (also spelled as Abhinava Tandavam), also called Abhinava Tarkatandava (Sanskrit: अभिनवताण्डवम्), is a Sanskrit work on Dvaita philosophy written by Satyanatha Tirtha.

== Contents ==
Abhinava Tarkatandava is divided into three Paricchedas (chapters), Mangalavada, the self-validity of knowledge. Sannikarsha-Samavaya, the relation between subjects and its attributes, the invisibility of Vayu, the Parthivatva of gold, and Udayana's view of it, the validity of Smriti (recollection), the definition of Inference, Vyapti and the criticism of the second Vyapti-lakshana formulated by the Mani, the definition of Upadhi, Pakshatha, Avayava-lakshana, Hetvabasha, the subsumption of the other Pramanas like Upamāṇa within the three, the validity of Shabda, its fitness to recognised as independent Pramana, the definitions of Akanksha, Yogyata and Asatti, and the examination of Gangesha's views on these, the Apauruṣeyātva of Vedas, the eternity of sound, criticism of the Mīmāṃsāka view that Veda is nityanumeya, the import of injunctions the refutation of the Prabhākara's view of Karyata-jnana, as the pivot of activity, Apurva, the physical existence of the gods, Śaktivāda, Samasa-Śakti, the import of the Negative, etc., are some of the topics raised and discussed in the course of the work. Beside Gangesha, the author also refers also to the views of Raghunatha Siromani, and Ruchidatta. In this sense, Satyanatha's work makes a distinctive contribution to the advancement of the studies in Navya-Nyāya and its assessment by Dvaita thinkers.

== Overview ==
Abhinava Tarkatandava is a voluminous original work of Satyanatha, which is a dialectical classic, expounding the nature and the constitution of the logic and epistemological categories of the Dvaita system and refuting those of rival systems especially those of Nyaya-Vaisheshikas, on the same lines as Tarka Tandava of Vyasatirtha. The work runs to 11,367 granthas. The views of the Raghunatha Siromani and Ruchidatta Mishra, commentators on Gangesha Upadhyaya, those of Prabhākara's, Ramanuja and Vaisheshikas, are here quoted and refuted in detail.

== Bibliography ==
- Sharma, B. N. Krishnamurti (2000). A History of the Dvaita School of Vedānta and Its Literature, Vol 1. 3rd Edition. Motilal Banarsidass (2008 Reprint). ISBN 978-8120815759.
- Glasenapp, Helmuth von (1992). Madhva's Philosophy of the Viṣṇu Faith. Dvaita Vedanta Studies and Research Foundation.
- Bhatta, C. Panduranga; Samuel, G. John (1997), Contribution of Karṇāṭaka to Sanskrit, Institute of Asian Studies
