= Abhinava Chandrika =

- Author: Satyanatha Tirtha
- Language: Sanskrit
- Subject: Hindu philosophy
- Genre: Dvaita Vedanta
- Publisher: Original: 17th century; Modern: Published by Uttaradi Math (1945)
- Publication place: India

Abhinava Chandrika (Sanskrit: अभिनव चन्द्रिका; Abhinava-Candrikā) is a Sanskrit work on Dvaita philosophy written by Satyanatha Tirtha. It is a lucid adaptation of the well-known commentary on Jayatirthas Tattvaprakāśikā, which is a commentary on Madhvacharya's Brahma-sutra bhashya. It runs to 12,600 granthas and is magnum opus of Satyanatha Tirtha.

== Bibliography ==
- Sharma, B. N. Krishnamurti (2000). A History of the Dvaita School of Vedānta and Its Literature, Vol 1. 3rd Edition. Motilal Banarsidass (2008 Reprint). ISBN 978-8120815759.
- Sharma, B. N. Krishnamurti (1978). The Brahmasūtras and their principal commentaries: a critical exposition, Volume 3. Bharatiya Vidya Bhavan.
- Glasenapp, Helmuth von (1992). Madhva's Philosophy of the Viṣṇu Faith. Dvaita Vedanta Studies and Research Foundation.
- Bhatta, C. Panduranga; Samuel, G. John (1997), Contribution of Karṇāṭaka to Sanskrit, Institute of Asian Studies
- Dasgupta, Surendranath (1991), A History of Indian Philosophy, Volume 4, Motilal Banarsidass Publishers, ISBN 978-8120804159
