= Gayawal Brahmin =

Hindu Brahmin caste of Bihar, India

Gayawal Brahmins (also known as Brahma Kalpit Brahmins or Gayawal Pandas or Pandas of Gaya or Gayawal Tirth Purohits) are a Hindu caste, mainly concentrated in the Gaya district of Bihar, which is their native place. Gayawal Brahmins follow the Dvaita philosophy propounded by Madhvacharya and are followers of Uttaradi Matha.

The Gayawal Brahmins are the traditional priests at Vishnupad Temple. The Gayawal community serves as the principal temple priesthood at the major Hindu pilgrimage site of Gaya.

== Etymology ==
“Gayawal” literally means “a resident of Gaya,” but in practice the term refers specifically to a distinct Brahmin community known as the Gayawal Brahmins.
