= Mahabharata Tatparya Nirnaya =

Mahabharata Tatparya Nirnaya is a commentary on the Hindu epic Ramayana, birth of Veda Vyasa and Mahabharata by Sri Madhvacharya, the founder of the Dvaita school of philosophy.

== Contents ==
The Mahabharata Tatparya Nirnaya has 32 chapters. In Mahabharata Tatparya Nirnaya instead of viewing Mahabharata as a story work, Madhvacharya clearly gives it the status of Nirnayaka grantha. Sri Madhva also includes Ramayana in this work to show that Mahabharata is a complete work by the divine Sri Veda Vyasa. This work is an excellent exposition of the Mahabharata. It explains some finer aspects of the Mahabharata by supplementing it from other classical works such as Harivamsa, Vishnu Purana, Bhagavatha and others. Bheemasena is the clear hero of the Pandavas, in each and every incident this is underlined by giving much proof for each statement.

=== Reasons ===
In the second chapter "vAkyoddhAraH" Acharya mentions his reasons for writing this work (From Reference 2). 2.3. In some places (of the Mahabharatha) verses have been interpolated and in others verses have been omitted in some places, the verses have been transposed and in others, different readings have been given out of ignorance or otherwise. 2.4. Though the works are really indestructible, they must be deemed to be mostly altered. Mostly all of them have disappeared and not even one crore (out of several crores of slokas) now exists. 2.5 - 2.7. When the original work itself is so altered, What is there to say of its meaning which is intelligible (even) to the Devas only with difficulty. When the work had thus become altered in the Kali age, under the direction of Hari for its clear understanding, I shall state the settled truths having known them through His grace, and also having well known the other (extinct) works and all the Vedas through His grace, and also having examined the various editions existing in several places. 2.8 - 2.9. Just as the all-powerful supreme Lord Vyasa who is no other than Narayana has narrated in the Bharatha and other works, I shall also, with the knowledge imparted by Him, briefly state the essential teachings of all the Sastras, in accordance with the interpretation of Bharatha. The Bharatha is stated to be the decisive authority on all the Sastras. 2.10. Formerly when all the Devas headed by Brahma and others and the Rishis had assembled once under the very direction of Vyasa, Bharatha was weighed as against the Vedas and all other Sastras by placing them upon the two scales of a balance, when Bharatha excelled (in weight). 2.11. This work is called MahaBharatha on account of its greatest weight and highest quality. He who thus understands its mere definition is released from all sin. Note—Two objects of equal weight representing the presiding deity of each were weighed. 2.12 - 2.14. The truth of all the Sastras is indeed established in Bharatha by illustrations. The dependence of Brahma and others upon Vishnu is also brought out inasmuch as Bheema and others are clearly stated to be under the control of Krishna. It is also emphasized (therein) that Vishnu is the giver of knowledge and fame to all, inasmuch as He, in the form of Vyasa, promulgated their fame in Bharatha and imparted knowledge to Brahma, Rudra, and others who had incarnated as Suka and others.

Sri MadhvaAcharya has quoted from the various Puranas, Vedas, Mahabharata, BhagvadGita and various other shastras and has presented a clear and complete picture of all the shastras. Other schools of thought dismiss and omit scriptures that don't "pertain" to their preconceived notions. In this context, Sri Madhva has clearly shown how the conflicts are resolved and brought out the true meaning in each instance (like fire is hidden in Arani sticks).

Srimad Madhvacharya has quoted from all Puranas and still showing that Sri Hari is supreme. In fact in TantraSara he shows that each alphabet corresponds to Sri Hari. Sri Madhva has provided clear explanations to many apparently conflicting ideas presented in the Mahabharata.

== Commentaries ==
A commentary on Mahabharata Tatparyanirnaya is made by Raghavendra Tirtha. The essence of this work of 32 chapters has been captured in a work called Bhava Sangraha by Sri Raghavendra Swamy. while the first Nine chapters deal with Ramayana Tatprya Nirnaya, the 10th chapter describes the birth Shri Veda Vaysa. Rest deal with Mahabharath. In the Bhava Sangraha, there are therefore 32 slokas followed by a concluding sloka.

== See also ==
- Madhvacharya bibliography
