= Vijayindra Tirtha =

Indian philosopher

Personal life
- Born: Vitthalachārya (ವಿಠ್ಠಲಾಚಾರ್ಯ); 1517
- Died: 1614 (aged 96–97)
- Notable work(s): Laghu Amoda, Upasamhara Vijaya, Chakra Mimamsa
- Honors: Sarvatantrasvatantra

Religious life
- Religion: Hinduism
- Order: Vedanta
- Philosophy: Dvaita

Religious career
- Teacher: Surendra Tirtha, Vyasatirtha
- Successor: Sudhindra Tirtha

Vijayīndra Tīrtha (also known as Vijayendra Tīrtha) (c.1517 - c.1614) was a Dvaita philosopher and dialectician. A prolific writer and an unrelenting polemicist, he is said to have authored 104 treatises expounding the principles of Dvaita and defending it against attacks from the contemporary orthodox schools of Vedanta. He held the pontifical seat at Kumbakonam under the rule of Thanjavur Nayaks where he participated in polemical discussions with the Advaita philosopher Appayya Dikshita Inscriptions from that era record grants of villages received by Vijayindra for his triumph over theological debates . Legend ascribes to him mastery over 64 arts and his erudition, writes Sharma, "is evident from a few of his works bearing on Purva Mimamsa, Nyaya and Kavya literature".

== Life ==
Almost nothing is known about his early life and family. Most of the information on Vijayindra is derived from a few inscriptions and two hagiographies: Rāghavendra Vijaya and Guruguṇastavana. Born as Vitthalācharya in a Kannada-speaking Deshastha Madhva Brahmin family, he studied Vedanta, Mimamsa and Nyaya under the philosopher Vyasatirtha. He also received training in Kavya (poetics), Natya (drama) and Alankara (rhetoric). Aged 25, he moved to Kumbakonam at the behest of Surendra Tirtha, the erstwhile pontiff of the Dhakshinadi Kavindra mutt. (Note: According to the songs of Purandara, Surendra, impressed by the brilliance of the young Vitthala, asked Vyasatirtha to gift him Vitthala) Vitthala eventually succeeded Surendra as the pontiff with the title Vijayīndra Tīrtha. Inscriptional evidence and traditional accounts note that Vijayindra received patronage from Aliya Rama Raya and grants from Sevappa Nayak of Tanjore. He was involved in severe polemical discussions with his rival and friend Appayya Dikshita, with several of his works dedicated to refuting the claims of Appayya. After his death in 1614, his mortal remains were enshrined in the mutt at Kumbakonam. He was succeeded by Sudhindra Tirtha.

== Works ==
Vijayindra Tirtha is credited with as many as 104 literary works of which many are non-extant. A few that remain mainly consist of commentaries on the works of Vyasatirtha (Laghu Amoda) and Madhva (Tattvaprakasika Tippani), polemical works refuting the works of Appayya Dikshita and several treatises dealing with the issue of compatibility of Dvaita with Mimamsa (Chakra Mimamsa). A few poems and three dramatical works have been attributed to him as well.

== List of notable works ==
104 works are attributed to Vijayindra of which only sixty are extant. Except for a few notable works, many remain unprinted. The manuscripts are preserved in mutts at Nanjangud, Mantralayam and Kumbakonam.

Name	Description	References
Tattvamanimanekyapetika	Commentary on Brahma Sutra Bhashya of Madhva	
Gudabhavaprakasika	Commentary on Tattvodyota of Madhva	
Tattvaprakasika Tippani	Summary of Tattva Prakasika of Madhva	
Laghu Amoda	Commentary on Nyayamruta of Vyasatirtha	
Nyayamauktikamala	Commentary on Tatparya Chandrika of Vyasatirtha	
Yuktiratnakara	Commentary on Tarka Tandava of Vyasatirtha	
Pramana Paddhati Vyakhyana	Gloss on Pramana Paddhati of Jayatirtha	
Adhikaranamala	Treatise on the Mimamsa elements in Nyayamruta	
Chandrikodahrta Nyaya Vivaranam	Treatise on the Mimamsa elements in Tatparya Chandrika	
Appayya Kapola Chapetika	Refutation of the works of Appayya Dikshita	
Madhva Kantako Dhara	Rebuttal to Madhvatantramukhabhanga of Appayya Dikshita	
Chakra Mimamsa	Defence of mudradharana from the viewpoint of Mimamsa (Note: Mudradharana is the Vaishnavite practice of branding the symbols of Vishnu on the body)	
Bhedavidyavilasa	Polemical treatise emphasising the doctrine of five-fold difference	
Paratattva Prakasika	Criticism of Appayya Dikshita's Sivatattvaviveka	
Brahmasutra Nyayasangraha	Gist of Brahma Sutra distilling elements from Anu Vyakhyana of Madhva	
Siddhanta Sarasara Viveka	Polemical tract against the tenets of Visistadvaita and Shiva Advaita	
Ananda Taratamya Vadartha	Polemical tract against the tenets of Visistadvaita	
Nyayadhvadipika	Manual on the Mimamsa elements in Dvaita	
Upasamhara Vijaya	Rejoinder to Upakrama Parakrama of Appayya Dikshita	
Pistapashu Mimamsa	Treatise arguing for the usage of flour-made animals for rituals	
Mimamsa Naya Kaumudi	The compatibility between the works of Madhva and Mimamsa is explored	
Advaita Siksha	Polemical rebuttal to Advaitadipika of Narasimhasrama	
Shaiva Sarvasva Khandanam	Treatise arguing for the supremacy of Vishnu	
Subhadra Dhananjaya	Drama on the marriage of Arjuna and Subhadra	
Narayana Sabdartha Nirvachana	Monograph on the etymology of the word Narayana	
Turiyasiva Khandana	Polemical tract arguing against the fourth stage of consciousness of Advaita	
Tatparya Chandrika Kuchodya Kuthara	Refutation in favour of Tatparya Chandrika by Vyasatirtha	

== Bibliography ==
- Sharma, B. N. Krishnamurti (2000). A History of the Dvaita School of Vedānta and Its Literature, Vol. 2, 3rd Edition. Motilal Banarsidass. ISBN 978-8120815759.
- Hebbar, B.N (2005). The Sri-Krsna Temple at Udupi: The History and Spiritual Center of the Madhvite Sect of Hinduism. Bharatiya Granth Nikethan. ISBN 81-89211-04-8.
- Vriddhagirisan, V (1995). Nayaks of Tanjore. Asian Educational Services. ISBN 978-8120609969.
- Sarma, R. Nagaraja (1937). Reign of realism in Indian philosophy. National Press.
- Pandurangi, K.T (2004). Nyayadhvadipika. Dvaita Vedanta Studies and Research Foundation.
- Hebbar, B.N (2004). The Sri Krsna Temple at Udupi. Nataraj Books. ISBN 978-1881338505.
- Fischer, Elaine (2017). Hindu Pluralism: Religion and the Public Sphere in Early Modern South India. University of California Press. ISBN 9780520293014.
- Heras, Henry (1927). South India Under the Vijayanagara Empire: The Aravidu Dynasty, Volume 2. Cosmo.
- Mahalingam, T.V (1937). Administration and Social Life Under Vijayanagar: Administration. University of Madras.
