= Appayya Dikshita =

Indian philosopher

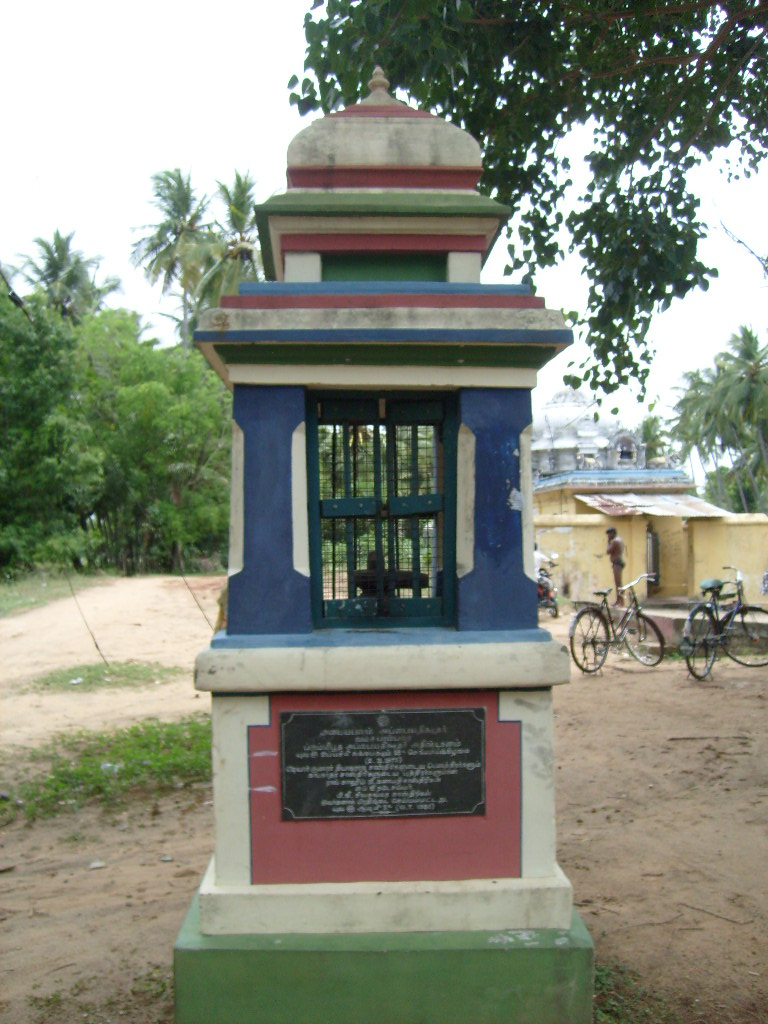
Appayya Dikshita samadhi

Appayya Dīkṣita (IAST: Appayya Dīkṣita; 1520–1593 CE) was a prominent South Indian philosopher and scholar associated with the school of Advaita Vedanta and a theologian of Shaivism. While he is widely remembered as an influential preceptor of the Advaita tradition, he was historically rooted in the Śivādvaita (Shaiva Advaita) school as its most prominent representative. A 1580 copper plate inscription attributed to Śivappa Nāyaka of Tañjāvūr describes him as the "sole emperor of Śaiva Advaita" (śaivādvaitaikasāmrājya). He was a polymath whose works spanned dozens of treatises on Śaiva and Advaita metaphysics, Mīmāṃsā scriptural hermeneutics, and alaṅkāra poetic theory, while also composing numerous volumes of devotional poetry and a ritual manual for the daily worship of Shiva.

He is best known for his major treatise, the Śivārkamaṇi-dīpikā, a sub-commentary on the brahmamīmāṃsā-bhāṣya, itself a Śaiva Brahma Sūtra commentary authored by Śrīkaṇṭha Śivācārya (c. 14th century CE). Lawrence McCrea notes that Appayya retrieved the obscure commentary of Śrīkaṇṭha, which integrated Śaivism with Vedānta through a śiva-viśiṣṭādvaita Vedānta framework, and introduced it to a broad scholarly audience while simultaneously reinterpreting it through his own theology of Śivādvaita. An inscription ascribed to Appayya himself on a wall of the Kālakaṇṭheśvara temple notes that, upon the publication and public teaching of this treatise, his royal patron Cinnabomma of Vellore bathed him in gold and established an endowment for 500 students to commit themselves to its study. In spite of his lifelong Śaiva leanings, he cultivated a scholarly persona independent of any particular school, drawing explicit inspiration from the Śrī Vaiṣṇava theologian Veṅkaṭanātha Vedānta Deśika (1268-1269 CE), whom Appayya admired as a sarvatantra-svatantra, i.e. a scholar capable of manipulating the tenets of any philosophical system to prove or disprove them at will.

== Biography ==
=== Early life and lineage ===
Appayya Dīkṣita was born in 1520 to a family of Śaiva scholars and poets, a pedigree attested in various autobiographical prefaces and contemporary inscriptions. Bronner notes that while he never formally subscribed to any sectarian institution or royal court, he displayed an explicit loyalty and reverence to his own lineage and ancestry. In family colophons, his father Śrīraṅgarāja Adhvarin (also known as Śrīraṅgarāja Makhin) is recorded as a performer of the viśvajit and mahāvrata rites. In one of Appayya's colophons, his father is praised as "the kaustubha gem that emerged from the ocean that is the lineage of the sage Bharadvāja."

In the preface to the Śivārkamaṇi-dīpikā, Appayya attributes to his father a total mastery of all philosophical systems (akhila-darśana-paribhājaḥ). Similarly, he describes his grandfather Ācārya Dīkṣita (also known as Accān Dīkṣita) as an eminent scholar of Advaita and a universal teacher (aśeṣa-guru) whose being was "immersed in the vast ocean of the rapture of non-duality." Furthermore, in his praise-poem to Vishnu titled the Varadarājastava, Appayya notes that his paternal grandmother hailed from a celebrated Śrīvaiṣṇava family, allowing him to claim both Śaiva and Vaiṣṇava scholarly pedigree.

While there is some scholarly debate regarding whether the contemporary Advaita scholar Nṛsiṃha was responsible for his early schooling, the only preceptors Appayya explicitly names are his father and grandfather. He later himself became an influential teacher both at the Kālakaṇṭheśvara temple and in the provincial town of Vellore, at one point being said to have instructed 500 scholars on the Śivārkamaṇi-dīpikā commentary. Traditional accounts and his devotional compositions emphasize his piety and devotion to Shiva.

=== Imperial politics and patronage ===
Much of Dīkṣita's intellectual career unfolded alongside the court politics of the Vijayanagara Empire. The 16th century saw a gradual ascendancy of Vaiṣṇavism over Śaivism, culminating in the removal of the image of Virūpākṣa (the form of Shiva originally established by the founding Vijayanagara rulers in the 14th century), and its replacement with the Vaiṣṇava deity Viṭṭhala, a form of Vishnu. Intellectually, this Vaiṣṇava hegemony was primarily led by the Viśiṣṭādvaita Vedānta school of the Śrīvaiṣṇava sampradāya, alongside the rising Dvaita Vedānta school of the Mādhva sampradāya. The former was represented by Tātācārya, who wielded political influence within the Vijayanagara court, while the latter was represented by Vijayindra Bhikṣu, a prolific philosopher of the Mādhva tradition. Textual records depict Appayya, Tātācārya, and Vijayēndra as the three leading intellectual rivals of their cultural milieu. Owing to the dominance of Vaiṣṇavism in the imperial capital, Appayya's activities were centered primarily around regional chieftains, most notably Cinnabomma Nāyaka of Vellore. He enjoyed the close royal patronage of Cinnabomma for nearly three decades (between 1549–1578), lasting until the chieftain's death. Although based regionally, Appayya's works achieved wide pan-Indian circulation, reflecting his influence across various scholarly networks in the subcontinent.

=== Literary output and philosophical phases ===
Dīkṣita is credited with authoring roughly 100 original Sanskrit treatises spanning a vast range of genres, subject matter, and authorial intentions. His early career was characterized by polemical tracts designed to assert the supremacy of Shiva over Vishnu. This phase is represented by devotional praises (stotra, stuti) like the Śiva-tattva-viveka and Brahma-tarka-stava, as well as his brief commentarial readings of the Rāmāyaṇa (Rāmāyaṇa-tātparya-sāra-saṅgraha-stotra) and the Mahābhārata (Bhārata-sāra-saṅgraha-stotra). These works argue for Śaiva supremacy primarily through a strategic exegesis of the Purāṇas, Upaniṣads, and epics. Other notable devotional hymns from this period include the Ātmārpaṇa-stuti, Śivamahima-kalikā-stuti, and Pañcatattva-stuti.

Following this early polemical phase, he was commissioned by Cinnabomma to compose the Śivārkamaṇi-dīpikā, his major commentary on Śrīkaṇṭha's work. This work is a subcommentary on the Brahmasūtra commentary of Śrīkaṇṭha, which seeks to establish a synthesis between Śaivism and Vedānta by identifying Shiva with the non-dual Brahman of the Upaniṣads and Brahma Sūtras. Concurrently, Appayya authored several objective, standard encyclopedic texts on Advaita Vedanta and other Vedānta schools, such as the Kalpataruparimala, Siddhānta-leśa-saṅgraha, and Caturmata-sāra-saṅgraha, alongside polemical commentaries explicitly targeting Mādhva Dvaita philosophy, including the Nyāya-rakṣāmaṇi and Mādhva-tarka-mukhamardana. His mature works, such as the Śivādvaita-nirṇaya, demonstrate a shift where he explicitly synthesized his Śaiva theology within an Advaita framework.

=== Later years and hagiographical accounts ===
Historical sources for Appayya's personal life are scarce and intertwined with oral history. Early biographical material comes from his immediate descendants, including his nephew Samarapuṅgava Dīkṣita and grand-nephew Nīlakaṇṭha Dīkṣita. A 19th-century descendant, Śivānanda Yogin, authored a hagiography titled the Śrīmad-appayyadīkṣitendra-vijaya, which depicts Appayya as an avatar of Shiva.

According to these traditional accounts, Appayya was influenced by the anti-Śaiva polemics in Vedānta Deśika's allegorical play Saṅkalpasūryodaya, motivating him to defend and promote both Advaita and Śaivism. Traditional narratives also include miraculous anecdotes; one account claims that during a deep meditative state (samādhi) in his private shrine room, Appayya's body was seen emitting light and encircled by snakes by his wife when she peered through the door. This sight supposedly led to the loss of her vision.

Later hagiographies also describe intense conflicts between Appayya and his political and intellectual rival, Tātācārya. These accounts attribute several miraculous acts to Appayya, claiming he cured royal illnesses caused by sorcery, survived assassination attempts by poisoning, repelled attackers through supernatural means, ultimately resulting in Tātācārya's sudden death or subsequent repentance and submission to Appayya. Following his period of rivalry with Tātācārya, Dīkṣita is said to have spent his latter years at the Nataraja temple in Chidambaram, where he died at the age of 73. In the ensuing centuries, his descendants held positions across various royal courts and scholastic networks throughout India, writing commentaries and original treatises across multiple disciplines to preserve and expand his philosophical work.

== Works and scholarship ==
According to the biography of Vijayindra Bikṣu, a leading Madhva scholar, he composed 104 works in competition with Appayya Dīkṣita. According to Ramesan this suggests that Appayya himself produced a comparable number of works. This oeuvre includes both major treatises and concise compositions, spanning philosophy, theology, and devotion.

=== Comparing major schools of Vedanta ===
In his work Caturmatasarsamgraha, Appayya Dikshita sought to organize and compare the doctrines of the four major schools interpreting the Brahmasūtra: (1) Nyayamanjari – expounding the Advaita perspective of Śankarācārya, (2) Nayamaṇimālā – expounding the Śivādvaita perspective of Śrīkaṇṭha Śivācārya, (3) Nayamayūkhamālikā – expounding the Viśiṣṭādvaita perspective of Rāmānuja and (4) Nyāyamuktāvalī – expounding the Dvaita perspective of Madhvācārya. His methodical analysis of these schools earned recognition even among Vaishnava and Madhva scholars, who later adopted his works within their own traditions.

=== Advaita works ===
Appayya Dikshita’s contributions to Advaita Vedanta include several of his writings regarded as standard works in the traditional curriculum of Vedantic study. Among these, the Siddhanta Lesa Sangraha, Nyaya Rakshamani, and his celebrated commentary on the Kalpataru are especially significant.

==== Kalpataruparimala ====
His primary work in this domain is Parimala, a commentary on Amalananda’s Kalpataru. The acceptance of Parimala by Bengal scholars highlights Appayya’s pan-Indian reputation.

Appayya composed Parimala at the request of Sri Nrisimhasrami, a respected contemporary Advaita scholar. This work earned him the title Advaita Sthapanacharya. Other Vedantic writings by him include Nyaya Rakshamani and Siddhantalesa Samgraha, the latter preserving rare Advaitic teachings imparted by his father and remaining an important source for students of Vedanta.

==== Siddhanta Lesa Sangraha ====
The Siddhanta Lesa Sangraha is a comprehensive and original treatise in which Sri Appayya Dikshita systematically collects and presents the diverse dialectical positions within the Advaita tradition. Traditionally studied as a preparatory text before engaging with the Brahmasutra commentaries, it remains one of the most widely respected works in Advaita scholarship.

In this text, Dikshita meticulously records the varying interpretations of earlier Advaitins on key philosophical debates, such as ekajiva-vada (i.e., the theory of the single soul), nanajiva-vada (i.e., the theory of multiple souls), bimba–pratibimba-vada (i.e., the reflection theory), avichchinna-vada (i.e., the theory of indivisibility) and sakshitva-vada (i.e., the doctrine of the self as witness).

Although these schools appear divergent, Dikshita emphasizes that they all ultimately converge on the same fundamental insight: the essential oneness of the self (ātman) and the illusory character of the phenomenal world. In his interpretation, the various sub-doctrines serve primarily as intellectual strategies to account for empirical experience, which Advaita regards as a provisional empirical reality (vyāvahārika-sattā) rather than ultimate reality (pāramārthika-sattā).

==== Ānandalaharī ====
Ānandalaharī is a philosophical and devotional treatise attributed to Appayya Diksita that seeks to reconcile apparent sectarian conflicts between Śaivism and Vaiṣṇavism within a non-dualistic (Advaita) framework. In this work, Dikshita argues that sacred scriptures (Srutis and Puranas) utlimately point to the unqualified, attributeless Nirguna Brahman. He contends that the personal forms of Śiva and Viṣṇu represent non-different manifestations of the supreme divinity, thereby establishing the essential thelogical non-difference between the two deities. By framing worship through this non-dual lens, the Ānandalaharī serves as a foundational text harmonizing devotional practice with Advaita metaphysics.

==== Nyaya Rakshamani ====
The Nyaya Rakshamani is an independent and detailed commentary on the first pada (section) of the Brahmasutras, which deals with the fundamental topics of the self (ātman) and the universe. This work is especially valued for its precision and depth, and it continues to be recognized as one of the most authoritative texts attributed to Appayya Dikshita in the Advaitic tradition.

In Nyaya Rakshamani, Dikshita presents original and rigorous arguments by carefully examining both the pūrvapakṣa (prima facie objections) and the siddhānta (established conclusions) within each adhikaraṇa (topic). His treatment of the debates demonstrates a masterful command of dialectics, as well as a capacity to synthesize opposing viewpoints while firmly grounding them in Advaita Vedanta. The work is often cited by later commentators as an exemplar of intellectual rigor in Vedantic exegesis.

=== Shaivite works ===
Appayya Dikshita was a scholar with his vast literary output often inferred from contemporary accounts. For instance, the biography of Sri Vijayendra Bhikshu, a prominent Madhvacharya, records that he composed 104 works in rivalry with Appayya Dikshita—suggesting that Appayya himself authored a comparable number.

His writings span a wide range, from major philosophical treatises such as Parimala and Śivārkamaṇidīpikā, which remain authoritative references in their respective traditions, to shorter devotional hymns like Pañcaratna Stuti and Mārga Bandhu Stuti. Some works are original compositions, while others are commentaries (vyākhyānas), including expositions on his own texts.

Among his most notable contributions are his Śaivite works, composed to uphold and propagate the Śivādvaita doctrine. These include Śikhariṇīmālā (with its commentary) and Śivatattvaviveka, both of which expound the philosophical and theological supremacy of Lord Śiva. Produced during the Vijayanagara period—a time marked by vigorous polemical exchanges between Vaiṣṇavas and Śaivas—these works served to defend and consolidate the Śaiva philosophical tradition while also enriching its devotional literature.

==== Rāmāyaṇa Tatparya Saṅgraha and Bhārata Tatparya Saṅgraha ====
Sri Appayya Dikshita composed the Rāmāyaṇa Tatparya Saṅgraha and Bhārata Tatparya Saṅgraha, together with their commentaries, as interpretive works on the two great epics, the Rāmāyaṇa and the Mahābhārata. These texts seek to expound the inner meanings of the epics from a Śaivite standpoint, presenting them as primarily propagating the greatness of Lord Śiva.

In these works, Dikshita challenges the prevailing Vaiṣṇava interpretations—particularly the view that the Rāmāyaṇa highlights the doctrine of prapatti (total surrender to God). For example, he interprets Vibhīṣaṇa’s surrender not as an act of spiritual renunciation but as motivated by a desire to reclaim his kingdom. Through such readings, Dikshita advances a Śaiva perspective, offering a counterpoint to the dominant Vaiṣṇava exegesis of the epics.

=== Vaiṣṇava works ===
Although best known for his contributions to Advaita Vedānta and Śaiva philosophy, Sri Appayya Dikshita also composed works that reflect his engagement with Vaiṣṇavite literature and devotional traditions. His writings in this sphere underscore his broad outlook, which did not recognize any essential doctrinal conflict between the worship of Lord Śiva and Lord Viṣṇu.

==== Yādavābhyudaya Vyākhyāna ====
The Yādavābhyudaya is a detailed commentary on the mahākāvya Yādavābhyudaya of Sri Vedānta Deśika, one of the most eminent Vaiṣṇavite ācāryas. This work illustrates Dikshita’s willingness to study, appreciate, and critically engage with texts outside his own immediate philosophical school.

==== Varadarājastava ====
The Varadarājastava is a devotional hymn of 106 verses dedicated to Lord Varadarāja, the presiding deity of Kanchipuram. Despite his firm Advaitic orientation, Dikshita’s personal devotion to Lord Varadarāja is evident in this work. His ancestors were also traditional devotees of this deity, and the composition, along with its auto-commentary, reflects this enduring familial and regional piety.

=== Critique of Dvaita ===
Among Sri Appayya Dikshita’s polemical writings, two of the most noted are Madhva Tantra Mukha Mardana and Madhva Mata Vidhvaṃsana. These works are devoted to rigorous critiques of the Dvaita Vedānta school established by Sri Madhvacharya. In these texts, Dikshita employs sharp dialectical reasoning, drawing upon Advaitic principles to refute the dualistic doctrines of Dvaita Vedānta. His method combines subtle logic (tarka) with scriptural exegesis, aimed at exposing what he regarded as inconsistencies within the Madhva system. Both works circulated widely in northern and southern India, gaining recognition as models of polemical scholarship. In traditional Advaitic seminaries, they were often prescribed as advanced texts for training scholars in dialectical disputation and philosophical refutation.

==== Rāmānuja Śṛṅga Bhanga and Tattva Mudrā Vidrāvaṇam ====
Two works traditionally attributed to Sri Appayya Dikshita—Rāmānuja Śṛṅga Bhanga and Tattva Mudrā Vidrāvaṇam—are said to have been composed in refutation of the philosophical doctrines of Sri Ramanuja and the Dvaita school of Madhvacharya.

The title Rāmānuja Śṛṅga Bhanga literally means "Breaking the Horns of Ramanuja," a metaphor frequently employed in classical Indian polemical literature to denote a forceful philosophical rebuttal. Tattva Mudrā Vidrāvaṇam, meanwhile, criticizes the practice of self-branding (taptamudrā dhāraṇa), a religious observance followed by adherents of both Ramanuja and Madhvacharya.

The authenticity of these two works, however, remains uncertain. Though listed in some older catalogues of Appayya Dikshita’s writings, there is insufficient evidence to firmly attribute them to him. Moreover, verse 6 of the Śrī Dīkṣita Nava Ratna Mālikā, a devotional hymn authored by Dikshita himself, appears to suggest that he did not compose any text explicitly directed against Ramanuja’s philosophy.

=== Mīmāṃsā works ===
Sri Appayya Dikshita also made significant contributions to the field of Pūrva Mīmāṃsā. Among his best-known works are Vidhirasāyana and Sukhopayojinī. These texts contain detailed discussions of the three principal doctrines (vidhis) central to the Mīmāṃsā Śāstra, examining their nature and application. Both works became widely studied within traditional circles and were printed and circulated in later times, attesting to their enduring influence.

In addition to his well-known texts Vidhirasāyana and Sukhopayojinī, Sri Appayya Dikshita composed several other treatises on Mīmāṃsā, further reflecting his deep mastery of the discipline:

- Mīmāṃsā Vāda Nakṣatra Mālā – Contained within the Pūrvottara Mīmāṃsā Vāda Nakṣatra Mālā (listed under Vedānta works), this text deals with Mīmāṃsā doctrines and has been printed at Śrīraṅgam.
- Upakrama Parākrama – An elaborate discussion on the upakrama-nyāya of Mīmāṃsā as applied to Vedānta. The text underscores the significance of upakrama (introductory statement) and illustrates how it bridges principles shared between Pūrvamīmāṃsā and Uttaramīmāṃsā. This work has also been printed.
- Chitrapaṭa – A concise manual on the rules of Mīmāṃsā. It appears that this work has not been printed.
- Mayūkhāvalī – A commentary on Śāstra Dīpikā by Parthasārathi Miśra, published at Śrīraṅgam.
- Śiva Mahimā Kalikā Stuti – Though primarily a devotional text (already noted among his Śaivite works), it also contains explanations of anuṣṭhānas (ritual observances) and svarūpas of yajñas (sacrifices), elucidating their underlying principles through simple similes. Because of this, it is also considered part of Appayya’s Mīmāṃsā contributions.

=== Vyākaraṇa works ===
One such text related to Appayya Dikshita's work in Vyākaraṇa (i.e., Sanskrit grammar) includes the Pāṇinīya Tantravāda Nakṣatra Mālā. This text consists of 27 questions (praśnas) with detailed explanations. It is noted in an old Lahore catalogue alongside other printed works. Although it may have been printed at some point, no extant copies are currently available.

=== Alaṅkāraśāstra (Sanskrit poetics) ===
Appayya Dīkṣita made major contributions to Alaṅkāraśāstra (Sanskrit poetics and rhetoric), authoring foundational textbooks and advanced theoretical treatises that transformed the study of poetic figures across India. One such example of his work in this field is the Kuvalayānanda, a widely studied text on Alaṅkāra Śāstra, with a focus on arthālaṅkāra (i.e., meaning-based figures of speech). In this work, Appayya Dikshita analyzed and re-edited the classical treatises on the subject while also introducing new alaṅkāras of his own. Kuvalayānanda is considered the first standard text for students of poetics and has long served as an authoritative introduction to the discipline.

== Sources ==
- Bronner, Yigal (2016). "A Renaissance Man in Memory: Appayya Dīkṣita Through the Ages". Journal of Indian Philosophy. 44 (1): 11–39. doi:10.1007/s10781-014-9236-x.
- Duquette, Jonathan (2016). "Reading Non-Dualism in Śivādvaita Vedānta: An Argument from the Śivādvaitanirṇaya in Light of the Śivārkamaṇidīpikā". Journal of Indian Philosophy. 44 (1): 67–79. doi:10.1007/s10781-014-9231-x. ISSN 1573-0395. S2CID 254568153.
- Duquette, Jonathon (2021). Defending God in Sixteenth-Century India: The Śaiva Oeuvre of Appayya Dīkṣita. Oxford University Press. ISBN 978-0197566602.
- McCrea, Lawrence (2016). "Appayyadīkṣita's Invention of Śrīkaṇṭha's Vedānta". Journal of Indian Philosophy. 44 (1): 81–94. doi:10.1007/s10781-014-9239-7.
- Ramesan, N. (1972). Sri Appayya Dikshita. Hyderabad: Srimad Appayya Dikshitendra Granthavali Prakasana Samithi.
- Sivananda, Swami (1941). Lives of Saints. Rishikesh: Divine Life Society.
