= Bannanje Govindacharya =

Indian philosopher and Sanskrit scholar (1936–2020)

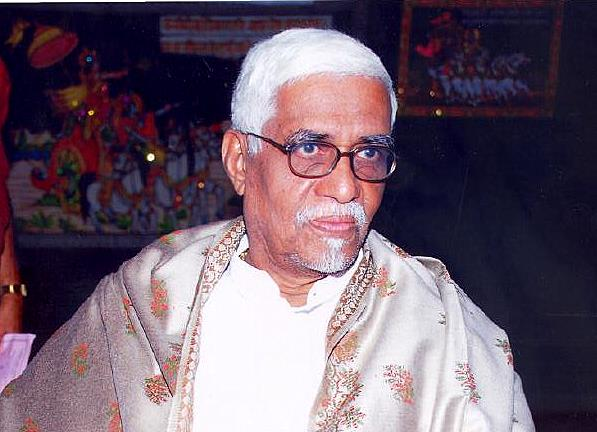
- Born: 3 August 1936; Udupi, Karnataka
- Died: 13 December 2020 (aged 84); Ambalpadi, Udupi, Karnataka
- Awards: Padma Shri (2009)

Philosophical work
- Region: India
- School: Dvaita Vedanta
- Website: https://bannanjegovindacharya-pratishtana.org/pravachana/

Bannanje Govindacharya (3 August 1936 – 13 December 2020) was an Indian philosopher and Sanskrit scholar versed in Veda Bhashya, Upanishad Bhashya, Mahabharata, Puranas and Ramayana. He wrote Bhashyas (commentaries) on Veda Suktas, Upanishads, Shata Rudriya, Brahma Sutra Bhashya, Gita Bhashya and was an orator. He was awarded the Padma Shri by the Government of India in 2009.

== Early life ==
Govindacharya was born on 3 August 1936, in the Bannanje neighborhood of Udupi to Tulu speaking Shivalli Madhva Brahmin parents, in present-day southern Indian state of Karnataka. He started his Vedic studies under his father, Tarkakesari S. Narayanacharya, and went on to study under Vidyamanya Tirtha Swamiji of the Palimaru Matha and Vidyasamudra Tirtha Swamiji of the Kaneyur Matha, both in Udupi. He later studied under Vishwesha Tirtha of the Pejawara Matha.

== Career ==
=== Vedic studies ===
Govindacharya was a Sanskrit scholar well-versed in Veda Bhashya, Upanishad Bhashya, Mahabharata, Puranas and Ramayana. He wrote Bhashyas, or commentaries, on Veda Suktas, Upanishads, ShataRudriya, BrahmaSutra Bhashya, and Gita Bhashya. He was also an orator. He wrote new Vyakarana Sutras, extending the work of Panini, and also did vyakhyana for the words written before Pāṇini. He sought to integrate ideas from philosophical texts to understand the texts composed by Vedavyasa. An exponent of Bhagavata chintana, he offered insights into the philosophical significance of Bhagavata and other Puranas.

While born into the Madhvacharya tradition, he had studied the previous works of both Shankara and Ramanuja and other philosophies before reading Madhvacharya's Tattvavaada. Proficient in both Sanskrit and Kannada, he authored approximately 4000 pages of Sanskrit Vyakhyana across roughly 150 books, including works in other languages. He wrote a screenplay for the Sanskrit film "Bhagavadgita" and "Shankaracharya," drawing from his experience in Madhvas Tattvavada or Madhva philosophy.

Best known for his pravachanas (discourses), Govindacharya's talks are widely appreciated among Tuluvas and Kannadigas worldwide, earning him widespread recognition. He also wrote on this Naaku-Tanti. His literary achievements also include his translation and commentaries of the complete texts of Shri Madhwacharya. He was awarded the Padma Shri by the Government of India in 2009.

=== Preservation of manuscripts ===
In 2005–2006, Professor P.R. Mukund (a disciple of Sri Bannanje) along with his colleague Dr. Roger Easton from the Rochester Institute of Technology in New York and Dr. Keith Knox of the Boeing Corporation in Hawaii, undertook the imaging and preserving of the original Sarvamoola Granthas authored by Madhvacharya. Knox and Easton had earlier imaged fragments of the Dead Sea Scrolls and are on the imaging team for the Archimedes Palimpsest project. Bannanje regarded this task as a project of enormous importance and was using the images in his studies of the manuscript.

=== Other contributions ===
Govindcharya also served as the editor at Udayavani early in his life. He wrote a book on the life of Shree Madhwa acharya called Acharya Madhva: Baduku-Bareha. It was published by RastraKavi Govinda Pai Samshodhana Kendra, Udupi.

Shri Acharya also propagated and preserved the Chaturdasha Bhajans, 14 songs in Sanskrit penned by Acharya Madhwa's direct disciples and prominent followers of his philosophy.

He also made contributions to the Indian and Kannada film industries. He wrote script in Sanskrit for G V Iyer's movies Bhagavadgeeta, Adi Shankaracharya, Shri Madhwacharya, and Sri Ramanujacharya. He also wrote the scripts for the Adi Shankaracharya and Madhwacharya movies. Adi Shankaracharya incidentally was the first movie made in Sanskrit.

== Works ==
Shri Bannanje Govindacharya made many contributions to Vedic scholarship. He authored numerous commentaries, translations and original works on the subject. He also contributed hundreds of articles in magazines and journals.

=== Publications edited ===
Works of Madhwa: This work is a reconstruction of the complete commentary on Madhwa's works by Shri Hrishikesha Tirtha, a direct disciple of Shri Madhwacharya of the 13th CE. It comprises 2000 pages in five volumes complete with footnotes and colophons. Two other works of Shri Madhwacharya, Tithinirnaya and Nyasa Paddhathi which were unknown were discovered and included in this great work.

=== Translation of major Sanskrit works into Kannada ===
Apart from the Vedic texts, Shri Bannanje also translated several other Sanskrit works into Kannada. These include,

- Bana Bhattana kadambari - A translation of Bāṇabhaṭṭa's novel
- Kalidasa's Shakuntala
- Shudraka's Mrichakatika as Aaveya Mannina Atada Bandi, won the Sahitya Akademi's award for translation in 2001
- Bhavabhuti's Uttaramacharita
- Mahashweta's Sanskrit stories
- Several Sanskrit poems.

=== Short commentaries in Sanskrit ===
- Anandamala of shri trivikramarya dasa
- Vayu Stuti of Shri Trivikrama Pandita
- Vishnu Stuti of Shri Trivikrama Pandita
- Chaturdashastotra – different stotras in Sanskrit
- Raghavendra stotra
- Jayathirtha stuti
- Vada ratnavali of Shri Vishudasacharya
- A philosophical dialectic in Sanskrit
- Short commentaries for six upanishads with commentaries of Trivikramarya Dasa

=== Detailed commentaries in Sanskrit ===
Some of Bannanje's detailed commentaries in Sanskrit include,

- Nirnaya Bhava Chandrika Tippani on Mahabharata Tatparya Nirnaya by Shri Madhvacharya
- Teeka (critique) on Mahabharata Tatparya (yamaka bharatha) by Shri Madhvacharya
- Teeka on Shri Madhwavijaya of Narayana Pandita
- Tippani on Bhagavata Tatparya Nirnaya by Shri Madhvacharya

=== Translation of Sanskrit to Kannada ===
- Purusha sukta
- Śrī Sūkta
- Shiva stuti
- Narashimha stuti
- Talavakaropanishad (Kenopanishad)
- Krishnamritamaharnava of Madhvacharya
- Tantra sara sangraha of Madhvacharya
- Sangraha Ramayana of Shri Narayana Panditacharya
- Madhwa Ramayana
- Parashara kanda para tattva (Kannada rendering of Shri Vishnu Purana)
- Prameya nava malika of Shri Narayana Panditacharya
- Anu Madhwa Charita & Sampradaya paddhati
- Mangalashtaka of Shri Rajarajeshwara yati
- Yajneeya mantropanishat (Ishavasya)
- Bhagavad Gita
- Ananda Thirthara Bhakti Geetegalu (Kannada rendering of Shri Madhwacharya's Sanskrit devotional songs.

== Death ==
Govindacharya died on 13 December 2020, at his home in Ambalpadi in Udupi. He was aged 85. His death was caused by a heart attack.

== Biographical film ==
An upcoming Kannada-language biographical film titled Indu Enage Govinda, based on Govindacharya's life, is currently in production. The film is directed by Karthik Saragur and produced by the Bengaluru-based Bannanje Govindacharya Foundation.

== Recognition and honours ==
Bannanje won numerous awards and various titles were conferred on him by esteemed institutions. Some of these include

- Padma Shri, India's fourth highest civilian honour, 2009
- The state award conferred by the Government of Karnataka for his meritorious service and scholarship in Vedic literature and philosophy.
- The Sahitya Akademi's award for translation in 2001
- Vidya Vachaspati - by Shri Admar Mutt swamiji, Udupi
- Pratibhambudhi - conferred on him by Puttige Mutt and Palimar Mutt swamijis
- Shastra savyasachi - a title conferred by Akhila Bharata Madhwa Maha Mandala, Bengalooru
- Shri Krishanugraha Prashasthi - an award presented by Pejavara Mutt swamiji
- Sahitya sarvabhouma - saraswata maha vishwa vidyalaya, Bengalooru
- Samshodhana Vichakshana : by Shri Admar & Shri Palimar Mutt
- Pandita Ratna : by Palimar Mutt swamiji
- Pandita shiromani - by Pratibha Ranga, Shivamogga
- Pandita Ratna : by H.H. Shrimad Dwarakanath swamiji of Gokarna Mutt, Partagali-Goa
- Vidya Ratnakara - title conferred by Shri Palimar Mutt swamiji
- The Academy of General Education, Manipal presented him with a fellowship for the meritorious service and scholarship in Indian religion and philosophy.
- Veda Vyasya Sanman : by Sree Ramaseva Mandali, Chamarajapet, Bangalore

== Conferences attended ==
- Brand Ambassador of India in World Conference on Religion & Peace, Princeton, USA in 1979.
- Participated in World Sanskrit Conference in Delhi in the 1980s.
- Was president to Sanskrit Parishat of South Canara.
- Served as President of All India Madhwa Sammelanna in Chennai in 1995.
- Served as President of the Sahitya Sammelanna in Udupi in 2001.
- Participated in number of poetic symposiums and debates.

== See also ==
- Dvaita
- Ashta Mathas of Udupi
