= Digvijaya (conquest) =

Sanskrit term in medieval India

Digvijaya, (Sanskrit: दिग्विजय; Dig:"Direction" and Vijaya:"Victory"), in ancient India was originally a Sanskrit term that meant conquest of the "four quarters", in a military or a moral context. In medieval times, it came to refer to the religious conquest by reputed founders of the major Hindu renunciate traditions, namely Madhva, Sankara, Chaitanya, and Vallabha.

== Military and moral conquest ==
Digvijaya as a military conquest is often mentioned in Indian history and mythology, for example, the digvijaya of Bharata Chakravartin. It was followed by rituals confirming the divine grace and imperial authority of the conqueror. With his conquest, the Chakravartin unified India as a "moral empire" governed by a higher order. The Buddhist Digha Nikaya (Chapter 26.6-7), also talks about a wheel-turning monarch (Cakravartin), who propagates Dharma in the four corners under his rulership.

== Religious conquest ==
According to Sax, the religious connotation to the term digvijaya may have emerged as a response to the decline of the imperial digvijaya, consequent to the Muslim conquest of most of India.

=== Madhva Digvijayam ===
Sumadhva Vijaya, ("The story of the victory of Madhva,") also referred as Sri Madhva Vijaya, (or simply as Madhva Vijaya) is a 14th-century hagiographical work of the Dvaita philosopher Madhvacharya. It was composed by Narayana Panditacharya, who was the son of Trivikrama Panditacharya, a direct disciple of Madhvacharya and a famous Advaita exponent before his conversion to the Madhva tradition.

Sumadhva Vijaya is a Mahakavya, ('great poem'), a specific Sanskrit literary genre, containing sixteen "sargas" or cantos. It starts with a description of the first two avatars of Vayu, namely Hanuman and Bhima. It then proceeds to describe the life of Madhva, who is considered the third avatar, giving detailed descriptions of various incidents of Madhva's life.

Several commentaries have been written on it, including one written by Narayana Panditacharya, called Bhava Prakashika. The next oldest commentary on Sumadhva Vijaya is by Vedanga Tirtha, called Padartha Dipika. Another relevant commentary is the Padartha Dipikodbodhika by Vishwapati Tirtha of Pejawara Matha. "Mandopakarini" of Chalari Sheshacharya is also quite popular

=== Shankara Vijayams ===
Shankara Vijayams (IAST Śaṃkaravijayaṃ) are traditional hagiographies of the Advaita Vedanta exegete Adi Shankara, describing his 'conquest of the four quarters'. In these hagiographies, Shankara is deified as a ruler-renunciate, bringing harmony to the four quarters. The genre may have been modelled on the digvijayas of Madhva, since one of the earliest Shankara-hagiography post-dates Madhva (1238–1317). The Shankara-digvijayams mimick the royal digvijayams, as his 'conquest of the four quarters' and the establishment of his kingdom is followed by his coronation with this ascent of the Throne of Omniscience (sarvajña-pīṭha), akin to the rajasuya rites.

The main Shankaravijayams are:

- Madhavīya Shankara (Dig)vijayam (of Madhava). Traditionally attributed to Madhava-Vidyaranya (14th century). According to Isayeva, the work contains almost no new material at all and mostly follows earlier sources; yet, according to Sundaresan, source such as chidvilasiya digvijaya may actually be the source based on Vidyaranya's digvijaya, and this work may contain "deliberate [...] textual manipulations." The attribution and dating is disputed; the author was named Madhavi, and a late dating of the 17th or even 18th century has been proposed, (Note: Isayeva refers to W.R. Antarkar (1972), Sanksepa Sankara Jaya of Madhavacarya or Sankara Digvijaya of Sri Vidyaranyamuni. Goodding refers to Jonathan Bader (2000), Conquest of the four quarters: traditional accounts of the life of Śaṅkara, p.55-56, n.75) and critics have even proposed that the text was written, or extensively reworked, in the 19th century. These dates and suggestions are based on Antarkar's 1972 critique, which are rejected on the account of him seeming to have sided with Kanchi Peetham's views, and ignoring problems with the source-texts.
- Brihat Shankaravijayam, no complete extant text. Traditionally attributed to Chitsukha(12th to early part of the 13th century). According to Isayeva, the earliest of all Shankara's biographies, though could possibly include a later forging, and controversial within the contemporary Advaita-tradition. According to Sundaresan, "all claims about Citsukha and his Brhat Sankaravijaya ultimately derive from a highly questionable, solitary source," and "[i]t is questionable if the text [...] ever existed.", though Narayan Shastri claims to possess its manuscript in the library of madras.
- Pracina-sankara-vijaya, also called Anandagirīya Shankaravijayam, no complete extant text and is only available in excerpts, attributed to Anandagiri (13th to early part of 14th century). According to Isayeva "the most authoritative, reliable and the most widely-cited hagiography of Sankara." It is frequently cited by followers of the Kanchi Kamakoti Peetham, but rejected by followers of the Sringeri Sharada Peetham According to Sundaresan, "quotations attributed to it must be viewed critically."
- Cidvilāsīya Shankaravijayam, attributed to Chidvilasa, c. between 15th century and 17th century
- Keralīya Shankaravijayam, extant in Kerala, c. 17th century)

== See also ==
- Shiva Digvijaya

== Sources ==
- Bader, Jonathan (2001), Conquest of the Four Quarters. TYraditional Accounts of the Life of Shankara, Australian National University
- Clark, Matthew (2006), The Daśanāmī-Saṃnyāsīs: The Integration of Ascetic Lineages into an Order, BRILL
- Goodding, Robert A. (2013), "A Theologian in a South Indian Kingdom: The Historical Context of the Jivanmuktiviveka of Vidyaranya", in Lindquist, Steven E. (ed.), Religion and Identity in South Asia and Beyond: Essays in Honor of Patrick Olivelle, Anthem Press
- Isayeva, Natalia (1993). Shankara and Indian Philosophy. Albany: State University of New York Press (SUNY). ISBN 0-7914-1282-2.
- Nowicka, Olga (2016), "Conquering the World, Subduing the Minds: Śaṅkara's digvijaya in the Local Context", Cracow Indological Studies, 18 (18): 145–166, doi:10.12797/CIS.18.2016.18.07
- Raveh, Daniel (2016), Sūtras, Stories and Yoga Philosophy: Narrative and Transfiguration, Routledge
- Simmons, Caleb (2019), Devotional Sovereignty: Kingship and Religion in India, Oxford University Press
- Siraj, S.Anees (2012), Karnataka State: Udupi District, Government of Karnataka, Karnataka Gazetteer Department
- Sharma, B. N. Krishnamurti (2000). A History of the Dvaita School of Vedānta and Its Literature, Vol 1. 3rd Edition. Motilal Banarsidass (2008 Reprint). ISBN 978-8120815759.
- Sundaresan, Vidyasankar (2000). "Conflicting hagiographies and history: The place of Śaṅkaravijaya texts in Advaita tradition" (PDF). International Journal of Hindu Studies. 4 (2). Springer: 109–184. doi:10.1007/s11407-000-0004-7.
