= Khaṭvāṅga =

Staff associated with Indian religions

Khatvanga
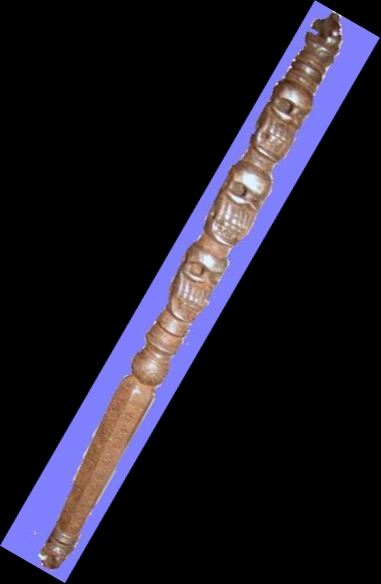
- Khatvanga
- Devanagari: खट्वाङ्ग
- Sanskrit transliteration: Khaṭvāṅga

A khaṭvāṅga (Sanskrit: खट्वाङ्ग) is a long, studded staff or club with a skull at the top. The weapon is found in the iconography of Tantric Hindu as well as Tibetian Vajrayana Buddhism. It is variously described as "a skull-topped club, a skull-mounted trident, or a trident staff on which three skulls are impaled".

== Fabrication ==
Originally, the khatvāṅga was made of bones, especially the long bones of forearm or the leg of human beings or animals. Later, wood and metal were used. The khatvāṅga is a long club with skulls engraved on the body.

== Hinduism ==
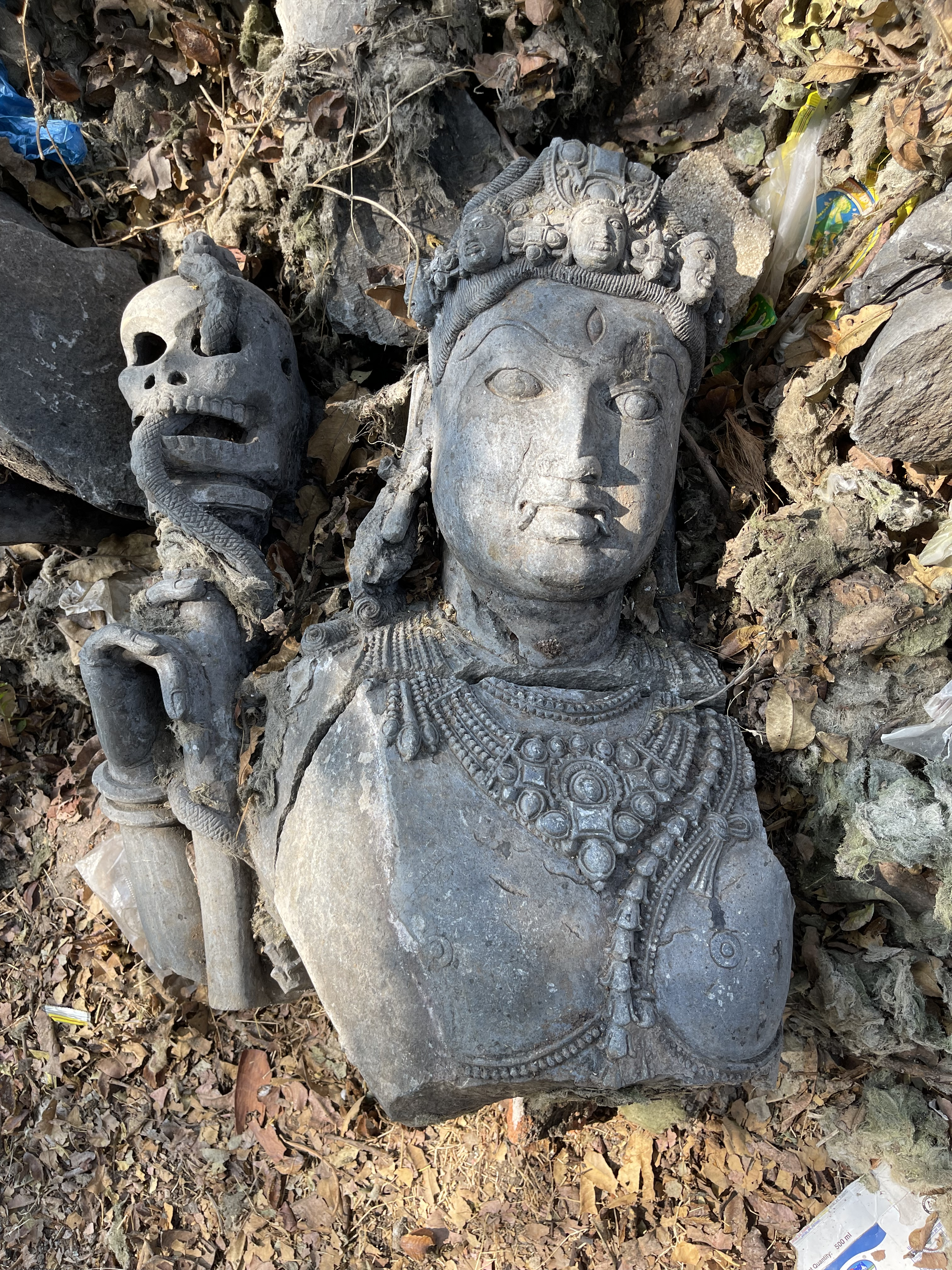
Guard of lord Shiva — Bhringi, holding a Khatvanga, Kadile Papahareshwar Temple at Nirmala, Telangana, India

The Hindu deity Shiva is sometimes depicted carrying the khatvanga, thus referred by the epithet khatvāṅgī. The weapon is referred in Bhavabhuti's Mālatīmādhava and Śiva Stutī of Narayana Panditacharya.

The kapalikas were originally miscreants who had been sentenced to a twelve-year term of penance for the crime of inadvertently killing a Brahmin. The penitent was prescribed to dwell in a forest hut, at a desolate crossroads, in a charnel ground, or under a tree; to live by begging; to practice austerities; and to wear a loin-cloth of hemp, dog, or donkey-skin. They also had to carry the emblems of a human skull as an alms-bowl, and the skull of the Brahmin they had slain mounted upon a wooden staff as a banner. These Hindu kapalika ascetics soon evolved into extreme outcaste adherents of the "left-hand" Tantric path (Sanskrit: Vāmamārga) of shakti or goddess worship.

== Vajrayana Buddhism ==
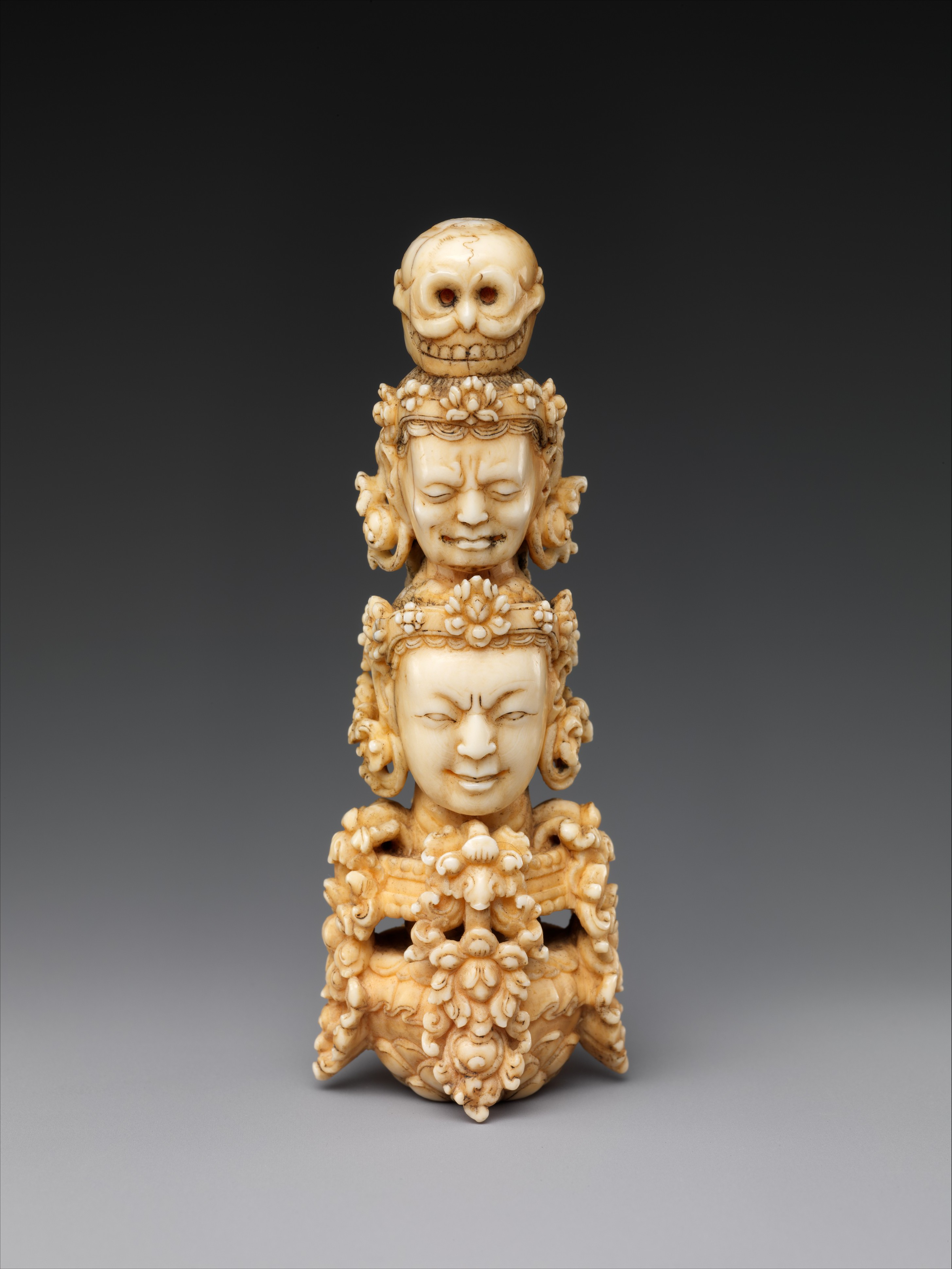
Pictured here is an ivory khaṭvāṅga, 15th-century Chinese art, Metropolitan Museum of Art.

In the Vajrayana of Tibetan Buddhism, the symbol of the skull-topped trident (khaṭvānga) is said to be inspired by its association with the Kāpālikas.

Khatvanga is originally understood as Tibetan Hayagriva's weapon. It evolved as a traditional ritualistic symbol in Tibetan religions and Tantric traditions like Vajrayana Buddhism, and in the Vajrayana of Tibetan Buddhism. The khatvānga was also used as tribal shaman shafts.

Author Robert Beer states that "the form of the Buddhist khaṭvāṅga derived from the emblematic staff of the early Indian Shaivite yogis, known as kapalikas or "skull-bearers". The early Buddhist tantric yogins and yoginis adopted the same goddess or dakini attributes of the kapalikas. These attributes consisted of bone ornaments, an animal skin loincloth, marks of human ash, a skull-cup, damaru, flaying knife, thighbone trumpet, and the skull-topped Tantric staff or khaṭvāṅga.

Robert Beer relates how the symbolism of the khatvāṅga in the Vajrayana of Tibetan Buddhism, particularly the Nyingma school founded by Padmasambhava, was a direct borrowing from the Shaiva Kapalikas, who frequented places of austerity such as charnel grounds and crossroads as a form of "left-handed path" (vamachara) sādhanā. In Padmasambhava's iconographic representations, the khatvanga represents his scribe, biographer and spiritual consort Yeshe Tsogyal. The weapon's three severed heads denotes moksha from the three worlds (Trailokya); it has a rainbow sash representing the Five Pure Lights of the mahābhūta.
