= Sadh Vaishnavism =

Tradition in Hinduism linked to Dvaita Vedanta

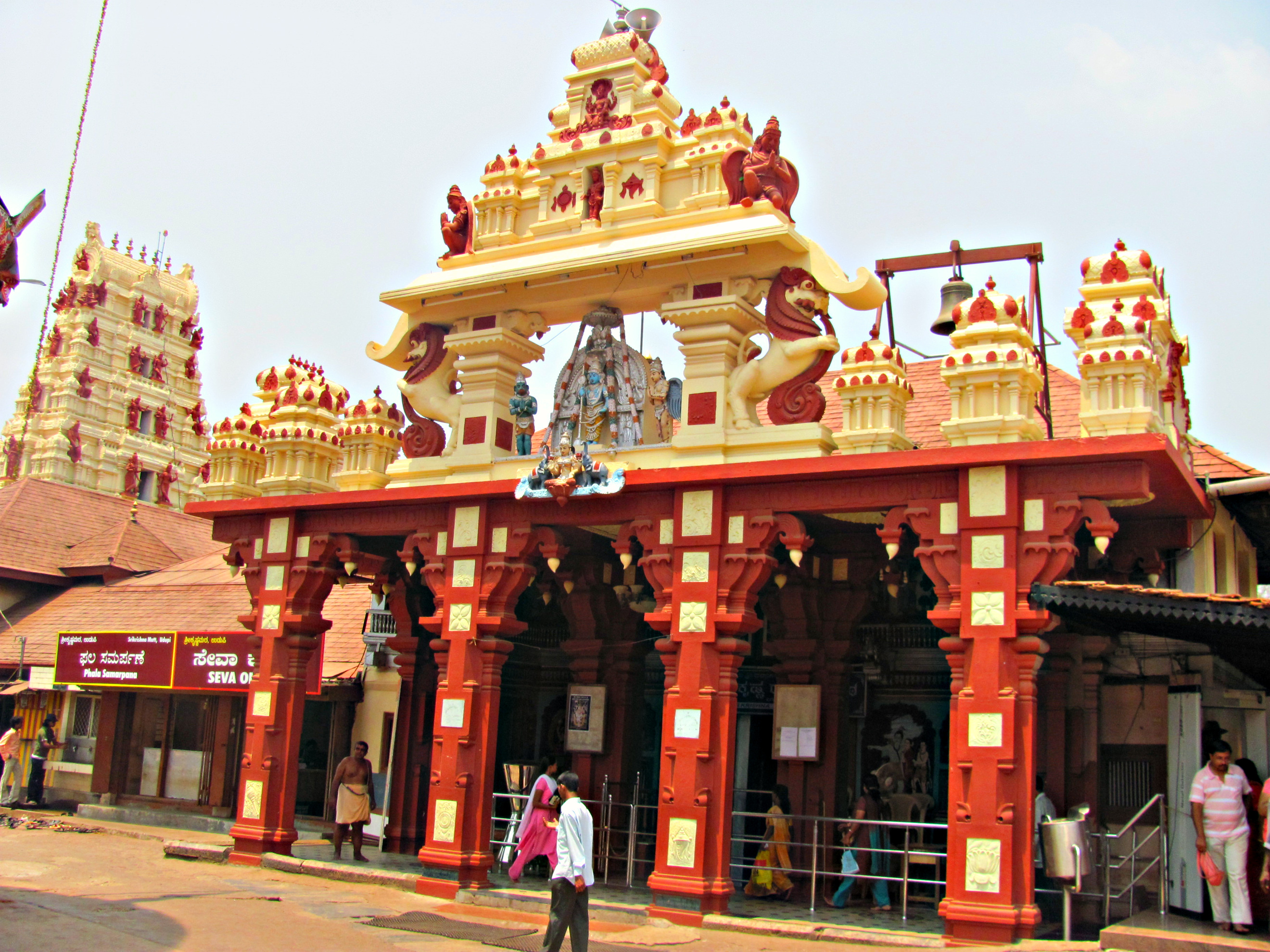
- The Entrance to Sri Krishna Matha at Udupi

Regions with significant populations
- Karnataka, Maharashtra, Tamil Nadu, Andhra Pradesh

Religions
- Vaishnavism (Hinduism)

Scriptures
- Vedas, Upanishads, Bhagavat Gita, Brahma Sutra, Pancharatra, Bhagavata Purana, Mahabharata, Ramayana, Sarvamula Granthas

Languages
- Sanskrit, Kannada

Sadh Vaishnavism (Sanskrit: सद्वैष्णवसम्प्रदाय; (Note: In order to distinguish it from Sri Vaishnavism of Ramanujacharya, Sri Madhva named his Vaishnavism as Sad Vaishnavism.)), also referred to as Madhva Vaishnavism, the Madhva Sampradaya, or Tattvavada, part of the Brahma Sampradaya, is a denomination within the Vaishnavism—Bhagavata tradition of Hinduism. Sadh Vaishnavism was founded by the thirteenth century philosopher-saint Madhvacharya, who developed the Tattvavada (Dvaita Vedanta) ("arguments from a realist viewpoint") sub-school of Vedanta in Hindu philosophy.

The tradition traces its roots to the ancient Vedas and Pancharatra texts. The Madhva Sampradaya or Sadh-Vaishnava Sampradaya is referred to as the Brahma Sampradaya, referring to its traditional origins in the succession of spiritual masters (gurus) have originated from Brahma.

Madhva championed the ultimate reality as personal and Saguna Brahman ("the absolute with qualities") and it is Lord Vishnu (Narayana). Hence god Vishnu (Narayana) along with his consort Lakshmi, and their divine incarnations and forms are revered and worshipped in this tradition. In Sadh-Vaishnavism, the creator is superior to the creation, and hence moksha comes only from the grace of Vishnu, but not from effort alone. In Sad Vaishnavism Jnana, Bhakti and Vairagya are necessary steps for moksha and doing Karma is also considered a form of puja. Hence in Sad Vaishnavism, Jnana Yoga, Bhakti Yoga and Karma Yoga are equally important in order to attain liberation (moksha) compared to Sri Vaishnavism where bhakti yoga alone is enough to attain moksha. However Madhva holds the perspective that not all jivas are destined for liberation and rejects the idea of an inherent principle linking a jiva's existence with liberation. However, he acknowledges the presence of divine grace at work within chosen individuals.

== Etymology ==
The term Sadh-Vaishnavism is derived from sadh, meaning "true", and the Hindu deity Vishnu, whose worshipers are known as Vaishnava; this name of the tradition may thus be translated as "true Vaishnavism." The term Madhva is derived from the name of the tradition's founder, Madhvacharya. The term sampradaya refers to a Hindu religious tradition. The followers of Sat-Vaishnavism are known as Sat-Vaishnavas.

== Philosophy and theology ==
=== Tattvavada (Dvaita) ===
Sat-Vaishnavism's philosophical foundation was established by Madhva, who started his Vedic studies with Achyutapreksha in an Advaita Vedanta monastery. But there was constant disagreement between the master and the disciple and the studies soon ended. However, he sought initiation at the hands of this guru under the name of Poornaprajna and wrote his commentaries under the name Ananda Tirtha. Madhvacharya converted his own guru Achyutapreksha to Dvaita Vedanta, like Ramanuja converting his Advaita guru Yadavapreksha renaming him Govindasure to Vishistadvaita. Madhva brought Vedantic and Upanishadic ideas to this tradition, and wrote texts on dualism, called Dvaita in the Hindu tradition. His ideas are one of three subschools in Vedanta, the other two are known as Adi Shankara's Advaita (absolute monism) and Ramanujacharya's Vishistadvaita (qualified monism).

According to Madhva, the Divine and the soul are completely distinct from each other. The Madhva Sampradaya worships Vishnu as the highest Hindu deity and regards Madhva, whom they consider to be an incarnation of Vishnu's son, Vayu, as an incarnate saviour. Madhvism regards Vayu as Vishnu's agent in this world, and Hanuman, Bhima, and Madhvacharya to be his three incarnations; for this reason, the roles of Hanuman in the Ramayana and Bhima in the Mahabharata are emphasised, and Madhvacharya is particularly held in high esteem. Vayu is prominently shown by Madhva in countless texts.

Madhvacharya was a staunch Vaishnava who pushed strongly the belief that Vishnu was the highest of Hindu deities, and refused to accept any claims that other Hindu deities might be equally as high. Madhvacharya says that in the beginning there was only one God and that was Narayana or Vishnu. Madhvacharya states that the ultimate divine reality, which Hindu traditions refer to as Brahman, and the individual souls, known as jīvātmans, exist as independent realities and that these are distinct. Madhva states "brahmaśabdaśca Viṣṇaveva", that Brahman can only refer to Vishnu. According to Madhvism, Vishnu was not just any other deva, but rather the one and only Supreme Being. Madhvacharya also asserted, yathecchasi tatha kuru, which Sharma translates and explains as "one has the right to choose between right and wrong, a choice each individual makes out of his own responsibility and his own risk". In Madhva Sampradaya, all devatas including Vishnu, Lakshmi, Brahma, Vayu, Saraswati, Bharati, Shiva, Parvati, Subrahmanya and Ganesha are worshipped according to "Taratamya Bedha". In fact, Madhvacharya in his Tantra Sara Sangraha clearly explained how to worship all devatas. In many of his works Madhvacharya explained about Shiva Tattva, the procedure to worship Panchamukha Shiva (Rudra), and the Panchakshari Mantra— Om Namah Shivaya and even clearly explained why everyone should worship Shiva. Many prominent saints and scholars wrote Stotras, Stutis and songs on Shiva in Madhva Sampradaya such is the importance given to Lord Shiva in Madhva Sampradaya. Vyasatirtha composed "Laghu Shiva Stuti", Narayana Panditacharya composed Shiva Stuti and Satyadharma Tirtha wrote a commentary on Sri Rudram (Namaka Chamaka). Indologist B. N. K. Sharma says These are positive proofs of the fact that Madhvas are not bigots opposed to the worship of Shiva. Sharma says, Vaishnavism of Madhvacharya is more tolerant and accommodative of the worship of other gods such as Shiva, Parvati, Ganesha, Subrahmanya and others of the Hindu pantheon. This is the reason why Kanaka Dasa though under the influence of Tathacharya in his early life did not subscribe wholly to the dogmas of Sri Vaishnavism against the worship of Shiva etc., and later became the disciple of Vyasatirtha.

Madhva rejects Shankara's conception of the Nirguna Brahman—that is, Brahman without characterisations—and accepts the conception of the Saguna Brahman—that is, Brahman with characterisations—as the ultimate divine reality. In Madhva philosophy, Brahman possesses all positive qualities; at the root of these are existence, consciousness, and bliss. An impersonal Brahman, such as Shankara's Nirguna Brahman cannot perform these functions. For Madhva, the personal Brahman is not different from Vishnu, whom Vaishnavas consider to be the creator, the maintainer and destroyer of the world. According to the Madhva viewpoint, nothing can condition Brahman. According to Madhva, Brahman is neither the limited infinite divine reality of the Nyaya school nor a being in inseparable relation with matter and selves as in the philosophy of Ramanuja. Rather, Brahman is viewed as completely independent, but whilst the jivas are viewed as dependent upon Brahman for activity, knowledge, and existence. According to the Vaishnava viewpoint, Vishnu creates the world by his will and brings into existence the world of objects and selves. Objects and selves, though real and irreducible to each other, are dependent on Brahman. At the time of dissolution of the world, material and objects are considered to be transformed into undifferentiated matter and selves into disembodied intelligence by Brahman; it is believed, even in the state of dissolution, that Brahman, matter, and the jivas remain distinct from one another, and do not merge with one another.

== Haridasa movement ==
The devotional movement of the Haridasa of Karnataka was an expression of Madhva's religious thought. The Haridasa movement initiated by Madhva has had a deep impact on the people in different parts of the country. The Haridasas were mostly Madhwas and almost exclusively of the Brahmin community.

== Influence ==
According to Sharma, the influence of Dvaita Vedanta ideas have been most prominent on the Chaitanya school of Bengal Vaishnavism, whose devotees started the International Society for Krishna Consciousness (ISKCON) - known colloquially as the Hare Krishna Movement. and also in Assam. Chaitanya Mahaprabhu(1496-1534) is said to be a disciple of Isvara Puri who was a disciple of Madhavendra Puri who was a disciple of Lakshmipati Tirtha who was a disciple of Vyasatirtha(1469-1539) of Madhvacharya's Sampradaya. Gujarat Vaishnava culture is also influenced by the Madhva philosophy.

== Institutions ==
Madhvacharya established many Mathas by defeating various acharyas of different sampradayas. The followers of Madhva are of many distinct groups, they are, the Tuluvas, the Kannadigas, the Marathis, the Telugus, the Tamilians, the Biharis, the Malayalis, and the Konkanis. Thus there are twenty-four separate institutions of the Madhva-Vaishnava faith.

=== Tuluva Mathas ===
The mathas present in the Tulu region are called Tuluva Mathas. Most of the Tulu-Speaking in the Tulu region and Malayalam-Speaking people in the Kerala region who follow Madhvacharya's philosophy are followers of the twelve Madhva Mathas. The twelve Madhva Mathas are Pejawara Matha, Palimaru Matha, Adamaru Matha, Puttige Matha, Sodhe Matha, Kaniyooru Matha, Shiroor Matha, Krishnapura Matha, Bhandarakeri Matha, Subramanya Matha, Chitrapura Matha, Bhimanakatte matha. Out of these twelve Tuluva mathas, eight are part of the Ashta (eight) mathas of Udupi who take turns once every two years (Paryaya) to worship Lord Krishna in at Udupi. These twelve mathas are descended from Madhvacharya's direct disciples, Adhokshaja Teertha, Hrishikesha Teertha, Narasimha Teertha, Upendra Teertha, Rama Teertha, Vamana Teertha, Janardhana Teertha and Madhva's brother Vishnu Tirtha.

=== Deshastha Mathas or Deccan Plateau Mathas ===
Along with Ashta Mathas of Udupi Madhvacharya also founded a matha with his disciple Padmanabha Tirtha as its Peetadhipathi to spread Tattvavada (Dvaita) Vedanta outside the Tulunadu region with instructions that his disciples Narahari Tirtha, Madhava Tirtha, Akshobya Tirtha should be future successors of this matha. According to Surendranath Dasgupta, Uttaradi Math is the main matha of Madhvacharya and it was divided twice, so we end up with three mathas, the other two being Vyasaraja Math and Raghavendra Math. All the mathas outside Tulunadu region are one way or other descended from Padmanabha Tirtha. Since Padmanabha Tirtha was from Desh region all the mathas descended from him are known as Deshastha Mathas or Deccan plateau Mathas. Marathi, Kannada, Telugu, Hindi, Bihari, Tamil, speaking people following Madhvacharya outside Tulunadu and Konkan regions are all followers of these ten Madhva Mathas. Most of peetadhipathis who presided over these ten mathas belonged to Deshastha Brahmin community. These ten Madhva Mathas are, Uttaradi Matha, Vyasaraja Matha, Raghavendra Matha, Sripadaraja Matha, Kanva Matha, Kudli Matha, Tambehalli Matha (also known as Majjigehalli Maṭha), Kundapura Vyasaraja Matha, Sagarakatte Matha, Baligaru Matha.

Mathatraya of Desh

Mathatraya are the three mathas which are descended in the lineage of Madhvacharya's direct disciples, Padmanabha Tirtha, Narahari Tirtha, Madhava Tirtha, Akshobya Tirtha. Jayatirtha succeeded the main matha after Akshobya Tirtha. Uttaradi Matha, Vyasaraja Matha and Raghavendra Math are descended from Jayatirtha. Uttaradi Matha, Vyasaraja Matha and Raghavendra Matha are considered to be the three premier apostolic institutions of Dvaita Vedanta and are jointly referred as Mathatraya . It is the pontiffs and pandits of the Mathatraya that have been the principle architects of post-Madhva Dvaita Vedanta through the centuries. As a matter of fact, these have taken the lion's share in the task of developing and propagating the philosophy of Madhva. For this reason they can unhesitatingly be regarded as the intellectual heirs to the legacy of Madhva, Jayatirtha and Vyasatirtha.

Mathatraya of Desha
Matha	Present Swamiji
Uttaradi Matha	Satyatma Tirtha
Raghavendra Matha	Subhudhendra Tirtha
Vyasaraja Matha	Vidyashrisha Tirtha

=== Konkani Mathas ===
Gaud Saraswat Brahmins and other Saraswat Brahmins who follow Madhvacharya and his philosophy Dvaita Vedanta are followers of two Madhva Mathas. They are mainly concentrated in the Konkan coast (including Goa), Malabar Coast of Karnataka and Kerala, and Uttar Pradesh mainly Varanasi and surrounding areas. These two Saraswat Mathas are Kashi Math and Gokarna Math.

== Prominent Madhva teachers ==
Some of the prominent Madhva teachers include:

- Padmanabha Tirtha
- Narahari Tirtha
- Akshobhya Tirtha
- Jaya Tirtha
- Sripadaraja Tirtha
- Vyasa Tirtha
- Raghuttama Tirtha
- Vadiraja Tirtha
- Vijayendra Tirtha
- Sudhindra Tirtha
- Satyanatha Tirtha
- Raghavendra Tirtha

== See also ==
- Madhvacharya
- Dvaita Vedanta
- Vaishnavism
- Bhagavatism
- Madhva Vaishnavas
- Gaudiya Vaishnavism
- Chaitanya Mahaprabhu
