= Narasimha Nakha Stuti =

Hindu devotional hymn by Madhvacharya

Information
- Religion: Hinduism
- Author: Madhvacharya
- Language: Sanskrit
- Period: 13th century
- Verses: 2

Narasimha Nakha Stuti (also popularly Nakha Stuti), is one of the most famous and short Stutis (poems) composed by Madhvacharya in praise of nails of Narasimha written in Sragdhara metre. Stuti means eulogy, singing praise, panegyric and to praise the virtues, deeds and nature of God by realising them in our hearts. In this stuti Madhvacharya eulogised the power of Narasimha and his nails. Indologist B. N. K. Sharma says, "According to tradition, Madhva composed these two verses and had them prefixed to his disciple's Vayu Stuti, extolling Madhva in his three 'incarnations', as he did not approve of the disciple's praising him, exclusively. They are now recited as part of the Vayu Stuti, at the beginning and at the end".

== Bibliography ==
- Ivan, D’Souza (2021). A Hermeneutical Investigation of Super-Primary Meaning in the Dvaita Vedānta of Madhva. Cambridge Scholars Publishing. ISBN 9781527574250.
- Sharma, B. N. Krishnamurti (2000). A History of the Dvaita School of Vedānta and Its Literature, Vol 1. 3rd Edition. Motilal Banarsidass (2008 Reprint). ISBN 978-8120815759.
- Arapura, J.G. (2012), Gnosis and the Question of Thought in Vedānta: Dialogue with the Foundations, Springer, ISBN 978-9400943391
