= Niranjan =

Sanskrit term in Hindu religious scripture

Niranjana (Sanskrit: निरंजन, romanized: niranjana), also rendered Niranjan, is an epithet in Hinduism. It is a title of Krishna according to the Bhagavad Gita, and is also an epithet of Shiva.

== Etymology ==
Niranjan in Sanskrit means the one without blemishes or the one who is spotless and pure. nir means less (as in e.g. motionless) and anjana means black colouring matter.

== Description ==
- Niranjan means the lord of the three worlds, the physical, the astral and the causal and according to the Bhagavad Gita.
- The saint Kabir described God as Niranjan. Niranjan means is translated as without collyrium, or the spotless or immaculate God, and it is used to address Rama.
- It is also 52nd name of the 108 names of Krishna as it appears in the Sri Krishna Ashtottara Shatanama Stotra.
- In Dvadasha stotra, composed by Jagadguru Madhvacharya, the word Niranjan is explained as one the quality of Krishna.
