= Vyasaraya Ballal =

- Born: 1 December 1923; Ambalapady, Udupi district, Karnataka
- Died: 30 January 2008 (aged 84); Bangalore, Karnataka
- Occupation: Writer

Vyasaraya Ballal (1 December 1923 – 30 January 2008) was a major writer in the Kannada language and Sahitya Academy Award winner for his novel Bandaya in 1986. His Novels Hemanthagaana, Uttarayana and Bandaya are the major contributions to the Kannada Novel.

== Career ==
Ballal was extremely sensitive in his portrayal of women in his works such as Anurakte, Vatsalya Patha, Hemanthagana, and Uttarayana. A critical analysis on Ballal’s novels titled Ballalara Kadambarigalu was brought out by MGM College under the stewardship of its then principal and writer Ku. Shi. Haridasa Bhat.

"Yet some questions still remain a mystery. Why did Ballal not choose to lead his retired life in Udupi, where he was born? Why was Ballal not chosen as president of the 74th All India Kannada Sahitya Sammelan held in Udupi? These questions will torment us for a long time," Prof. Hiriyadka said.

Vyasaraya Ballal had started his literary life by his contributions to a Kannada journal Nudi started in Mumbai. In fact his first novel Anurakte had appeared as a serial in Nudi. It was later published as a novel.

Vyasaraya Ballal and other friends in Mumbai, who were filled with ideas of securing freedom for the country and socialism, and the importance of Kannada.

Ballal writings also focussed on the importance of Kannada medium and Kannada learning.

Ballal’s candidature for the post of the president of 74th All India Kannada Sahitya Sammelan in Udupi was not pursued vigorously.

Ballal was a man of few words. He was a sensitive person and this sensitivity was reflected in his works. Ballal brought forth beautifully the working of trade unions in his novel Bandaya.

Vyasaraya Ballala was known for his revolutionary thinking and had written more than 25 books including novels, 100 short stories, politics, two plays and children's books. His novel 'Uttarayana' is acclaimed as his best work, while two other books 'Bandaya' and 'Manjari' received wide critical acclaim. 'Bandaya' brought him Kendra Sahitya Akademi award. The writer, who lived in Mumbai for five decades, had contributed short stories for Akashvani-Mumbai. He also served as the editor of 'Nudi', a Kannada weekly published by Kamaladevi Chattopadhay. He was a prominent member of Karnataka Sangha in Mumbai and also contributed to the columns in the dailies. After his retirement, Mr Ballala settled in Bangalore where he continued to write. Mr Ballala was a disappointed man lately as his name was not considered by the Central Office of Kannada Sahitya Parishat (KSP) for the presidency of 74th 'Akhila Bharatha Kannada Sahitya Sammelan' held in Udupi last month. He was born in Ambalapady near Udupi in 1923. His childhood was tough and after his matriculation he went to Mumbai and worked as a steno in a private company.

== Novels ==
- Anurakhte/ಅನುರಕ್ತೆ
- Hemanthagaana/ಹೇಮಂತಗಾನ
- Vatsalyapatha/ವಾತ್ಸಲ್ಯಪಥ
- Uttarayana/ಉತ್ತರಾಯಣ
- Bandaya/ಬಂಡಾಯ
- Aakashakkonndu Kandilu/ಆಕಾಶಕ್ಕೊಂದು ಕಂದೀಲು
- Hejje/ಹೆಜ್ಜೆ
- Hejje Gurutu/ಹೆಜ್ಜೆ ಗುರುತು (Sequel to Hejje)

== Short stories ==
- Badukina Aadarsha/ಬದುಕಿನ ಆದರ್ಶ
- Kadumallige/ಕಾಡುಮಲ್ಲಿಗೆ
- Sampigeya Hoo/ಸಂಪಿಗೆಯ ಹೂ
- Manjari/ಮಂಜರಿ
- Trikaala/ತ್ರಿಕಾಲ
- Aayda Kathegalu/ಆಯ್ದ ಕತೆಗಳು
- Samagra Kathegalu/ಸಮಗ್ರ ಕತೆಗಳು

== Travelogue ==
- Naanobba Bharathiya Pravasi/ನಾನೊಬ್ಬ ಭಾರತೀಯ ಪ್ರವಾಸಿ

== Life Experiences ==
- Mumbai Dinanka/ಮುಂಬಯಿ ದಿನಾಂಕ

== Drama ==
- Giliyu Panjaradolilla/ಗಿಳಿಯು ಪಂಜರದೊಳಿಲ್ಲ
- Mullellide Mandara!/ಮುಳ್ಳೆಲ್ಲಿದೆ ಮಂದಾರ!

== Others ==
- Samagra Bharathayana/ಸಮಗ್ರ ಭಾರತಾಯಣ
- Kalavida Hebbarara Rekha Lavanya/ಕಲಾವಿದ ಹೆಬ್ಬಾರರ ರೇಖಾ ಲಾವಣ್ಯ
- Aadhunika Sahitya Mimaamse/ಆಧುನಿಕ ಸಾಹಿತ್ಯ ಮೀಮಾಂಸೆ
- Kattuvevu Naavu/ಕಟ್ಟುವೆವು ನಾವು
- Swantathryakke 50 Varsha /ಸ್ವಾತಂತ್ರ್ಯಕ್ಕೆ ೫೦ ವರ್ಷ

== About Him/His Literature ==
- Akkare - Felicitation Volume/ಅಕ್ಕರೆ - ಅಭಿನಂದನ ಗ್ರಂಥ
- Vyasaraya Ballala - G. N. Upadhya/ವ್ಯಾಸರಾಯ ಬಲ್ಲಾಳ - ಜಿ.ಎನ್.ಉಪಾಧ್ಯ
- Vyasaraya Ballala - M. Vijayalakshmi/ವ್ಯಾಸರಾಯ ಬಲ್ಲಾಳ - ಎಂ. ವಿಜಯಲಕ್ಷ್ಮಿ

== Awards and honours ==
- State Award for "Anurakthe" (1957)
- Kendra Sahitya Akademi Award for "Bandaya" (1986)
- Karnataka Sahitya Akademi Award for "Bandaya" (1987)
- Karnataka Sahitya Akademi Award for "Naanobba Bharathiya Pravasi" (1988)
- Maharashtra Shasan Puraskar for "Bandaya" (1990)
- Karnataka Sahitya Akademi Honorary Award for Lifetime Achievement (1983)
- Gadyabhaskara Award (1996)
- B. M. Shrikanthayya Award (1995)
- A. N. Krishnarao Award (2000)
- Niranjana Award (2000)
- Paryaya Award (2004)
- Masti Award (2004)

== Movies and Teleserial ==
- Anurakhte/ಅನುರಕ್ತೆ
- Vatsalyapatha/ವಾತ್ಸಲ್ಯಪಥ
- Bandha/ಬಂಧ (DD Chandana)
