= Trivikrama Panditacharya =

Personal life
- Born: 1258
- Died: 1320 (aged 61–62)
- Children: Narayana Panditacharya
- Parent: Subramanya Panditacharya (father)
- Notable work(s): Vayu Stuti, Vishnu Stuti, Tithinirnaya, Narasimha Stuti and Madhwa Stotra

Religious life
- Religion: Hinduism
- Philosophy: Dvaita Vedanta

Religious career
- Teacher: Madhvacharya

Sri Trivikrama Panditacharya (c.1258 - c.1320), was an Indian scholar and one of the disciples of Sri Madhvacharya, the great Dvaita philosopher. He composed the Vayu Stuti, one of the most famous Stotras in the Madhva tradition.

== Biography ==
Sri Trivikrama Panditacharya's biographical account is also given with considerable detail by his son Sri Narayana Panditacharya in Sri MadhwaVijaya. Sri Trvivikrama Panditacharya's father was Sri Subramanya Panditacharya.

Sri Trivikrama Panditacharya was a scholar even in his young days and even before he was converted as a Madhwa he had written a Sanskrit mahakavya called "Ushaharana" mahakavya.

Sri Trivikrama Panditacharya was the teacher of the King of Kasaragod called Jayasimha. Once when Sri Madhvacharya visited Kasaragod, he challenged Sri Madhva to a debate, as he believed in the Advaita tradition. The debate lasted for 7–8 days and in the end, he accepted Sri Madhva's philosophy and became his disciple. He also composed a book called Tatva pradeepika, which is a commentary of Sri Madhvacharya's Brahma Sutra Bhashya.

Sri Trivikrama Panditacharya's son, Narayana Panditacharya, composed the famous Madhwavijaya, the biography of Sri Madhvacharya.

== Works ==
Trikirama Pandita composed a kaavya 'Ushaharana' in his teenage. There have been others works accredited to Panditacharya, of which a book called Tattvapradeepa, which is a commentary of Sri Madhvacharya's Brahma Sutra Bhashya and Vayu Stuti are most notable. The attributed works are:

- Vayu Stuti
- Vishnu Stuti
- Narasimha Stuti (in 22 verses)
- Ushaharana
- Madhwa Stotra
- Tattvapradeepa

== Brindavana ==
Brindavana of Sri Trivikrama Panditacharya is located at Kavu Mutt near Kudlu in Kerala (near Kasaragod town in Kerala - Around 45 km from Mangalore City)

== See also ==
- Dvaita Literature

== Bibliography ==
- Bryant, Edwin Francis (2007), Krishna: A Sourcebook, Oxford University Press, ISBN 978-0-19-803400-1
- Siraj, S.Anees (2012), Karnataka State: Udupi District, Government of Karnataka, Karnataka Gazetteer Department
- Sharma, B. N. Krishnamurti (2000). A History of the Dvaita School of Vedānta and Its Literature, Vol 1. 3rd Edition. Motilal Banarsidass (2008 Reprint). ISBN 978-8120815759.

== Footnotes ==
- Sri Madhvacharya
