= Vayu Stuti =

Hindu hymn

The Vayu Stuti (Sanskrit: वायुस्तुति, romanized: Vāyustuti) is a stuti (eulogy) composed by Trivikrama Panditacharya addressed to Madhvacharya, the founder of the Dvaita school of philosophy. The hymn praises Madhvacharya as the third incarnation of the god of the wind, Vayu, after Hanuman and Bhima, a belief held by members of the Madhva tradition.

== Legend ==
Legend has it that during daily puja done by Madhvacharya in the sanctum sanctorum of Udupi Sri Krishna Temple behind closed doors, Trivikrama Panditacharya used to recite the Dvadasha Stotra outside. The end of the naivedya (ceremonial offering of food to the deity) was indicated by the sounding of bells. However, one day, Trivikrama Panditacharya got increasingly curious as the sound of bells was not heard even after a long time. He peeked through the door, and to his amazement, found Madhvacharya performing puja to Rama as Hanuman, to Krishna as Bhima. and to Vyasa as Madhvacharya. Overcome by bhakti (devotion), he composed the Vayu Stuti and dedicated it to Madhvacharya.

== Description ==
The Vayu Stuti is composed of 41 shlokas. It is common to recite the Vayu Stuti by beginning and ending it with the Narasimha Nakha Stuti, a short two-paragraph composition by Madhvacharya praising Narasimha, a practice regarded to have been recommended by Madhvacharya.

== See also ==
- Works of Madhvacharya
- Dvadasha Stotra
- Rukminisha Vijaya
