= Sumadhva Vijaya =

Hagiography of Hindu saint Madhvacharya

Information
- Religion: Hinduism
- Author: Narayana Panditacharya
- Language: Sanskrit
- Period: 14th century
- Chapters: 16 cantos

The Sumadhva Vijaya (also popularly referred as Sri Madhva Vijaya or simply as Madhva Vijaya) ("The story of the victory of Madhva"), is a hagiographic work about the Dvaita philosopher Madhvacharya. It was authored by Narayana Panditacharya, who was the son of Trivikrama Panditacharya, one of the direct disciples of Madhvacharya. Trivikrama Panditacharya was a famous Advaita exponent of his time, graciously accepted the Madhva tradition after the historical debate with Madhvacharya himself for about 15 days, at Vishnumangala in Kasaragod. He is also the author of the Vayu Stuti.

The Sumadhva Vijaya is a Sanskrit work and is composed of 16 sargas or cantos. It starts with a description of the first two avatars of Vayu, namely Hanuman and Bhima. It then proceeds to describe the life of Madhvacharya, described to be the third avatar. The Sumadhva Vijaya contains detailed descriptions of various incidents of Madhva's life and is the only authentic source of information about Madhvacharya that exists. The work contains many personal and intimate details of Madhvacharya's daily routine.

The Sumadhva Vijaya is a mahakavya. It has several commentaries written regarding it, such as one by Narayana Panditacarya called the Bhava Prakashika. This work offers Kannada and Tulu names of several persons who are a part of Madhvacharya's biography and lists the places Madhvacharya had visited. The next oldest commentary on the Sumadhva Vijaya is by Vedanga Tirtha, one of the saints of the Sode Matha, called the Padartha Dipika. Another commentary is the Padartha Dipikodbodhika of Vishwapati Tirtha of Pejavara Matha. The Mandopakarini of Chalari Sheshacharya is also quite popular. The Sumadhva Vijaya has also been recited by many artists, such as Vidyabhushana.

== See also ==
- Digvijaya (conquest)
- Dvaita
- Madhvacharya
- Narayana Panditacharya
