= Rajyotsava Awards (2007) =

Awards given by the government of Karnataka, India

2007 Rajyotsava Awards
- Date: 1 November 2007
- Location: Bangalore, Karnataka
- Country: India
- Presented by: Government of Karnataka

The list of Karnataka Rajyotsava Award recipients for the year 2007 is below.

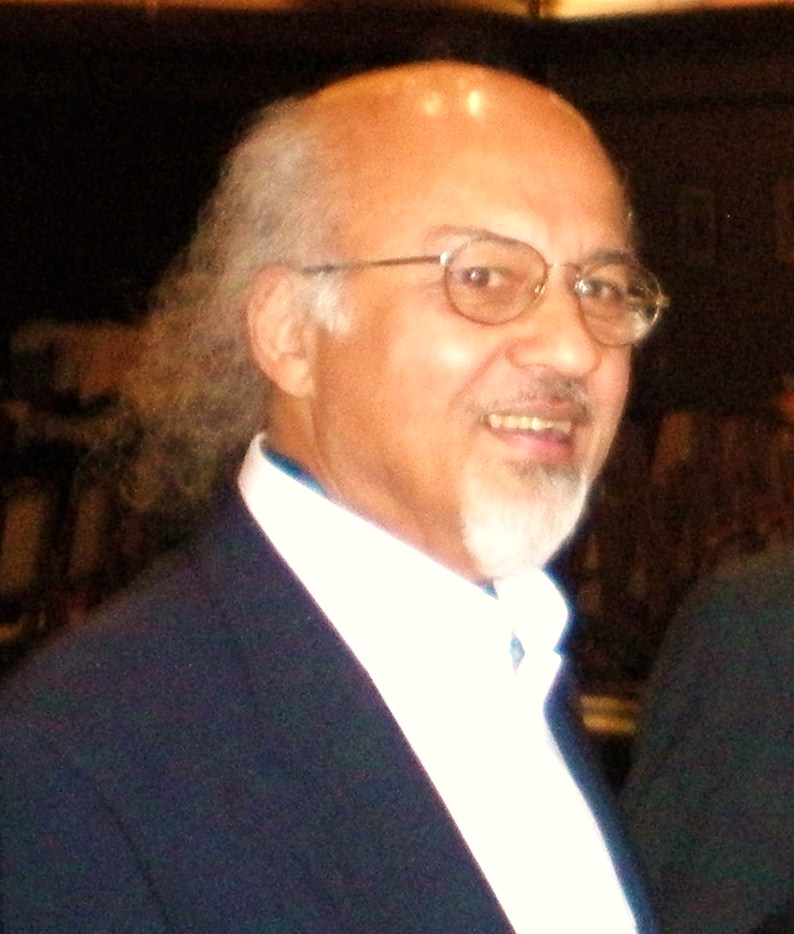
T. J. S. George

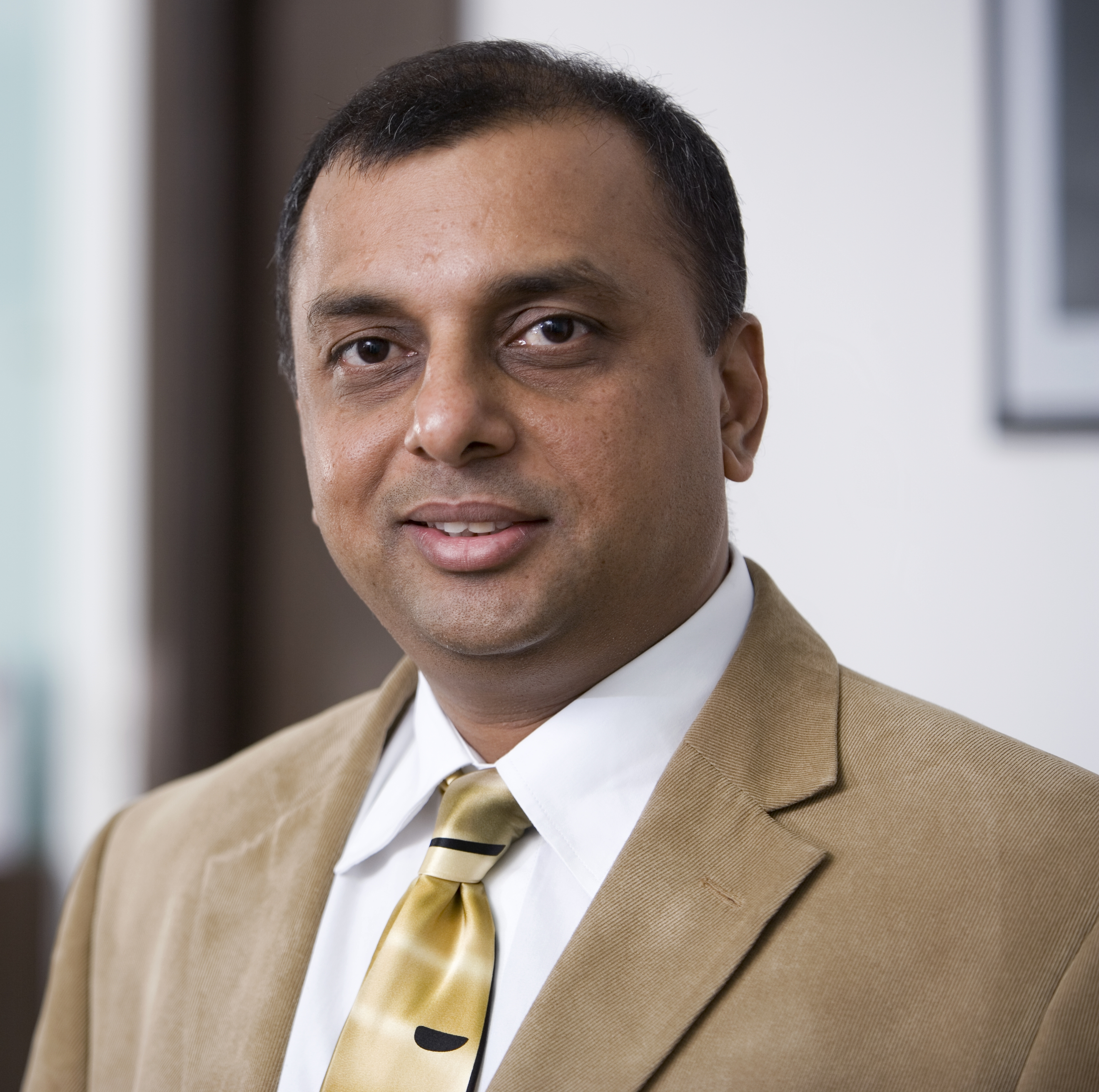
Sharan Patil

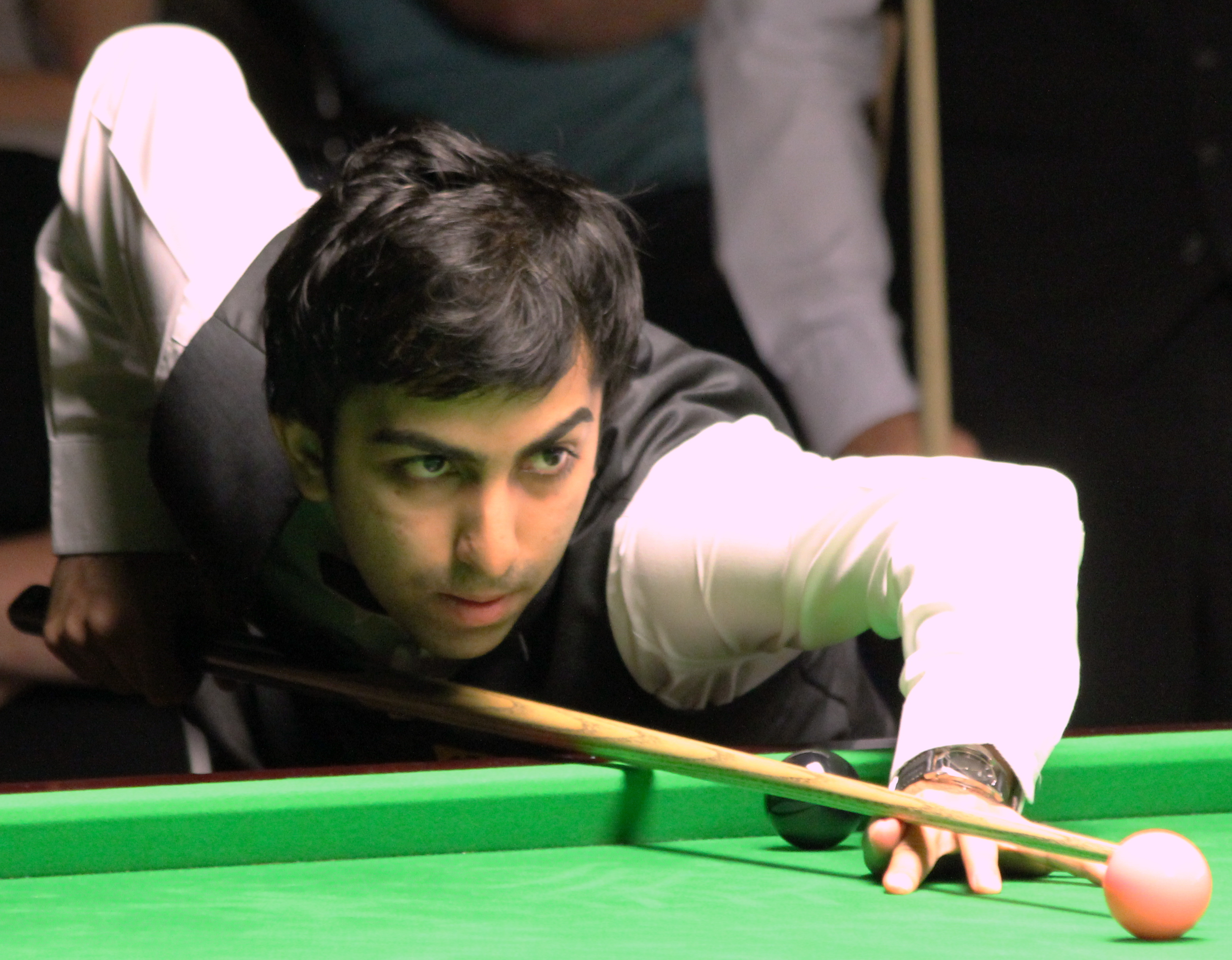
Pankaj Advani

Recipient	Field
Sumitra Gandhi Kulkarni	Literature
C. N. Ramachandran	Literature
Chi. Srinivasaraju	Literature
Ma. Na. Javaraiah	Literature
G. N. Chakravarthy	Literature
Laadsaheb Amingadh	Theatre
Sarojamma P. Dhuttaragi	Theatre
Sheshappa Gabbur	Music
Basappa H. Bhajantri	Music
Gourang Kodikal	Dance
Master Vittal Shetty	Dance
Geetha Daathar	Folklore
Savanthramma Sabanna Sunnagar	Folklore
Honnamma	Folklore
Syed Saab Ladkhan	Folklore
Maachaar Gopal Naika	Folklore
Seenappa Bhandari	Yakshagana
M. R. Balekaayi	Fine Arts
S. Shankaranarayanacharya	Sculpture
Parvathamma Rajkumar	Cinema
Anant Nag	Cinema
Suresh Urs	Cinema
T. J. S. George	Journalism
Sarajoo Katkar	Journalism
Ponnappa	Journalism
Abdul Khalik	Journalism
Ghaini Lalsingh Jaamkar	Medicine
H. K. Nagaraj	Medicine
Sharan Patil	Medicine
K. V. Devadiga	Medicine
Rajan Deshpande	Medicine
Channabasappa Halahalli	Education
B. N. Brahmacharya	Education
K. Balaveera Reddy	Education
Nagesh Hegde	Environment
Bharamagowda	Agriculture
G. T. Narayana Rao	Science
P. K. Shetty	Science
H. Y. Rajagopal	Overseas Kannadiga
Shekhar Babu Shetty	Overseas Kannadiga
Pankaj Advani	Sports
B. C. Suresh	Sports
G. Shankar Family Trust	Social Work
Y. M. S. Sharma	Social Work
M. G. Bopaiah	Social Work
T. V. Narayana Shastry	Social Work
Moolchand Nahar	Social Work
A. Sundar	Research
D. N. Shankara Bhat	Research
K. T. Pandurangi	Research
Srinivas Ritthi	Research
