= Ambalapady Mahakali Temple =

Temple to Krishna in Udupi City, Karnataka, India

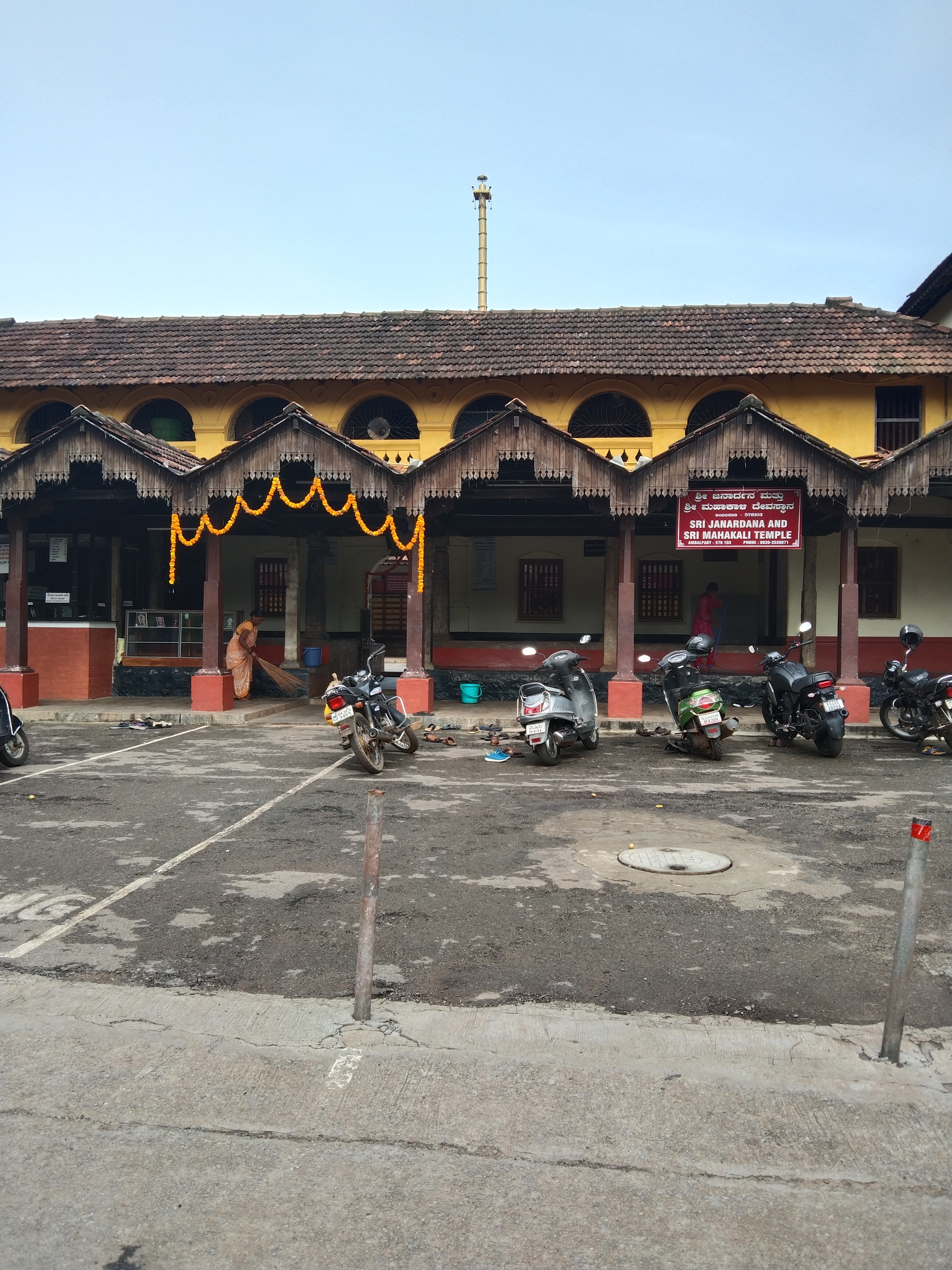
The façade

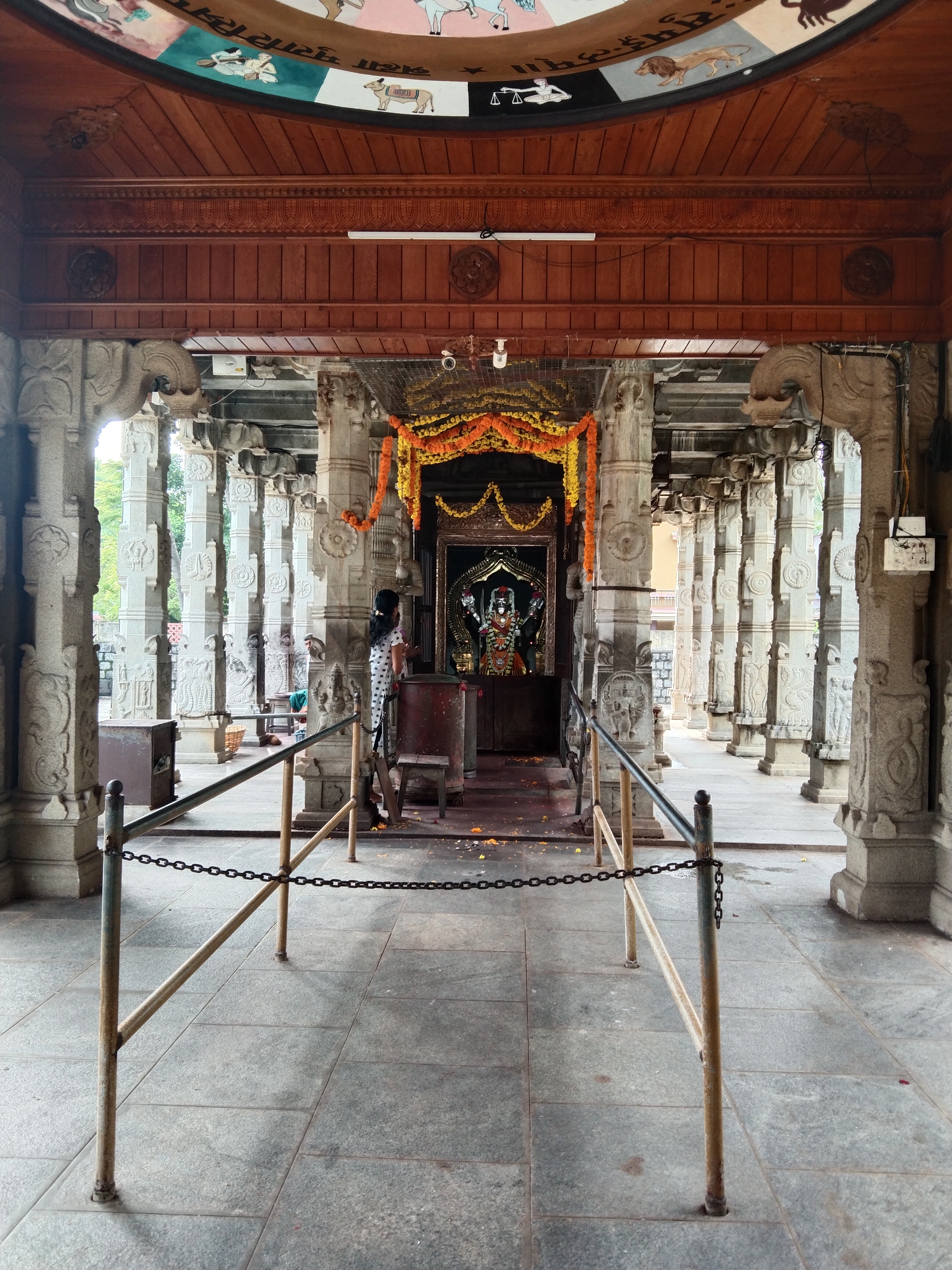
The Interior

Ambalpady Mahakali Temple is a holy place dedicated to the Hindu god Krishna in the surroundings of Udupi City, Karnataka, India. With the ancient Janardana Temple having Mahakali mandir by the side, Janardana pushkarani in the front, an Anjaneya temple with an idol incorporating incarnations of Mukhyaprana, and a Brandavan of Raghavendra Tirtha in the surroundings, it has been growing as a religious and cultural centre in the coastal belt of Karnataka State.

With the Udupi Sri Krishna temple to the east and the holy beach where Madhvacharya received the idol of Krishna to the west, Ambalpady is situated about 2 miles away from Udupi bus-stand. If Krishna is facing west, Janardana at Ambalpady is facing east. If a straight line is drawn to the west from Udupi Krishna temple, it reaches the Ambalpady Janardana temple. Janardana is the presiding deity of Ambalpady.

Ambalpady is ‘Ammana Padi’, or the ‘Woods of Amma’. It is believed that initially goddess Mahakali was worshipped in a stone. The same stone is being worshiped even now along with the wooden idol of Mahakali.
