= K. T. Pandurangi =

Indian scholar (1918–2017)

Mahamahopadhyaya Krishnacharya Tamanacharya Pandurangi
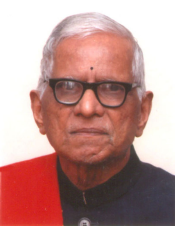
- Born: December 1, 1918; Dharwad, Karnataka
- Died: April 22, 2017 (aged 98); Bangalore, Karnataka
- Occupations: Scholar, Professor
- Spouse: Susheela
- Children: two daughters; three sons
- Awards: 1989 : Rashtrapati Award; 2007: Rajyotsava Award

Academic background
- Education: Maharaja's College, Mysore; Banares Hindu University

Academic work
- Discipline: Sansrit language, Hindu Dvaita Philosophy and Studies
- Institutions: Bangalore University
- Main interests: Vedanta, Hindu philosophy

Krishnacharya Tamanacharya Pandurangi (1 December 1918 – 21 April 2017), also known by the pen name Viswamangala, was an Indian Sanskrit scholar and a notable Indologist. Prof.Pandurangi was unique among contemporary Sanskrit scholars, being simultaneously at home among both traditional and modern systems of education. In 1989, the Government of India honoured him with the Rashtrapati Award for his contributions to literature and research.

Krishnacharya's students included such renowned Sanskrit scholars as D. Prahladachar, former Vice Chancellor, Rashtriya Sanskrit Vidyapeetha, Tirupati; V. R. Panchamukhi, Indian Economist; Vyasanakere Prabhanjanacharya.

== Biography ==
Krishnacharya was born on 1 December 1918 in a family of Sanskrit scholars to Tamanacharya Pandurangi and Lakshmi Bai in Dharwad, Karnataka. He studied up to 7th standard in the local school and then studied Sanskrit in the Sankaracharya Patasala at Dharwad. His further higher education was in Patasalas as well; from Dharwad to Sangli Patasala; from Sangli to Mysore Patasala and so on. In 1936 at the age of 18 he moved to Mysore. Within four years he had completed the study of Nyaya and Vedanta there. At Patasala, he learnt Nyaya Shastra under Dharapuram Krishnamurthi Acharya. At other times he went to the residence of the same Acharya and learnt Vedanta at home. He practised this kind of double-study under other scholars, including Kasipranesa Acharya, Chaturvedi Ramachandracharya, Doddaballapur Vasudevacharya, Nerur Krishnacharya, Ardikoppam Subramanya Shastry, Channa Kesava Shastry and others. In 1940, at the age of 22, he joined the Oriental department of Annamalai University and Maharaja's College, Mysore, where he studied Purva Mimamsa under such reputed scholars as Dr. B. N. K. Sharma. He also holds Bachelor of Arts and Master of Arts degrees from Banares Hindu University.

== Career ==
Prof. Pandurangi served as professor in Karnatak College, Dharwar for twelve years and in Government College, Bangalore for six years. Later he joined as head of the postgraduate Sanskrit department at Bangalore University.

He was a member of the Rashtriya Sanskrit Sansthan and the Central Sanskrit Board. He was a Senior Fellow of the Indian Council of Philosophical Research and served as President of the Mythic Society, Bangalore for twelve years. He served as Kulapati of Poornaprajna Vidyapeetha and also served as honorary director of the Dvaita Vedanta Foundation at Bangalore. Pandurangi visited Germany, England, Austria and the United States, delivering lectures on Purva Mimamsa and Vedanta. He also guided many foreign scholars who had come to India in subjects like Prakarana Panchika, Ramayana, Uttara Ramacharita, Panchapadika, Anu Vyakhyana, Pāṇini's Aṣṭādhyāyī, Vishnu Tatva Nirnaya, Karma Nirnaya and other topics of Dvaita Vedanta.

== Academic accomplishments ==
Prof. Pandurangi was highly regarded as a scholar. He studied Nyaya, Vedanta and Mīmāṃsā, erning degrees in both philosophy and literature.

He also had extensive knowledge of orthodox Hindu rituals and Vedanta. His scholarship in various darśanas of orthodox Indian philosophy earned him titles such as Vedanta Vidwan, Mimamsa Siromani, Darsanaratna and Mimamsa Bhushana.

For 35 years, he taught Sanskrit and Indian philosophy at the graduate and postgraduate level, retiring in the year 1979. He delivered lectures on Philosophy & Sanskrit at universities, at The Indian Institute of World Culture, and at Gokhale Institute. After retirement, he guided research students, including students from the United Kingdom, Germany, Japan, and the United States, for Ph.D, M.Phil and Vidya Varidhi degrees, also serving as Examiner for more than a dozen Ph.D theses submitted in various universities in India. For 20 years (1980 to 2000) he had short-term assignments in five academic centres: Bangalore University (4 years), Rashtriya Sanskrit Sansthan, Delhi (4 years), Indian Council of Philosophical Research (3 years), Gandhi Centre for Science and Human values, Bharatiya Vidya Bhavan, Bangalore (4 years), Project of History of Indian Science, Philosophy and Culture (for 5 years).

Prof. Pandurangi organised 12 conferences and seminars, and served as the Kulapati, Poorna Prajna Vidyapeeeta, Bangalore.

== Works ==
The Dvaita Vedanta Studies and Research Foundation has published many invaluable books by Pandurangi, some of which extend to several volumes. He published and edited rare works on Vedanta and Poorva - Meemamsa, translating some of them into English and Kannada. Some of the notable works are listed here:

=== Commentaries ===
- Bhatta Sangraha Raghavendra Tirtha (in 3 vols.)
- Ṛgbhāṣyam of Sri Madhvacharya ( 2 volumes).
- Nyayamrta and Advaita Siddhi (in 3 volumes).
- Tātparya Chandrika of Vyasatirtha (3 vols.)
- Brahmāsūtrabhāṣya with 8 commentaries (in 7 vols.)
- Nyāya Sudhā with 5 commentaries (in 12 vols.)
- Bhāgavata with 2 commentaries (in 12 vols.)
- Tarka Tāṇḍava of Vyasatirtha
- Pramana Paddhati of Jayatirtha

=== Translations ===
- Principal Upanishads (Ten Upanishads in 2 vols.) - (English)
- Viṣṇutattvavinirṇaya of Jayatirtha - (English)
- Viṣṇutattvavinirṇaya of Jayatirtha - (Kannada)
- Anu Bhāṣya of Madhvacharya - (Kannada)
- Tattva Manjari of Raghavendra Tirtha - (Kannada).
- Gītā Tātparya Nirnaya of Madhvacharya -(Kannada).

=== Independent works ===
==== Sanskrit ====
- Nabhovaniroopakaani - a collection of four radio plays
- Kaavyaanjalihi - an anthology of poems
- Raveendraroopakaani - an adaptation of Ravindranath Tagore’s four plays
- Purandaravachanaani - an adaptation of Purandara Dasa’s one hundred sayings
- Sarvajnavachanaani.

==== Kannada ====
- Kaavyashaastra Vinoda - Critical essays on the works of poets Kalidasa, Bhavabhuti, Kshemishvara etc.
- Sanskrita Kavayatriyaru - an introduction of thirty two poetesses of Sanskrit
- Kalidaasana Soundaryadrishti

== Awards and honours ==
- In 1989, he was honoured with Rashtrapati Award by the Government of India
- In 1997, he was honoured with the title of “Mahamahopadhyaya” by the Rashtriya Sanskrit Vidyapeetha
- In 2007, he was awarded Rajyotsava Award by the Government of Karnataka
- In 2015, he was honoured with Vyasajyothi Award
