= K. Jagannatha Shetty =

Former Judge of Supreme Court of India (1987-1991)

Hon'ble Justice K. Jagannatha Shetty

Judge of Supreme Court of India
- In office 1 May 1987 – 14 December 1991
- Nominated by: R. S. Pathak
- Appointed by: Zail Singh

27th Chief Justice of Allahabad High Court
- In office 1 October 1986 – 1 May 1987
- Nominated by: P. N. Bhagwati
- Appointed by: Zail Singh
- Preceded by: Hridai Narain Seth; N. D. Ojha (acting)
- Succeeded by: Dwarka Nath Jha

Judge of Karnataka High Court
- In office 25 June 1970 – 30 September 1986
- Nominated by: M. Hidayatullah
- Appointed by: V. V. Giri
- Acting Chief Justice
- In office 24 October 1985 – 17 August 1986
- Appointed by: Zail Singh
- Preceded by: V. S. Malimath
- Succeeded by: Prem Chand Jain

Personal details
- Born: 15 December 1926 Ambalpadi, Madras Presidency, British India (now in Udupi, Karnataka, India)
- Died: 7 April 2015 (aged 88) Bangalore, India
- Education: Osmania University (LL.B)

Kalmanje Jagannatha Shetty (15 December 1926 – 7 April 2015) was an Indian jurist who served as a judge of the Supreme Court of India and Chief Justice of the Allahabad High Court. He also served as judge and acting chief justice of the Karnataka High Court. He was also the first Chairman of the National Pay Commission.

== Early life and education ==
Shetty was born on 15 December 1926 in Ambalapady, in Udupi taluk of the then South Canara district, Karnataka. He received his early education in Udupi and graduated from St. Aloysius College, Mangalore, in 1951. He subsequently studied law at Osmania University, Hyderabad, and obtained a Master’s degree in Law. Shetty enrolled as a vakil on 14 July 1954 and as an advocate of the High Court of Judicature at Hyderabad on 16 August 1955. He practised in Hyderabad until 1956, after which he shifted his professional base to the Karnataka High Court in Bangalore following the reorganisation of states. He developed extensive experience in several branches of law, particularly civil, service and constitutional matters. Alongside his legal practice, he served as a part-time professor at Government Law College, Bangalore, for approximately ten years and taught postgraduate students. He also served two terms as a member of the Mysore State Bar Council.

== Career ==
On 25 June 1970, Shetty was appointed a judge of the Karnataka High Court alongside E. S. Venkataramiah, who later became Chief Justice of India. Shetty subsequently served as its Acting Chief Justice from 24 October 1985 to 27 August 1986. On 1 October 1986, he was appointed Chief Justice of the Allahabad High Court. He was elevated to the Supreme Court of India on 1 May 1987. He served on the Supreme Court until his retirement on 14 December 1991.

After his retirement, Shetty continued to contribute to the development of India's judicial system. In 1996, he was appointed Chairman of the First National Judicial Pay Commission, popularly known as the Justice Shetty Commission. The Commission examined the pay structure and service conditions of judicial officers in the subordinate judiciary across India and submitted its report in November 1999. Its recommendations subsequently became an important reference point in judicial service reforms.

== Death ==
Shetty passed away in Bengaluru on 7 April 2015. He was survived by his wife and two daughters.
