= Subramanya Matha =

Subramanya Matha or Sri Samputa Narasimha Matha is a Matha (monastery) of the Shivalli Madhva tradition based in Kukke Subramanya in Dakshina Kannada, Karnataka, India. It has several branches, including one at Mumbai. The Subramanya Matha at Kukke offers services which have caused friction with the nearby Kukke Subramanya Temple. As of 2025 the Subramanya Matha is headed by Vidyaprasanna Tirtha.
