= A. V. Baliga =

Indian medical doctor

A.V. Baliga
- Born: 26 April 1904; Kallianpur, Madras Presidency; British India
- Died: 1964; Kallianpur, Mysore; India
- Occupation: physician

A. V. Baliga FRCS (1904–1964) was an Indian physician, educational reformer, and a Fellow of the Royal College of Surgeons. Several institutions in India are named after him, including the Dr. A. V. Baliga College in Kumta and the Dr. A. V. Baliga Memorial Trust, a non-profit in New Delhi that seeks to improve educational equality and women's welfare. In 1995, the otolaryngology department at the Kasturba Medical College named a post-doctoral clinical fellowship in head & neck cancer after Baliga.

Pandit Jawaharlal Nehru, the first Prime Minister of India, spoke highly of Baliga following his death saying,"...He was not only a brilliant surgeon but also a good man devoted to good causes, for which he subscribed liberally...His sudden death has deprived India of an outstanding surgeon, a man and a patriot of great merit and accomplishment..."

== Early childhood and education ==
Baliga was born on 26 April 1904 in Kallianpur, where he received a primary education in the local Hindu elementary school. With Kallianpur lacking a high school, he then attended the Christian High School in Udupi. Joining the growing movement to boycott British educational institutions, Baliga left the school and was not readmitted. He later completed his secondary education at the National School in Udupi, a Nationalist institute affiliated with the Gujarat Vidyapith. His matriculation was not recognized by the British authorities, preventing his admission to MBBS programs. He instead attained a degree in Licentiate in Medicine and Surgery at the National Medical College, Bombay, self-financing his education via private tutoring. Graduating with top examination scores, he caught the attention of G. V. Deshmukh of KEM Hospital who appointed him as a house surgeon and physician.

== Career ==
=== Medicine ===
Baliga went to the U.K. on a fellowship. He had to pass the London matriculation for his LRCP, MRCS and FRCS. Baliga returned to India in 1933 and was appointed as an assistant honorary surgeon at the KEM Hospital, Bombay; there, he also worked as a house physician, anesthesiologist, and casualty officer. He also started his own private practice. From then on until his death in 1964, he rose in stature as a surgeon both nationally and internationally. A founding member of the Association of Surgeons of India, he participated in the discussions at annual association conferences.

=== Philanthropy ===
Baliga provided a large financial contribution toward the establishment of the Kanara College of Arts and Sciences in Kumta (later renamed as Dr. A. V. Baliga College, Kumta), also contributing toward the establishments of the Mahatma Gandhi Memorial College in Udupi, the Kasturba Medical College, Manipal and the orthopedic children's hospital in Haji Ali, Bombay.

=== Politics ===
Following Partition, Baliga became involved in the Goan independence movement. He also played a significant role in establishing India's political relations with the former Soviet Union. After the Sino-Soviet split, he also embarked on an unofficial diplomatic mission to China.

Desiring a free press and seeking to express his political and social views, he established a daily publication, "PATRIOT", and "LINK", a magazine.
