= Ambalpadi =

- town
- Location in Karnataka, India
- Coordinates: 13.3°N 74.7°E
- Country: India
- State: Karnataka
- District: Udupi

Languages
  - Official: Kannada
- Time zone: UTC+5:30 (IST)
- PIN: 576103

Ambalpady/Ambalpadi is a holy place which is part of Udupi town, the land of Lord Sri Krishna. With the ancient Sri Janardana temple with Mahakali Temple on one side, Janardana pushkarani in the front, an Anjaneya temple with an idol incorporating incarnations of Mukhyaprana, and a Brindavan of Raghavendra Swamji in the surroundings, it is growing as a religious and cultural center in the coastal belt of Karnataka.

== Location ==
With the Sri Krishna temple to the east and the holy beach where Sri Madhwacharya got the idol of Lord Krishna to the west, Ambalpady is situated about 3 kilometers away from Udupi bus-stand. If Lord Krishna is facing west, Lord Janardana at Ambalpady is facing east. If a straight line is drawn to the west from Udupi Krishna temple, it reaches the Ambalpady Janardana temple.

== Religious significance ==
Janardana is the presiding deity of Ambalpady. To his Southeast is goddess Mahakali who is worshiped with greater ardor. This is common as children go more often to their mother than to their father and confess their mother knowing for help. With the same belief, devotees come to goddess Mahakali to be relieved of their sins and get solution to their problems. There is one more reason for her dominance here. She had come earlier to this place to protect the land, and the place got its name because of her. Ambalpady is ‘Ammana Padi’, or the ‘Woods of Amma’. Later it became Ambalpady. It is believed that initially goddess Mahakali was worshiped in a stone. The same stone is being worshiped even now along with the wooden idol of Mahakali. Thus, Mahakali was worshiped earlier in this region and Janardana Swamy came here in search of the goddess and decided to stay here and protect devotees.

== Notable residents ==
AICC General Secretary Oscar Fernandes was from Ambalpady.

Bannanje Govindacharya was resident of Ambalpady.

Kalmanje Jagannatha Shetty was a former judge of Supreme Court of India and retired Chief Justice of the Allahabad High Court.
