= Prameya shloka =

The prameya śloka is a shloka composed by Vyasatirtha, a leading philosopher in the Dvaita school of Vedanta. The shloka summarises the nine basic tenets of Dvaita or Tattvavada, which is a school of philosophy founded by Sri Madhvacharya.

A correct understanding of this shloka is equivalent to obtaining a firm grasp of the fundamental principles of Tattvavada.

== The Prameya Śloka ==
The śloka in the Kannada script is:

ಶ್ರೀಮನ್ಮಧ್ವಮತೇ ಹರಿಃ ಪರತರಃ ಸತ್ಯಂ ಜಗತ್ತತ್ವತೋ

ಭೇದೋ ಜೀವಗಣಾ ಹರೇರನುಚರಾ ನೀಚೋಚ್ಚಭಾವಂ ಗತಾಃ |

ಮುಕ್ತಿರ್ನೈಜ ಸುಖಾನುಭೂತಿರಮಲ ಭಕ್ತಿಶ್ಚ ತತ್ಸಾಧನಂ

ಹ್ಯಕ್ಷಾದಿತ್ರಿತಯಂ ಪ್ರಮಾಣಮಖಿಲಾಮ್ನಾಯೈಕವೇದ್ಯೋ ಹರಿಃ ||

In Devanagari:

श्रीमन्मध्वमते हरिः परतरः सत्यं जगत्तत्त्वतो

भेदो जीवगणा हरेरनुचराः नीचोच्चभावं गताः।

मुक्तिर्नैजसुखानुभूतिरमला भक्तिश्च तत्साधनम्

ह्यक्षादित्रितयं प्रमाणमखिलाम्नायैकवेद्यो हरिः ॥

In English:

1. hariḥ parataraḥ (Hari [Viṣṇu] is supreme)
2. satyaṃ jagat (the world is true)
3. tattvato bhedaḥ (the difference is real)
4. jīvagaṇāḥ hareranucarāḥ (the soul-classes are servants of Hari)
5. nīcocca bhāvaṃgatāḥ (…and will achieve lower or higher states)
6. muktirnaijasukhānubhūtiḥ (liberation is one’s own experience of joy)
7. amalā bhaktiśca tatsādhanam (…and pure devotion is its means of accomplishment)
8. hyakṣāditrityaṃ pramāṇam (the triad beginning with perception is the authority)
9. akhilāmnāyaikavedyo hariḥ (the one object of knowledge of the entire scriptural canon is Hari)
