= Shiva Stuti =

Hindu devotional hymn dedicated to Shiva

Information
- Religion: Hinduism
- Author: Narayana Panditacharya
- Language: Sanskrit
- Period: 13th century
- Verses: 13
- Shiva Stuti at Sanskrit Wikisource

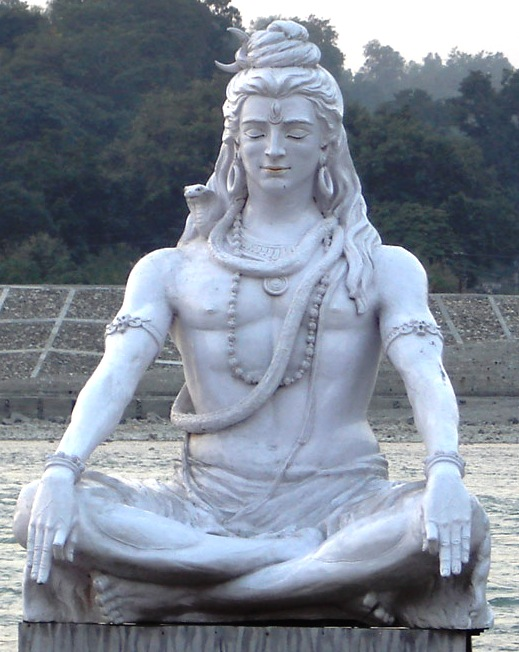
Statue of a meditating Shiva, Rishikesh

The Shiva Stuti (Sanskrit: शिवस्तुतिः, romanized: Śivastutī), is a stuti (hymn) composed by Narayana Panditacharya in praise of the deity Shiva written in the Prithvi metre. Stuti means eulogy, singing praise, panegyric and to praise the virtues, deeds, and nature of God.

== Description ==
The Shiva Stuti consists of 13 verses and is recited daily or on special festivals like Maha Shivaratri by Hindus. According to legend, Narayana Panditacharya is believed to have travelled to the Rameshwaram Temple, when the doors were closed. After chanting this hymn, the doors are believed to have opened of their own will, and the author is said to have received a darshana (auspicious vision) of Shiva.

The authorship of the Shiva Stuti is attributed to Narayana Panditacharya, a poet-saint who lived in the 14th century CE. He mentions his name in the last verse of the hymn. It is said in the 13th verse of the Shiva Stuti that whoever chants it with full devotion to Shiva would receive have the deity's grace. Among Hindus worldwide, it is a very popular belief that chanting the Shiva Stuti invokes Shiva's divine intervention in grave problems.

=== Author ===
Narayana Panditacharya (1290–1370) was a Hindu poet-saint, reformer and philosopher. A composer of several popular works, he is best known for being the author of the epic Sri Madhva Vijaya, a biographical work of the Dvaita philosopher Madhvacharya in the Sanskrit language.

== Commentaries ==
- Chalari Narasimhacharya wrote a commentary on Shiva Stuti.

== See also ==
- Sri Stuti
- Lakshmi Stuti
- Mahishasura Mardini Stotra

== Bibliography ==
- Sharma, B. N. Krishnamurti (2000). A History of the Dvaita School of Vedānta and Its Literature, Vol 1. 3rd Edition. Motilal Banarsidass (2008 Reprint). ISBN 978-8120815759.
- Glasenapp, Helmuth Von (1992). Madhva's Philosophy of the Viṣṇu Faith. Dvaita Vedanta Studies and Research Foundation.
- Sivaramamurti, C. (1976), Śatarudrīya: Vibhūti of Śiva's Iconography, Abhinav Publications
- Emeneau, Murray Barnson (1967), American Oriental Series, Volume 7, American oriental society
- Arapura, J.G. (2012), Gnosis and the Question of Thought in Vedānta: Dialogue with the Foundations, Springer, ISBN 978-9400943391
