= Dvadasha Stotra =

Hindu hymn

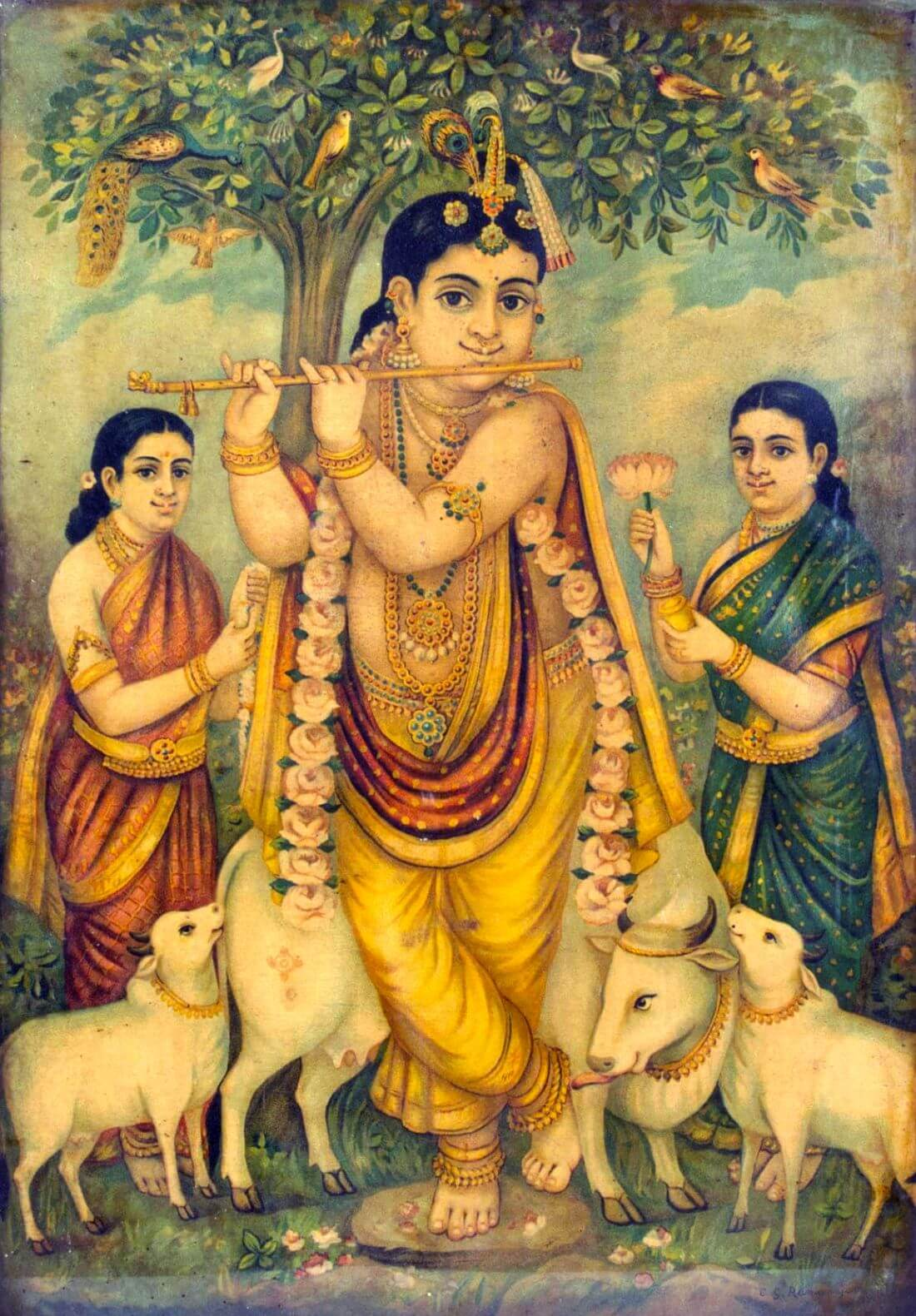
- Painting of Krishna with consorts Rukmini and Satyabhama, Ravi Varma Press

Information
- Religion: Hinduism
- Author: Madhvacharya
- Language: Sanskrit
- Period: 13th century
- Verses: 12

The Dvadasha Stotra (Sanskrit: द्वादशस्तोत्रम्, romanized: Dvādaśastotraṃ) is a series of 12 stotras, or religious hymns, composed by Madhvacharya, the 13th-century founder of the Dvaita school of Indian philosophy. Dvadaśa in Sanskrit means "twelve", and all the 12 stotras are in praise of the Hindu god Vishnu. The third stotra is considered a summary of Madhvacharya's philosophy.

It is believed that the stotras were composed in connection with the installation of the idol of the Hindu god Krishna at Udupi.

There have been numerous musical compositions of the Dvadasha Stotra over the years. It is also a ritual to recite the Dvadasha Stotra at the time of naivedya or the offering of food to God performed at Madhva temples.

== Hymn ==
The first verse of the stotra is as follows:

vande vandyam sadanandam
vasudevam niranjanam
indirdpatimadyadi
varadesavarapradam
I reverentially salute Vasudeva the adorable, of the nature of impeccable bliss, immaculate, the Lord of Indra and the bestower of boons on boon-giving lords such as Brahma and others.

— Verse 1

== Commentaries and translations ==
There are eight known commentaries on the Dvadasha Stotra, authored by:

- Gangodamishra
- Gudhakartrika
- Chalari Narasimhacharya
- Channapattana Thimmannacharya
- Umarji Tirumalacharya
- C M Padmanabhacharya
- Punyashravana Bhikshu
- Sri Vishwapati Tîrtha

== See also ==
- Prameya shloka
- Rukminisha Vijaya
- Yadavabhyudaya
