= Narayana Panditacharya =

Hindu philosopher, saint and poet

Personal life
- Born: Narayana Panditacharya; 1290 Present day Coastal Karnataka
- Died: 1370 (aged 79–80) Present day Kerala
- Parent: Trivikrama Panditacharya (father)
- Notable work(s): Sumadhva Vijaya and Shiva Stuti

Religious life
- Religion: Hinduism
- Philosophy: Dvaita Vedanta

Sri Narayana Panditacharya (also referred as Narayana Pandita) (IAST: Nārāyaṇa Paṇḍitacārya) (c. 1290 – c. 1370), is an Indian scholar and philosopher in the Dvaita Vedānta tradition. He was the youngest son of Trivikrama Panditacharya, one of the direct disciples of Sri Madhva He is the author of Sri Madhva Vijaya, a metrical biography of the rejuvenator of the Dvaita school of philosophy, Sri Madhvacharya. Indologist B. N. K. Sharma writes, "Narayana has earned a lasting fame for himself by his great metrical biography of Madhva".

== Works ==
Narayana Panditacharya is credited with more than 20 literary works:

- Sri Madhva Vijaya, a biography on the life of Sri Madhvacharya
- Sangraha Ramayana
- Tattva Manjari, a commentary on Sri Vishnutatvavinirnaya, the best of Dasha Prakaranas by Sri Madhvacharya
- Pramanalakshana Tippani
- Nayacandrika
- Bhavadipa
- Yamakabharata Tippani, a commentary on Yamakabharata
- Krishnamritamaharnava Tippani, a commentary on Krishnamritamaharnava
- Anu Madhva Vijaya
- Madhva Vijaya Bhavaprakasika
- Manimanjari
- Narasimha Stuti (in 39 verses)
- Subhodaya
- Parijataharanam
- Yoga dipika
- Shiva Stuti
- Anu Vayustuti
- Laghutaratamya Stotra
- Tithitraya Nirnaya
- Amsamsinirnaya
- Madhwamrutha Maharnava

=== Sri Madhva Vijaya ===
His epic work Madhwavijaya consists of 16 sargas or cantos, and gives extensive insights into the life and philosophy of Madhvacharya. It is the only authentic work available on Sri Madhva, as Narayana Panditacharya was a contemporary of Sri Madhva. He has also written his own commentary on Sumadhvavijaya, in which he explains the real names of the Sanskritised Kannada and Tulu names of persons and places in Sumadhvavijaya. This is called "Bhavaprakashika". Without this commentary it would be difficult to understand the poem itself.

=== Sangraha Ramayana ===
Sangraha Ramayana is a condensed form of Valmiki Ramayana, with more than 3,000 slokas, written in accordance with the Sri Rama's story as told by Sri Madhvacharya in his "Sriman Mahabharata Tatparya Nirnaya". Sangraha Ramayana was printed in 1890 AD, has been reprinted (in November 2008) with Kannada translation by Dr. Vyasanakere Prabhanjanacharya. "Prameya Nava Malika" also known as "Anu Madhva Vijaya" is a condensed form of Sri Madhvacharya's Biography told in just 32 Slokas. Sri Raghavendra Swami has written a commentary on it in his Purvashrma days.

=== Other notable works ===
Manimanjari and Shubodaya are his other kavyas. Manimanjari gives account of the history of Vaishnava Acharyas before the advent of Sri Madhvacharya. It has eight cantos or sargas written in simple Sanskrit poetry. It is, in fact, one of the first Sanskrit poems taught in the traditional Madhwa learning circles. In the first two sargas Ramavatara story is narrated briefly, Third and Fourth sargas deal with the Krishnavatara story. The last four sargas deal with the history of Vaishnava Acharyas prior to Sri Madhvacarya and the eighth sarga ends with the advent of Sri Madhvacarya. SriMadhwaVijaya is a continuation of this. There are about half a dozen Sanskrit commentaries on this and a couple of them are in print. Shubodaya is an adhyatma kavya where the poet experiments with different meters.

== Personal life ==
Narayana Pandita's home is still there in Karsargod district of Kerala and is called "Kavu Mutt". His descendants still live there. The icon of Srivasta Narayana handed over by Sri Madhvacharya to Sri Trivikrama Panditacharya is still worshipped there. There also is a vrindavana there, where he was entombed. This also gives rise to a doubt that he might have been ordained as a sanyasi in his old age.

== See also ==
- Works of Madhvacharya
- Dvaita Literature

== Bibliography ==
- Bryant, Edwin Francis (2007), Krishna: A Sourcebook, Oxford University Press, ISBN 978-0-19-803400-1
- Siraj, S.Anees (2012), Karnataka State: Udupi District, Government of Karnataka, Karnataka Gazetteer Department
- Sharma, B. N. Krishnamurti (2000). A History of the Dvaita School of Vedānta and Its Literature, Vol 1. 3rd Edition. Motilal Banarsidass (2008 Reprint). ISBN 978-8120815759.

== Sources ==
- Sri Madhvacharya
- Introduction to Bannanje Govindacharya
