= B. N. K. Sharma =

Sanskrit writer from India

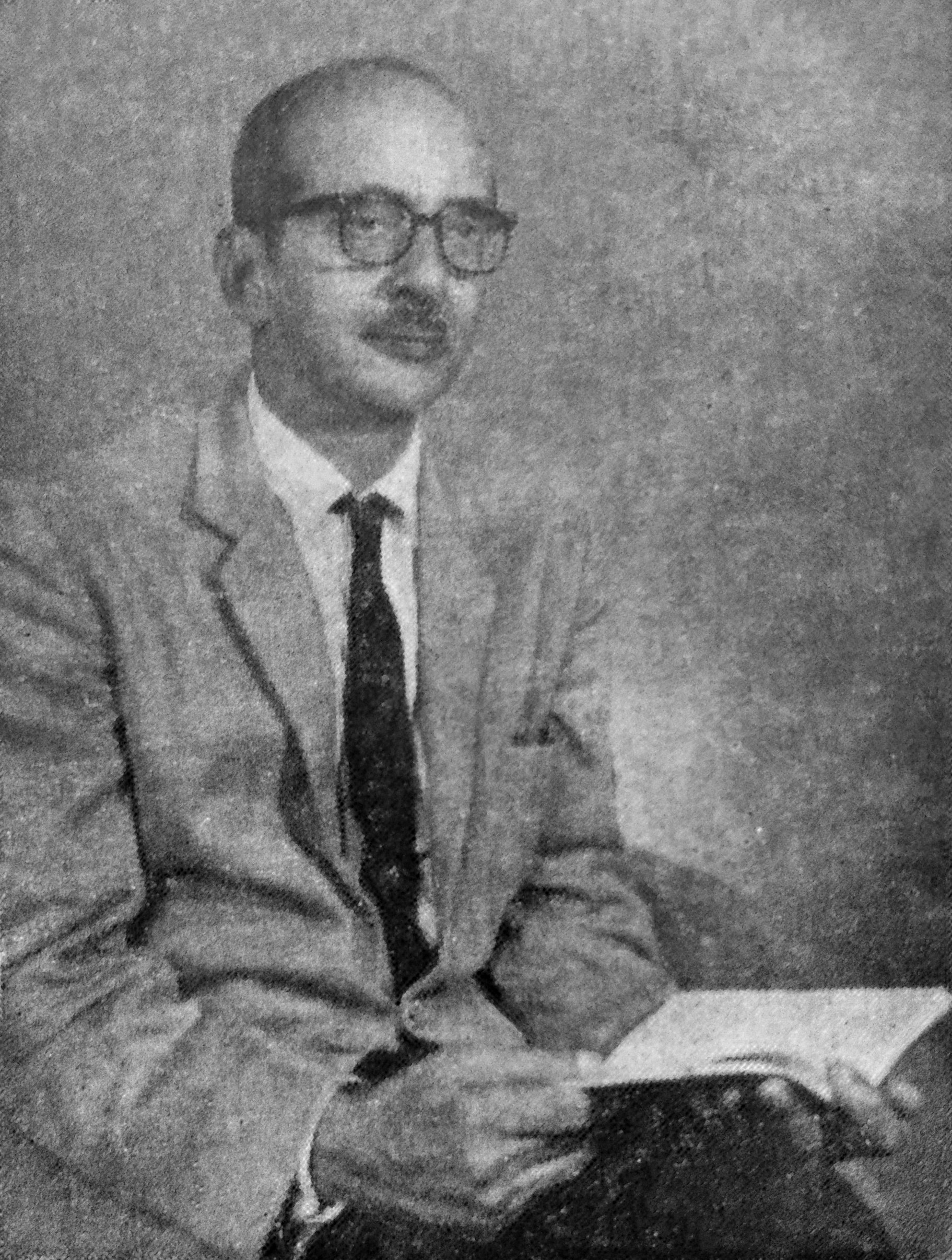
- Born: Bhavani Narayanrao Krishnamurti; 9 June 1909; Salem, British Raj
- Died: 2 July 2005 (aged 96); Mumbai, Maharashtra
- Occupations: Scholar, professor
- Awards: Sahitya Academy Award (1963)

Academic background
- Education: University of Madras; Presidency College

Academic work
- Discipline: Religious Studies
- Institutions: Ruparel College, Bombay
- Main interests: Dvaita Vedanta, Hindu philosophy

Bhavani Narayanrao Krishnamurti Sharma (9 June 1909 – 2 July 2005), commonly known as B. N. K. Sharma or B. N. Krishnamurti Sharma, was an Indian writer, scholar, professor, and Indologist. Sharma was a professor and Head of the Department of Sanskrit in Ruparel College, Bombay from (1953–1969). Sharma was one of the foremost exponents of Madhvacharya's school of Dvaita Vedanta. B. N. K. Sharma learned the art of debates and Vedanta under Satyadhyana Tirtha of Uttaradi Math. Sharma travelled along with Satyadhyana Tirtha from (1930 - 1944), learned all philosophical knowledge from him and also used to clarify his doubts from Satyadhyana Tirtha.

Born in a Brahmin family of scholars and court pandits, Sharma authored more than 25 classical works and over 150 research papers on Vedanta in general and Dvaita Vedanta in particular. He attained national renown and recognition for his scholarly contribution to the Dvaita Vedanta literary treasure. His History of Dvaita School Of Vedanta And Its Literature is a monumental work which brought him the highest national literary distinction of the Sahitya Academy Award in 1963. Sharma was also the recipient of the President of India's Award for Eminent Sanskrit Scholars in 1992 and the Government of Maharashtra's Award for Sanskrit in 1993.

Sharma is one of the eminent scholars who wrote the critical appreciations of prominent Haridasa saints such as Purandara Dasa, Kanaka Dasa and others.

== Life and career ==
=== Early life ===
B.N.K. Sharma was born at the late British Raj on 9 June 1909 in a Kannada-speaking Madhva Brahmin family in Salem, Madras Presidency, during the British Raj (present-day Tamil Nadu) in a family of Sanskrit Scholars of the former Cochin State of Kerala. He was brought up speaking in Kannada at home and Tamil outside. His mother Lakshmi Bai was a housewife and native of Salem, while his father B.S.Narayan Rao, a Sanskrit scholar was a native of Coimbatore. B. N. K. Sharma's actual name is Bhavani Narayanrao Krishnamurti and Sharma is not part of his name. Due to Brahmin origins, people started calling him "Sharma" and later it became part of his name.

=== Academic career ===
B.N.K. Sharma had his primary education at the Government School in Kumbakonam. As a child he had "sharp intellect and acumen" with a great interest in literature and philosophy. Sharma completed his Bachelor of Arts degree in Sanskrit from University of Madras in 1931 and Master of Arts degree in 1935 from Presidency College, Chennai. Sharma received his Ph.D. from University of Madras in 1948 for his thesis on the origin and development of the Dvaita School of Vedanta and its literature.

Sharma started his teaching career as a lecturer at Annamalai University at the age of 22 in 1931 until 1938. In 1938 he became principal of Government Sanskrit College in Thiruvayur until 1948. In 1948 he worked as a research scholar in Vishveshvaranand Vedic Research Institute in Punjab. In 1950, he started working as a principal at Poornaprajna Sanskrit College in Udupi. In 1952 he became Principal Dr. A. V. Baliga College, Kumta for a short time of one year. In 1953 he finally landed in Maharashtra, where he was appointed as professor and Head of the Department of Sanskrit in Ruparel College in Mumbai and retired in 1969.

== Works ==
=== Comics ===
B. N. K. Sharma also rendered script for a comic book by the name "Madhvacharya: A Vaishnava Saint-Philosopher" of Amar Chitra Katha, a comic book series for which the editor was Anant Pai and the illustrator was H. S. Chavan. It was published in 1967. It was republished many times.

=== Literary works ===
Sharma authored more than 25 classical works and over 150 research papers on Vedic history, and Vedanta. He was an expert in Dvaita Vedanta. Some of his notable works include:

- Philosophy of Śrī Madhvācārya. Motilal Banarsidass (2014 Reprint). 1962. ISBN 978-8120800687.
- History of the Dvaita School of Vedānta and Its Literature: From the Earliest Beginnings to Our Own Times, 3rd Edition. Motilal Banarsidass (2008 Reprint). 1960. ISBN 978-8120815759.
- The Brahmasūtras and Their Principal Commentaries A Critical Exposition Vol I, Vol II, Vol III. Munshiram Manoharlal Publishers (2008 Reprint). 1971. ISBN 978-8121500357.
- Madhva's Aupaniṣadam Darśanam. Dvaita Vedanta Studies and Research Foundation. 1983.
- The Bṛhadāraṇyaka Upaniṣad Expounded from Śrī Madhvācārya's Perspective. Dvaita Vedanta Studies and Research Foundation. 1988.
- Dvaita Philosophy as Expounded by Śrī Madhvācārya. University of Madras. 1961.
- Śrī Madhva's Teachings in His Own Words. Bharatiya Vidya Bhavan. 1970.
- Bhagavad Gītā Bhāṣya of Śrī Madhvācārya. Anandatirtha Prathistama, Poornaprajna Vidyapeetha. 1989.
- Lectures on Vedānta. Karnatak University. 1973.
- Nyāyasudhā of Jayatīrtha (3 Vols.). Vishwa Madhwa Maha Parishat. 2001.
- Festivals of India. Ministry of Education and Social Welfare, Government of India. 1977. ISBN 978-0836402834.
- Advaitasiddhi Vs Nyāyāmṛta: An Up To Date Critical Re-Appraisal. Akhila Bhārata Mādhva Mahamandal. 1994.

History of the Dvaita School of Vedānta and Its Literature

"Sharma is known for several definitive works on Dvaita : this one maintains his high standards of scholarship and style."

— Indologist Karl Potter

Dr. B. N. Krishnamurti Sharma is the author of "History of the Dvaita School of Vedānta and Its Literature: From the Earliest Beginnings to Our Own Times", (Motilal Banarsidass, 1962). For this research work, Dr. B. N. Krishnamurti Sharma was awarded Sahitya Akademi Award, the highest national literary award by the Government of India in 1963.

== Awards and honours ==
B. N. K. Sharma won numerous awards during the course of his literary career. His first major award was in 1963, the Sahitya Akademi Award for History of the Dvaita School of Vedānta and Its Literature. In 1968, he was awarded the honorary Doctor of Letters (D.Litt.) in Sanskrit by the Mumbai University. In 1992, he was honoured with President of India's Award for Eminent Sanskrit Scholars Award. In 1993, he was honoured with Government of Maharashtra's Award for Eminent Sanskrit Scholar. On 13 November 1999, he was honoured with the title of "Mahamahopadhyaya" by the Rashtriya Sanskrit Vidyapeetha. On 16 September 2003, he was honoured with the Motilal Banarsidass Centenary Award. On 2 May 2004, he was awarded the Maharashtra State Kannadigas' Literary Conference Award in Mumbai.

== Legacy ==
Sharma's greatest achievement was making Dvaita philosophy accessible to the outside world through his English works and literature. He is regarded as one of the leading Sanskrit and English language writers, along with K. T. Pandurangi, R.S. Panchamukhi, Surendranath Dasgupta, and K. Narain exposed and showed the importance of the Dvaita Vedanta in Indian philosophy to the Western world through their English works. Professor L. Stafford Betty says, "Dasgupta, K. Narain and B.N.K.Sharma - the three twentieth-century scholars who are perhaps most responsible for exposing the West to Vedantic Dualism (Dvaita)". Noted historian George M. Moraes says, B. N. K. Sharma along with R. D. Ranade, R. S. Panchamukhi and K. T. Pandurangi as a few of the eminent scholars who brought out the works of Purandaradasa, Kanakadasa and other saints with critical appreciation. He gave his readers something to look forward to with his Dvaita works and is considered to be one of the best scholars India has ever produced.

== Personal life ==
=== Family ===
B.N.K. Sharma married Hemalatha, who hails from the Myleripalem Jagirdar family belonging to the Deshastha Madhva Brahmin community. The couple has one son and one daughter named Sudhindra Krishnamurti Bhavani (popularly known as Dr S.K. Bhavani), who is also a scholar and author of many works and Vibha. His son S.K.Bhavani married Lakshmi and had a son named Purandar who is also a scholar. Sharma's daughter Vibha was married to Srinivasan. Sharma's grandson Purandar Bhavani married Asha.

B. N. K. Sharma's son S. K. Bhavani worked as a professor at the Department of Sanskrit in Somaiyya College, Bombay and later as the principal of the college. S.K. Bhavani wrote a commentary on Bhagavad Gita by bringing together a critical and comparative study of Gita as interpreted by Adi Shankara, Ramanuja and Madhva schools as well as by modern exponents like Bal Gangadhar Tilak and Aurobindo.

=== Views ===
B.N.K. Sharma was a follower of Dvaita Vedanta of Hinduism, and a strong believer in spirituality. B. N. K. Sharma's family belongs to Vyasaraja Math, but he is a disciple of Satyadhyana Tirtha of Uttaradi Math. Their family deity is Lord Venkateshwara of Tirupati and used to visit the temple quite often.
