= List of works by Madhvacharya =

The extant works of the Dvaita founder-philosopher, Madhvacharya, called the Sarvamūla Granthas, are many in number. The works span a wide spectrum of topics concerning Dvaita philosophy in specific and Vedic thought in general. They are commentaries on the Vedas, Upanishads, Bhagavadgita, Brahma Sutras and other works. The list of works are enumerated below.

== Commentaries on the Bhagavad Gita ==
Madhva, of the view that the Gita is as much a part of the religious canon as Upanishads or the Vedas, has authored two commentaries on it. His first work, Gita Bhashya is expositional while the latter, Gita Tatparya, is polemical in nature. According to Madhva, the Gita contains the distillation of the ideas expressed in the Upanishads and the Pancharatra, hence a vital part of the Vedanta tradition.

=== Gita Bhashya ===
This preliminary commentary on the Gita is the earliest example of Madhva's style which is characterised by its terseness and brevity. He quotes from a variety of rare sources and scriptures and is not an exhaustive commentary on the Gita as it concentrates only on a few verses. Madhva establishes the importance of Karma Yoga or the path of duty, which had been previously relegated to a footnote in Advaita. (Note: Advaita considers Karma to be contingent upon Jnana. If ultimate knowledge of the inseparability of the Brahman from the Jiva has been attained, the karma stipulations can be ignored) According to Madhva's view, the ultimate knowledge or the Aparoksha Jnana can be attained through a combination of dispassionate discharge of one's duties (Karma Yoga), acquisition of scriptural knowledge (Jnana Yoga) and the unconditional devotion to the higher entity (Bhakti Yoga). Though, according to Madhva, Bhakti represents the final and ultimate step towards transcendence, Karma and Jnana aid in "cleansing the consciousness" of the spiritual aspirant. He also takes an approach, unique to his time, that the rituals prescribed in the Vedas for rewards are not to be taken literally. He views them as mere objects of attraction for the general population that would subsequently propel them towards deeper meaning underlying the superficial performance of rituals. (Note: Madhva constantly makes it a point to claim that these views are not his own but already mentioned in the religious corpus. He substantiates his claims with quotations from the said sources.)

=== Gita Tatparya ===
This later work of his marks a stylistic transition from the previous work in that brevity and formality of his other works are replaced by poetry and elegance. To substantiate his views, he quotes from a diverse array of sources including a non-extant text called Brahmatarka, which has led to significant speculations among the scholars (both present and historical) about its authenticity and existence. Gita Tatparya amplifies the claims of the previous work as well as deals with the rival schools of thought, mainly that of Adi Sankara and Bhaskara. Madhva argues in favour of the reality of experiences (as opposed to the illusoriness of the world in Advaita) by basing the validity of a particular experience on the pramanas or "channels of knowledge acquisition". The pramanas Madhva accepts are pratyeksha (direct perception), anumana (inference) and shabda (testimony) with Sakshi (the internal witness) serving as the ultimate arbiter. Jayatirtha's Nyayadipika serves as a commentary to Gita Tatparya.

== Commentaries on the Brahmasutras ==
- ब्रह्मसूत्रभाष्यम् (Brahmasutra Bhashya)
- अनुव्याख्यानम् (Anu Vyakhyana)
- न्यायविवरणम् (Nyaya Vivarana)
- अणुभाष्यम् (Anu Bhashya)

== Commentaries on the Upanishads ==
- ईशावास्योपनिषद्भाष्यम् (Ishavasya Upanishad Bhashya)
- केनोपनिषद्भाष्यम् (Kena Upanishad Bhashya)
- कठोपनिषद्भाष्यम् (Katha Upanishad Bhashya)
- मुण्डकोपनिषद्भाष्यम् (Mundaka Upanishad Bhashya)
- षट्प्रश्नोपनिषद्भाष्यम् (Satprashna Upanishad Bhashya)
- माण्डूक्योपनिषद्भाष्यम् (Mandukya Upanishad Bhashya)
- ऐतरेयोपनिषद्भाष्यम् (Aitareya Upanishad Bhashya)
- तैत्तिरीयोपनिषद्भाष्यम् (Taittireeya Upanishad Bhashya)
- बृहदारण्यकोपनिषद्भाष्यम् (Brihadaranyaka Upanishad Bhashya)
- छान्दोग्योपनिषद्भाष्यम् (Chandogya Upanishad Bhashya)

== Work on Vedas ==
- ऋग्भाष्यम् (Rigbhashyam)

== Polemical Monographs ==
These are short works, each of which has a very specific focus.

- प्रमाणलक्षणम् (Pramānalaksanam)
- कथालक्षणम् (Katha Lakshana)
- उपाधिखण्डनम् (Upadhi Khandana)
- प्रपञ्चमिथ्यात्वानुमानखण्डनम् (Prapancha Mithyatva-anumana Khandana)
- मायावादखण्डनम् (Mayavada Khandana)
- तत्त्वसङ्ख्यानम् (Tattva Samkhyana)
- तत्त्वविवेकः (Tattva Viveka)
- तत्त्वोद्योतः (Tattvoddyota)
- विष्णुतत्त्वविनिर्णयः (Vishnu Tattva Vinirnaya)
- कर्मनिर्णयः (Karma Nirnaya)

== Works on Mahabharata ==
- महाभारततात्पर्यनिर्णयःMahabharata Tatparya Nirnaya
- भारतनिर्णयः or यमकभारतम् (Yamaka Bharata)

== Work on Puranas ==
- भागवततात्पर्यनिर्णयः (Bhagavata Tatparya Nirnaya)

== Stotras ==
- नरसिंहनखस्तुतिः (Narasimha Naka Stuti)
- द्वादशस्तोत्रम् (Dvadasha stotra)
- कन्दुकस्तुतिः (Kanduka Stuti)

== Miscellaneous works ==
- कृष्णामृतमहार्णवः (Krishnamruta Maharnava)
- सदाचारस्मृतिः (Sadachara Smruti)
- तन्त्रसारसङ्ग्रहः (Tantra Sara Sangraha)
- यतिप्रणवकल्पः (Yati Pranava Kalpa)
- जयन्तीनिर्णयः (Jayanti Nirnaya)
- न्यासपद्धतिः (Nyasapaddhati)
- तिथिनिर्णयः (Tithinirnaya)

== Bibliography ==
- Sharma, B. N. Krishnamurti (2000). A History of the Dvaita School of Vedānta and Its Literature, 3rd Edition. Motilal Banarsidass (2008 Reprint). ISBN 978-8120815759.
- Nadkarni, M.V (2016). The Bhagavad-Gita for the Modern Reader: History, interpretations and philosophy. Routledge. ISBN 9781315438986.
- Pandurangi, K.T (1998). Gita Bhashyam. Poornaprajna Samshodhana Mandira.
