= Madhva Brahmin =

Indian Hindu Brahmin communities

Madhva Brahmins
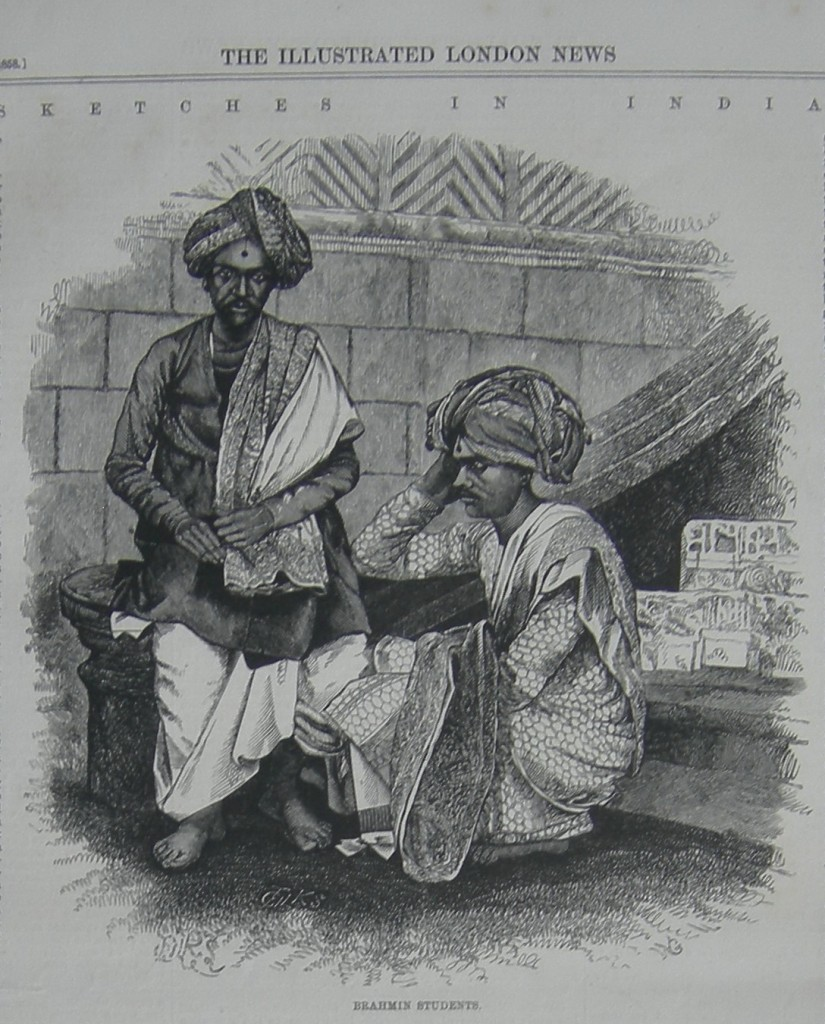
- 1858 illustration of Madhva Brahmins with religious symbols on London News

Regions with significant populations
- India (Karnataka, Bihar, Madhya Pradesh, Maharashtra, Jharkhand, Kerala, Chhattisgarh, Goa, Tamil Nadu, Telangana, Gujarat and Andhra Pradesh)

Languages
- Kannada, Konkani, Marathi, Telugu, Hindi, Tulu, Tamil, Malayalam

Religion
- Hinduism (Vaishnava)

Madhva Brahmins (also often referred as Madhvas or Sadh-Vaishnavas) are communities of Hindus from the Brahmin caste in India, who follow Sadh Vaishnavism (Sanskrit: सद्वैष्णवसम्प्रदाय) and Dvaita philosophy propounded by Madhvacharya. They are found mostly in the Indian states of Karnataka, Maharashtra, Goa, Tamil Nadu, Kerala, Telangana and Andhra Pradesh.

== History ==
The Madhwa community traces its philosophical origins to Madhvacharya, the founder of Tattvavada (Dvaita) philosophy, who lived around the 13th century. The Ashta Mathas of Udupi were established by Madhvacharya by his disciples. Other Acharyas who established mathas after Madhvacharya include Padmanabha Tirtha, Naraharitirtha, Akshobhya Tirtha, Jayatirtha, Sripadaraja, Vyasatirtha, Vadiraja Tirtha, Vijayendra Tirtha, Raghavendra Tirtha. The affiliations of the Madhwa philosophy extended in the form of temples and monasteries from Udupi in South India to Dwaraka in West India, to Gaya in East India to Badrinath in the North India.

The town of Udupi is famous for the Sri Krishna temple of the 13th century. The Madhwas believe that the human soul is saved by the grace of God and God bestows on true devotees. Devotional worship is central to the lives of madhwas.

== Demographics ==
Statewise list of Brahmin communities who have a section that follows the Dvaita Vedanta of Madhvacharya.

- Karnataka — Deshasthas, Shivallis, Koteshwara Brahmins, (Note: Whole Koteshwara Magane Brahmins are followers of Madhvacharya) Gaud Saraswats, (Note: Majority of Gaud Saraswat Brahmins are followers of Madhvacharya) Badaganadus, Karhades, Chitpavans, Aravathuvokkalu, Aravelu, Prathamasaki, Nandavarika, Nanda Vaidikas, Kannada Kamme, Uluchukamme.
- Maharashtra & Madhya Pradesh — Deshasthas, Karhades, Gaud Saraswats, Chitpavans, (Note: Mainly found in Satara, Pune, Kolhapur districts of Maharashtra and North Karnataka region of Karnataka) Savase Brahmins (Note: Sharma says Savase Brahmins are found in large numbers in the Satara, Valva, Tasgoan, Koregoan and Karad taluks of Satara district of Maharashtra and in parts of Dharwad district in Karnataka.) and Chitrakoot Madhvas.
- Tamil Nadu – Deshasthas (migrants from Karnataka and Maharashtra), Aruvaththuvakkalu (migrants from Karnataka), Badaganadus (migrants from Karnataka), Pennaththurar Brahmins, (Note: Entire Pennaththurar Brahmins are followers of Madhvacharya) Aruvela and Prathamasakis.
- Andhra Pradesh & Telangana – Golconda Vyaparis, Deshastha Madhvas and Telugu Madhvas (Telugu Brahmins who converted to Madhva faith).
- Bihar – In Bihar, the whole Gayawal Brahmins are followers of Dvaita philosophy.
- Goa – Gaud Saraswats – Bardez and Salcete regions are a stronghold of Madhwa Saraswats and are staunch devotees of Vishnu.
- Kerala — In Kerala, the Tulu Brahmins and the Gaud Saraswat Brahmins are followers Dvaita Vedanta of Madhvacharya.
- Gujarat – In Gujarat there is a section among Gujarati Brahmins who follow Madhvacharya.

== Society and culture ==
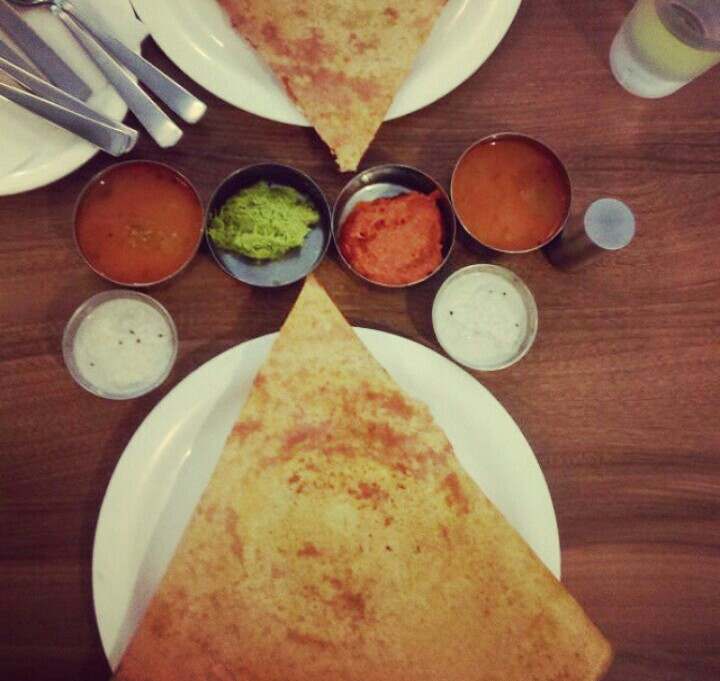
Masala dosa with Sambar and chutney in Udupi

=== Language ===
Madhwa Brahmins are not a homogeneous community. Followers of Madhvacharya include Brahmins from multiple regions and are from various linguistic backgrounds. Madhwas who speak Kannada, one of the major languages of the mainly southern Dravidian languages group, speak a variety of Kannada that borders on a literary dialect. Even in the non-Kannada states Madhwas speak Kannada in their homes but with outsiders they speak the native language of that state. The Marathi, Kannada, Telugu and Tamil speaking Madhva Brahmins are all followers of Deshastha Mathas, which are spread in Maharashtra and throughout South India. The Tulu speaking Madhva Brahmins are followers of Tuluva Mathas. They are mainly concentrated in Tulunadu region of Karnataka, in the coastal districts of Udupi, Dakshina Kannada of present-day Karnataka state, and also in Kasargod and other parts of Kerala state. The Konkani speaking Madhva Brahmins are Gaud Saraswat Madhva Brahmins, who are spread throughout the Coastal Karnataka, Goa, Maharashtra and Kerala. The Bihari, Magahi and Hindi speaking Madhva Brahmins are Gayawal Brahmins, who are spread throughout the Gaya and Benares.

=== Occupations ===
The traditional occupation of Madhwa Brahmins is priesthood, but they also engaged in occupations such as agriculture and business. At present, the majority of them work in government and private sectors.

The Tuluva Madhvas and Deshastha Madhvas are more sought after for priestly services by other communities. The Gaud Saraswat Madhvas are a religiously self-contained community. There are numerous cultural difference between these three subdivisions. In Bihar, Gayawal Brahmins are traditionally priests. They are the priests in the famous Vishnupad Temple, Gaya, who also hold a traditional monopoly over the performance of shraddha rituals on the Ghats of Gaya.

=== Diet ===
Madhwa Brahmins are pure vegetarian and their staple cereals are rice and wheat. Udupi cuisine is a synonymous name to Madhwa cuisine. It is a major vegetarian cuisine of Karnataka, which includes a combination of cereals, pulses, vegetables and spices.

Typical Madhwa cuisine consists of Saaru (Rasam), Huli (Sambar), Gojju and Anna (Rice). Gojju is generally a beloved dish to entire Madhwa community. In sweets, Hayagreeva is a very common sweet dish made in most Madhwa Brahmin homes, made using Bengal gram with jaggery and coconut.

Strict Madhva Brahmins avoid onion, garlic, red lentils (masoor), and even carrots, radish, brinjal, drumstick, and a few other vegetables and spices. They usually only eat food (prasāda) that is offered (naivedya) to one of the Vishnu deities, and fast on Vaishnava Ekadashi days (twice a month) without taking any food or water. Fruits and milk are usually allowed on Ekadashi days.

== Social and political issues ==
In 2017 the government of Karnataka introduced The Karnataka Prevention and Eradication of Inhuman Evil Practices and Black Magic Bill, 2017 in the assembly, which planned to ban all superstition practices considered black magic that promoted "social evils" and the persecution of skeptics. After much debate, Madhwa practices were exempted. In this practice, mudras usually made of gold or copper are heated in the yajna fire and stamped on the body.

== Notable people ==
- Vyasatirtha – a Dvaita saint and Rajaguru of Krishnadevaraya.
- Vadiraja Tirtha – a Dvaita philosopher, Carnatic composer and mystic. He was pontiff of Sodhe mutt.
- Purandara Dasa (1484–1564) was a Haridasa, who is widely referred to as the Pitamaha (lit, "father" or the "grandfather") of Carnatic Music.
- Raghavendra Tirtha, (Guru Rayaru) was a Hindu scholar, theologian and saint. He has authored many works related to Dwaita Vedanta and written commentary on many Indian philosophies. Raghavendra Tirtharu entered Brindavana alive in 1671 in Mantralayam, a village on the bank of river Tungabhadra.
- Pacchimiriam Adiyappa, an 18th-century famous court musician at the palace of Thanjavur Maratha kingdom.
- Dewan Purnaiah (1746–1812) – the Dewan of Mysore Kingdom under three rulers Hyder Ali, Tipu Sultan and Wadiyar. He is also founder of Yelandur estate
- Satyadharma Tirtha (1743–1830) – a scholar, saint and mystic of Dvaita order of Vedanta; 28th pontiff of Uttaradi Matha.
- K. Lakshminarayana Bhattar (1904-1985) popularly known as Bhima Bhattar, was an Indian businessman and founder of Bhima Jewellers.
- R. Ranga Rao was an Indian administrator and statesman who served as Diwan of Travancore 1837 to 1838.
- R. Venkata Rao was an Indian administrator and statesman who served as Diwan of Travancore 1821–1829 and 1838–39.
- T. Madhava Rao also known as Sir Madhava Rao Thanjavurkar or simply as Madhavarao Tanjorkar, was an Indian statesman, civil servant, administrator and politician who served as the Diwan of Travancore from 1857 to 1872, Indore from 1873 to 1875 and Baroda from 1875 to 1882.
- R. Raghunatha Rao was an Indian civil servant, administrator, politician and Indian independence activist who served as the Diwan of Indore from 1875 to 1880, and again from 1886 to 1888.
- T. Rama Rao (administrator) was an Indian administrator who served as the Diwan of Travancore (now part of Kerala State) from 1887 to 1892.
- Kanchi Krishnaswamy Rao (1845–1923) - Diwan of Travancore from 1898 to 1904.
- P. N. Krishnamurti (1849–1911) – Dewan of Mysore state and 5th Jagirdar of Yelandur estate.
- V. P. Madhava Rao (10 February 1850 – 1934) was an Indian administrator and statesman who served as the Dewan of Travancore from 1904 to 1906, then as the 17th Dewan of Mysore from 1906 to 1909, and that of Baroda from 1910 to 1913.
- T. Ananda Rao (15 May 1852 – 19 July 1919) was an Indian administrator and statesman who served as the 18th Dewan of Mysore from 1909 to 1912.
- Veene Sheshanna (1852–1926) – an exponent of the Veena, an Indian string instrument, which he played in the classical Carnatic music style. He was a concert musician at the court of the princely state of Mysore.
- Conjeevaram Hayavadana Rao (1865–1946) – an Indian historian, museologist, anthropologist, economist and polyglot. He was a member of the Royal Anthropological Institute, Indian Historical Records Commission and a fellow of the Royal Society of Economics.
- Navaratna Rama Rao (1877–1960) – an Indian writer and scholar from Karnataka.
- Aluru Venkata Rao (1880–1964) - an Indian revolutionary, historian, writer and journalist.
- Palladam Sanjiva Rao (1882–1962) - an Indian flautist and carnatic musician.
- P. B. Gajendragadkar was the 7th Chief Justice of India, serving from February 1964 to March 1966.
- V. K. R. Varadaraja Rao (1908–1991) – Indian economist, politician and educator.
- Dr. B. N. K. Sharma (1909–2005) was a Sanskrit Scholar (M.A., PhD, D.Litt) who was awarded the Sahitya Academy Award in 1963 for his book (in English) – The History of Dvaita School of Vedanta and its Literature. He also wrote a commentary on the Brahmasutras in 3 volumes. He was awarded the President's award for Sanskrit Scholars in 1992.
- T. R. Ramachandran (1917–1990) - a Tamil actor and comedian who acted in lead and supportive roles from the 1940s to the 1960s.
- Kattingeri Krishna Hebbar (1911–1996) – a celebrated artist known for his India themed artworks; Winner of Padma Shri and Padma Bhushan awards.
- Bhimsen Joshi (1922–2011) – an Indian singer from Karnataka in the Hindustani classical tradition and Bharat Ratna and Padma Shri awardee.
- Shikaripura Ranganatha Rao (1922–2013) – an Indian archaeologist who led teams credited with the discovery of a number of Harappan sites including the port city Lothal and Bet Dwarka in Gujarat.
- Vishnuvardhan (1950–2009) – an Indian film actor predominantly in Kannada cinema.
- C. K. Prahalad (1941–2010) is an Indian-American entrepreneur and author. Internationally renowned "Management Guru" and one of the world's most influential business thinkers.
- U. R. Ananthamurthy (1932–2014) – a contemporary writer and critic in the Kannada language;Winner of Jnanpith Award and Padma Bhushan.
- Udupi Ramachandra Rao (10 March 1932 – 24 July 2017) was an Indian space scientist and former chairman of the Indian Space Research Organisation. He is known as "The Satellite Man of India". He pioneered India's first satellite launch Aryabhata in 1975.
- Krishna Kumari (1933–2018) – a leading Telugu actress of the 1960s and 1980s.
- Kashinath Hathwara (1951–2018) – an Indian actor and filmmaker who primarily worked in Kannada films.
- Sakha Rama Rao – an Indian musician credited with having re-introduced the south Indian chitravina (or "gotuvadyam") to the concert scene.
- P. V. R. K. Prasad (22 August 1941 – 21 August 2017), was an Indian civil servant who served as Media Advisor to the Prime Minister of India, P. V. Narasimha Rao from 1991 to 1996. Prasad is an Indian Administrative Service (IAS) officer belonging to 1966 batch of Andhra Pradesh cadre.
- Vishwesha Tirtha (1931–2019) was an Indian Hindu guru, saint and presiding swamiji of the Sri Pejavara Adokshaja Matha, one of the Ashta Mathas belonging to the Dvaita school of philosophy founded by Sri Madhvacharya.
- B.V. Acharya (born 20 December 1933) is a senior advocate before the Karnataka High court and former Advocate General of Karnataka.
- Bannanje Govindacharya (1936–2020) was an Indian philosopher and Sanskrit scholar versed in Veda Bhashya, Upanishad Bhashya, Mahabharata, Puranas and Ramayana. Padma Shri Awardee (2009).
- N. Vittal (1938 – 2023) was an Indian civil servant who held a number of senior positions in the Government of India, most prominently that of central vigilance commissioner.
- V. S. Acharya (1940 - 2012) was an Indian politician who served as the Home Minister & Higher Education Minister in the Government of Karnataka from the Bharatiya Janata Party.
- Dwarakish (1942 – 2024) was an Indian actor, comedian, director and producer who predominantly worked in Kannada cinema in addition to few Tamil, Telugu and Hindi films.
- M. N. Venkatachaliah was the 25th Chief Justice of India. He served as Chief Justice from 1993 to 1994.
- N. R. Narayana Murthy (born 21 August 1946) is the founder of Infosys, and has been the chairman, chief executive officer (CEO), president, and chief mentor of the company.
- Prahlada Rama Rao is a defense scientist who served as former director of the Defence Research and Development Laboratory (DRDL) and as the youngest project director for the Akash (missile) systems.
- Kodaganur S. Gopinath is an Indian surgical oncologist.
- Sudha Murthy (born 19 August 1951) is an Indian educator, author
- Vidyabhushana (born 10 July 1952) is a vocalist from Karnataka. He sings devotional songs, chiefly Haridasa compositions and carnatic classical music.
- Shrinivas Kulkarni (born 4 October 1956) is a professor of astronomy and planetary science at California Institute of Technology.
- Pralhad Joshi (born 27 November 1962) is an Indian politician who is the current Union Minister of Consumer Affairs, Food and Public Distribution & New and Renewable Energy (MNRE), Govt. of India from the Bharatiya Janata Party.
- Jerry Rao is an Indian businessman and entrepreneur. He is the founder and former CEO of the software company Mphasis.
- Bhaskar Rao is an Indian politician and a retired Indian Police Service (IPS) officer who served as the Commissioner of Police for both Belagavi and Bengaluru City.
- Upendra (born 18 September 1969) is an Indian filmmaker, actor and politician known for his work in Kannada cinema.
- Sunil Joshi (born 6 June 1970) is a former Indian cricketer and an ex-member of the national selection panel of the Board of Control for Cricket in India (BCCI).
- Vijay Bharadwaj (born 15 August 1975) is a former Indian cricketer & cricket coach. He was a key architect of Karnataka's three Ranji Trophy triumphs in the 1990s.
- Abhinav Mukund is an Indian cricketer who plays domestic cricket for Tamil Nadu. He has played for India in seven Test matches.
- Mysore Vasudevachar was an Indian musician and composer of Carnatic music compositions who belonged to the direct line of Thyagaraja's disciples.

== See also ==
- Forward Castes
- Dvaita Vedanta
- Madhva Vaishnavas
- Sadh Vaishnavism

== Bibliography ==
- Sharma, B. N. Krishnamurti (2000). A History of the Dvaita School of Vedānta and Its Literature, 3rd Edition. Motilal Banarsidass (2008 Reprint). ISBN 978-8120815759.
- Hebbar, B.N (2005). The Sri-Krsna Temple at Udupi: The History and Spiritual Center of the Madhvite Sect of Hinduism. Bharatiya Granth Nikethan. ISBN 81-89211-04-8.
