= Vijayanagara musicological nonet =

The Vijayanagara musicological nonet or the Sangitashastra navaratna are a group of nine musicological treatises written during the reign of the Vijayanagara Empire. These works are counted among the most important and definitive treatises in Carnatic music theory. Each of these works contributed seminally to the growth of the Carnatic music tradition. These nine works are the Sangitasara by the sage Vidyaranya, Taladipika by Salva Gopa Tippendra, Sangitakalanidhi by Kallinatha, Bhandaru Vittaleshwara's commentary on the Sangita Ratnakara, Bhandaru Lakshminarayana's Sangitasuryodaya, Achyutadevaraya's Talakalabdhi/Talakalavriddhi and the much celebrated Swaramelakalanidhi by Ramamatya.

== Historical milieu ==
The reign of Vijayanagara Empire was a watershed period in the cultural history of South India, particularly the history of Carnatic music. The period witnessed the prolific contributions of numerous musicians, saints and theoreticians. By virtue of the geo-political influence it exerted, Vijayanagara had become the confluence of many religions, art forms and cultures. Society and culture went through a process of conflict and eclectic assimilation of the traditional and elite values on the one hand and the emerging folk and foreign influences on the other. Much of this was also the result of a reaction and revolt against emerging sociological and aesthetic trends. Even as this assimilation and nativization of the contending or opposing influences took place, traditional purity and historical continuity continued to be preserved. These cultural trends and objectives were later sustained and fostered in the several feudatory states that continued to thrive beyond the fall of the Vijayanagar Empire. Some of the notable states included Anegundi, Penukonda, Tanjore, Mysore Kingdom, Madurai, Ikkeri etc.

== Innovations in theory and practice ==
A wide range of experiments and innovations were carried out in the field of instruments too. The Tamburi introduced during the period soon became the principal drone instrument. Seminal work and innovations also took place in the Vina keyboards with regard to the accordatura, tonal range and instrumental parameters. The mela replaced the grama and it's the theoretical possibilities were fully explored through mathematical schemes of tabulation. The innovation of the concept of mela and organization of the entirety of contemporary melodic material under its umbrella culminated in Venkatamakhin's Melakarta scheme, one which continues to influence greatly the theory and practice of Carnatic music to this day. New classificatory models emerged for ragas; svayambhusvara (upper partials), paryaya-svara (alternative svara denomination) and pratinidhi-svara (representative note) scales and intervals were tuned to be brought into alignment with contemporary musical practice.

Various melodic and rhythmic structures found their way art music. All music became desi and marga music passed into oblivion as did the madhyamagrama and its paraphernalia. The totality of melody came to be referred to sadja grama alone. The arbitrary, archaic and prolific desi talas made way for the suladi talas engendered by the Haridasas. These were further refined based on the principles of the ten vital elements called taladasaprana.

== Prominent composers ==
At the height of the Vijayanagara Empire great saint-composers like Purandara Dasa, Sripadaraya, Vyasaraya, Vadirajatirtha, Kanaka Dasa, Tallapakam Annamacharya and his descendants, and Nijagunashivayogi flourished. Musical forms, the Kriti, the Suladi, the Ugabhoga, the Dandaka, the Urttanama, the Namavali, the Mundige, the Gita, the Thaya and the Prabandha developed and found wide currency during this period.

== The 'nonet' ==
Throughout the Vijayanagara period, theory and musical practice kept pace with each other closely. Great musicologists like Salva Gopa Tippendra, Kallinatha, Kumbhakarna, Ramamatya, Laksmanarayana, Pandarika Vittala, Somanatha, Locana Jha and Hrdayanarayanadeva contributed to musical theory of both North and South India during this period. Tanappacharya, Govinda Dikshita and Venkatamakhin made foundational contributions from Tanjore about a century later. Each work of these scholars records a revolutionary and seminal concept or development which cumulatively resulted in modern Carnatic music. Nine musicological treatises of great significance were composed in the Vijayanagar period and these have been called the Vijayanagara Sangitashastra Navaratna or the 'Vijayanagara Musicological Nonet'.

Sangitasara

The first of the navaratnas is Vidyaranya's Sangitasara, composed in the second half of the fourteenth century. The work dealt with, among other things, the fifteen melas and their fifty janya ragas as well as certain types of singers. Some of this even found its way into Govinda Dikshita's Sangitasudha (nidhi), authored in the early seventeenth century.

Taladipika

The second of the nonet (chronologically) is the Taladipika. Authored in the mid-fifteenth century by Salva Gopa-Tippendra, brother-in-law of king Praudha Devaraya II and a viceroy of Mulbagal, the work deals at great length with the tala. It describes over a hundred desi talas including some of the author's own inventions. Most importantly, the concept of taladasaprana (ten vital elements of tala) is elucidated for the first time in the work. This innovation was to prove so influential that, following its explication, all temporal activities in music and dance came to be organized and consolidated under these elements.

Sangitakalanidhi

To the same period belongs the third work of the Nonet, Kallinatha's Sangitakalanidhi, a versatile commentary on Sharngadeva's Sangita Ratnakara, the encyclopedic magnum opus on Indian music. It was about dancing and aesthetics of the thirteenth century. In the work, Kallinatha meticulously annotated, explicated, criticised and emphasised all the central issues of the Ratnakara; he also illumined it through comparison with contemporary practices, theories and norms of music and dance. He anticipated many developments in these arts.

Bhandaru Vittaleshwara's commentary

A Telugu commentary by Bhandaru (-ri?) Vittaleshwara on the Sangitaratnakara in the last quarter of the fifteenth century forms the fourth of the navaratnas.

Sangitasuryodaya

In 1525, Vittaleshwara's son Bhandaru (ri?) Lakshminarayana composed the fifth treatise, the Sangitasuryodaya, under the patronage of king Krishnadevaraya of Vijayanagara.

Talakalabdhi/Talakalavriddhi

In the generation that immediately followed, Achyutadevaraya's Talakalabdhi/Talakalavridhi was written. This was an important treatise on tala. This work organizes for the first time the theory and practice of the suladi talas' of the Haridasas in terms of the dasapranas. In the work, he also compiles views from several earlier works on tala such as Talakalavilasa, Sangitavidyavinoda, Jainamata, Sangitamarga, Chaturasabhavilasa, Sangitachudamani, Anjaneyamata, Nrttachudamani, Sangitamanidarpana, Katyayaniya, Sangitarnava, Rangaraja Bharatabhashya, Kapardi, and Parameshvara (all of them non-extant), and refutes them. Further, Achyutaraya applies all the five laghu-jatis to each suladi tala and thereby expands the scope and function of the suladi talas. Around the same time, Ashtavadana Somabhatta composed the Svararagasudharasa or Natyachudamani under the guidance of his guru Sitarama and probably under Achyutaraya's patronage. This work is now available only in fragments.

Swaramelakalanidhi

The final 'gem' in the series is the much celebrated Svaramelakalanidhi authored by the illustrious Kallinatha's grandson, Ramamatya ca. 1550. Ramamatya was the royal composer and architect in the court of de facto king Aliya Rama Raya. He described himself as abhinavabharatacharya and todara-malla (meaning "the hero" (malla) who wears the honorific anklet(todar)). The last epithet however, is usually interpreted by scholars as alluding to the Todarmal, a minister in Akbar's court, the anachronism notwithstanding. The Kannada term, in fact translates to 'the hero (malla) who wears the honorific anklet (todar)'.

Svaramelakalanidhi importance lies in the fact that it is more relevant and related to modern practice than the books written prior to it. The work, spread over five chapters deals primarily with Raga and preliminary to it, describes the Mela-s for the classification of Raga - and the different Suddha svara-s and Vikrta svara-s constituting the Mela-s. Similar works by other celebrated contemporaries like Pandarika Vitthala and Somanatha project a common theme, namely the description of Ragas, classification under Melas and the enumeration of the Suddha and Vikrta svaras constituting the Melas. Minor ideological differences can however be discerned among these works.

The Svaramelakalanidhi brings the theory up to date, rationalizes intervals and scales, introduces the concepts of svayambhu-svara (self-generating note, upper partial), dharashruti paryayatattva and pratinidhitattva of svaras. Mukhari is established as the shuddhasvara saptaka. It also fixes and standardizes musical intervals on the keyboard, defines the accordatura, range, preferred strings (for particular notes) etc., for a variety of stringed keyboards. It also innovates and dedicates a new keyboard to Achyutaraya. A new scheme for classifying ragas into uttama (superior), madhyama (middling) and adhama (inferior) on the basis of their expressive potential is also expounded in the work. It also resolves the problem of the antara and kaishiki notes.

== See also ==
- Vijayanagara Empire
- Carnatic music
- Haridasas and Carnatic music
- Annamacharya
