= Ancient Indian rhetoric =

Traditional forms of an Indian art of discourse

India has a long tradition of rhetoric about politics, philosophy, and religion, starting from ancient times.

== Overview ==
Indian rhetors in the seventh century BCE held public debates on religion to the public's amusement. The Vedic verses, composed over three thousand years ago, use similes that indicate a developed sense of rhetorics in the intellectual sections of the society.

The ancient Indian epics, the Ramayana and Mahabharata, include many speeches and debates that are examples of rhetoric. Indian rhetoric utilizes systems of categorization. The Upanishads, a collection of ancient Vedic philosophical dialogues, place some value in categorizing technical terms.

Indian Buddhist rhetoric places value in calm and humorous discourse.

=== Nyaya Rhetoric ===
Lloyd (2007) has proposed Nyaya’s inclusion in the field of rhetorical studies, exploring its methods within their historical context, comparing its approach to the “traditional logical syllogism, and relating it to the contemporary perspectives Stephen Toulmin, Kenneth Burke, and Chaim Perelman.”

Nyaya is a Sanskrit word which means just or right and refers to “the science of right and wrong reasoning” (Radhakrishnan & Moore, 1957, p. 356). Sutra is also a Sanskrit word which means string or thread. Here Sutra refers to a collection of aphorism in the form of a manual. Each Sutra is a short rule usually consisted of one or two sentences. Example of a Sutra: “Reality is truth, and what is true is so, irrespective of whether we know it is, or are aware of that truth.” The Nyaya Sutra is an ancient Indian Sanskrit text composed by Aksapada Gautama. It is the foundational text of the Nyaya School of Hindu Philosophy. The date when the text was composed, and the biography of its author is unknown. It is estimated that the text was composed between 6th-century BCE and 2nd-century CE. Zimmer (2013) has said that the text may have been composed by more than one author, over a period of time. Radhakrishan and Moore (1957) placed its origin in the “third century BC…..though some of the contents of the Nyaya Sutra are certainly a post-Christian era” (p. 36). Vidyabhusana (1930) stated that the ancient school of Nyaya extended over a period of one thousand years, beginning with Gotama about 550 BC and ending with Vatsyayana about 400 AD.

Nyaya provides significant insight into the Indian rhetoric. Naya presents an argumentative approach that works a rhetor how to decide about any argument. In addition, it proposes a new approach of thinking of a cultural tradition which is different from the Western rhetoric. It also broadens the view of rhetoric and the relationship among human beings. Nyaya proposes an enlightenment of reality which is associated with situations, time, and places. Toulmin emphasizes on the situational dimension of argumentative genre as the fundamental component of any rhetorical logic. On the contrary, Nyaya views this situational rhetoric in a new way which offers context of practical arguments.
