= Vidyabhushana (surname) =

Vidyabhushana is a surname. Notable people with the surname include:

- Vidyabhushana (born 1952), Tulu singer
- Baladeva Vidyabhushana (1700–1793), Indian religious teacher
