= Samaga =

Samaga is the surname used by some of the members of Shivalli Madhwa Brahmin community of Udupi and Dakshina Kannada (South Kanara) districts of Karnataka state, India (Bharath). The word Samaga originated because of their proficiency in reciting the difficult Sama "Sama gaayathi yaha, vaha Samaga".
