= Svaramelakalanidhi =

1550 musicological treatise by Ramamatya

Swaramelakalanidhi is a much celebrated musicological treatise of 16th century the Vijayanagara Empire. Authored by Ramamatya in the year 1550, the work is counted among the sangita shastra navaratnas or the nine 'gems' of the theory of Carnatic Music. The work's importance lies in the fact that it is more relevant and related to modern practice than the books written prior to it. Spread over five chapters, it deals primarily with the theory of raga, describes the melas for the classification of raga -and the different shuddha svaras and vikrta svaras constituting the melas.

Works by other celebrated contemporaries like Pundarika Vitthala and Somanantha also deal with similar themes, namely the description of ragas, their classification under melas and the enumeration of the shuddha and vikrta svaras constituting the melas. Minor ideological difference can however be discerned among these works.

== The author ==
Ramamatya was the grandson of the illustrious Kallinatha (the author of an authoritative commentary to Sarngadeva's Sangita Ratnakara). He was also the royal composer and architect at the court of king Ramaraja. He described himself as abhinavabharatacharya and todara-malla (meaning "the hero (malla) who wears the honorific anklet (todar)"). The Kannada term means hero (malla) who wears the honorific anklet (todar). The last epithet is however, usually interpreted by some as alluding Todarmal, a minister in the Mughal emperor Akbar's court, the anachronism notwithstanding.

== The work ==
The Svaramelakalanidhi brings the theory up to date, rationalizes intervals and scales, introduces the concepts of svayambhu-svara (self-generating note, upper partial), .dharashruti paryayatattva and pratinidhitattva of svaras. Mukhari is established as the shuddhasvara saptaka. It also fixes and standardizes musical intervals on the keyboard, defines the accordatura, range, preferred strings (for particular notes) etc., for a variety of stringed keyboards. Among other things, it also innovates and dedicates a new keyboard to king Achyutaraya. A new scheme for classifying ragas into uttama (superior), madhyama (middling) and adhama (inferior) on the basis of their expressive potential is also expounded in the work. It also resolves the problem of the antara and kaishiki notes.

The work is divided into five chapters viz.,

1. Upodghataprakarana
2. Svaraprakarana
3. Vinaprakarana
4. Melaprakarana
5. Ragaprakarana

== See also ==
- Karnataka Music
- Vijayanagara musicological nonet
- Melakarta
- Haridasas and Carnatic music
