= Badaganadu Brahmin =

The Badaganadu are a Brahmin community that mainly reside in Karnataka and in Tamil Nadu. They are followers of either the Advaita Vedanta propounded by Adi Shankara or the Dvaita Vedanta propounded by Madhvacharya and hence there are Smarthas and Madhwas among them.

== See also ==
- Hoysala Karnataka Brahmins
- Forward Castes
- Madhwa Brahmins
- Smartha Brahmins
