= Bhima Jewellers =

Indian jewellery retail group

Bhima Gold Private Limited

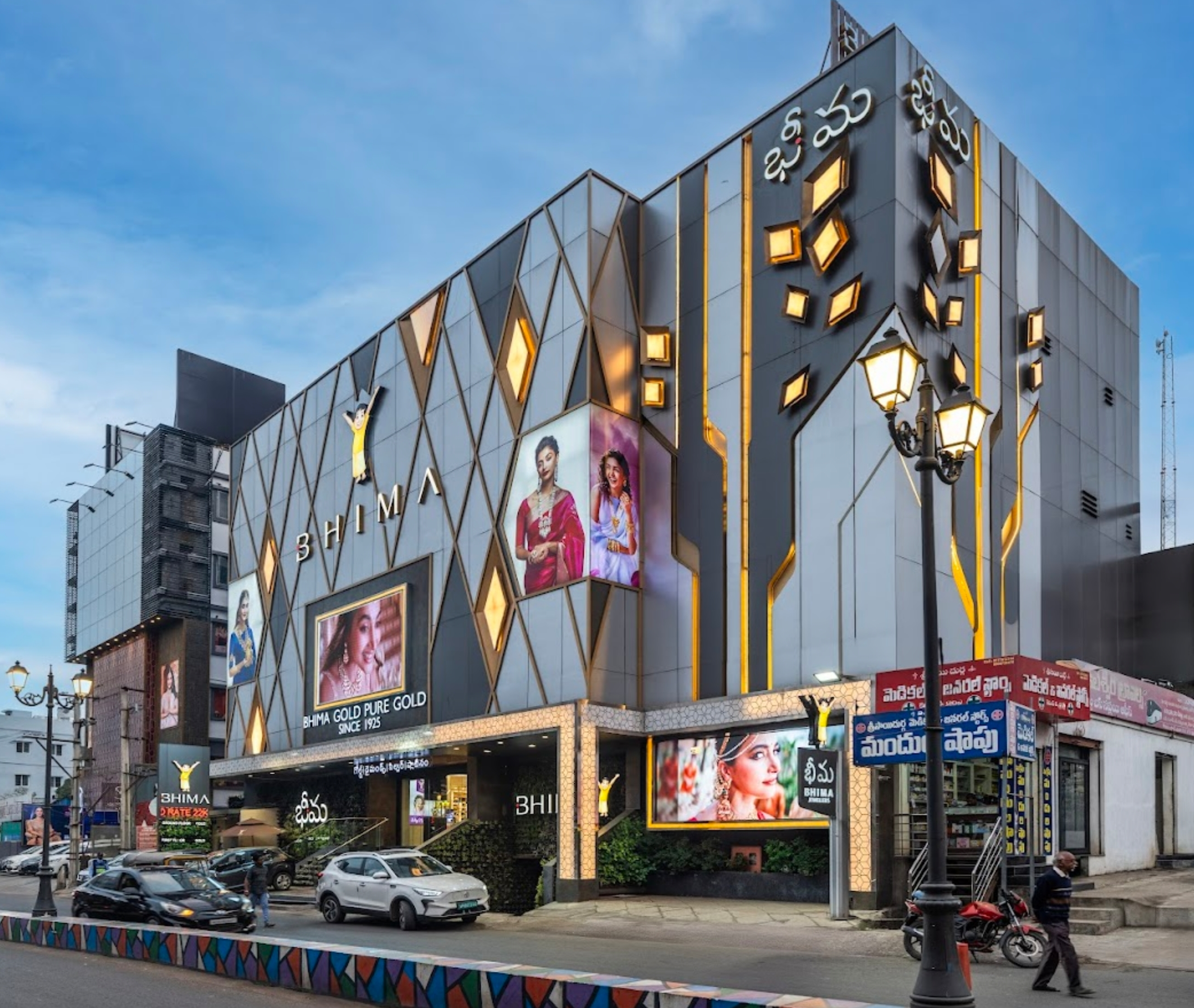
- Bhima Jewellers flagship store at Rajamahendravaram
- Type: Private
- Industry: Jewellers
- Founded: 1925; 101 years ago
- Founder: Bhima Bhattar
- Headquarters: India
- Number of locations: 22+ stores
- Area served: India, United Arab Emirates
- Key people: B. Krishnan; B. Govindan; Vishnusharan Bhatt
- Products: Gold, Diamond, Platinum, Silver, Watches
- Revenue: ₹48,000 crore (2022)
- Number of employees: 7,000+
- Website: www.bhimagold.com

Bhima Gold is an Indian jewellery group that designs, manufactures, and retails gold, diamond, and platinum jewellery. It was founded by Bhima Bhattar in 1925. It was the first jewellery retailer in India to introduce the "ready-made" jewelry concept, allowing customers to purchase finished ornaments directly from the counter. Following the founder's passing, the group was managed by his five sons who expanded the brand into distinct territorial headquarters while maintaining a unified identity.

The group operates a vast network across India and the United Arab Emirates. In late 2024, its Thiruvananthapuram flagship store entered the Guinness World Records for achieving the highest single-day revenue for a single jewellery showroom, recording sales of approximately ₹200 crore.

== History ==
Bhima Gold Indian jewellery group founded in 1925 by Bhima Bhattar, operating in India and the UAE The origins of the business are traced back to the British colonial era; observing the East India Company's trade in gold coins, Bhima Bhattar saw a retail opportunity. The venture began when the founder melted his wife's silver anklet to craft a silver glass, which he then traded for gold coins to initiate his stock.

Following the founder's passing, the group was managed by his five sons who expanded the brand into distinct territorial headquarters while maintaining a unified identity. In 2012, Bhima announced a 2-year plan to expand its jewellery network by investing ₹5,500 crore.

Bhima Gold marked its centenary in 2025–2026, commemorating 100 years since its founding in 1925. As part of the centenary observances, the company released a documentary film titled Together Purever on 6 January 2026. The group launched the "Golden Super Surprise" campaign, offering customers significant discounts across its showrooms in Telangana, Andhra Pradesh, and Karnataka to thank patrons for a century of support.

== Expansion ==
=== Domestic operations ===
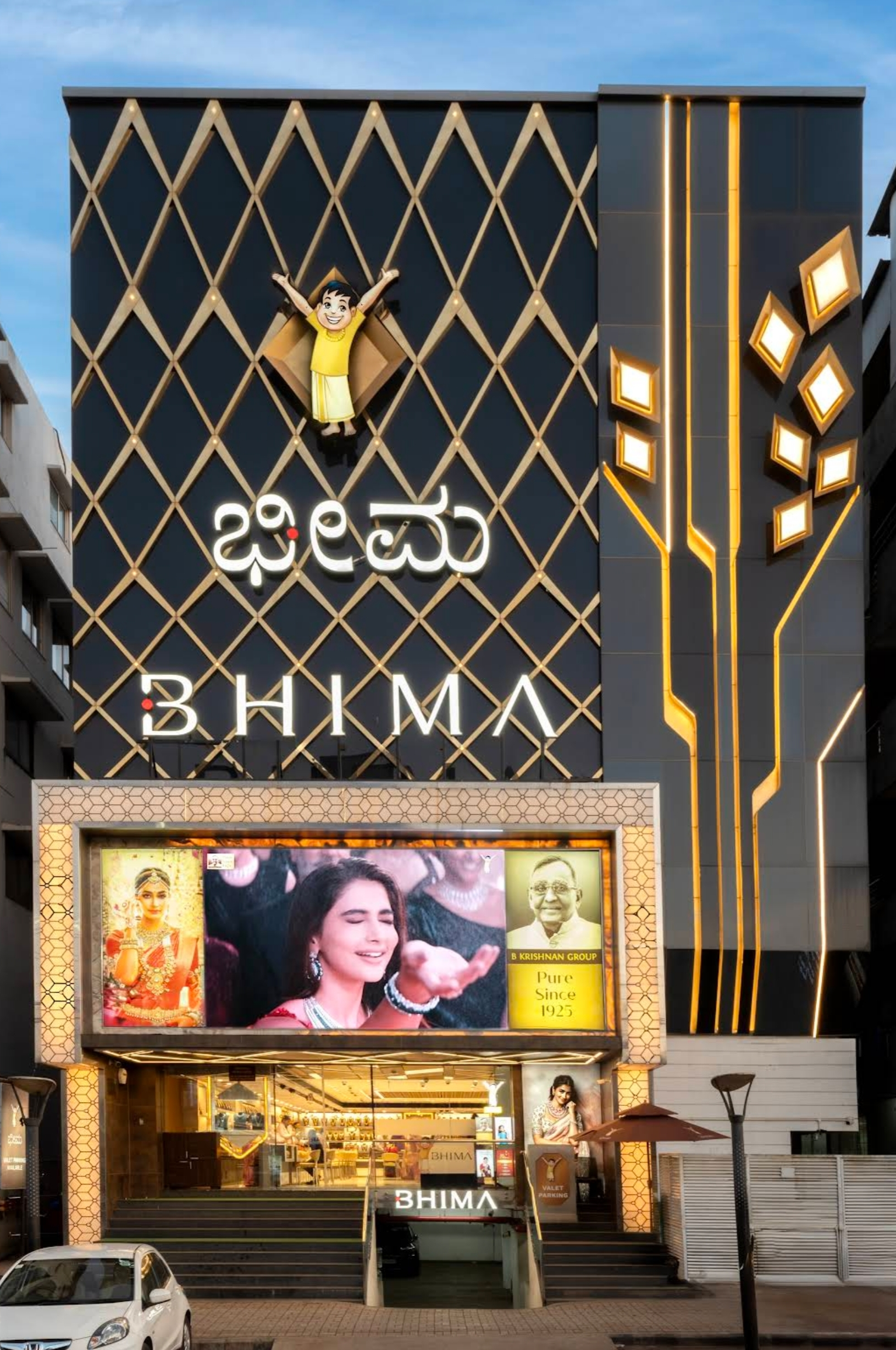
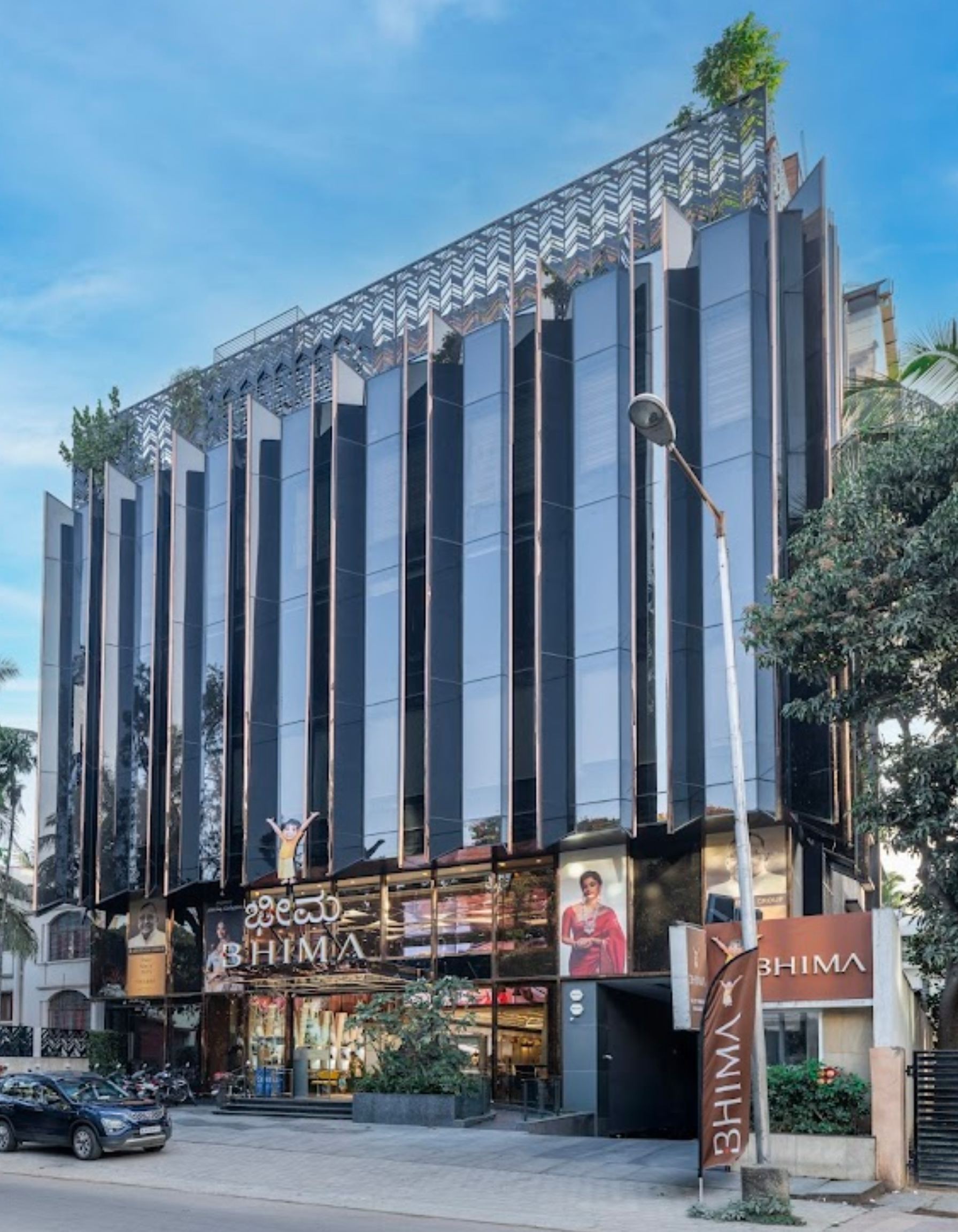
Bhima Jewellers flagship stores at Belagavi and Koramangala

Bhima has branches at Bengaluru, Chennai, Hubballi, Belagavi, Hosur, Udupi, Vijayawada, Rajamahendravaram, Mangaluru Nagercoil, Madurai, Kottayam, Thirunelveli, Thiruvananthapuram and Kochi.

In 2021, Bhima forayed into the Chennai market with a large flagship store. The group expanded its presence in Andhra Pradesh by opening a major showroom in Vijayawada. In Telangana, the brand operates multiple outlets in Hyderabad, including stores in Kondapur, Chanda Nagar, and Hitech City.

The group previously announced plans to open 10 to 12 new stores annually to sustain growth. In Karnataka, the brand expanded its HBR Layout store and maintained a strong presence in Bengaluru.

=== International operations ===
Bhima Jewellers operates several showrooms in Dubai, celebrating major milestones and anniversaries within the United Arab Emirates. In 2021, in Sharjah, the group relaunched and expanded its Muweilah store to accommodate the growing South Indian diaspora, including Tamil, Kannada, and Telugu patrons. To coordinate regional operations, Bhima opened a 6,000-square-foot regional headquarters in Dubai, an event attended by dignitaries including members of the Travancore royal family.

In 2024, the group raised Dh1 billion to fund the opening of 18 new showrooms across the GCC region over the next three years. Plans include expanding into Qatar and Bahrain. In 2025, the group inaugurated its first Abu Dhabi showroom at the Madinat Zayed Shopping Centre.

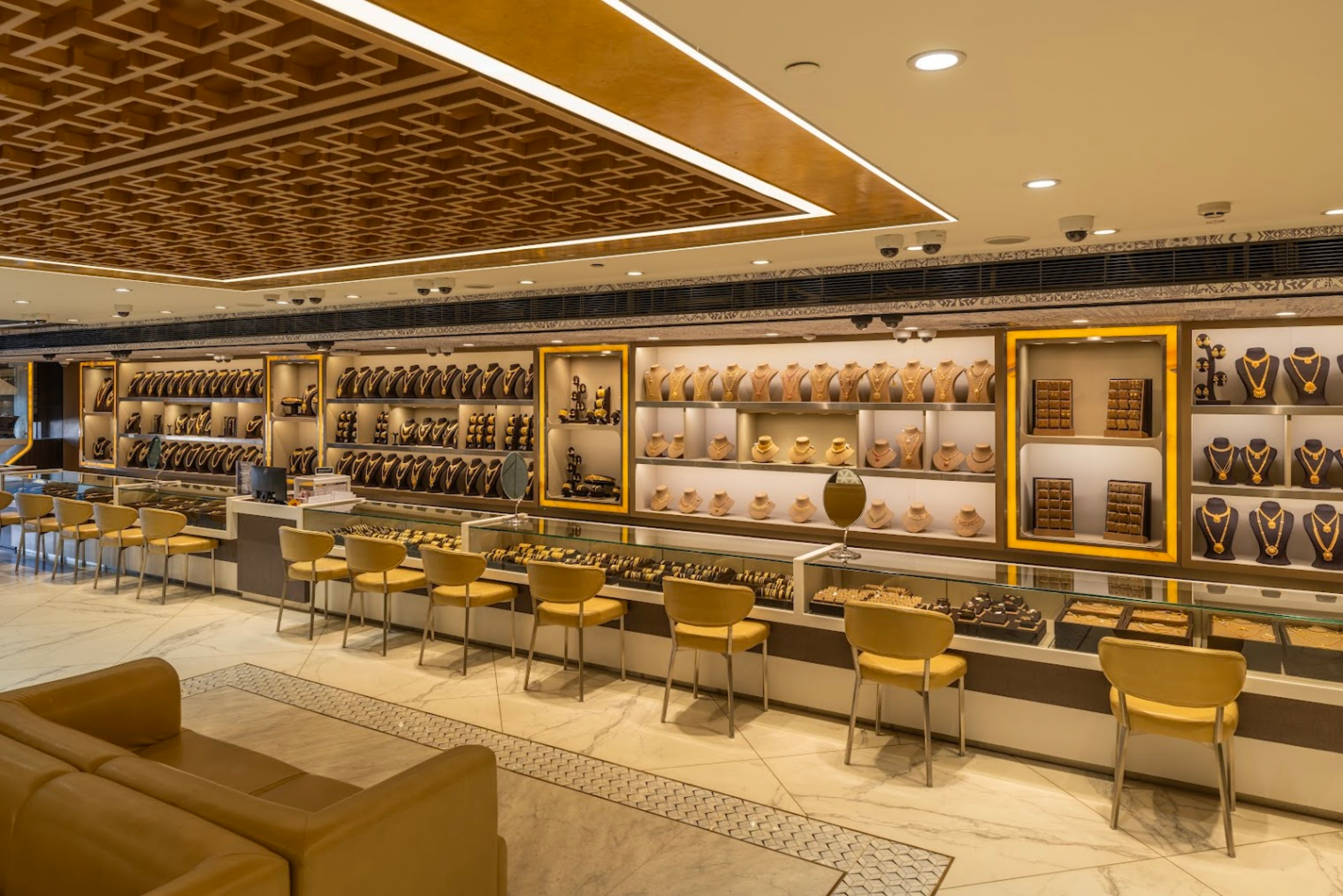
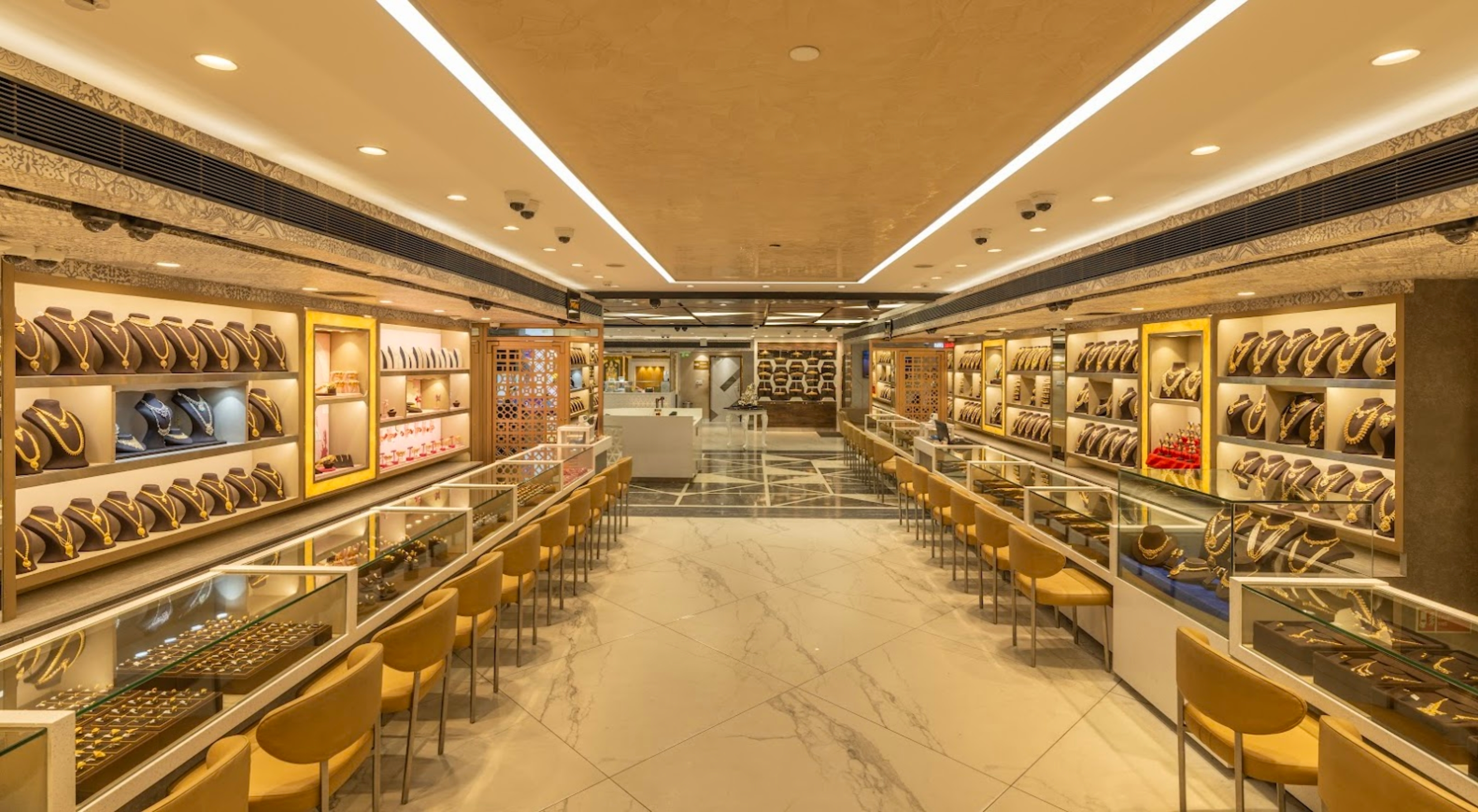
Interior view of the flagship stores at Belagavi and Rajahmundry

== Marketing ==
=== Bhima Boy ===
The Bhima Boy is the mascot and trademark of Bhima Jewellers.

=== Brand ambassadors ===
Pooja Hegde was appointed as Bhima Jewellers' first-ever brand ambassador in 2022, in its 97-year history. In 2024, Ram Charan was also appointed as the brand ambassador.

=== Campaigns ===
In 2021, the brand released a critically acclaimed advertisement portraying the journey of a transgender woman, which went viral for its message of unconditional love.

Bhima frequently sponsors "Happy Streets" events in Bengaluru cities like Malleswaram and Mei Layout to foster community spirit.

== Awards and recognition ==
Bhima Jewellers has been recognised in Kerala for its retail tax contributions and participation in the Grand Kerala Shopping Festival organised by the Government of Kerala. In 2024, its Thiruvananthapuram showroom reportedly recorded single-day sales of approximately of ₹200 crore.
