= Krishna Nee Begane Baro =

Song composed by saint Vyastirtha

Krishna Nee Begane Baro (transl. Krishna, you come fast) is a widely known classical song in Kannada language. It is composed in Raga Yamunakalyani by Vyasatirtha. The Tala is Misra chapu.

== Composer and Singer ==
Vyasaraya Tirtha or Vyasatirtha (1460–1539) (also known as Vyasaraja, Vyasaraayaru), a Haridasa, was born at Bannur in the Mysore District of Karnataka state. He is regarded as one of the foremost dialecticians in the history of Indian philosophy. He belonged to the Dvaita school of Madhvacharya. He along with Jayatirtha, helped in systematizing Dvaita into an established school of Vedic thought. Vyasatirtha's genius lay in his clear understanding and exposition of all his opposing schools of thought, for which even his opponents admired him. He was a master at debate and dialogue in logic and philosophy.

== Lyrics ==
=== Lyrics in Latin script ===
Kr̥ṣṇa nī bēganē bārō ||pa||

Bēgane bārō nī mukhavannu tōrō ||a.pa||

Kālālanduge gejje nīlada bhāvuli
Nīlavarṇane nāṭyavāḍuta bārō ||1||

Uḍiyalli uḍugejje beraḷalli uṅgura
Koraḷalli hākida vaijayantimāle ||2||

Kāśī pītāmbara kaiyalli koḷalu
Pūsida śrī gandha maiyoḷu ghamaghama ||3||

Tāyige bāyalli jagavannu tōrida
Jagadōddhāraka namma uḍupi śrī kr̥ṣṇa ||4||

=== Lyrics in Kannada script ===
ಕೃಷ್ಣ ನೀ ಬೇಗನೇ ಬಾರೋ ॥ಪ॥

ಬೇಗನೆ ಬಾರೋ ನೀ ಮುಖವನ್ನು ತೋರೋ ॥ಅ.ಪ॥

ಕಾಲಾಲಂದುಗೆ ಗೆಜ್ಜೆ ನೀಲದ ಭಾವುಲಿ
ನೀಲವರ್ಣನೆ ನಾಟ್ಯವಾಡುತ ಬಾರೋ ॥1॥

ಉಡಿಯಲ್ಲಿ ಉಡುಗೆಜ್ಜೆ ಬೆರಳಲ್ಲಿ ಉಂಗುರ
ಕೊರಳಲ್ಲಿ ಹಾಕಿದ ವೈಜಯಂತಿಮಾಲೆ ॥2॥

ಕಾಶೀ ಪೀತಾಂಬರ ಕೈಯಲ್ಲಿ ಕೊಳಲು
ಪೂಸಿದ ಶ್ರೀ ಗಂಧ ಮೈಯೊಳು ಘಮಘಮ ॥3॥

ತಾಯಿಗೆ ಬಾಯಲ್ಲಿ ಜಗವನ್ನು ತೋರಿದ
ಜಗದೋದ್ಧಾರಕ ನಮ್ಮ ಉಡುಪಿ ಶ್ರೀ ಕೃಷ್ಣ ॥4॥

== Raaga ==
- Yamunakalyani (janya of Mechakalyani, the 65th melakarta)
- Arohana: S R2 G3 P M2 P D2 S
- Avarohana: S D2 P M2 P G3 R2 S

== See also ==
- Carnatic music
