= Madhva nama =

Madhva Nama

Information
- Religion: Hinduism
- Author: Sripadaraja
- Language: Kannada
- Period: 16th century
- Chapters: 32 Shlokas

Madhwanama is a special composition on Madhvacharya (kulaguru of madhvas) which is written by Sripadaraja.

== Significance ==
Madhvanama tells about the four avataras of Mukyaprana (vayu): Mukhyaprana, Hanuman, Bhima and Madhvacharya

== Sections ==
=== Mukhyaprana ===
He is the moolarupra (main rupa of vayu) and the one who gives support to the entire universe. There are four stanzas in this section.

=== Hanuman ===
Hanuman is the first Avatara of Mukhyaprana/Vayu. He was born in Treta Yuga and was a great devotee of lord Rama. There are seven stanzas praising in this section.

=== Bhima ===
Bhima was the strongest of all in Dvapara Yuga. He was one of the pandavas. He killed many bad demons. There are 11 stanzas in this section.

=== Madhvacharya ===
Lord Vayu took his third avatara as Madhvacharya in Kali Yuga. He is the main and the greatest Guru (teacher) of the madhwas (followers of the dvaita siddhanta). There are seven stanzas in this section.

== Phalastuti ==
This section tells us the virtues (benefits) of reciting Madhva Nama. The Phalastuti is written by the great poet Jagannatha dasa. There are three stanzas in this section.
