= Haridasas and Carnatic music =

The Haridaasas, the Vaishnava saints of Karnataka, are classified into the Vyaasakuta and Daasakuta. The Vyaasakuta were the pontifical saints known for their scholarship and exposition of Madhva's philosophy. The Daasakuta were the peripatetic saint disciples of the Vyaasakuta sanyasins. They were proficient singers and composers and used classical music and the Kannada language as a medium to propagate the teachings and philosophy of the Dvaita school. While Sripadaraya is sometimes credited with starting this musical movement, Purandaradaasa, a disciple of Vyaasasraaya, became renowned as Karnataka Sangita Pitaamaha.

The devotees of Panduranga Vitthala of Pandharapur in the Varakari tradition traveled through Karnataka and composed and wrote almost entirely in Kannada. The Haridaasas had a seminal influence on Carnatic music. Later composers from Karnataka and outside, including the venerated 'Trinity' and musical treatises exhibit and acknowledge these influences. They laid the foundations of what is today called Karnataka or Carnatic music.

== Theory ==
The 15th century marked a watershed period in the history of Indian classical music. Sripadarayaru, a contemporary of Kallinatha (the commentator on Sarngadeva's Sangitaratnakara), was a musician and composer who heralded the musical traditions of the Haridasa movement. Vyasarajaru, Vadirajaru, Purandaradasaru and Kanaka Dasaru (15th – 16th century) who followed in the tradition were contemporaries of celebrated musicologists like Ramamatya (Svaramelakalanidhi), Poluri Govindakavi (Ragatalachintamani) and Pundarika Vitthala (Sadragachandro`daya, Ragamala, Ragamanjari and Nartananirnaya). Other distinguished composers of the time included Tallapakam Annamacharya and his descendants, Bhadraachala Ramadas from Andhra, the Veerashaiva saint Nijagunashivayogi and Ratnakaravarni, the Jaina saint from Karnataka. Prolific contributions of these composers and their contemporaries marked a period of renaissance in the musical history of India and Carnatic music.

The impact of this renaissance was further amplified by the close proximity of these composers and theoretician. Paradigmatic changes, such as the merger of madhyama grama into Sadjagrama, the standardisation of all melodic materials within the frame of the Sadjagrama, a new alignment of intervallic values and scalar temperament, tuning of keyboard chordophones, models of melodic classification wrought during this period are reflected in the music and compositions of the Haridasas.

The tamburi (a stringed drone instrument) often identified with the Haridasas, is mentioned for the first time by Sripadaraya and subsequently by Vyasarayaru and Purandaradasaru. The Haridasas as well as Palkuriki Somanatha (14th century), Chandrashekhara and Nijaguna Shivayogi (16th century) give a wealth of technical vocabulary.

== Pedagogy ==
Purandaradasa is credited with laying the foundations of the systematic study of Karnataka Music. He composed the elementary solfeggio exercises called sarale (svarali), janti (varase), tala-alankaras as well as the group of songs called pillari gitas. These exercises form the first lessons in learning Carnatic music even today. Prasanna Venkatadasa (17th century) testifies in a song that Purandaradasa composed in the gita, thaya, suladi, ugabhoga, pada, padya-vrata (vrittanama) and prabandha forms. Though his thayas or prabandhas are not available now, some of his gitas or padas may be reconciled into prabandha types. The organisation of his gitas into a pedagogic scheme, however, seems to be the work of later Haridasas. Another popular song (kereya niranu kerege chelli) was originally a suladi and that yet another, the analekhara was initially a pillari gita. Svarajati, Varna, Kriti and other items may have been added to the scheme as late as the 18th century.

Purandaradasa is also believed to have introduced the mayamalavagaula raga scale as a pedagogic model. This raga was called malavagaula at the time, and lacked the second and fifth degrees. Purandaradasa or one of his peers added two notes to the scale, thus converting the pentatonic to a heptatonic scale. The Malavagaula was a mela as well as a raga, and had the largest number of ragas grouped under it. Malahari, an ancient raga, was also grouped under this mela. Purandaradasa and other Haridasas refer to the malavagaula, Malahari and several others by the collective name of battisa (32) raga. This pedagogic model differed from the theoretical standard of the suddha-svara-saptaka, which corresponds to the Kanakangi of the present day. The suladi talas, which include a large number of their compositions was also used to teach the beginners.

== Musical Material ==
=== Ragas ===
The Haridasas mention a corpus of thirty-two ragas called battisa raga, known in Karnataka since the 12th century with repeated mentions in medieval Kannada literature. The Haridasas employed a scheme of classification in which a set of ragas might have the same root name but were prefixed differently, thus grouping together ragas which differed widely in intervallic content. They also classified ragas into sets of five which alluded to the five primordial elements - prithvi, upp, tejas, vayu and akasha. Thanks to their descriptions in contemporary musical treatises, these ragas, names and classifications have survived to the present times enabling musicologists to recreate their music.

=== Tala ===
The Haridasas' most enduring contribution is to the theory and exposition of the tala. They organised them into a simple, comprehensive, logical and organic system, and systematised and reorganised the conceptual and empirical paraphernalia of the tala. They removed archaic and obsolescent details and accommodated forms from folk music and other sources. Importantly, they reduced the structural components and forms of desi talas to the bare minimum of suladi talas. They also created deshyadi and madhyadi talas. Minor adjustments between talas of the past and the talas of their own times were carried out while maintaining historical continuity.

They did this by working on talas, traditionally prescribed to ancient vernacular compositions known as salagasuda Prabandhas. After extensive modification at their hands, these songs came to be called suladis and the talas, suLadi taLas. These talas in their modern form are the dhruva, mathya, rupaka, jhampa, triputa, atta and eka talas. These developments were stabilised and sustained by successive generations of Haridasas who, in their large numbers, prolific and varied compositions gave currency to these talas. These talas are now in exclusive usage in Carnatic music.

=== Musical form ===
As early as the 14th century, Narahari Teertha offered the first model of the pada, which was adopted and developed by extensive experimentation by successive Haridasa composers. This became the prototype of the most important musical form of Carnatic music, the Kriti while retaining its original form as devaranama. The ancient salagasuda prabandhas were restructured into the suladi and ugabhoga, two independent forms. They drew upon several Kannada folk sources such as the lullaby, koluhaDu, udayaraga, suvvakke, sobane, gundakriya etc., to enrich Carnatic musical forms. Early prabandha forms, such as gadya, churnika, dandaka, shukasarita, umatilaka and sudarshana, were revived. They innovated with vrittanama. Vadiraja composed the Bhramaragita, the first musical opera in any south Indian language and the first koravanji dance drama. Spiritual and mundane conundrums feature prominently in their songs. Apart from their numerous compositions in Kannada, Purandaradasa composed in the Bhandira language while Vadiraja composed in Tulu also.

Their compositions use a range of musical instruments. These included the tamburi, vina, dandika, kombu, flute, ankle-bells, bhringimela, panchavadya maddala, bheri, rudravina, titti, nagasvara, conch, mridanga, cymbols, dundubhi, damaru, tambata, mauri, tuttuti, kinnari, and pancha maha shabda.

== Influence ==
The Haridasas played a crucial role in the growth of Carnatic music, influencing the composers of Andhra and Tamil Nadu. Tyagaraja’s biography acknowledges the influence of Purandaradasa; this influence is clear in the theme and treatment of several of Tyagaraja's compositions. Tulaja, the Maharashtra Ruler of Tanjore (1729–1735 AD), deals extensively in his Sangitasaramrita with the various musical forms of the Haridasas. He heaps praise on Vyasaraya and Purandaradasa as great composers and trendsetters in music. Numerous manuscripts in Tamil Nadu testify to the great popularity of Haridasa compositions as early as the 18th century. Purandaradasa, in fact was hailed as the father of Karnataka music, first in Tamil Nadu and then in the rest of the country. Though their compositions were imbued with the elements of Carnatic music and composed specifically in that tradition, their compositions have also made their way into the Hindustani music world, thanks mainly to eminent exponents of Hindustani music from northern Karnataka.

== See also ==
- Carnatic music
- Music of Karnataka
- Haridasa
- Dvaita
