= Grand Kerala Shopping Festival =

Annual event in India

Grand Kerala Shopping Festival ഗ്രാന്‍ഡ് കേരള ഷോപ്പിംഗ് ഫെസ്റ്റിവല്‍
- Status: Active
- Genre: Shopping festival
- Begins: 22 December
- Ends: 5 February
- Frequency: Annual
- Location: Kerala
- Country: India
- Years active: 7
- Inaugurated: 2007-2008
- Founder: Kerala Government
- Most recent: 2013-2014
- Area: Kerala
- Organiser: Government of Kerala
- Website: https://www.shoppingfestival.in/

Grand Kerala Shopping Festival (GKSF) is an annual shopping event in Kerala, India. The festival is conducted by Kerala's Tourism Department in co-ordination with the Industries & Commerce Department, Finance Department and Local Self Government Department. Through this shopping festival, the Kerala Government intends to transform the State into a hub for international shopping experience and there by Launch "Shopping Tourism" in the state. In the process, the brand image of Kerala Tourism would go a long way to help upgrade the infrastructure of traditional marketing center in Kerala.

== Details ==
The festival first started on 1 December 2007 to next year 15 January lasting for a period of 46 days with an aim to promote and develop commerce, trade and industrial sector of Kerala using the brand value of Kerala Tourism. The objective of the festival is to make the state an International shopping destination over a period of 5 years and create employment to develop traditional trade centers.

During this period stores and shops registered under the GKSF offer wide range of discounts, vat refunds etc. Shoppers are also provided with gift coupons for a fixed worth of purchase entering them into weekly draws.

Over 3,000 outlets selling jewellery, electronic goods, textiles, consumer-durables, cars and autos, as well as hotels, restaurants and shopping malls across the state register for this several days long Shopping Festival. The aim of the festival is to make Kerala an international shopping destination in five years on lines of Dubai and Singapore and thereby attract tourists in large number to the state. Regional hubs of commercial activity are being planned in major cities and towns for the shopping festival.

The 6th season of GKSF (2012-2013) also featured a contemporary art fair. The exhibition-come-sale featuring more than 300 works by over 200 artists was a first-of-its-kind attempt to address the lack of marketing opportunities for Kerala artists. The fair was inaugurated at Kanakakkunnu Palace in Thiruvananthapuram by Chief Minister Oommen Chandy with the sale of two paintings.
