= Sripadaraja =

Hindu saint and philosopher

Lakshminarayana Tirtha

Personal life
- Born: Abbur, Channapatna, India
- Notable work: Vagvajra
- Honors: Śrīpādarāja

Religious life
- Religion: Hinduism
- Order: Vedanta
- Philosophy: Dvaita, Vaishnavism

Religious career
- Teacher: Svarnavarna Tirtha
- Disciples: Vyasatirtha

Sripadaraja (Sanskrit: श्रीपादराज; Śrīpādarāja; 1422–1480) or Sripadaraya, also known by his pontifical name Lakshminarayana Tirtha, was a Hindu Dvaita philosopher, scholar and composer and the pontiff of the Madhvacharya mutt at Mulbagal. He is widely considered the founder of Haridasa movement along with Narahari Tirtha. He has influenced both Carnatic music and Hindustani music through his compositions. His songs and hymns, written under the mudra of Ranga Vitthala, contain the distillation of Dvaita principles infused with mysticism and humanism. He is also credited with the invention of the suladi musical structure and composed 133 of them along with several kirtanas. He was the advisor of Saluva Narasimha Deva Raya and mentored the young Vyasatirtha. He also authored a commentary on Jayatirtha's Nyaya Sudha called Nyayasudhopanyasa-Vagvajra. Sripadaraja is believed to be the incarnation of Dhruva.

== Life ==
Sripadaraja was born in a Madhva Brahmin family in Abbur, a village in Channapatna taluk, Karnataka. His father, Sheshagiriappa, served as an accountant while young Sripadaraja looked after the cattle, studying Sanskrit texts in his spare time. His mother was Giryamma. Tradition asserts that Sripadaraja was the cousin of Brahmanya Tirtha, who served as the pontiff of the Madhvacharya mutt at Abbur and the guru of Vyasatirtha. Legends speak of Svarnavarna Tirtha encountering young Sripadaraja on his way to Abbur and after a brief rapport, being amazed by the youth's innate intelligence. He would later tutor the youth and ordain him as a monk with the name Lakshminarayana Tirtha. Lakshminarayana Tirtha eventually succeeded Svarnavarna Tirtha as the pontiff of the mutt at Mulbagal. Sripadaraja was a contemporary of Vibhudendra Tirtha, the progenitor of the Raghavendra Math who conferred upon him the title Sripadaraja or Sripadaraya. Sripadaraja was considered the guru of Saluva Narasimha Deva Raya and educated Vyasatirtha in the Shastras. His songs and hymns were sung during the nighttime Bhajans at his mutt.

== Works and Legacy ==
Continuing the tradition of Vedanta, he authored a commentary on Nyaya Sudha of Jayatirtha called Vagvajra which, according to Sharma, "is a lucid and attractive commentary in 3500 granthas". He also adds that despite the exhaustive exposition and the graceful style, his role as a Haridasa eclipsed his scholarly work. He is often considered as the pioneer of Dasa Sahitya with his simple worded and spiritual hymns synchronised to music. Jackson conjectures that the simple and rural beginnings of Sripadaraya coupled with an intimate connection with his vernacular language influenced his poetry. He composed 13,000 suladis, which are songs containing a medley of different ragas and talas often employed to set the mood of the narrative. Sharma notes "His songs are more sublime than those of any others, and possess a happy blending of rhythm and meaning". Vyasatirtha, who succeeded him as the pontiff, furthered the musical legacy of Sripada by giving further impetus to the Haridasa movement, initiating bards like Purandara and Kanaka and composing several kirtanas himself. He also composed the Madhvanama, a composition about Vayu and his avatars, Hanuman, Bhima and Madhvacharya.

== Bibliography ==
- Devadevan, Manu V. (2016). A Prehistory of Hinduism. Walter de Gruyter GmbH & Co KG. ISBN 978-3110517378.
- Hebbar, B.N (2005). The Sri-Krsna Temple at Udupi: The History and Spiritual Center of the Madhvite Sect of Hinduism. Bharatiya Granth Nikethan. ISBN 81-89211-04-8.
- Jackson, William (2000). Holy People of the World: A Cross-cultural Encyclopaedia. ABC-CLIO. ISBN 9781576073551.
- Jackson, William (2016). "5". Vijayanagara Voices: Exploring South Indian History and Hindu Literature. Routledge. ISBN 9781317001928.
- Sharma, B.N.K (1937). The Cultural Heritage Of Indian Vol 4. RK Institute of Culture. ISBN 978-8187332053.
- Sharma, B.N.K (2000) [1961]. History of Dvaita school of Vedanta and its Literature, Vol 2 (3rd ed.). Bombay: Motilal Banarasidass. ISBN 81-208-1575-0.
