= Abbur, Bengaluru South district =

Abbur, Ramanagara Abbur (Channapatna)
- village
- Location in Karnataka, India Abbur, Ramanagara (India)
- Coordinates: 12.6991400°N 77.1744800°E
- Country: India
- State: Karnataka
- District: Bengaluru South
- Talukas: Channapatna

Government
  - Body: Village Panchayat

Languages
  - Official: Kannada
- Time zone: UTC+5:30 (IST)
- Nearest city: Ramanagara
- Civic agency: Village Panchayat

Abbur is a small village in the southern state of Karnataka, India. It is located in the Channapatna taluk of Bengaluru South district in Karnataka.

Abbur is situated on the banks of the River Kanva. The village is famous for its divine spirituality. The place is a home to Saints of Vaishnava prophets and Mula-Brindavan of Sri Brahmanya. It is believed that Sri Brahmanya Thirtha, a great saint meditated for a long period of time inside a cave in Abbur. Before leaving for Brindavana, he passed the legacy to Sri Vysaraja and pronounced him as the head of the mutt. The mutt is now termed as Kundapura Mutt. There are many idols that are worshipped here like Sita, Ramchandra, Lakshmidevi etc.

== See also ==
- Bengaluru South district
- Districts of Karnataka
