= Nijaguna Shivayogi =

Indian poet

Nijaguna Shivayogi was an Indian poet and a prolific writer in the Kannada language. He lived in the 15th century. He was a follower of the Veerashaiva faith (devotee of the Hindu god Shiva), which he attempted to reconcile with the Advaita Hinduism of Adi Shankaracharya. Tradition has it that Shivayogi was a petty chieftain of Kollegal taluk in modern Mysore district of Karnataka state, India. Considered a visionary of his time, his Vivekachintamani, written in encyclopaedic proportions and in prose style, and the Kaivalya Paddhati, a musical treatise consisting of songs are considered his most enduring works.

== Writings ==
The Vivekachintamani, written in ten chapters, characterises by subject over 1500 topics including astronomy, medicine, poetics, erotica, musicology and dance-drama (natya shastra). Each topic is divided into sub-topics and each sub-topic is further divided into items. For example, the topic of poetics includes a sub-topical description of alamkara (figures of speech) which includes 65 types of alamkaras. The writing was translated into Marathi language in 1604, and into Sanskrit language in 1652 and again in the 18th century, an indication of its importance among medieval Kannada language writings.

Shivayogi authored a collection of songs in early 15th century called the Kaivalya Paddhati (lit, "Songs of the pathway to emancipation"). These songs are best described as lyrical swara Vachanas (poems written to notes) set to various classical ragas ("tunes"). They are based on religious, philosophical and reflective themes and are quite unlike those composed by the contemporary Haridasas (devotee-saint-poets of the god Vishnu) of Karnataka. This work established Shivayogi as the originator of a mystical form of literature called Kaivalya Sahitya (lit "Kaivalya literature"), a synthesis of the Veerashaiva and Advaita philosophies, with an emphasis on knowledge as opposed to devotion. His influence on writers in the swara Vachana genre over the next three centuries is evident. Notable poets who were inspired by Shivayogi include Shadaksharadeva (Muppina Sadakshari), a contemporary poet, Chidananda Avadhuta (17th century), Sarpabhushana Shivayogi (18th century) and the itinerant poet Shishunala Sharif.

The Puratana Trividhi is a short work by him consisting of 77 tripadis (three-line verses) eulogising the 63 Nayanmars (devotee-saints of the Hindu god Shiva) of Tamil Nadu. His other compositions include Paramanubhava Bodhe, Paramartha Gita and Anubhavasara.
