= Bhima Bhattar =

Indian businessman and founder of Bhima jewellers

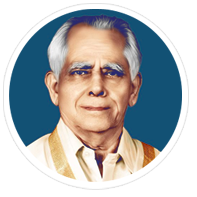
- Born: K. Lakshminarayana Bhattar; 27 July 1904; Udyavara, Udupi, Madras Presidency, British India (present day Karnataka, India)
- Died: 16 December 1985 (aged 81); Alappuzha, Kerala, India
- Occupation: Business
- Years active: 1924 – 1985
- Spouse: Vanaja
- Children: 12

K. Lakshminarayana Bhattar (27 July 1904 – 16 December 1985), popularly known as Bhima Bhattar, was an Indian businessman and founder of Bhima Jewellers. He pioneered the concept of ready made jewellery in Kerala with the establishment of Bhima Jewellers with his brothers at Mullakkal, Alleppey, the first of its kind in Kerala. He was the co-founder of All Kerala Gold and Silver Merchants Association.

== Early life ==
He was born in a Shivalli Madhwa Brahmin family in Udyavara, near Udupi in 1904. Later he moved to Alleppey to live with his brother-in-law, and used to help out at his restaurant, Girija Nivas, after school hours. He started a small business of selling perfumes and cosmetics at Girija Nivas while working there.

== Career ==
Bhattar recognised the potential in Alleppey for a market for silver jewellery, cutlery, and puja articles. He created a silver tumbler that proved popular. The business grew, and 22 carat gold jewellery was sold well. He was the first ready-made gold ornament jeweller in Kerala. He was one of the first diamond merchants in the Kerala state and also introduced Navaratna jewellery.

== Death ==
The demise of his wife Vanaja on 22 June 1984 came as a shock to Bhima Bhattar. He believed that she was the source of his tremendous success and good fortune. He died one year later on 16 December 1985, aged 81. Bhima Bhattar memorial Programs and Bhima Bala Sahitya Award were conducted early by the Bhima Group in the memory of K. Bhima Bhattar.
