= Vyasatirtha =

Indian philosopher (1447–1539)

Sri Vyasatirtha

Personal life
- Born: Yatiraja; 22 April 1447 Bannur, Karnataka
- Died: 8 March 1539 (aged 91) Hampi
- Resting place: Nava Brindavana
- Honors: Chandrikacharya, Vyasaraja

Religious life
- Religion: Hinduism
- Philosophy: Dvaita
- School: Vedanta

Religious career
- Teacher: Sripadaraja, Bramhanya Tirtha
- Predecessor: Bramhanya Tirtha
- Disciples: Purandara Dasa; Kanaka Dasa; Vijayendra Tirtha; Vadiraja Tirtha; Srinivasa Tirtha

Vyāsatīrtha (22 April 1447 – 8 March 1539), also called Vyasaraja or Chandrikacharya, was a Hindu philosopher, scholar, polemicist, commentator and poet belonging to the Madhwacharya's Dvaita order of Vedanta. As the rajaguru of Vijayanagara Empire, Vyasatirtha was at the forefront of a golden age in Dvaita which saw new developments in dialectical thought, growth of the Haridasa literature under bards like Purandara Dasa and Kanaka Dasa and an increased spread of Dvaita across the subcontinent. He himself composed many kīrtanas in Kannada and Sanskrit.

Three of his polemically themed doxographical works Nyayamruta, Tatparya Chandrika and Tarka Tandava (collectively called Vyasa Traya) documented and critiqued an encyclopaedic range of sub-philosophies in Advaita, (Note: Quote from Sastri: It was Vyasatirtha, who, for the first time took special pains to collect together from the vast range of Advaitic literature, all the crucial points for discussion and arrange them on a novel, yet thoroughly scientific and systematic plan.) Visistadvaita, Mahayana Buddhism, Mimamsa and Nyaya, revealing internal contradictions and fallacies. His Nyayamruta caused a stir in the Advaita community across the country requiring a rebuttal by Madhusudhana Saraswati through his text, Advaitasiddhi. He is considered as an amsha of Prahlada in the Madhva Parampara.

Born into a Brahmin family as Yatiraja, Bramhanya Tirtha, the pontiff of the matha at Abbur, assumed guardianship over him and oversaw his education. He studied the six orthodox schools of Hinduism at Kanchi and subsequently, the philosophy of Dvaita under Sripadaraja at Mulbagal, eventually succeeding him as the pontiff. He served as a spiritual adviser to Saluva Narasimha Deva Raya at Chandragiri though his most notable association was with the Tuluva king Krishna Deva Raya. With the royal patronage of the latter, Vyasatirtha undertook an expansion of Dvaita into the scholarly circles, through his polemical tracts as well as into the lives of the laymen through Carnatic classical devotional songs and Krithis. In this regard, he penned several kirtanas under the pen name of Krishna. His famous compositions are Krishna Nee Begane, Dasarendare Purandara, Krishna Krishna Endu, Olaga Sulabhavo and many more.

Politically, Vyasatirtha was responsible for the development of irrigation systems in villages such as Bettakonda and establishment of several Vayu temples in the newly conquered regions between Bengaluru and Mysore in-order to quell any rebellion and facilitate their integration into the Empire.

For his contribution to the Dvaita school of thought, he, along with Madhva and Jayatirtha, are considered to be the three great saints of Dvaita (munitraya). Scholar Surendranath Dasgupta notes, "The logical skill and depth of acute dialectical thinking shown by Vyasa-tirtha stands almost unrivalled in the whole field of Indian thought".

== Historical sources ==
Information about Vyasatirtha is derived from his biography by the poet Somanatha Kavi called Vyasayogicharita and inscriptional evidence. Songs of Purandara Dasa and traditional stories yield important insights too. Though Vyasayogicharita is a hagiography, unlike other works in the genre, it is free of embellishments such as performance of miracles and some of its claims can be corroborated with inscriptional evidence. Somanatha mentions at the end of the text that the biography was approved by Vyasatirtha himself, implying the contemporary nature of the work. While some scholars attest the veracity of the text to the claim that Somanatha was a Smartha hence free of sectarian bias, others question the claim citing a lack of evidence.

== Context ==
The philosophy of Dvaita or Tattvavada was an obscure movement within Vedanta in medieval India. Philosophically, its tenets stood in direct opposition to Advaita in that its progenitor, Madhva, postulated that the self (Atman) and god (Brahman) are distinct and that the world is real. As Advaita was the prevailing sub-sect of Vedanta at the time, the works of Madhva and his followers came under significant attack and ridicule. Madhva deployed his disciples to promulgate the philosophy across the country, which led to the establishment of a small and diffuse network of mathas, or centres of worship, across the subcontinent. The early years of Dvaita were spent spreading its basic tenets including participating in debates with the Advaita scholars.

Philosophical improvements were pioneered by Padmanabha Tirtha and subsequently perfected by Jayatirtha. Dasgupta contends that the latter's contributions brought Dvaita up to the standards of intellectual sophistication set by Advaita and Visistadvaita. By imbuing the nascent philosophy with structure and expanding upon Madhva's terse texts, he reinforced the intellectual position of Madhva and set the standard for Dvaita literature through his seminal work, Nyaya Sudha ('Nectar of Logic').

Subsequent authors such as Vishnudasacharya further expanded upon these texts and authored commentaries branching into diverse fields such as Mimamsa and Navya Nyaya, a tradition which would continue for centuries. Despite the intellectual growth, due to the turbulent political atmosphere of India at the time, penetration of Dvaita into the cultural collective of the subcontinent was limited. It was not until Sripadaraja, the pontiff of the matha at Abbur, who aligned himself with the Vijaynagara king Saluva Narasimha Deva Raya and served as his guru, that Dvaita would receive royal encouragement and a certain degree of power. But the Smartha Brahmins, adhering to the principles of Advaita, and Sri Vaishnavites, following the Visistadvaita philosophy of Ramanuja, controlled the Shiva and Vishnu temples respectively, thus limiting the influence of Dvaita.

== Early life ==
Vyasatirtha was born Yatiraja into a Madhva Brahmin family to Ramacharya (Ballanna) and Lakshmi Bai (Akkamma) in a hamlet called Bannur. According to Vyasayogicharita, the childless couple approached saint Bramhanya Tirtha, who granted them a boon of three children with the condition that the second child, who would turn out to be Yatiraja, be handed over to him. After Yatiraja's upanayana, Bramhanya Tirtha assumed guardianship over the child. Bramhanya was surprised by the precocious intellect of the child and intended to ordain him as a monk. Yatiraja, anticipating the ordination, decided to run away from the hermitage. While resting under a tree, he had a vision of Vishnu, who urged Yatiraja to return, which he did. He was subsequently ordained as Vyasatirtha. Indologist B.N.K Sharma contends that Vyasatirtha would have been 16 years of age at this time.

After the death of Bramhanya Tirtha during the famine of 1475–1476, Vyasatirtha succeeded him as the pontiff of the matha at Abbur in 1478 and proceeded to Kanchi, which was the centre for Sastric learning in South India at the time, to educate himself on the six orthodox schools of thought, which are: Vedanta, Samkhya, Nyaya, Mimamsa, Vaisheshika and Yoga. Sharma conjectures that the education Vyasatirtha received in Kanchi helped him become erudite in the intricacies and subtleties of Advaita, Visistadvaita, Navya Nyaya and other schools of thought. After completing his education at Kanchi, Vyasatirtha headed to Mulbagal to study the philosophy of Dvaita under Sripadaraja, whom he would consider his guru, for a period of five to six years. He was subsequently sent to the Vijayanagara court of Saluva Narasimha Deva Raya at the behest of Sripadaraja.

== At Chandragiri ==
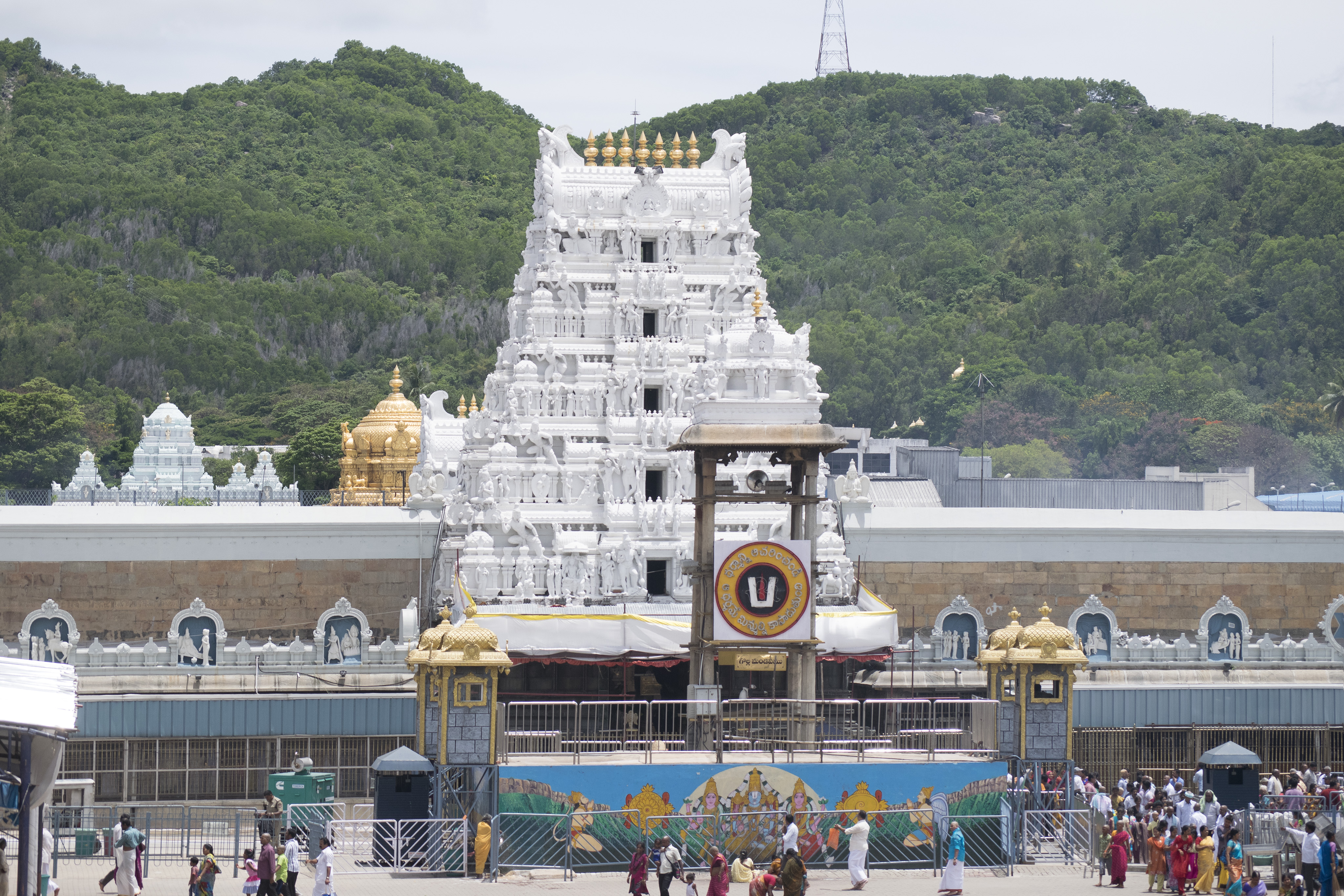
Vyasatirtha served as the head priest at the Venkateswara Temple, Tirumala.

Vyasatirtha was received by Saluva Narasimha at Chandragiri. Somanatha speaks of several debates and discussions in which Vyasatirtha was triumphant over the leading scholars of the day. He also talks about Vyasatirtha giving spiritual guidance to the king. Around the same time, Vyasatirtha was entrusted with the worship of the Venkateshwara deity at Tirupati and undertook his first South Indian tour (a tour entailing travelling to different regions in order to spread the doctrines of Dvaita). After the death of Saluva Narasimha, Vyasatirtha remained at Chandragiri in the court of Narasimha Raya II until Tuluva Narasa Nayaka declared himself to be the de facto ruler of Vijayanagara. At the behest of Narasa, Vyasatirtha moved to Hampi and would remain there for the rest of his life. After the death of Narasa, his son Viranarasimha Raya was subsequently crowned. Some scholars argue against the claim that Vyasatirtha acted as a spiritual adviser to Saluva Narasimha, Narasimha II and Vira Narasimha due to the lack of inscriptional evidence.

== At Hampi ==
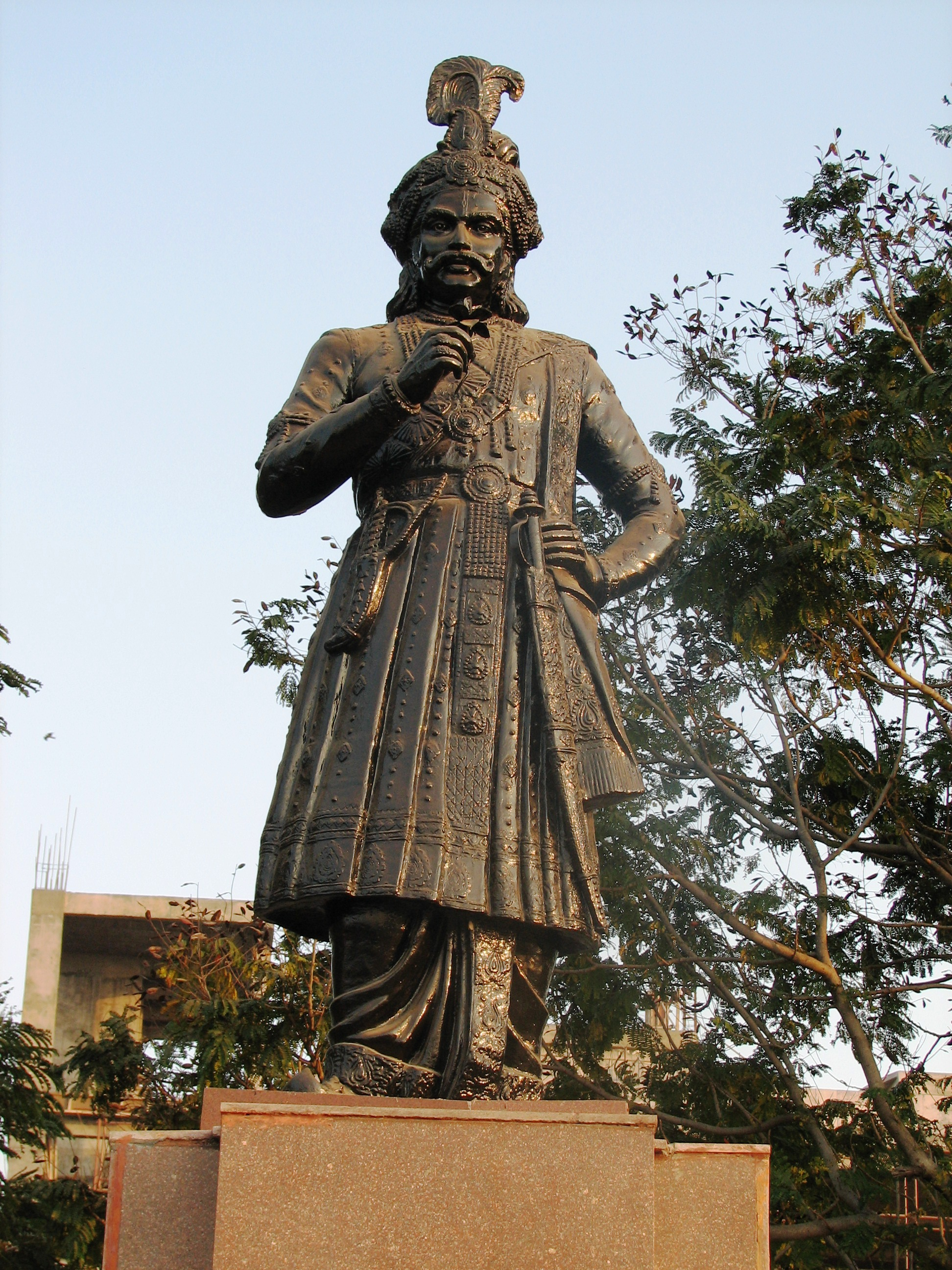
Vyasatirtha maintained cordial relationships with the royalty, especially Krishnadevaraya, who considered Vyasatirtha as his guru.

At Hampi, the new capital of the empire, Vyasatirtha was appointed as the "Guardian Saint of the State" after a period of prolonged disputations and debates with scholars led by Basava Bhatta, an emissary from the Kingdom of Kalinga. His association with the royalty continued after Viranarasimha Raya overthrew Narasimha Raya II to become the emperor. Fernão Nunes observes that "The King of Bisnega, everyday, hears the teachings of a learned Brahmin who never married nor ever touched a woman" which Sharma conjectures is Vyasatirtha. Sharma also contends that it was around this time that Vyasatirtha had begun his work on Tatparya Chandrika, Nyayamruta and Tarka Tandva. After the accession of Krishnadeva Raya, Vyasatirtha, who the king regarded as his kuladevata, greatly expanded his influence by serving as an emissary and diplomat to the neighbouring kingdoms while simultaneously disseminating the philosophy of Dvaita into the subcontinent. His close relationship to Krishnadeva Raya is corroborated by inscriptions on the Vitthala Temple at Hampi and accounts by the Portuguese traveler Domingo Paes. (Note: Quote from Paes: Raya being washed by a Brahmin whom he held sacred and who was a great favourite of his. Sharma conjectures that the washing of the disciple by the guru is found only among the Brahmins adhering to the Madhva tradition (mentioned in Madhva's Tantrasara).)

Vyasatirtha was also sent on diplomatic missions to the Bijapur Sultanate and accepted grants of villages in newly conquered territories for the establishment of Mathas. Stoker conjectures that this was advantageous to both the king and Vyasatirtha as the establishments of Mathas in these newly conquered regions led to political stability and also furthered the reach of Dvaita. Somanatha writes of an incident where Krishnadeva Raya was sent a work of criticism against Dvaita by an Advaita scholar in Kalinga as a challenge. After Vyasatirtha retaliated accordingly, Krishnadeva Raya awarded Vyasatirtha with a ratnabhisheka (a shower of jewels) which Vyasatirtha subsequently distributed among the poor. The inscriptions speak of grants of villages to Vyasatirtha from Krishnadeva Raya around this period, including Bettakonda, where he developed large irrigation systems including a lake called Vyasasamudra. This period of Vyasatirtha also saw the establishment of Dasakuta (translated as community of devotees), a forum where people gathered and sung hymns and devotional songs. The forum attracted a number of wandering bards (called Haridasas or devotees of Vishnu) such as Purandara Dasa and Kanaka Dasa.

== Time Period of Kuhu Yoga ==
Kuhu yoga parihara – Once Krishnadevaraya had Kuhu yoga. Sri Vyasarajaru, noticing that the kingdom is in trouble, asked the king to donate to Vyasarajaru, who ruled the state before the kuhuyoga period and during the period. When the Kuhuyoga came in the form of Krishna sarpa, he kept his kaavi on the simhasana which was burnt into ashes. Then after the Kuhuyoga period was over, the very next day itself, he asked the king to take back his kingdom. King Krishnadevaraya was reluctant to take back the kingdom, as he himself had donated the same to Sri Vyasarajaru, which would amount to Dattapahara dosha. But Sri Vyasarajaru insisted and ordered him to take back, so he took it.

== Later years ==
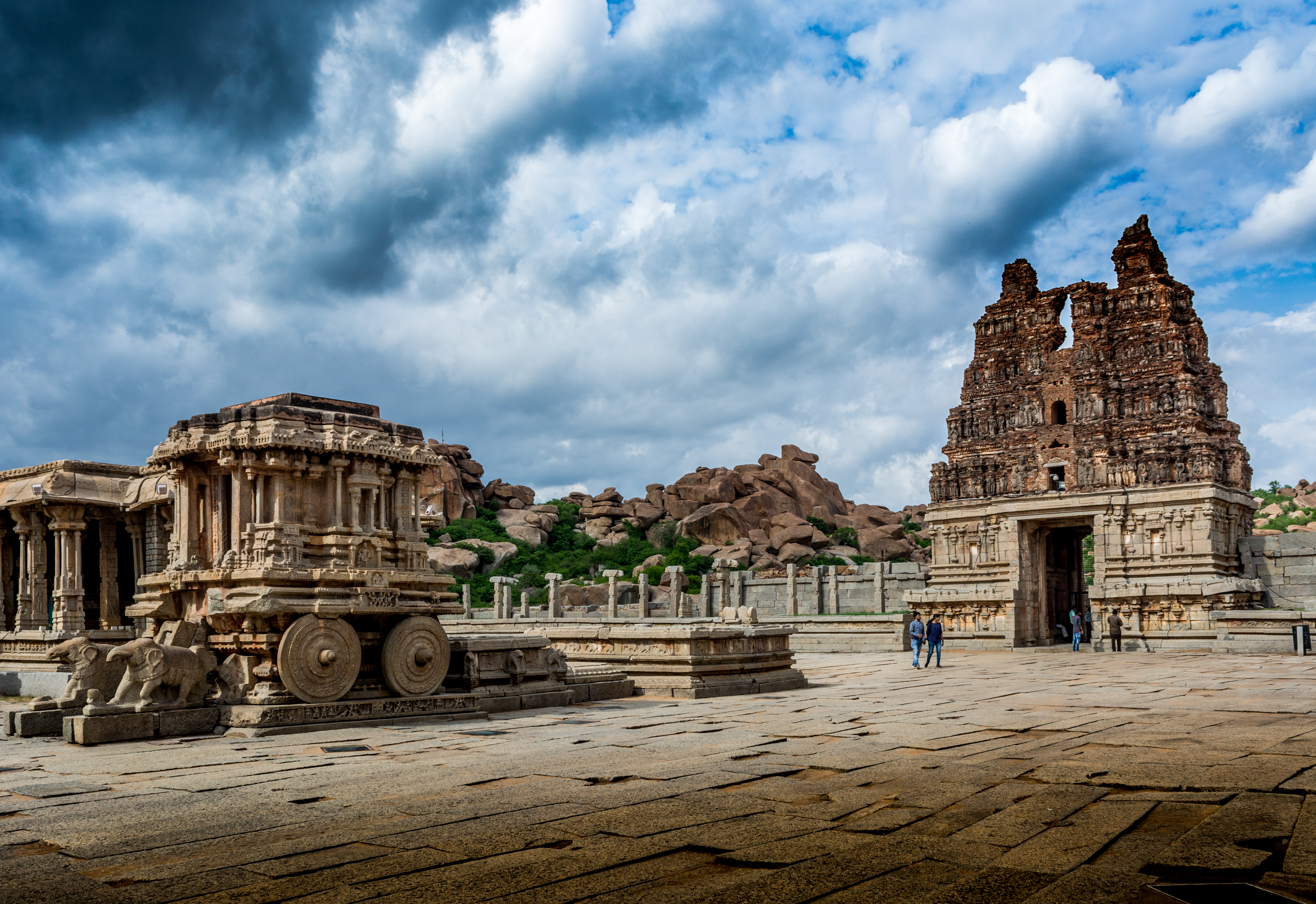
In his later years Vyasatirtha donated a Narasimha idol to the Vittala Temple.

There was a period of "temporary estrangement" from the royalty due to internal political friction, during which Vyasatirtha retreated to Bettakonda. After the death of Krishnadeva Raya, Vyasatirtha continued to advise Achyuta Deva Raya. Inscriptions speak of his donation of a Narasimha idol to the Vittala Temple at Hampi indicating he was still an active figure. His disciples Vijayendra Tirtha and Vadiraja Tirtha furthered his legacy by penning polemical works and spreading the philosophy of Dvaita into the Chola and the Malnad region, eventually assuming pontifical seats at Kumbakonam and Sodhe, respectively. He died in 1539 and his mortal remains are enshrined in Nava Brindavana, near Hampi. His remembrance day every year (called Aradhana) is celebrated in the month of Phalguna. He was succeeded by his disciple, Srinivasa Tirtha.

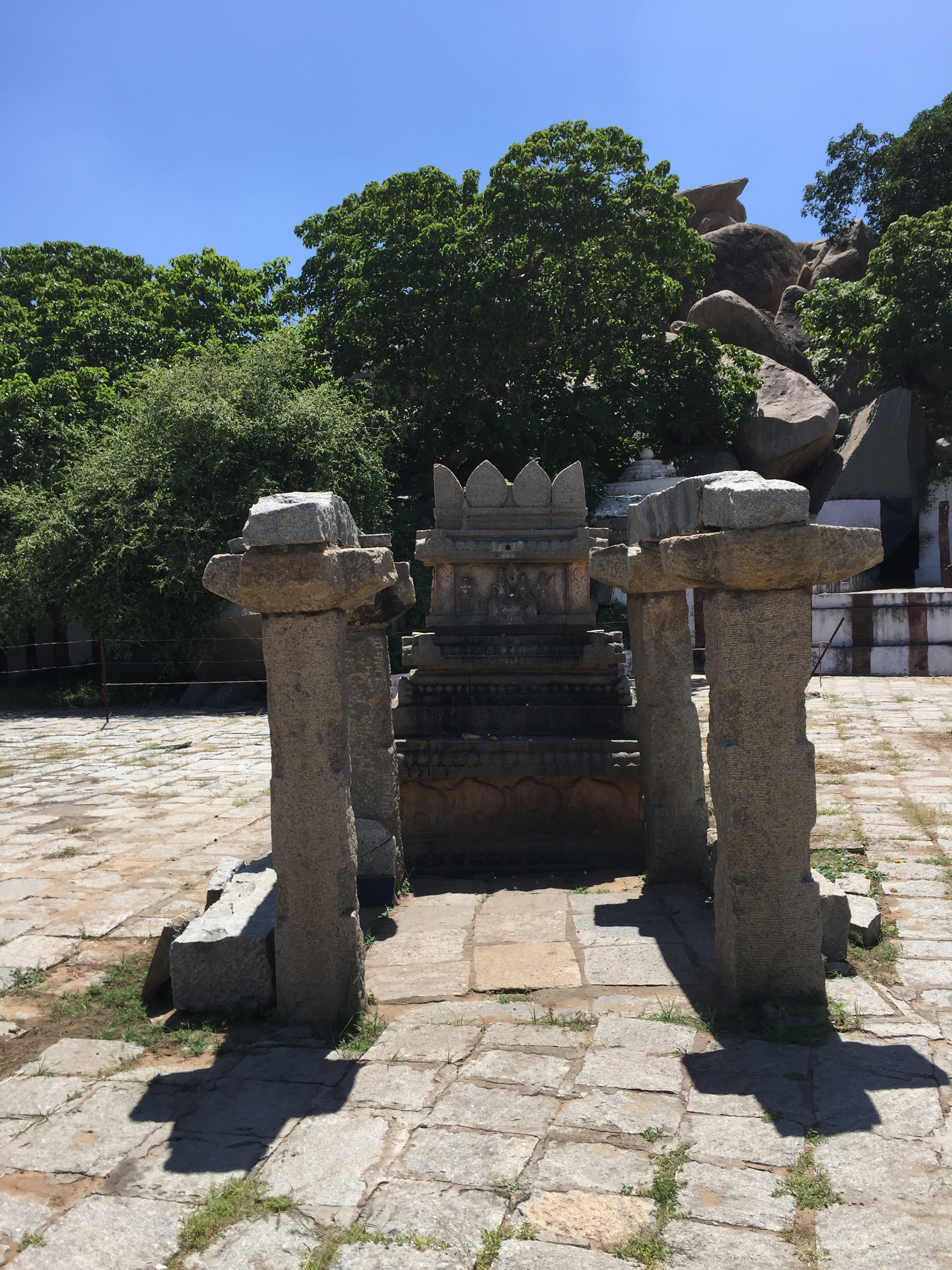
The tomb or Brindavana of Vyasatirtha in Anegundi (Note: In 2019, his tomb was dismantled by miscreants in search of a treasure. It was rebuilt the subsequent day by the devotees.)

== Works ==
Vyasatirtha authored eight works consisting of polemical tracts, commentaries on the works of Madhva and a few hymns. Visnudasacharya's Vadaratnavali, a polemical treatise against the tenets of Advaita, is considered to have influenced him. By tracing a detailed and historically sensitive evolution of systems of thought such as Advaita, Vyakarana, Nyaya and Mimamsa and revealing internal inconsistencies, McCrea contends that Vyasatirtha created a new form of doxography. Ramanuja's Visistadvaita as well as Nagarjuna's Madhyamaka is dealt with in Nyayamruta. This style of polemics influenced Appayya Dikshita, who authored his own doxographical work titled Śātrasiddhāntaleśasaṃgraha.

=== Nyayamruta ===
Nyayamruta is a polemical and expositional work in four chapters. Advaita assumes that the world and its multiplicity is the result of the interaction between Maya (sometimes also characterized as avidya or ignorance) and the Brahman. Therefore, according to Advaita, the world is nothing more than an illusory construct. The definition of this falsity of the world (called mithyatva) varies within Advaita with some opining that the world has various degrees of reality for example Appayya Dikshita assumes three degrees, while Madhusudhana Saraswati assumes two. The first chapter of Nyayamruta refutes these definitions of reality.

In the second chapter, Vyasatirtha examines role of pramanas in Dvaita and Advaita. Pramana translates to "proof" or "means of knowing". Dvaita assumes the validity of three pramanas: pratyeksha (direct experience), anumana (inference) and sabda (agama). Here, Vyasatirtha argues that the principles of Dvaita can be supported by the relevant pramanas and demonstrates this by verifying Madhva's doctrine of fivefold difference accordingly. (Note: According to Madhva, there exists five kinds of differences (called panchabheda) in the world. According to this doctrine: 1. no two individual souls or Atmans are alike. 2. Atman and Brahman are distinct and separate 3. Atman is distinct from Matter (called 'jada'). 4. No two particles of matter are alike 5. Brahman and matter are separate and distinct.) Subsequently, the Advaita concept of Nirguna Brahman is argued against. While the third deals with the critique of the Advaita view on the attainment of true knowledge (jnana), the fourth argues against soteriological issues in Advaita like Moksha, specifically dealing with the concept of Jivanmukti (enlightenment while alive). Vyasatirtha asks whether, for an Advaitin, the body ceases to exist after the veil of illusion has been lifted and the unity with the Brahman has been attained.

Nyayamruta caused a furore in the Advaita community resulting in a series of scholarly debates over centuries. Madhusudhana Saraswati, a scholar from Varanasi, composed a line-by-line refutation of Nyayamruta titled Advaitasiddhi. In response, Vyasa Ramacharya rebutted with Nyayamruta Tarangini and Pandurangi Anandabhattaraka with Nyayamruta Kantakoddhara. The former is criticised by Brahmananda Saraswati in his commentary on Advaitasiddhi, Guruchandrika. Vanamali Mishra composed a refutation of the Bramhananda Saraswati's work and the controversy eventually died down. Stoker conjectures that the strong responses Vyasatirtha received were due to the waning power of Advaita in the Vijayanagara empire coupled by the fact that as an administrator of the mathas, Vyasatirtha enjoyed royal patronage.

Vyasatirtha's disciple Vijayendra Tirtha has authored a commentary on the Nyayamruta called Laghu Amoda.

=== Tatparya Chandrika ===
Tatparya Chandrika or Chandrika is a commentary on Tattva Prakasika by Jayatirtha, which in turn is a commentary on Madhva's Brahma Sutra Bhashya (which is a bhashya or a commentary on Badarayana's Brahma Sutra). It not only documents and analyses the commentaries of Shankara, Madhva and Ramanuja on the Brahma Sutra but also their respective sub-commentaries. (Note: Bhamati, Panchapadika, Vivarana and Kalpataru of the Advaita school, Srutaprakasha and Adhikaranasaravali of the Visistadvaita school and Tattva Prakasika and Nyaya Sudha of the Madhva school.) The goal of Vyasatirtha here is to prove the supremacy of Madhva's Brahma Sutra Bhashya by showing it to be in harmony with the original source, more so than the other commentaries. The doxographical style of Vyasatirtha is evident in his copious quotations from the main commentaries (of Advaita and Visistadvaita) and their respective sub-commentaries under every adhikarna or chapter. Only the first two chapters of the Brahma Sutra are covered. The rest was completed by Raghunatha Tirtha in the 18th century.

=== Tarka Tandava ===
Tarka Tandava or "The Dance of Logic" is a polemical tract targeted towards the Nyaya school. Though Vyasatirtha and his predecessors borrowed the technical language, logical tools and terminologies from the Nyaya school of thought and there is much in common between the two schools, there were significant differences especially with regards to epistemology. Jayatirtha's Nyaya Sudha and Pramana Paddhati were the first reactions against the Nyaya school. The advent of Navya Nyaya widened the differences between the two schools especially related to the acquisition of knowledge or pramanas, triggering a systematic response from Vyasatirtha through Tarka Tandava. Vyasatirtha refers to and critiques standard as well as contemporary works of Nyaya: Gangesha Upadhyaya's Tattvachintamani, Nyayalilavati by Sri Vallabha and Udayana's Kusumanjali and their commentaries. The work is divided into three chapters corresponding to the three pramanas, and a number of topics are raised, including a controversial claim arguing for the supremacy of the conclusion (upasamhara) as opposed to the opening statement (upakrama) of the Brahma Sutra. Purva Mimamsa and Advaita adhere to the theory that the opening statement trumps the conclusion and base their assumptions accordingly. Vyasatirtha's claim put him at odds with the Vedanta community with Appayya Dikshita being his most vocal opponent. Vyasatirtha's claim was defended by Vijayendra Tirtha in Upasamhara Vijaya.

=== Mandara Manjari ===
Mandara Manjari is the collective name given to Vyasatirtha's glosses on three (Mayavada Khandana, Upadhi Khandana, Prapancha Mithyavada Khandana) out of Madhva's ten refutation treatises called Dasha Prakarna and one on Tattvaviveka of Jayatirtha. Vyasatirtha here expands only on the obscure passages in the source text.

=== Bhedojjivana ===
Bhedojjivana is the last work of Vyasatirtha as it quotes from his previous works. The main focus of this treatise is to emphasise the doctrine of difference (Bheda) in Dvaita as is evident from the title, which can be translated to "Resuscitation of Bheda". Sarma notes "Within a short compass, he has covered the ground of the entire Monistic literature pushed into contemporary prominence and argued an unexpurgated case for the Realism of Madhva".

== Legacy ==
Vyasatirtha is considered to be one of the foremost philosophers of Dvaita thought, along with Jayatirtha and Madhva, for his philosophical and dialectical thought, his role in spreading the school of Dvaita across the subcontinent and his support to the Haridasa movement. Sharma writes "we find in his works a profoundly wide knowledge of ancient and contemporary systems of thought and an astonishingly brilliant intellect coupled with rare clarity and incisiveness of thought and expression". His role as an adviser and guide to the Vijayanagara emperors, especially Krishna Devaraya, has been notable as well.

=== Spread of Dvaita ===
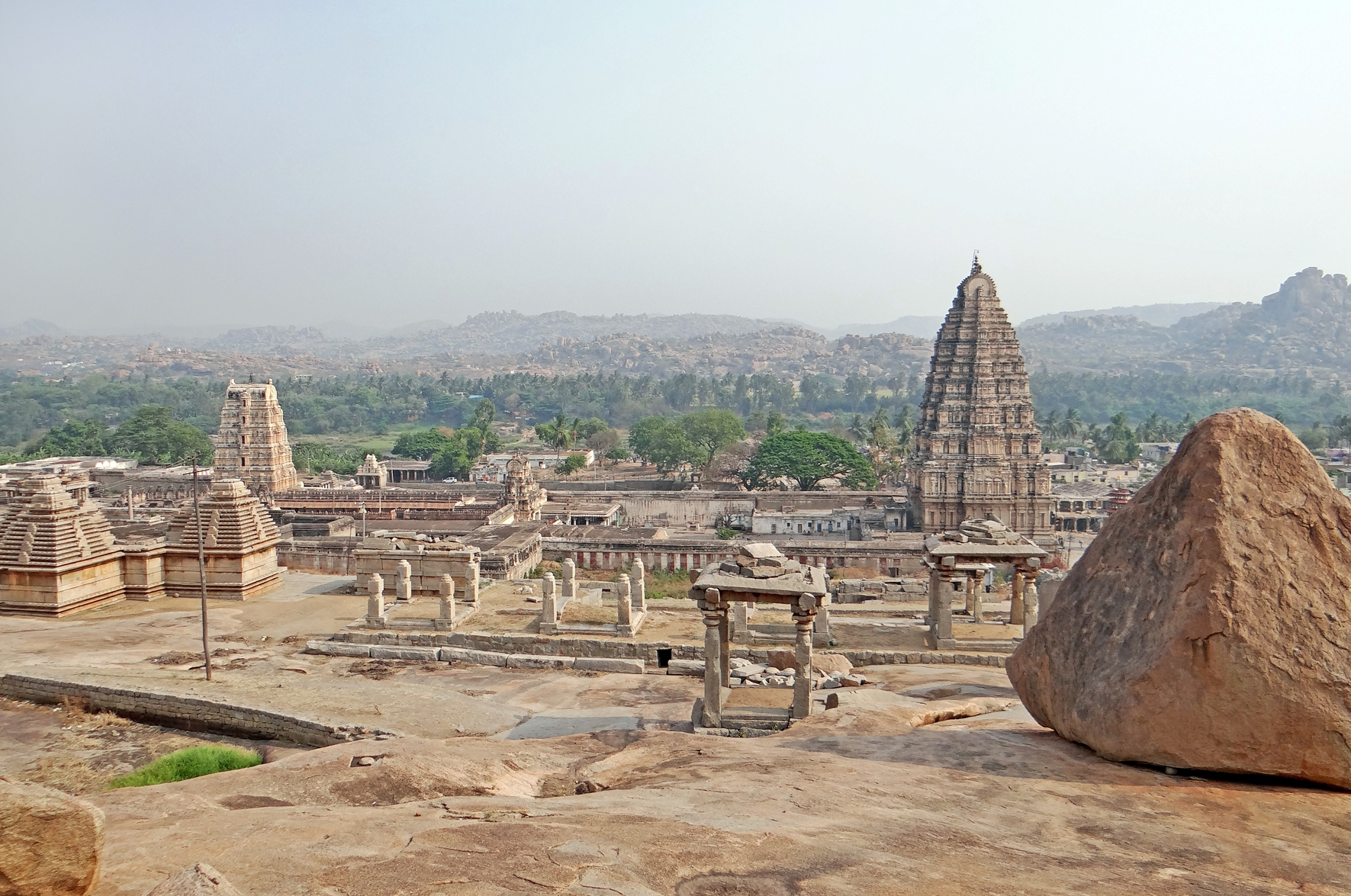
Hampi became the center of Dvaita under Vyasatirtha.

Sharma credits Vyasatirtha of converting Dvaita from an obscure movement to a fully realised school of thought of philosophical and dialectical merit. Through his involvement in various diplomatic missions in the North Karnataka region and his pilgrimages across South India, he disseminated the precepts of Dvaita across the sub-continent. By giving patronage to the wandering bards or Haridasas, he oversaw the percolation of the philosophy into the vernacular and as a result into the lives of the lay people. He also contributed to the spread of Dvaita by establishing 732 Vayu (Note: Madhva along with Hanuman and Bhima are considered to be the avatars of Vayu.) idols across Karnataka. Vyasatirtha is also considered as a major influence on the then burgeoning Chaitanya movement in modern-day Bengal. Chaitanya Mahaprabhu(1486–1534) is said to be a disciple of Isvara Puri who was a disciple of Madhavendra Puri who was a disciple of Lakshmipati Tirtha who was a disciple of Vyasatirtha (1469–1539). Stoker postulates that his polemics against the rival schools of thought also had the effect of securing royal patronage towards Dvaita.

=== Scholarly Influence ===
Vyasatirtha was influenced by his predecessors such as Vishnudasacharya, Jayatirtha and Madhva in that he borrowed from their style and method of enquiry. He exerted considerable influence on his successors. Vadiraja's Yuktimalika derives some of its arguments from Nyayamruta, while subsequent philosophers like Vijayendra Tirtha and Raghavendra Tirtha have authored several commentaries on the works of Vyasatirtha. Vijayadhwaja Tirtha's Padaratnavali, a commentary on the Madhva's Bhagvata Tatparya Nirnaya, borrows some its aspects from Vyasatirtha's oeuvre. His influence outside the Dvaita community is found in the works of Appayya, who adopted his doxographical style in some of his works and in the works of Jiva Goswami.

In his dialectics, Vyasatirtha incorporated elements from such diverse schools as Purva Mimamsa, Vyakarana and Navya Nyaya. His criticism of Advaita and Nyaya led to a severe scholarly controversy, generating a series of exchanges between these schools of thought, and led to reformulations of the philosophical definitions of the respective schools. Bagchi notes "It must be recognised that Vyasatirtha's definition of reasoning and his exposition of its nature and service really register a high watermark in the logical speculations of India and they ought to be accepted as a distinct improvement upon the theories of Nyaya-Vaisesika school".

=== Contributions to the Haridasa Movement ===
The contribution of Vyasatirtha to the Haridasa cult is twofold: he established a forum of interactions for these bards called Dasakuta and he himself penned several hymns in the vernacular language (Kannada) under the pen name Krishna, most notable of those being the classical Carnatic song Krishna Ni Begane Baaro. Vyasatirtha was also the initiator of social change within the Dvaita order by inducting wandering bards into the mainstream Dvaita movement regardless of caste or creed. This is evident in his initiation of Kanaka Dasa , who was not a Brahmin and Purandara Dasa who was a merchant.

=== Political influence ===
The political influence of Vyasatirtha came into view after the discovery of Vyasayogicharita. The court of Vijayanagara was selective in its patronage thereby creating competition between the sectarian groups. Stoker contends that Vyasatirtha, cognizant of the power of Smartha and the Sri Vaishnava Brahmins in the court, targeted them through his polemical works. Though his works targeted the philosophy of Ramanuja, Vyasatirtha maintained a cordial relationship towards the Sri Vaishnavites, often donating land and money to their temples.

In his role as a diplomat, he interacted with a variety of people including tribal leaders, foreign dignitaries and emissaries from the North India. By establishing mathas and shrines across the subcontinent, patronizing large scale irrigation projects at strategic locations and forging productive relationship across various social groups, he not only furthered the reach of Vaishnavism but smoothed the integration of newly conquered or rebellious territories into the empire. In doing so, he exported the Madhva iconography, doctrines and rituals into the Telugu and Tamil speaking regions of the empire. The establishment of Madhva Mathas, apart from serving as a place of worship and community, led to fostering of economic connections as they also served centers of trade and redistribution of wealth. According to a legend, he isconsidered to have taken over the throne of Vijayanagara for two years on behalf of the king.

== Sources ==
- Sharma, B.N.K (2000) [1961]. History of Dvaita school of Vedanta and its Literature. Vol. 2 (3rd ed.). Bombay: Motilal Banarasidass. ISBN 81-208-1575-0.
- Dasgupta, Surendranath (1991). A History of Indian Philosophy, Vol 4. Motilal Banarsidass. ISBN 978-8120804159.
- Jackson, William (2000). Holy People of the World: A Cross-cultural Encyclopaedia. ABC-CLIO. ISBN 978-1-57607-355-1.
- Stoker, Valerie (2016). Polemics and Patronage in the City of Victory. Univ of California Press. ISBN 978-0-520-29183-6.
- Sarma, R. Nagaraja (1937). Reign of realism in Indian philosophy. National Press.
- Sarma, Deepak (2007). Madhvacarya and Vyasatirtha: Biographical sketches of a Systematizer and his Successors. Journal of Vaishnava Studies. pp. 145–168.
- Verghese, Anila (1995). Religious Traditions at Vijayanagara: As Revealed Through Its Monuments. Manohar. pp. 145–168. ISBN 9788173040863.
- Rao, Venkoba (1926). Śrī Vyāsayogicaritam: Life of Śrī Vyāsarāja, a Champū Kāvya in Sanskrit by Somanātha. Bangalore: Dvaita Vedanta Studies and Research Foundation.
- McCrea, Lawrence (2015). Freed by the weight of history: polemic and doxography in sixteenth century Vedānta. South Asian History and Culture, Vol 6. pp. 87–101.
- Williams, Michael (2014). "Mādhva Vedānta at the Turn of the Early Modern Period: Vyāsatīrtha and the Navya-Naiyāyikas". International Journal of Hindu Studies. 18 (2): 119–152. doi:10.1007/s11407-014-9157-7. S2CID 144973134.
- Sewell, Robert (2000) [1900]. A Forgotten Empire (Vijayanagar): A Contribution to the History of India. Asian Educational Services. ISBN 9788120601253.
- Sharma, B.N.K (1961). History of Dvaita school of Vedanta and its Literature. Vol. 1 (1st ed.). Bombay: Motilal Banarasidass.
- Dalmia, Vasudha (2009). The Oxford India Hinduism Reader. Oxford University Press. ISBN 978-0-19-806246-2.
- Sastri, N.S Anantakrishna (1982). Advaitasiddhiḥ. Parimala Pablikeśansa.
- Bagchi, Sitansusekhar (1953). Inductive reasoning: a study of Tarka and its role in Indian logic. Calcutta Oriental Press.
- Rao, M.V. Krishna (1959). A Brief Survey of Mystic Tradition in Religion and Art in Karnataka. Wardha Publishing House.
- Timalsina, Sthaneshwar (2008). Consciousness in Indian Philosophy: The Advaita Doctrine of 'Awareness Only'. Routledge. ISBN 978-1-135-97092-5.
- Potter, Karl H. (1972). Thirtieth Anniversary Commemorative Series: Southeast Asia. University of Arizona Press.
- Sharma, R. K. (1972). International Sanskrit Conference. The Ministry.
- Bhatta, C. Panduranga (1997). Contribution of Karaṇāṭaka to Sanskrit. Institute of Asian Studies.
- Vilas, Bhakti (1964). Sri Chaitanya's Concept of Theistic Vedanta. Sree Gaudiya Math.
- Farooqui, Salma Ahmed (2011). A Comprehensive History of Medieval India: Twelfth to the Mid-Eighteenth Century. Pearson Education India. ISBN 9788131732021.
- Karmarkar, A. P. (1939). Mystic Teachings of the Haridasas of Karnatak. Karnatak Vidyavardhak Sangha.
- Nair, K. Maheshwaran (1990). Advaitasiddhi: A Critical Study. Sri Satguru Publications.
- Lochtefeld, James G. (2002). The Illustrated Encyclopedia of Hinduism. Vol. 2. The Rosen Publishing Group. ISBN 978-0-8239-3180-4.
- Hebbar, B.N (2005). The Sri-Krsna Temple at Udupi: The History and Spiritual Center of the Madhvite Sect of Hinduism. Bharatiya Granth Nikethan. ISBN 81-89211-04-8.
- "Reconstruction of demolished Brindavana of Vyasaraja begins". Hindu. 2019.
- Williams, Michael Thomas (2024). Existence and Perception in Medieval Vedānta: Vyāsatīrtha's Defence of Realism in the Nyāyāmṛta. De Gruyter. doi:10.1515/9783110728521. ISBN 9783110728491.
