= Vidyabhushana =

Singer

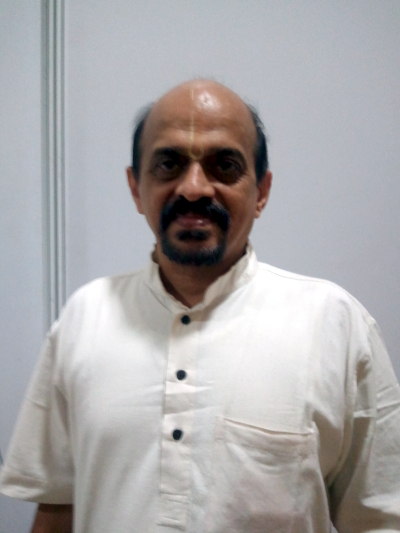
- Born: July 10, 1952 (age 74)
- Occupations: Musician, Singer
- Spouse: Rama

Vidyabhushana is a vocalist from Karnataka. He sings devotional songs, chiefly Haridasa compositions, and carnatic classical music. He has many albums to his credit, mainly devotional songs in Kannada, Tulu and has given concerts all over the world. His first album was titled "Dasara Padagalu" and the 100th titled "Tanu Ninnadu Jivana Ninnadu". Performing for more than 40 years, he has traveled to many countries including a tour across the United States in 1999., He was honoured with the title of Sangeetha Vidya Nidhi in 1994. He was also honoured the Doctorate by Hampi University.

Vidyabhushana began to learn music when he was young, from his father Govindacharya. He lives with his wife Rama and two children in Bangalore. He was the pontiff of Subrahmanya Matha, before becoming a full-time singer. In 1997 he decided to give up the sanyasa and entered into wedlock. He has written his autobiography 'Nenape Sangeetha' (Memory is music) in Kannada language published by Vikram Hathwar of Prakruthi Prakashana.
