= V. Seetharamaiah =

Kannada Poet, writer and professor

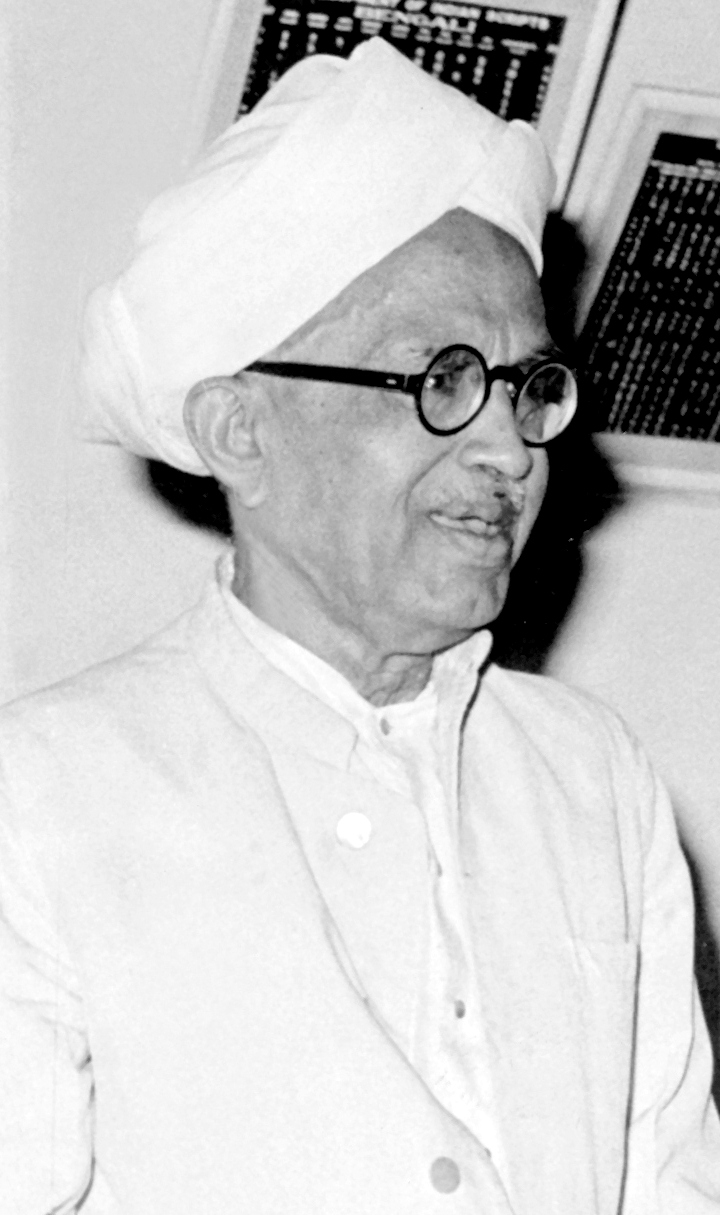
- Born: Venkataramaiah Seetharamaiah; 2 October 1899; Budigere, Devanahalli, Kingdom of Mysore
- Died: 4 September 1983 (aged 83); Bangalore, Karnataka, India
- Education: Maharaja's College, Mysore
- Occupations: Kannada poet; writer; essayist; critic; editor; lecturer
- Writing career
- Pen name: Vee. See.
- Language: Kannada, English
- Notable works: Krishnacharithra, Aralu Baralu, Mahaniyaru, Geetegalu, Deepagalu, Pampa Yatre, College Dinagalu
- Notable awards: Karnataka Sahitya Akademi Award, Sahitya Akademi Award, D. Litt (Doctorate, 1976)
- Literary movement: Navodaya
- Website: V. Seetharamaiah

Venkataramaiah Seetharamaiah (2 October 1899 - 4 September 1983) commonly known as Vee See, was a Kannada poet, writer, essayist, critic, editor and teacher who taught Kannada literature at University of Mysore between 1928 and 1955. He is a recipient of the Karnataka Sahitya Akademi Award (1973), Kendra Sahitya Akademi Award and an Honorary Doctorate (D. Litt) from University of Mysore in 1976. He presided over the 36th Kannada Sahitya Sammelana (Kannada Literary Conference) at Kumta in 1954.

He has authored about sixty works in Kannada with about eight anthologies of poems, thirty-six works of Kannada prose, ten translations from English to Kannada and ten biographical sketches written in English. This corpus of writing spans fifty years of his academic career and includes nearly every conceivable genre and style of writing prevalent in his time. He mainly embodied the Navodaya movement in Kannada literature in the 1950s and 1960s. V. Seetharamaiah was an Economist by education and was trained under the tutelage of N. S. Subba Rao at Maharaja College, Mysore. N. S. Subba Rao studied Economics along with J. M. Keynes at Cambridge University in the early 1920s under the eminent Economist Alfred Marshall.

== Early years ==
Seetharamaiah was born in Budhigere village, Devanahalli, Bangalore, on 2 October 1899. His parents were Venkataramaiah (father) and Doddavenkamma (mother). He spent the first six years of his childhood in Budhigere under the care of his grandparents. His father was a priest officiating various Brahminical rituals at Bangalore, who he lost when he was eight. He was sent to Bangalore to pursue further schooling in 1906. He completed his schooling at Municipal School, Chamarajpet, and then at Anglo-vernacular school. Some notable classmates of his here were K. V. Iyer, T. P. Kailasam and C. S. Venkatachar. After completing his schooling, Seetharamaiah sat for the University of Mysore entrance examination. He has the rare distinction of being in the very first batch of students in the nascent University of Mysore in 1917. Seetharamaiah chose political science, philosophy and economics for his bachelor's degree at the university. His teachers in B. A. included S. Radhakrishnan and M. Hiriyanna. He was awarded the Sir Seshadri Gold Medal in Economics in 1920.

For his master's degree, Seetharamaiah chose economics as his favoured subject. Here he came under the tutelage of Prof. N. S. Subba Rao. Rao was trained in economics at Cambridge University along with his classmate J. M. Keynes under the eminent Economist Alfred Marshall. He would mould Seetharamaiah's interest and aptitude in Economics in a constructive manner. Seetharamaiah remembered memories of his college days at the Maharaja College, Mysore in his memoir College Dinagalu. The Faculty at the Maharaja College, Mysore included J. C. Rollo, B. M. Srikantaiah and Macintosh in Department of English, M. Hiriyanna, S. Radhakrishnan and A. R. Wadia in Department of Philosophy, N. S. Subba Rao (Economics), Kanakanahalli Varadachar and B. Krishnappa in Department of Kannada and the Principal of the college was C. R. Reddy.

After completing his M. A. in 1922, Seetharamaiah embarked for Bombay where he joined a course in Law (L.L.B.). Owing to a bout of malarial fever, he soon gave up the Law course and returned to Mysore. He would later reminisce his days in Bombay in his book Mumbayivāsa in 1976.

== Academic ==
Seetharamaiah returned to Mysore in 1923 and took up a teaching tenure at Sarada Vilas High School till 1928. During these years, Vi. Si. began to pen poems in Kannada. These he would publish extensively in journals and periodicals like Prabuddha Karnataka, Aruna, Rashtra Bandhu and Artha Sadaka. B. M. Srikantaiah, who was the Registrar of University of Mysore appointed V. Seetharamaiah as lecturer in 1928 at Central College, Bangalore. Even though Vi. Si. was trained in Economics, B. M. Srikantaiah reposed faith in his grasp and knowledge of Kannada language and literature and appointed him as a Kannada lecturer instead. V. Seetharamaiah taught at Central College and Intermediate Colleges at Bangalore till 1942. At Central College, Bangalore he was a member of the "Karnataka Sangha" - a band of Kannada literary enthusiasts who would pen poems, write novellas and often even stage them in amateur theatres in Bangalore.

In 1943, V. Seetharamaiah was promoted and transferred back to Maharaja College, Mysore. Here he worked till 1948. For the next two years, he would head the Intermediate College at Chikamagalur first as Superintendent and then as Principal. From 1950 till 1955 (until his retirement), he headed the Department of Kannada Studies at Central College, Bangalore.

His students were B. G. L. Swamy, R. K. Laxman, A. K. Ramanujan, H. Y. Sharada Prasad, S. V. Parameshwara Bhatta, H. M. Nayak, G. S. Shivarudrappa, L. S. Sheshagiri Rao, H. M. Shankar Narayan Rao, J. Varadaraja Rao and Smt. C. N. Mangala.

After retirement, from 1956 till 1958, Vi. Si. worked with All India Radio - Bangalore Akashvani as producer for the "Spoken Word Professor" series. From 1964 till 1968, V. Seetharamaiah headed Malnad Progressive Society's Arts and Science First Grade College at Honnavar, Karnataka as Principal. In 1968, he returned to Bangalore to assume Editorship of India Book House's (IBH) encyclopaedic project aimed at compiling all of Kannada poetry from Kaviraja Nayakara (Nrupatunga) to Navodaya’s Muddanna. This vast work was successfully brought out by Vi. Si. under the title of “Kannada Kavi Kavya Parampare”.

== Works ==
V. Seetharamaiah published his first poem as well his first work of prose (Pampa Yatra) in "Prabhuddha Karnataka" in 1922. A. R. Krishnashastry as Editor of this journal was instrumental in encouraging Vi. Si. to contribute consistently. It was A. R. Krishnashastry who shortened V. Seetharamaiah to Vi. Si. - this became his pen name going forth. He has authored about sixty works in Kannada with about eight anthologies of poems, thirty-six works of Kannada prose, ten translations from English to Kannada and ten biographical sketches written in English.

=== List of works ===
==== Anthology of Kannada Poems ====
- “Geetegalu” (1931) – 67 poems
- “Deepagalu” (1933) – 16 poems
- “Nelalu-Belaku” (1935)
- “Drakshi-Dalimbe” (1948)
- “Hejjepadu” (1959)
- “Kadamba” (1970)
- “Aralu-Baralu” (1972) – Kendra Sahitya Akademi Award (1973)
- “Hagalu-Iralu” (1981)

==== Works of Kannada Prose ====
- “Pampa Yatre” (1927)
- “Sohrab Rustom” (1930)
- “Agraha” (1931)
- “Hana Prapancha” (1937)
- “Karnataka Kadambari” (1940)
- “Bharatagala Sri Krishna” (1940) – Kumaravyasa Prashasthi
- “Abhijnana Shakuntala Nataka Vimarshe” (1943)
- “Ashwathaman” (1946)
- “Bharatada Rajyanga Rachane” (1947)
- “Vyavahara Dharma” (1949)
- “Bharatada Aivaru Manyaru” (1951)
- “Kavi Kavya Drishti” (1955)
- “Shivarama Karantharu” (1956)
- “Beladingalu” (1959)
- “Sri Shaila Shikara” (1960)
- “Sahitya Vimarshegalalli Artha mathu Moulya” (1961)
- “Bharatadalli Yojane” (1962)
- “Sahitya: Sampradaya mathu Hosa Marga” (1967)
- “Seekarane” (1970)
- “Chyavana” (1970)
- “Mahaniyaru” (1970)
- “College Dinagalu” (1971)
- “Eradu Nataka: Chyavana mathu Agraha” (1971)
- “Satya mathu Moulya” (1972)
- “Valmiki Ramayana” (1976)
- “Kalanubhava” (1976)
- “Olleya Manushya, Olleya Baduku” (1976)
- “Mumbaivasa: Nenapugalu” (1976)
- “Mahakavi Pampa” (1976)
- “Mahabharata Krishnacharithra” (1978)
- “Pattabandha” (1979)
- “Sahityalokana” (1979)
- “Sarvajanika Jeevanadalli Adhikara, Shakthi, Prabhava Mandalagalu” (1979)
- “Hiriyaru Geleyaru” (1980)
- “Samvidhana mathu Kanunu” (1992)
- “Sahityaloka (Part II)” (unpublished)

==== Works in English ====
- “Mahakavi Pampa” (1967)
- “K. Venkatappa” (1968)
- “Purandaradasa” (1971)
- “M. Visveswaraiah” (1971)
- “Valmiki Ramayana” (1972)
- “D. V. Gundappa” (1972)
- “Panje Mangesha Rao” (1978)
- “Abhijnana Shakuntala Nataka Vimarshe” (unpublished)
- “Mahabharatada Krishnacharithra” (unpublished)
- “Manyaru” (unpublished)

==== Translations ====
- “Reserve Bank of India” (1959)
- “Bharata Swatantraya Galisithu” (1963)
- “Pygmalion” (1963)
- “Bangali Sahitya Charithre” (1966)
- “Major Barbara” (1968)
- “Thyagaraja” (1969)
- “Purandara Dasa” (1979)
- “Moby Dick” (1982)
- “Panje Mangesha Rao” (1985)
- “Mission with Mountbatten” (unpublished)

==== Collected works ====
- “Sneha Vishwasa” (1990)
- “Novu Nalivu” (1990) (unpublished 59 works)
- “Samagra Lalitha Prabhandha Samputa” (1992)
- “Samagra Nataka” (1993)
- “Vyakthi Chitra Samputa” (Part I and II) (1993)
- “Smrithi chitra Samputa” (1997)
- “Vimarshe Samputa – I – History & Poetry” (1998)
- “Vimarshe Samputa – II – Poetry & Drama” (1998)

== Recognition ==
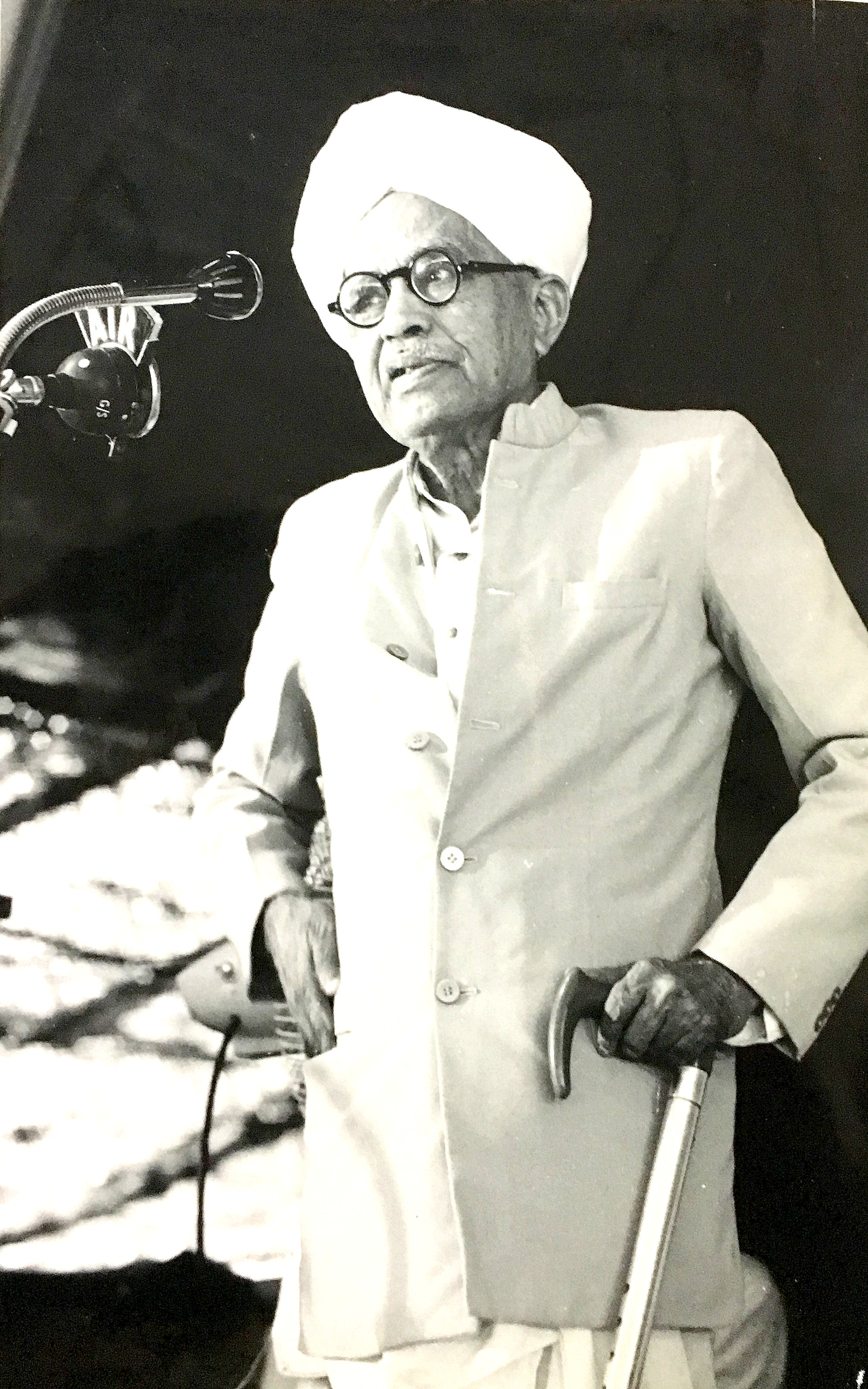
V. Seetharamaiah delivering the inaugural address at Kannada Sahitya Sammelana at Kumta (1954).jpg

V. Seetharamaiah chaired the Poetry division of the 17th Kannada Sahitya Sammelana at Karwar. He presided over the 36th Kannada Sahitya Sammelana at Kumta in 1954 (see photo). He chaired the “Mumbai Prantha Bhasha Conference” held at Gadag. Vi. Si. was an honorary member of “P. E. N. Kendra Sahitya Akademi Prashasthi Committee” as well as the “Jnanapeeta Prashasthi Committee”. His collection of character sketches “Mahaniyaru” and descriptive essay “Krishnacharithra” won him the Rajya Sahitya Akademi award. His anthology of poems “Aralu Baralu” received the Kendra Sahitya Akademi Award. Festschrift volumes “Rooparadhaka”, “Vi. Si.” and “Vi. Si. – 75” were presented to him in recognition of a lifetime contribution to Kannada Language and Literature. His alma mater University of Mysore conferred on him an Honorary Doctorate (D.Litt.) in 1976.

== Later years ==
V. Seetharamaiah travelled widely in India and visited Rabindranath Tagore's Shantiniketan. On his visit to London, he suffered a debilitating stroke and he was hospitalised for nearly a fortnight in Britain. Vi Si. was married to Sarojamma. Many of his books are prescribed curricula both at University of Mysore and Bangalore University. V. Seetharamaiah died on 4 September 1983 at Bangalore aged 83 years. His numerous Kannada poems and works of prose remain popular in Karnataka. The noted Psychologist and Sanskrit scholar S. K. Ramachandra Rao described Vi. Si.'s writing thus:

When I read Homer, I feel as if I were twenty feet high” said Edmé Bouchardon - the sculptor who lived about two hundred years ago. Homer’s description of Gods, Demons are of a gigantic scale. Readers are given this impression of immensity that is awe inspiring. Such is the power of description in Homer’s writings. I find Vi. Si.’s writings in a similar vein and he not only ascends to great heights, he also takes us with him to give us a panoramic perspective from his beautiful vantage point. Such is his scope and depth of writing

== Bibliography ==
- M. Ramachandra (2006). "V. Seetharamaiah" (ವಿ. ಸೀತಾರಾಮಯ್ಯ) - Biography - Kannada Book; 1st Edition (Beṅgaḷūru: Navakarnāṭaka Prakāśana);
- L. S. Seshagiri Rao (1999). ವಿ. ಸೀ. - ನೂರರ ನೆನಪು (1 ed.). Vi. Sī. Sampada, Vi. Sī. Saṃsmaraṇa Vēdike;
- P. V. Joshi, G. S. Shivarudrappa, Shivaram Karanth (1991). ವಿ. ಸೀ. - ವ್ಯಕ್ತಿತ್ವ, ಕಾವ್ಯ ವೈಶಿಷ್ಟ್ಯ (2 ed.). Bangalore: ವಿ. ಸೀ. ಸಂಪದ.
- G. Venkatasubbiah. ವಿ. ಸೀ. (Biographical Sketch for Karnataka Sahitya Academy). Bangalore; Govt. of Karnataka.
- Govt. of Karnataka. Catalogue of works by V. Seetharamaiah - Karnataka Sahitya Academy;
- Govt. of Karnataka. List of Important Dates in the life of V. Seetharamaiah - Karnataka Sahitya Academy;
- Vi. Sītārāmayya; Venkat Madhurao Inamdar (1975). Vi. Sī.- 75: Sambhāvanā Grantha. Vi. Sī. Satkāra Samitigāgi; Ai. Bi. Ec. Prakāśana.
