= Mettupatti Yamunacharya =

Professor of Philosophy, Writer, Gandhian and Editor of Gandhi's works (1890–1970)

M. Yamunacharya
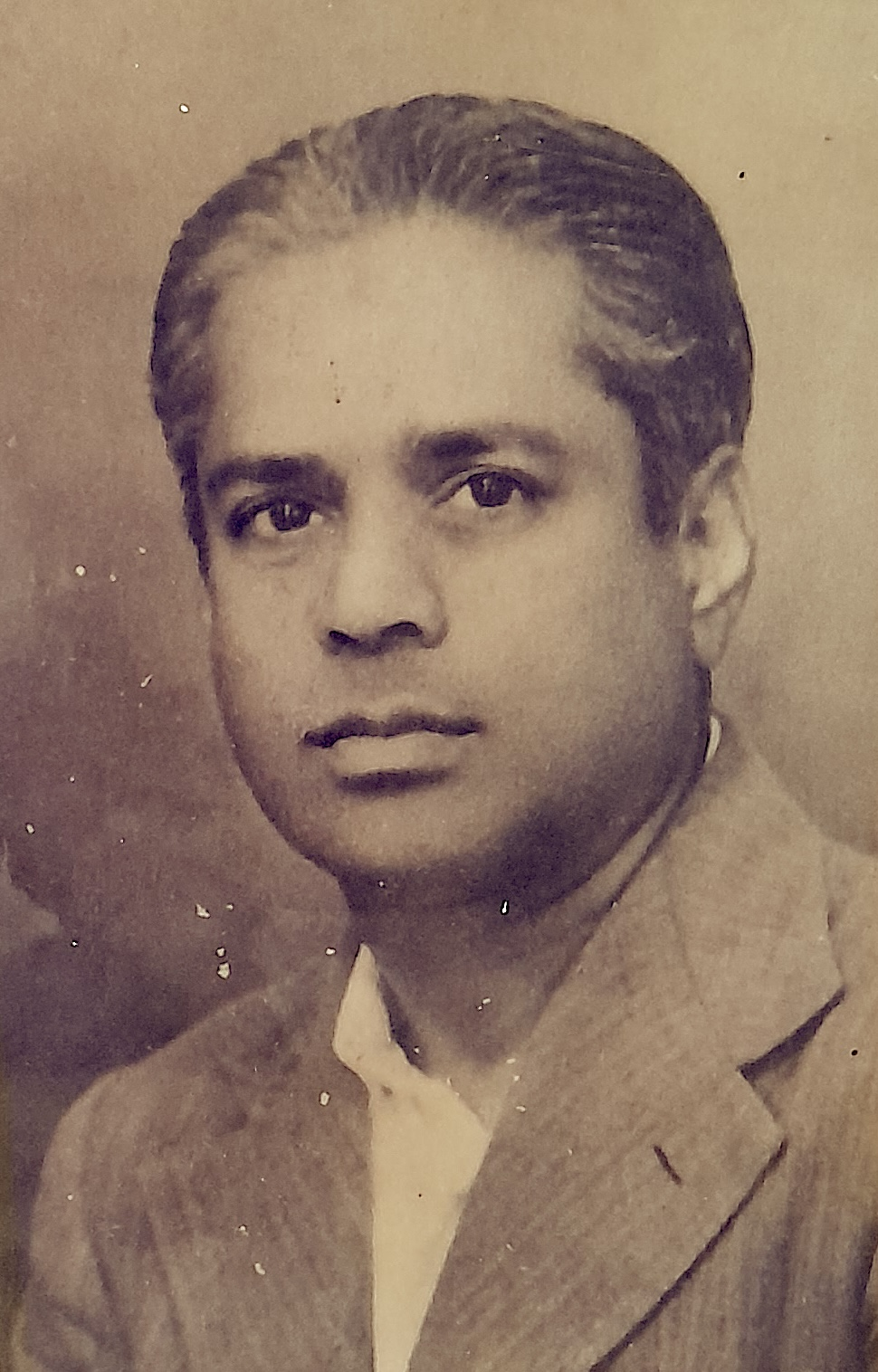
- Born: 30 September 1889; Mysore, Kingdom of Mysore, British India
- Died: 4 January 1970 (aged 80); Mysore, India
- Education: Maharaja College, Mysore
- Occupations: Philosophy Professor; Teacher; Writer; Translator; Editor; Gandhian
- Spouse: Rajamma
- Children: 8 Children
- Relatives: Alkondavalli Govindacharya Swamy, Natakashiromani A. V. Varadachar
- Writing career
- Pen name: M. Yamunacharya
- Language: Kannada, Tamil, Sanskrit, English
- Period: 1930–70
- Notable works: Vishistadvaita Darshana, Ramanuja's Teachings in his own words, Alwarugalu, Acharya Ramanujaru, Paschatya Rajakeeya Tatwagalu
- Notable awards: Karnataka Rajyotsava Award (in Education) – 1969
- Website: M. Yamunacharya

Mettupatti Yamunacharya (30 September 1889 – 4 January 1970) was a Writer, Editor, Translator, Gandhian and a Professor of Philosophy at Maharaja College, Mysore., He edited Kannada translations of all of Mahatma Gandhi's works spanning nearly 10,000 pages across eight volumes. He was an authority on the 10th-century saint Ramunajacharya and the Hindu Philosophical school of Vishistadvaita. M. Yamunacharya was awarded the Karnataka Rajyotsava Award (in Education) for his work "Vishistadvaita Darshana" in 1969. Noted Kannada Novelist and Philosopher S. L. Bhyrappa had his tutelage under M. Yamunacharya at Maharaja College, Mysore, in Philosophy. Jayachamarajendra Wodeyar sought and later acknowledged M. Yamunacharya's valuable contributions in bringing forth his book "Dattatreya: The Way and The Goal". Yamunacharya's works on Ramanujacharya and Tarka (Logic) are seminal in Indian Philosophy. He was a student of Sarvepalli Radhakrishnan, M. Hiriyanna, A. R. Wadia and K. T. Shah at University of Mysore between 1921 – 23.

== Origins ==
M. Yamunacharya was born on 30 September 1889 in Mysore, Karnataka to parents Narayana Iyengar and Manikyamma. His grandfather Alkondavalli Govindacharya Swamy held the post of Executive Engineer in the erstwhile Mysore State under Dewan Seshadri Iyer and was a contemporary of A. R. Wadia, M. Hiriyanna, K. T. Shah and Sarvepalli Radhakrishnan at the nascent University of Mysore. The family were ardent followers of Saint Ramanujacharya and the Hindu Philosophical school of Vishistadvaita and hailed from Mettupatti, near Salem, Tamilnadu.

== Education ==
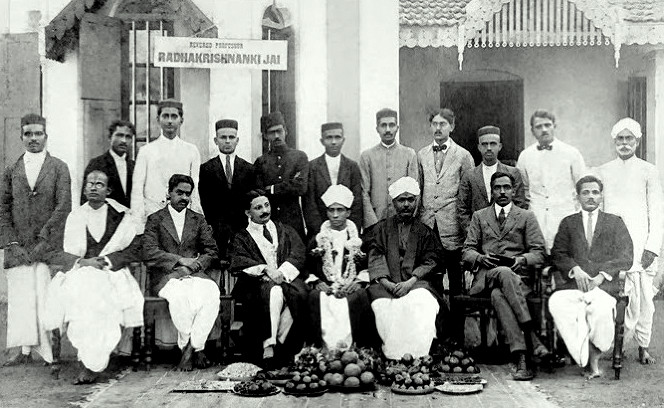
Farewell from Maharaja College, Mysore for S. Radhakrishnan (also seen are M. Hiriyanna and K. T. Shah)

M. Yamunacharya had his early schooling at Marimallappa High School, Mysore, under prominent educationist, social reformer and philanthropist M. Venkatakrishnaiah (known also as Mysore Thathayya). He completed his M.A. in Philosophy under the tutelage of M. Hiriyanna, Sarvepalli Radhakrishnan, A. R. Wadia and K. T. Shah at Maharaja College, Mysore in 1923.

== Academician ==
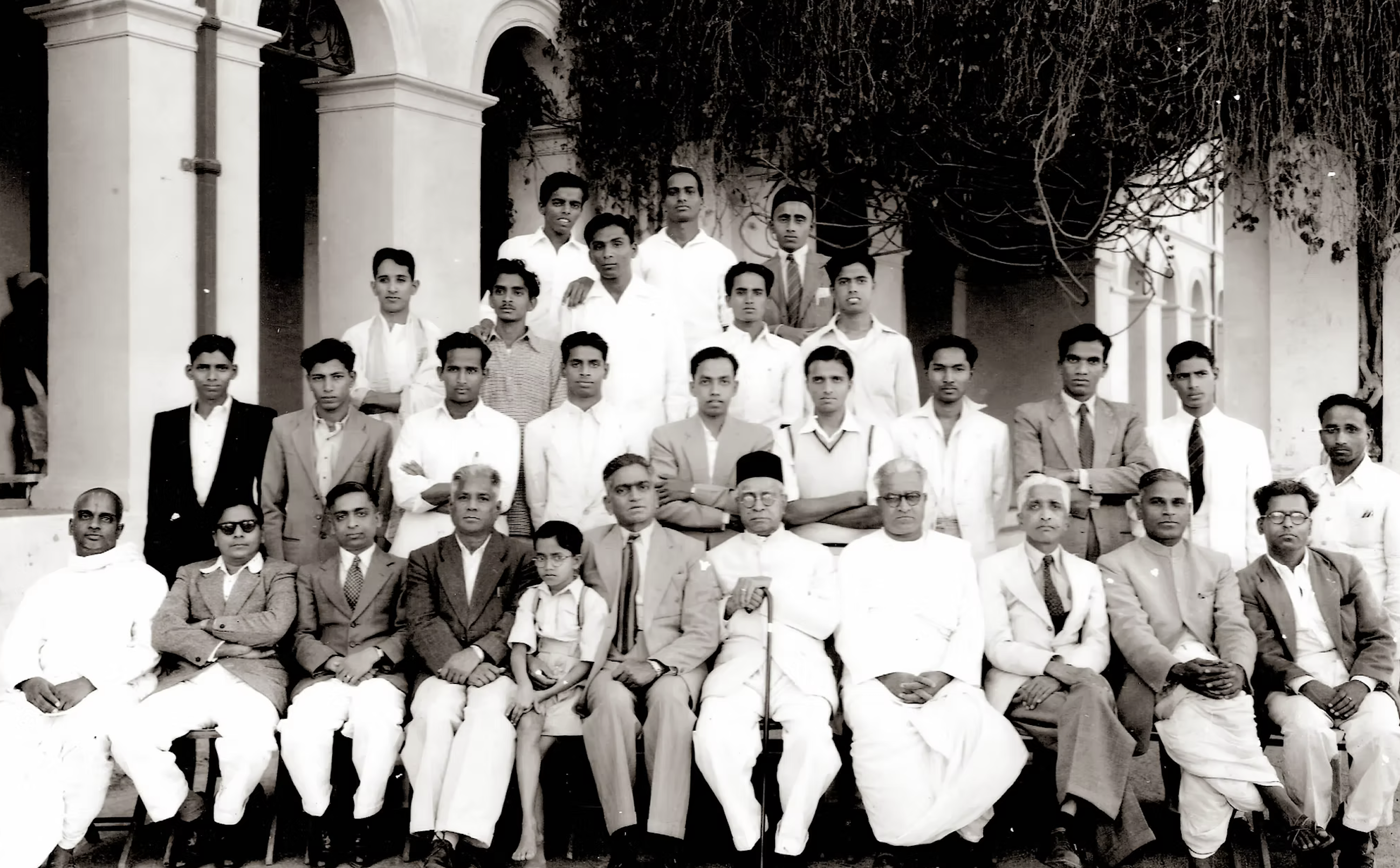
Maharaja College Mysore Group Photo (1946): Sitting on chairs (L-R): ?, ?, ?, M. Yamunacharya, Purushottam, K. A. Nilakanta Sastri, ?, ?, ?, ?, ?

M. Yamunacharya began his teaching career at Collegiate High School, Tumkur. From here, he was transferred to Intermediate College, Hassan, as Principal. After this, he spent nearly a decade teaching Tarka (English: Logic) in Indian Philosophy at Bangalore. He was transferred to Mysore in 1951 and continued teaching Philosophy at Maharaja College till his retirement in 1956. M. Yamunacharya helped many scholars and doctoral students with their research. Prominent among these were S. L. Bhyrappa and the American author John. C. Plott, who sought help for his PhD on Ramanujacharya. After his retirement from Maharaja College, Mysore, he was invited as Honorary Professor at Government Ayurvedic Medical College, Mysore to teach Darshanas. Yamunacharya became Emeritus Professor in Philosophy under University Grants Commission, New Delhi in 1968.

== Works ==
=== Books and articles ===
- Ramanuja's Teachings in his own words (1970)
- An Introduction to Logic & Scientific Method
- Acharya Ramanujaru
- Alwarugalu
- Paschatya Rajakeeya Tatwagalu
- Deeper Meaning of Yagna in Indian Religious Thought (1949)[QJMS, Vol.39 – 1]
- Matha Dharma Tattva Shastra (1969)
- Tarka Shastra Sangraha
- The Concept of Maya as Avidya
- The Hindu Theory of International Relations as Expounded in Kamandaka's Nitisara – (The Indian Journal of Political Science, 3)
- Geeta Bhashya
- Shree Bhashya
- Logic
- Studies in Philosophy
- Religion and Literature
- Mary and S.K. George souvenir (1959–1960)

=== Translations ===
- Matha Dharma Punarjeevana (Kannada translation of Dr Sarvepalli Radhakrishnan's 'Revival of Faith')
- Manushyana Mannassu (Kannada translation of Dr G. D. Boaz's 'Know Your Mind')
- Kannada translation of Thoreau's Biography
- Kannadadalli Gandhi Granthamale

=== Editorial work ===
- Samaja Vignana Sangraha
- Aadhunika Tattvashastra Sangraha (1957)

=== Doctoral thesis (as guide) ===
- The Nature and Destiny of the Individual in the Philosophy of Lokacharya

== Gandhian ==
Yamunacharya was made Chief Editor of the Committee entrusted with translating into Kannada language, all of Mahatma Gandhi's works (spanning close to 10,000 pages across eight volumes) in 1956, by R. R. Diwakar. All of these translated volumes were brought forth in Kannada as "Kannadadalli Gandhi Granthamale". The Committee was based at Gandhi Smaraka Nidhi, Mysore and consisted of Gorur Ramaswamy Iyengar, G. P. Rajarathnam, Sampatgiri Rao, Kanvi, Narayanamurthy, K. S. Narayanaswamy and Kuvempu. M. Yamunacharya was the first Director of Gandhi Bhavan (Centre for Gandhi Studies) at University of Mysore, from 1965 to 1966. From 1967 onwards, he was associated with Gandhi Peace Foundation, New Delhi.

== Recognition ==
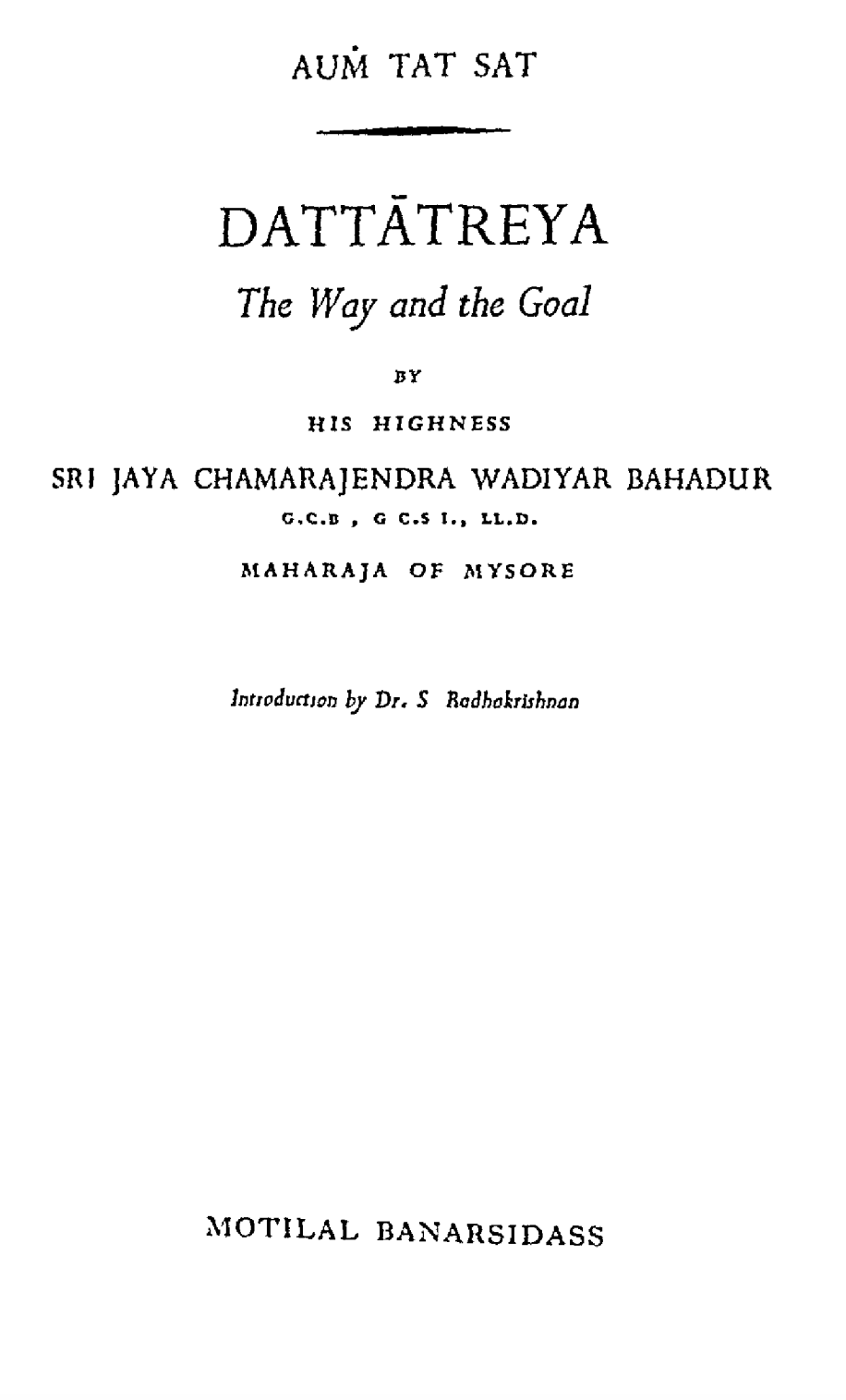
Cover Page of Jayachamarajendra Wodeyar's Book on Lord Dattatreya "Dattatreya – The Way and The Goal" (1957)

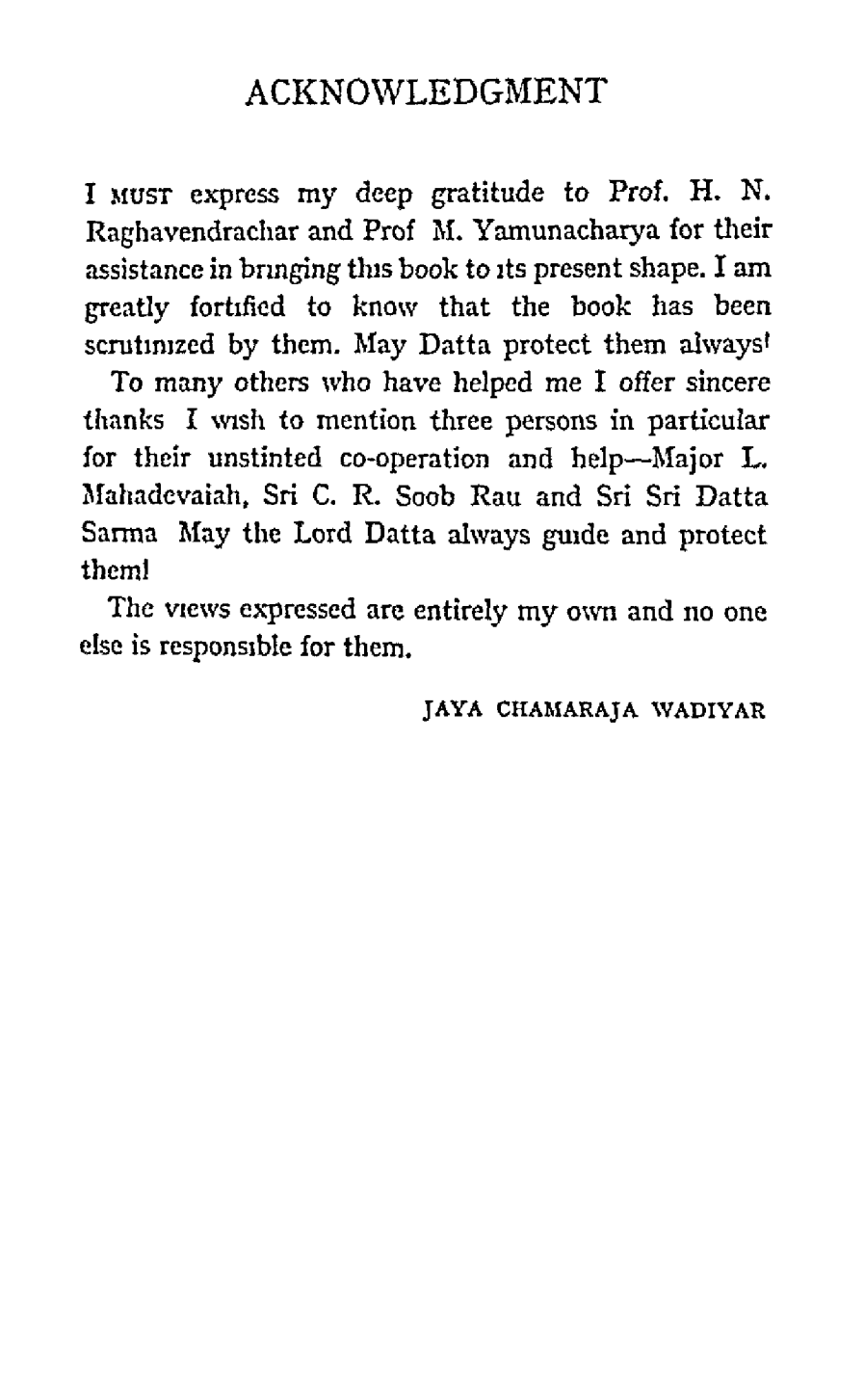
'Dattatreya – The Way And The Goal' by HH Jayachamarajendra Wodeyar (1957) (Tribute by HH Jayachamarajendra Wodeyar to M. Yamunacharya and H. N. Raghavendrachar)

Yamunacharya chaired the 'Joint Symposium on Indian Educational Values (BHU & NCERT)' at New Delhi in 1966. He was a regular invitee at All India Radio (Akashvani) studios, where he either delivered lectures or took part in interviews on a host of philosophical topics. M. Yamunacharya helped many a scholar in their academic research. The renowned American author John. C. Plott came to Yamunacharya seeking guidance for his PhD on Ramanujacharya. His later, more popularly remembered work "Global History of Philosophy", also has a dedication to Yamunacharya in its Index. Similarly, the former Maharaja of Mysore, Jayachamarajendra Wodeyar, in his seminal work on Lord Dattatreya, titled "Dattatreya: The Way and the Goal" (Allen & Unwin, London, 1957) gives a heartfelt tribute to M. Yamunacharya (along with H. N. Raghavendrachar) for guiding him in the writing of the book. M. Yamunacharya was invited to Rashtrapathi Bhavan, New Delhi to meet then President of India, Zakir Hussain in connection with his work at Gandhi Peace Foundation, New Delhi in 1967. After his retirement, M. Yamunacharya was made Emeritus Professor in Philosophy by UGC (University Grants Commission), New Delhi in 1968. 'Karnataka Rajyotsava Award' (for Education) for the year 1969 was presented to M. Yamunacharya, by then Chief Minister of Karnataka Veerendra Patil, in recognition of his work "Vishistadvaita Darshana".

== Personal life ==
M. Yamuancharya married Rajamma and had eight children. From 1966 onwards, he had suffered cardiac ailments and had admissions both at All India Institute of Medical Sciences, New Delhi as well as K. R. Hospital, Mysore. M. Yamunacharya died on 4 January 1970 at Mysore, aged 80 years.

== Bibliography ==
- Pranamapushpam (2013) – Book Released on the occasion of "One Day National Seminar on Contributions of Prof. M. Yamunacharya to Philosophy"
- Studies in Philosophy, Religion & Literature – Prof M. Yamunacharya Memorial Trust, Bengaluru
- Bhitti (1996) – Bhyrappa, S. L.
- Maharaja's College Centenary Commemoration Volume
- Encyclopedia of Indian Philosophies – Bibliography · Volume 1 (1995)
- The Conception of Punishment in Early Indian Literature - by Terence Day (2006)
- AKASHVANI - Vol. XXXI, No. 5 ( 30 JANUARY, 1966 ) - By All India Radio (AIR), New Delhi · 1966
- Radhakrishnan - His Life and Ideas - by K. Satchidananda Murty, Ashok Vohra (1990)
- The Charles Strong Lectures, 1972-1984 (1987)
- The Poona Orientalist - Volumes 17-21 (1952)
- Advaita and Viśiṣṭādvaita – A Study Based on Vedānta Deśikā's Śatadūṣaṇī – by S. M. Srinivasa Chari (1999)
- R. G. Collingwood: A Research Companion - by James Connelly, Peter Johnson, Stephen Leach (2014)
- Political Thinkers of Modern India: M.K. Gandhi - by Verinder Grover (1990)
- SRI BASAVESHWARA by Prof. L. S. Seshagiri Rao (2012)
- Sri Varadarajaswami Temple, Kanchi: A Study of Its History, Art and Architecture by K.V. Raman (2003)
- Struggle All the Way - Story of a Book Seller by D. R. Krishna Murthy (1992)
- Global History of Philosophy – John. C. Plott; Edition:[1st ed. reprint]; Publisher: Motilal Banarsidass, Delhi, 1987
- Sarva—Darśana—Sangraha; A Bibliographical Guide to the Global History of Philosophy
- Dattātreya; the way and the goal. Introd. by S. Radhakrishnan
- Dattātrēyulu:Mārgamu Mariyu Gamyamu by HH Jaya Chamaraja Wadiyar
- The Imperial Discipline – Race and the Founding of International Relations by Alexander E Davis, Vineet Thakur, Peter Vale · 2020
- The Fundamental Principles of Āyurveda – Volumes 1–3; by C. Dwarakanath · 1998
- Aryan Path – Volume 32 (1961)
- Mahatma Gandhi – Insight and Impact by Dev Banshlal Ramnauth · 1989
- Proceedings and Transactions of the Indian Oriental Conference Volume 18, Part 1955 – 1958
- Gandhiji in Indian Literature by University of Mysore. Institute of Kannada Studies · 1971
