= Kannada Sahitya Sammelana =

Annual Kannada literature conference

- Genre: Kannada literature
- Frequency: 1 year
- Location: Various
- Years active: 111
- Inaugurated: 1915
- Most recent: December 2024 in Mandya
- Next event: 2025 in Ballari
- Patron: Karnataka Government
- Website: kasapa.in/sahithyasammelana.htm

The Kannada Sahitya Sammelana (lit. 'Kannada Literature Conference') is the premier gathering of writers, poets and Kannadigas. It is held with the aim of preserving and developing the Kannada language, its literature, art, culture and music. It was started in 1915 by H. V. Nanjundaiah and held at Bangalore. It used to be inaugurated by prominent writers and poets from 1915 to 1948. Since then it has been inaugurated by the Chief Minister of Karnataka. The Kannada Sahitya Parishat is responsible for holding the gathering.

== Recently held ==
The 87th Kannada Sahitya Sammelana held in Mandya in December 2024 was the recent event. After 30 years of gap, Mandya got the opportunity for the third time with Go. Ru. Channabasappa presiding the chair.

== List of conferences ==
No.	Date	Place	President	Ref.
1st	3–6 May 1915	Bangalore	H. V. Nanjundaiah	
2nd	6–8 May 1916	Bangalore	H. V. Nanjundaiah	
3rd	8–10 June 1917	Mysore	H. V. Nanjundaiah	
4th	11–13 May 1918	Dharwad	R. Narasimhachar	
5th	6–8 May 1919	Hassan	Karpur Srinivasa Rao	
6th	20–21 June 1920	Hospet	Rodda Srinivasa Rao	
7th	19–21 May 1921	Chikmagalur	K. P. Puttanna Chetty	
8th	12–13 May 1922	Davanagere	M. Venkatakrishnaiah	
9th	21–23 May 1923	Bijapur	Siddhanti Shivashankara Shastry	
10th	16–18 May 1924	Kolar	H. Krishna Sastri	
11th	9–11 May 1925	Belgaum	Benegal Rama Rau	
12th	22–24 May 1926	Ballari	Phakirappa Gurubasappa Halakatti	
13th	19–21 May 1927	Mangalore	R. Thathacharya	
14th	1–3 June 1928	Kalaburagi	B. M. Srikantaiah	
15th	12–14 May 1929	Belgaum	Masti Venkatesha Iyengar	
16th	5–7 October 1930	Mysore	Aluru Venkata Rao	
17th	28–30 December 1931	Karwar	Muliya Timmappaiah	
18th	28–30 December 1932	Madikeri	D. V. Gundappa	
19th	29–31 December 1933	Hubli	Y. Nagesha Shashtry	
20th	28–30 December 1934	Raichur	Panje Mangesh Rao	
21st	26–28 December 1935	Mumbai	N. S. Subbarao	
22nd	29–31 December 1937	Jamkhandi	Bellave Venkatanaranappa	
23rd	29–31 December 1938	Bellary	R. R. Diwakar	
24th	25–28 December 1939	Belgaum	Mudaveedu Krishnarao	
25th	27–29 December 1940	Dharwad	Y. Chandrashekhara Shastry	
26th	27–29 December 1941	Hyderabad	A. R. Krishnashastry	
27th	26–28 January 1943	Shimoga	D. R. Bendre	
28th	28–30 December 1944	Rabakavi	S. S. Basavanala	
29th	26–28 December 1945	Madras	T. P. Kailasam	
30th	7–9 May 1947	Harapanahalli	C. K. Venkataramaiah	
31st	29–31 December 1948	Kasaragod	T. T. Sharma	
32nd	5–7 March 1949	Kalaburagi	Channappa Uttangi	
33rd	24–26 May 1950	Sollapur	M. R. Srinivasamurthy	
34th	26–28 December 1951	Mumbai	M. Govinda Pai	
35th	16–18 May 1952	Belur	S. C. Nandimata	
36th	26–28 December 1954	Kumta	V. Seetharamaiah	
37th	10–12 June 1955	Mysore	K. Shivaram Karanth	
38th	25–27 December 1956	Raichur	Sriranga	
39th	7–9 May 1957	Dharwad	Kuvempu	
40th	18–20 January 1958	Ballari	V. K. Gokak	
41st	11–13 February 1960	Bidar	D. L. Narasimhachar	
42nd	27–29 December 1960	Manipal	A. N. Krishna Rao	
43rd	27–29 December 1961	Gadag	K. G. Kundanagara	
44th	28–30 December 1963	Siddaganga	R. S. Mugali	
45th	10–12 May 1965	Karwar	Kadengodlu Shankara Bhat	
46th	26–28 May 1967	Shravanabelagola	A. N. Upadhye	
47th	27–29 December 1970	Bangalore	Javare Gowda	
48th	31 May–2 June 1971	Mandya	Jayadevi Taayi Ligade	
49th	11–13 December 1976	Shimoga	S. V. Ranganna	
50th	23–25 April 1978	Delhi	G. P. Rajarathnam	
51st	9–11 March 1979	Dharmasthala	Gopalakrishna Adiga	
52nd	7–10 February 1980	Belgaum	Basavaraj Kattimani	
53rd	13–15 March 1981	Chikmagalur	P. T. Narasimhachar	
54th	27–30 November 1981	Madikeri	Shankara Bala Dixit Joshi	
55th	23–26 December 1982	Sirsi	Gorur Ramaswamy Iyengar	
56th	23–25 March 1984	Kaivara	A. N. Murthy Rao	
57th	3–6 April 1985	Bidar	H. M. Nayak	
58th	29 October–1 November 1987	Kalaburagi	Siddaiah Puranik	
59th	16–18 February 1990	Hubli	R. C. Hiremath	
60th	28–30 November 1990	Mysore	K. S. Narasimhaswamy	
61st	9–12 January 1992	Davanagere	G. S. Shivarudrappa	
62nd	5–7 February 1993	Koppala	Simpi Linganna	
63rd	11–13 February 1994	Mandya	Chaduranga	
64th	3–5 June 1995	Mudhol	H. L. Nagegowda	
65th	21–24 December 1996	Hassan	Chennaveera Kanavi	
66th	11–14 December 1997	Mangalore	Kayyar Kinhanna Rai	
67th	11–14 February 1999	Kanakapura	S. L. Bhyrappa	
68th	24–26 June 2000	Bagalkote	Shantadevi Malavada	
69th	15–17 February 2002	Tumkur	U. R. Ananthamurthy	
70th	7–9 March 2003	Belgaum	Patil Puttappa	
71st	18–21 December 2003	Moodabidri	Kamala Hampana	
72nd	27–29 January 2006	Bidar	Shantharasa	
73rd	20–23 December 2007	Shimoga	K. S. Nissar Ahmed	
74th	12–15 December 2008	Udupi	L. S. Sheshagiri Rao	
75th	4–6 February 2009	Chitradurga	L. Basavaraju	
76th	19–21 February 2010	Gadaga	Geetha Nagabhushan	
77th	4–6 February 2011	Bangalore	G. Venkatasubbaiah	
78th	9–11 December 2011	Gangavati	C. P. Krishnakumar	
79th	9–11 February 2013	Bijapur	Ko Channabasappa	
80th	7–9 January 2014	Kodagu	Na D'Souza	
81st	31 January–3 February 2015	Shravanabelagola	Siddalingaiah	
82nd	2–4 December 2016	Raichur	Baraguru Ramachandrappa	
83rd	24–26 November 2017	Mysore	Chandrashekhar Patil	
84th	4–6 January 2019	Dharwad	Chandrashekhara Kambara	
85th	5–7 February 2020	Kalaburagi	H. S. Venkateshamurthy	
86th	23–25 January 2023	Haveri	Doddarangegowda	
87th	20–22 December 2024	Mandya	Go. Ru. Channabasappa	
88th	December 2025	Ballari	Banu Mushtaq (announced)	

== See also ==
- Kannada Sahitya Parishat
