= M. Hiriyanna =

Indian philosopher

Mysore Hiriyanna
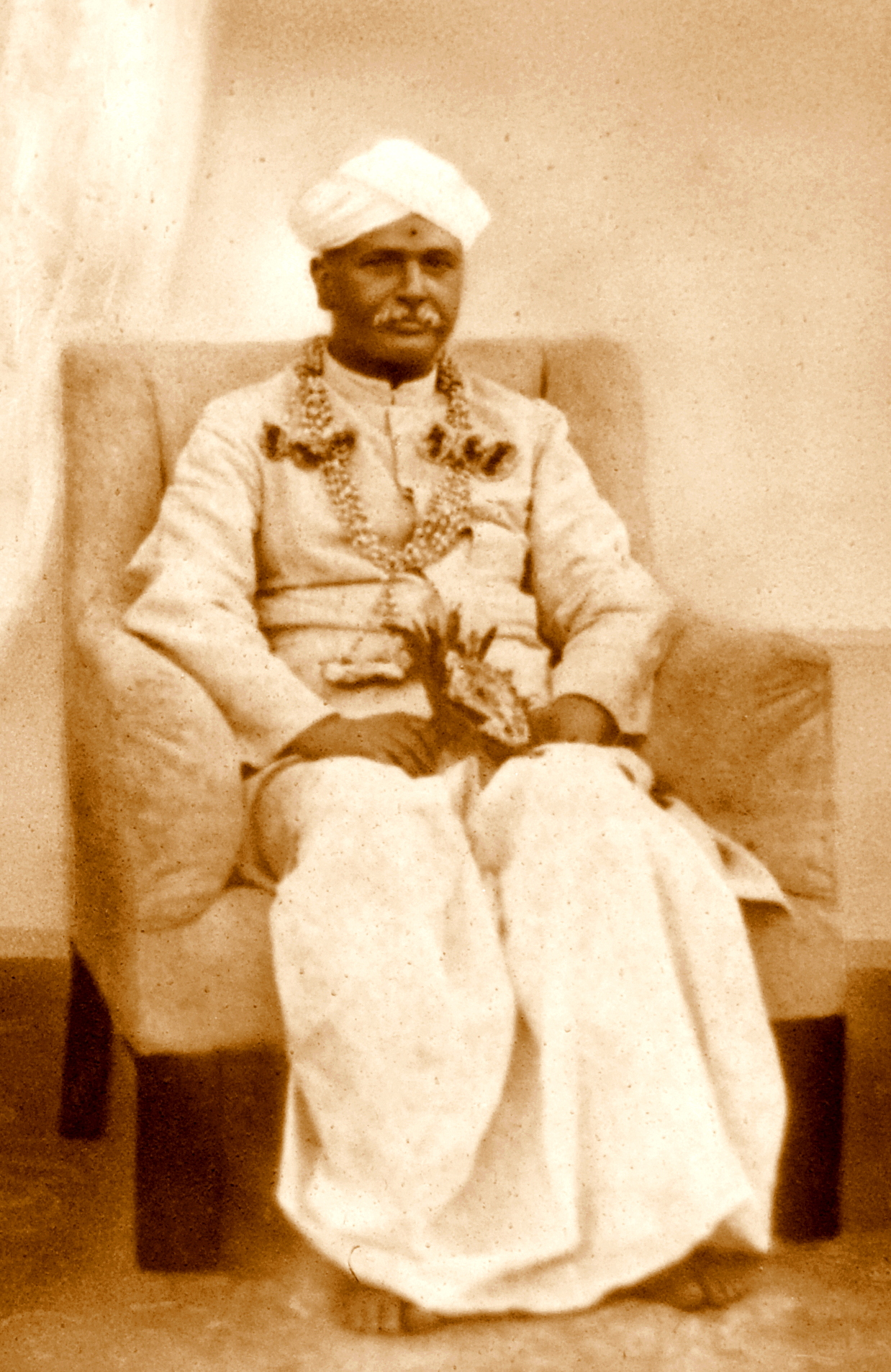
- Born: 7 May 1871; Mysore
- Died: 19 September 1950 (aged 79); Mysore

Education
- Education: Madras Christian College
- Academic advisors: Perisamy Tirumalacharya, Kashi Sesharamasastry, Asthan Vidwan Kaviratna Mandikallu Ramasastri, Kasturi Ranga-Iyengar, A. R. Wadia

Philosophical work
- Era: 20th-century philosophy
- Region: Indian philosophy
- School: Advaita
- Institutions: University of Mysore
- Notable students: M. V. Seetharamiah, P. T. Narasimhachar, V. Seetharamaiah
- Main interests: Aesthetics; Vedanta; Ethics; Perfection
- Notable ideas: Art experience is transient Conception of Nirgunabrahman as the Ultimate Reality with the implied belief in the Maya Doctrine

Mysore Hiriyanna (1871–1950) was an eminent Indian philosopher, Sanskrit scholar and authority on Indian aesthetics. He was a Professor of Sanskrit at the University of Mysore and a contemporary of Sarvepalli Radhakrishnan. His classes on Indian Philosophy were comprehensive. His classroom dictations, published by Allen & Unwin in book form as "Outlines of Indian Philosophy" brought Hiriyanna international recognition. This was a seminal work on Indian Philosophy. His other prominent works include "Indian Conception of Values", "Essentials of Indian Philosophy", "The Quest after Perfection" and "Art Experience". He wrote extensively on the Vedic age, mainly on the Upanishads, followed by the evolution of Indian philosophical thought in the post-vedic era, deliberating mainly on Bhagavad Gita, the early years of Buddhism and Jainism. His work on aesthetics was authoritative and dealt mainly with Alamkaras, Aesthetics and Ethics, Method of Art, Indian Aesthetic Values and Art & Morality.

== Early years and teaching career ==
Hiriyanna was born in Mysore on May 7, 1871. His parents were M. Nanjundaiah and Lakshmidevi. He had his preliminary schooling in Mysore, where he learnt Sanskrit from Perisamy Tirumalacharya and Kashi Sesharamasastry. He obtained his Bachelor of Arts (B.A.) and Master of Arts (M.A.) qualifications from the Madras Christian College, Madras. His first job was as librarian at the Mysore Oriental Library (now, the Oriental Research Institute, Mysore) which he joined in 1891. He was instrumental here in curating 1653 printed works and 1358 manuscripts – many of them in ancient Sanskrit and Kannada. He would again visit Madras to secure a Licentiate in Teaching (L.T.) qualification, thus enabling him to teach in academic institutions. Upon his return to Mysore, he joined the Government Normal School as a teacher in 1896 and eventually became a Head-Master by 1907.

Upon recommendation from the first Vice Chancellor of the University of Mysore – H. V. Nanjundaiah, Hiriyanna was appointed as Lecturer in Sanskrit at Maharaja College, Mysore in 1912. He was promoted to the post of Assistant Professor of Sanskrit by 1914. Here, he came in contact with A. R. Wadia – who was heading the Department of Philosophy at Maharaja College, Mysore. S. Radhakrishnan was also on the faculty of this department at this time. The two scholars shared an in-depth interest in the study of Indian and Western Philosophies. In fact, it was S. Radhakrishnan who suggested publishers Allen & Unwin to publish in book form the class-room notes of M. Hiriyanna, which ultimately came out as "Outlines of Indian Philosophy". M. Hiriyanna, along with A. R. Wadia and Sarvepalli Radhakrishnan groomed M. Yamunacharya, who would later hold post of Professor in Philosophy in the Department of Philosophy at Maharaja College, Mysore.

M. Hiriyanna was made Professor of Sanskrit Studies at Maharaja College, Mysore by 1919. He held Professorship for the next eight years and retired from the University of Mysore in 1927. His illustrious teaching career spanned more than two decades.

== Personal life ==
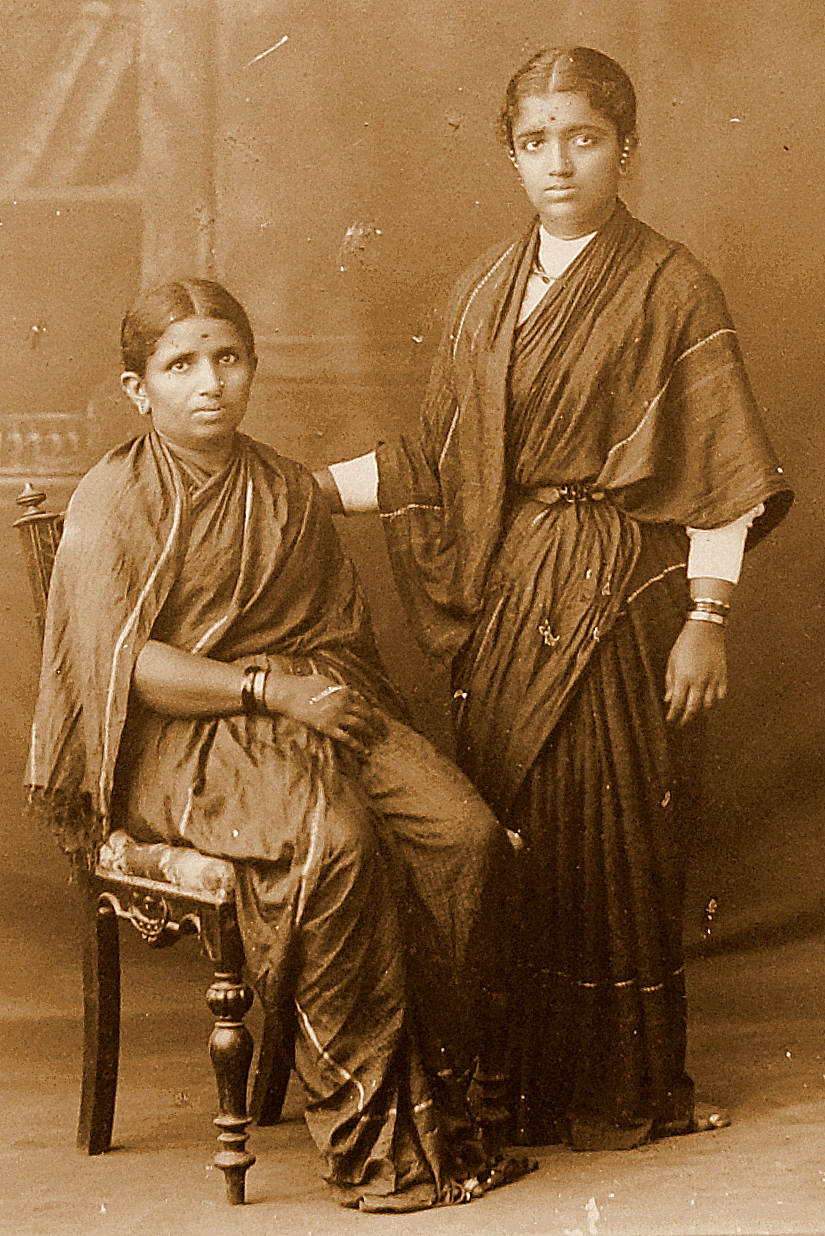
L-R: M. Hiriyanna's wife Lakshmidevamma and daughter Rukkamma

M. Hiriyanna led a life of frugality. He was married to Lakshmidevamma at a young age. They had a daughter by name Rukkamma. Hiriyanna was an introvert by nature and spent days on end studying at his house in Mysore. Post retirement, he declined many an invitation from universities across India to chair their Departments of Philosophy and Sanskrit Studies. His love of English literature was well known and he was an avid reader of " The Times Literary Supplement" and "Illustrated London News".

Hiriyanna had a close relationship with Palghat Narayan Sastry in Mysore and the two scholars deliberated deeply on the finer aspects on Indian philosophical Thought, Vedanta and The Upanishads. Hiriyanna was also in correspondence with the eminent Sanskrit scholar – Kuppuswamy Sastry at Madras. Upon M. Hiriyanna's demise, his vast collection of books was donated to the “Kuppuswamy Sastri Research Institute” at Mylapore.

== Scholarship ==
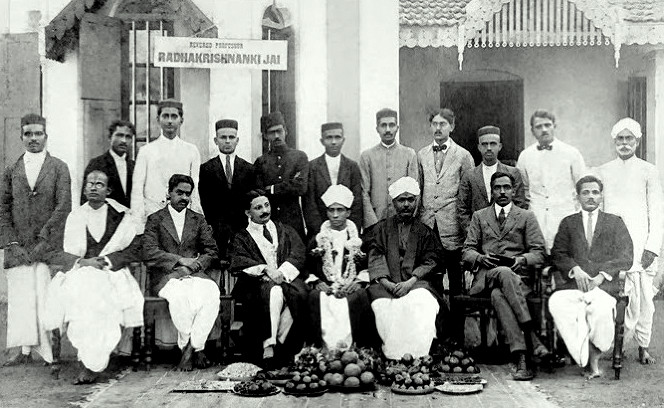
M. Hiriyanna with S. Radhakrishnan and A. R. Wadia at S. Radhakrishnan's Farewell from University of Mysore

Hiriyanna wrote extensively across five decades on topics ranging from the 'Art of Teaching' [Bodhana Krama – 1906] to his treatises on “Ishavasyopanishad” (1911), “Kenopanishad” (1912), “Katakopanishad” (1915) and “Brhadaranyakopansihad – Part 1” in 1919. His interests included Sanskrit language (linguistics), Sanskrit prose and poetry, comparative grammar, Vedic and post-Vedic philosophical thought in India and different schools of philosophies – namely Charavaka Materialism, Buddhist School of Philosophy, Nyaya-Vaisesika, Sankhya-Yoga, Purva-Mimamsa and Vedantic Schools – Advaita, Visistadvaita and Dvaita, Indian Aesthetics, Dhvani Theory and Study of Art. His years with Sarvepalli Radhakrishnan and Ardeshir Ruttonji Wadia at the University of Mysore saw him interpolate, compare and elucidate finer points of Western Philosophy in relation to accepted notions on Indian philosophical thought.

Hiriyanna presided over the All India Oriental Conference held in Mysore in 1935. In 1939, he was requested to chair the All India Philosophy Conference at Hyderabad. In 1940, he delivered the prestigious Miller's Memorial Lecture on Philosophy at Madras. Hiriyanna made sterling contributions to the world of Sanskrit. In recognition of this, the Madras Sanskrit Academy conferred him with the title of "Samskrutasevadhurina" the same year.

Hiriyanna's contributions to comparative philology, Sahitya (Literature), Alamkara (Figures of Speech) and Vyakarana (Grammar) and several Darshanas were credible. He was undeniably the earliest to translate Bhasa's "Svapnavasavadattam" to English, which he titled "The Dream Queen". His works on Advaita are authoritative and his "Naishkarmya-siddhi" and "Vedanta-sara" are examples to this. His "Ishta-siddhi" is without doubt his finest piece on the Advaitic school of thought.

His grasp of the Western philosophical doctrines is brilliantly clear in his "Mission of Philosophy" (1960) where he discusses at great length Immanuel Kant's ideas on "Duty", "Ideal of Perfection", "Moral Good vs. Non-Moral Good", "Promotion of Oneself" and "Rectification of the Will". He had of course, made a comparative study of Socrates and Plato.

Hiriyanna's foreword to V. Raghavan's "The Number of Rasas" gives one a glimpse of his grasp of the "Rasa Theory" and his perspectives on "Alamkara Shastra". This is clearly expounded in his article titled "Art Experience" published in "The Aryan Path" in 1941.

== Writings ==
M. Hiriyanna wrote at a prolific pace. Many of his works did not see publication until years after his death. His English translation of the Upanishads was the beginning of what would become three decades of tireless toil. Many of his papers which he presented at various Oriental Conferences would in themselves qualify as works of considerable value. His works on Indian aesthetics form the bedrock of modern Indian writings and perspectives on that subject. His writings combined an authoritative command on the Sanskrit language with a philosopher's viewpoint on matters of ethereal and metaphysical importance.

=== List of works ===
- Hiriyanna, M – Bhasha Prabodhini
- Hiriyanna, M – Bodhana Krama (1907)
- Hiriyanna, M – Ishavasyopanishad (1911)
- Hiriyanna. M – Kenopanishad (1912)
- Hiriyanna, M – Katakopanishad (1915)
- Hiriyanna, M – Brhadaranyakopansihad – Part 1 (1919)
- Hiriyanna, M – Indian aesthetics (1919) – First Oriental Conference
- Hiriyanna, M – The Ethics of the Upaniṣads (1924)
- Hiriyanna, M – Naishkarmya-siddhi – Sureshwaracharya (1925)
- Hiriyanna, M – Vedanta-sara – Sadananda (1929)
- Hiriyanna, M – Ishta-siddhi – Vimukthathman (1933)
- Hiriyanna, M – Outlines of Indian Philosophy (1932)
- Hiriyanna, M – The Two-Fold Way of Life (1935) – Eighth Oriental Conference – Presidential Address
- Hiriyanna, M – The Essentials of Indian Philosophy (1949)
- Hiriyanna, M – The Quest for Perfection (1952)
- Hiriyanna, M – Popular Essays in Indian philosophy (1952)
- Hiriyanna, M – Art Experience (1954)
- Hiriyanna, M – Sanskrit Studies (1954)
- Hiriyanna, M – Indian Philosophical Studies – I (1957)
- Hiriyanna, M – Indian Philosophical Studies – II (1972)
- Hiriyanna, M – The Mission of Philosophy (1960)
- Hiriyanna, M – Reviews (1970)
- Hiriyanna, M – Indian Conception of Values (1975)

== Legacy ==
In the study of Indian philosophy, Mysore Hiriyanna's contribution is significant. His works find place even today in libraries around the world. His translation of the Upanishads are some of the finest ever done. His erudition and contribution to the world of Sanskrit Language and Literary Studies earned him the title of "Samskrutasevadhurina" from the Madras Sanskrit Academy. He was made President of the All India Oriental Conference held in Mysore in 1935. He was additionally requested to preside over the All India Philosophy Conference at Hyderabad in 1939. He delivered the prestigious Miller's Memorial Lecture on Philosophy at Madras in 1940. His vast library of books collected and carefully curated find place in Kuppuswami Sastri Research Institute at Chennai. His students and contemporaries brought out a Felicitation Volume in his honour in 1952 titled "Prof M. Hiriyanna Felicitation Volume". To mark his birth centenary (1871-1971), a birth centenary commemoration volume was brought out in 1972. Both these volumes contain some scholarly articles on topics dear to Hiriyanna's forte, as written by luminaries like P. T. Narasimhachar and M. V. Seetharamiah among others. A generation of writers, scholars, linguists and of course philosophers in India and abroad remember him for his erudition, dedication to teaching, nobility of spirit and simplicity.

P. T. Narasimhachar's description of his teacher is as follows:

Guru Hiriyanna was a Sthitaprajna in every sense of the term. He exhibited the quality of the well-bred gentlemen – an abhijatapurusa – one who gives his gifts in such a way that none except the donor knows it, who knows how to welcome whoever comes to his house and make him comfortable, who is silent about his own good deeds but proclaims unreservedly of favours he has received from others, in whom fortune does not breed arrogance – who is averse to listen to stories about others and who is intensely devoted to learning. To me, Guru Hiriyanna is an ideal Indian, rooted in his own culture; he did not allow Western thought and culture to destroy the identity as an Indian. He digested them and assimilated into his system all the best of the West, its Philosophy and Literature. It is good to remember Prof. Hiriyanna, his life, his scholarship, his un-ostentatious benevolence, his dignified bearing and his keen sense of honour and independence.

In 2018, Prekshaa Pratishtana in collaboration with W.I.S.E. Words Inc. republished Prof. Hiriyanna's anthologies under the title The Mysore Hiriyanna Library.

== Bibliography ==
- "M. Hiriyanna – The Builders of Indian Philosophy Series" by T. P. Ramachandran, Munshi Manoharlal Publishers, New Delhi (2001).
- "Indian Philosophy in English: From Renaissance to Independence" by Nalini Bhushan; Jay L. Garfield; Oxford University Press, USA (2011).
- "Time in Indian Philosophy, A Collection of Essays" by H. S. Prasad, Sri Satguru Publications, Delhi (1992).
- "The Philosophy of Religion and Advaita Vedanta: A Comparative Study in Religion and Reason" by Arvind Sharma; Pennsylvania State University Press (1995).
- "The Upanishads: Selections from the 108 Upanishads" by T. M. P. Mahadevan; Madras: G.A. Natesan (1950).
- "Contemporary Indian Philosophy" by S. Radhakrishnan & John H. Muirhead; London: G. Allen & Unwin (1952).
- "Prof. M. Hiriyanna Commemoration Volume" by N. Sivarama Sastry & G. Hanumantha Rao; Mysore (1952).
- "Professor M. Hiriyanna Birth Centenary Commemoration Volume, (1871-1971)" by V. Raghavan & G. Marulasiddaiah; Mysore (1972).
- "The Late Professor M. Hiriyanna" by H. L. Hariyappa (Nécrologie); Annals of the Bhandarkar Oriental Research Institute, Vol. 31, pp. 335–336, No. 1/4 (1950).
- "Seminar on Professor M. Hiriyanna: His Life and Works" by G. Marulasiddaiah, R. S. Sivaganesamurti; University of Mysore, Mysore Orientalist Series – Vol 5 (1974).
- The Best of Hiriyanna (with an introductory essay by Shatavadhani Dr. R. Ganesh) Prekshaa Pratishtana, Bangalore (2018).
