= Rangannana Kanasina Dinagalu =

- Author: M. R. Srinivasamurthy
- Language: Kannada
- Subject: Education, Society
- Genre: Fiction
- Published: 2001 Ankita Pustaka, Bengaluru
- Publication place: India
- Media type: Print (Hardcover)
- Pages: 223
- ISBN: 8187321636

Rangannana Kanasina Dinagalu is a book written by M. R. Srinivasamurthy. The title means "The dreamy days of Ranganna". The books is about an idealistic village school inspector. The novel is light and humorous, exploring the educational system of rural India and social interactions of the local leaders.

The story revolves around Ranganna, a schoolteacher promoted to become an inspector of education system. After visiting a number of schools in the interior parts of his area of appointment, Ranganna realizes that the inspector's job is not as easy as his friend had led him to believe. His measures to educate the teachers and improve the working of schools earn him the love and respect of teachers and the wrath of local political leaders.

The play "Sahebara Sarkeetu..." is based on the book.
