= Karnataka Sahitya Academy Award =

Karnataka Sahitya Academy Award ಕರ್ನಾಟಕ ಸಾಹಿತ್ಯ ಅಕಾಡೆಮಿ ಪ್ರಶಸ್ತಿಗಳು
- Literary awards for contributions to Kannada literature
- Awarded for: Literary awards for writers in Kannada language
- Sponsored by: Government of Karnataka
- First award: 1983
- Final award: 2025

Karnataka Sahitya Academy Award was an annual literary award given to literary works in Kannada by the Karnataka Sahitya Academy. Karnataka Sahitya Academy Award is given to individual books published in various genres including poetry, novel, short fiction, criticism, travel writing, translation, children's writing etc., as well as for the complete contribution of a writer to Kannada literature.

Instituted in 1983, it has been given to some of the most eminent writers in Kannada including P. Lankesh, U. R. Ananthamurthy, K. P. Poornachandra Tejaswi, B. T. Lalitha Naik, Niranjana, Jayanta Kaikini and K. Y. Narayanaswamy.

== Awards ==
=== Annual honorary award ===
Year	Recipient
1965	• Chandrashekara Shastry • B. Puttaswamayya • D. R. Bendre • K. Shivaram Karanth
1966	• P. T. Narasimhachar • B. Shivamurthy Shastry • Y. Nagesh Shastry • S. C. Nandimath • T. N. Srikantaiah
1967	• Shamba Joshi • D. L. Narasimhachar • M. Mariyappa Bhatta
1968	• Jayadevi Thayi Ligade • Thirumale Rajamma • G. P. Rajarathnam • A. N. Krishna Rao • D. K. Bhimasena Rao • Saali Ramachandra Rao • Simpi Linganna • Basavaraj Kattimani
2020	• Amrutha Someshwara • Shanmukhayya Akkurmata • K. Kempegowda • K. R. Sandhya Reddy • Ashokapuram K. Govindaraju
2025	• Shivaramaiah • Chandrashekhar Talya • Chandrakant Pokale • Vasundhara Bhupathi • S. Tukaram

=== Sahityashree Award ===
Year	Recipient
2020	• Premashekhar • Rajappa Dalavayi • B. T. Jahnavi • Kalyanarao G. Patil • G. P. Doddamani • Mrityunjaya Rumale • D. V. Prahlad • M. S. Ashadevi • Shivananda Kalave • Veena Bannanje
2025	• Nishti Rudrappa • Veeresh Badiger • C. G. Lakshmipathi • Kannadiga Narayana • Roopa Hasan • Jayaram Raipur • Kumuda Sushil • O. Nagaraju • Jyothi

=== Book prizes ===
The following is a partial list of award winners and the name of the books for which they won.

=== Novel ===
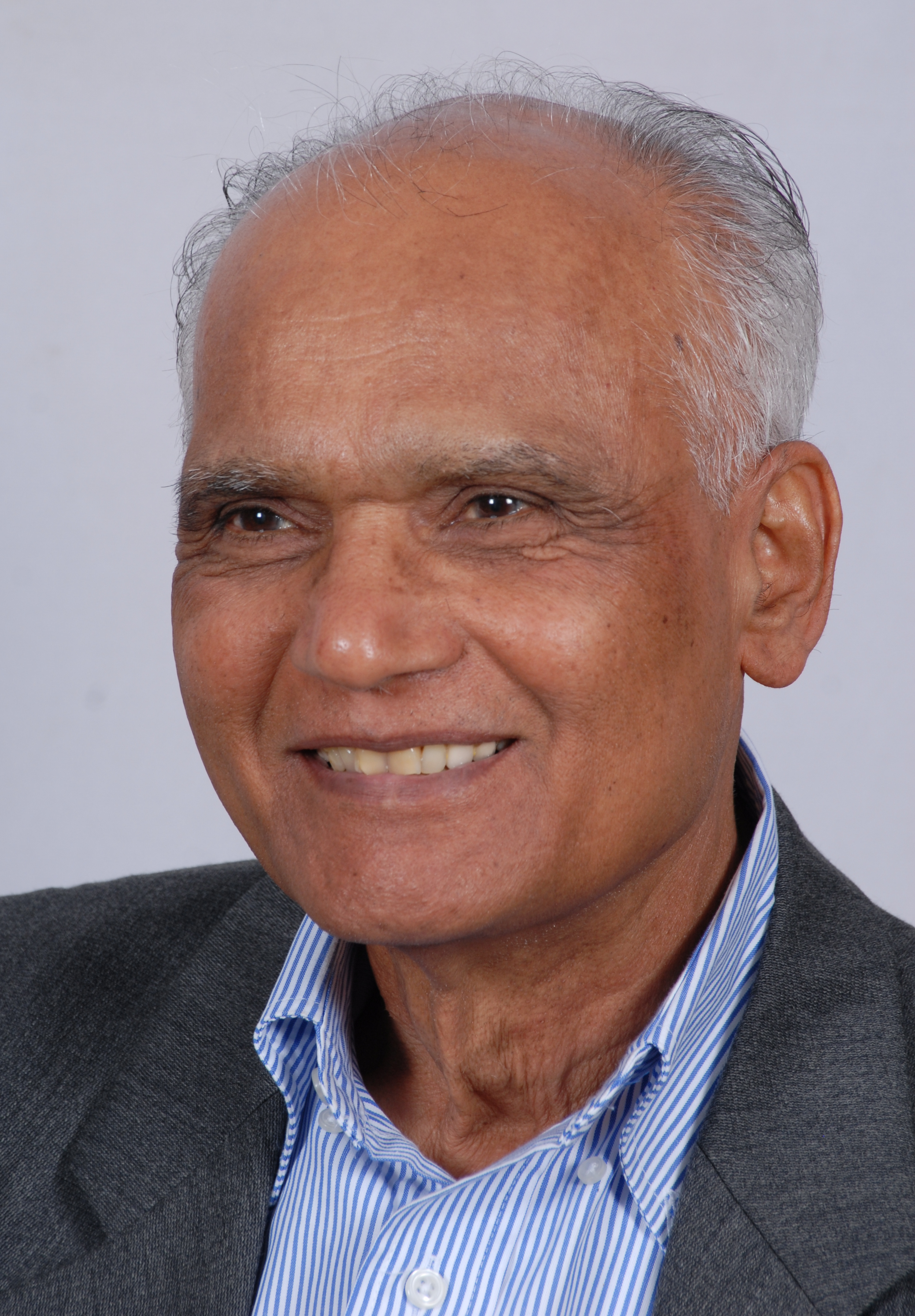
S.L.Bhyrappa

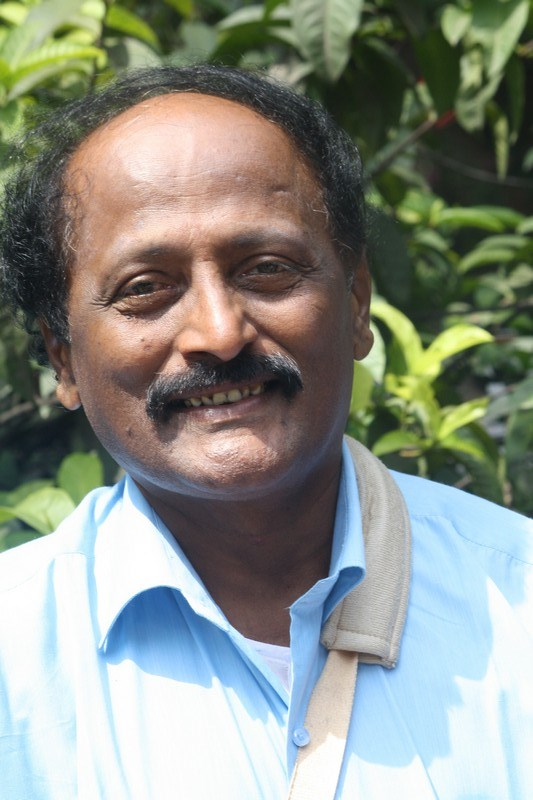
Kum.Veerabhadrappa

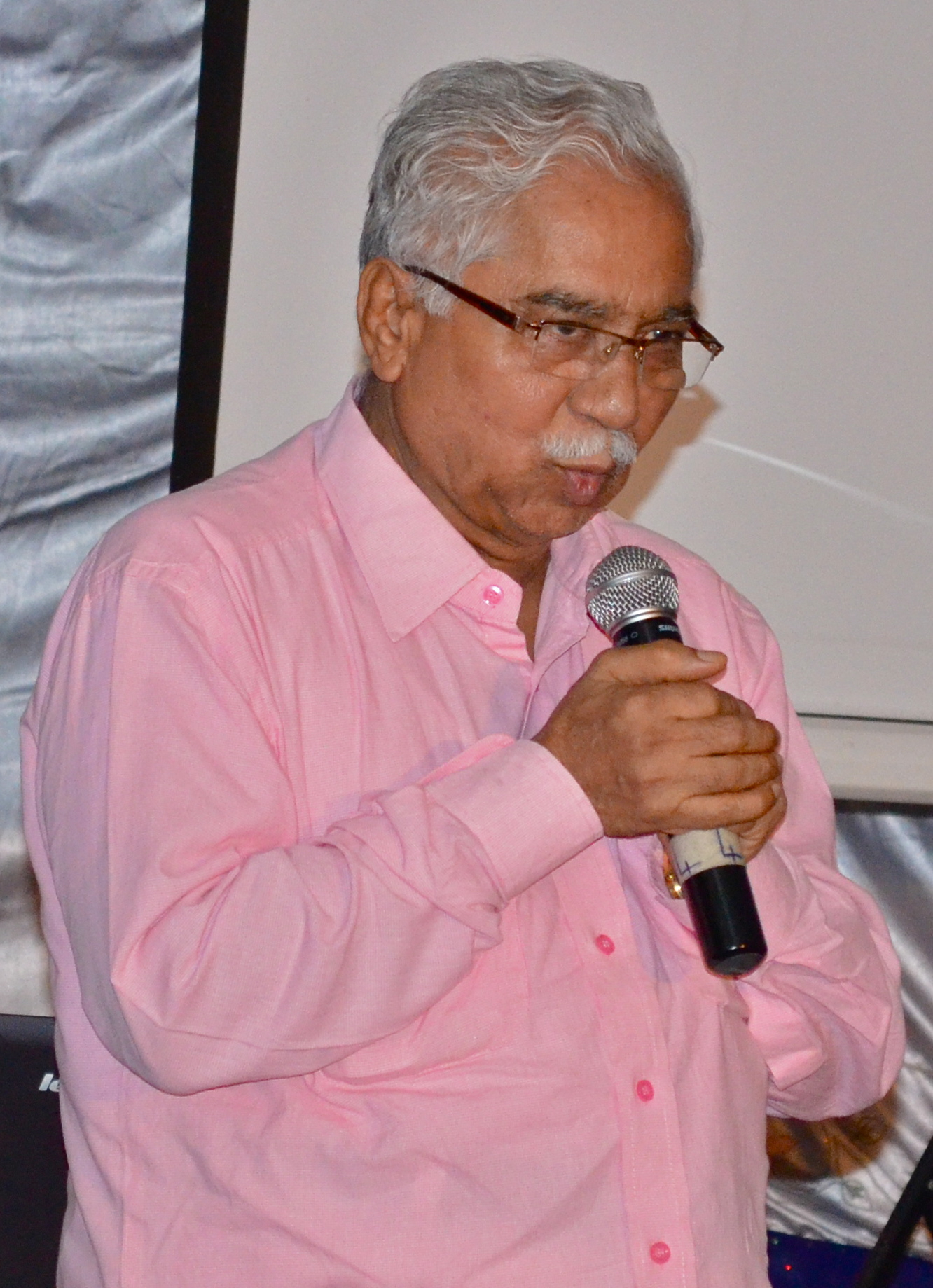
Chandrashekhara Kambara

Year	Recipient	Book
1963; 1964; 1965	• S. L. Bhyrappa • M. K. Indira	• Vamsha Vruksha • Sadananda
1966	• Kusumakar Devaragennur • Mallika	• Naalkaneya Aayaama • Jeevanaganga
1967	• Bharathisutha • Srinivas Udupa	• Girikanyaka • Olidu Bandavalu
1968	M. S. Murthy	Natyarani Shantala
1969; 1970	• Padmanabha Somayaji • Jayatheertha Rajapurohitha	• Panditaraja Jagannatha • Suligaali
1971	Suryanarayana Chadaga	Manetana
1972	Rao Bahaddur	Bitti Beledavaru
1973	• Vishnu Sharana • Maathe Mahadevi	• Kadalu • Heppitta Haalu
1974	• Kaamaroopi • Bharathisutha	• Kudure Motte • Giliyu Panjaradolilla
1975	Chandrakanth Kusanur	Yaatanaa Shibira
1976	M. K. Indira	Phaniyamma
1977	Na. Mogasaale	Nannadalladdu
1978	Sundar Nadakarni	Mandi Mane
1979	Rao Bahaddur	Gowdara Kona
1980	C. N. Lakshmi Devi	Gangarasa Durvineeta
1981	Kum. Veerabhadrappa	Kappu
1982	Chandrashekhara Kambara	Singarevva Mattu Aramane
1983	Sheshanarayana	Beesu
1984	Sara Aboobacker	Chandragiri Theeradalli
1985	Vyasaraya Ballal	Bandaya
1986	S. L. Bhyrappa	Saakshi
1987	Ma. Na. Javaraiah	Maagi
1988	M. P. Uma Devi	Badukalaarda Balavantaru
1989	Ka. Tha. Chikkanna	Munjaavu
1990	Yashwanth Chittal	Purushottama
1991	Vyasa Rao Ninjoor	Chamundeshwari Bhavana
1992	K. Satyanarayana	Gowri
1993	Kusumakar Devaragennur	Nireendriya
1994	Sunanda Belgaumkar	Jhavaadi
1995	P. V. Narayana	Dharmakaarana
1996	Balasaheb Lokapur	Bisilupura
1997	H. S. Champavathi	Shivaganga
1998	Kum. Veerabhadrappa	Shamanna
1999	H. Nagaveni	Gandhi Banda
2000	NO AWARD	
2001	Agrahara Krishamurthy	Neeru Mattu Preethi
2002	Balasaheb Lokapur	Hutta
2003	Raghavendra Patil	Teru
2004	Srinivas Vaidya	Halla Bantu Halla
2005	T. Sunandamma	Dwitva
2006	Janagere Venkataramaiah	Mahanadi
2007		
2008		
2009		
2010		
2011		
2012		
2013	Rajani Narahalli	Aatmavrittaanta
2014		
2015	Lata Gutti	
2016		
2017		
2018		
2019	Vasudhendra	Tejo Tungabhadra
2024	Y. S. Haragi	Imam Sahebara Kudura

=== Short story ===
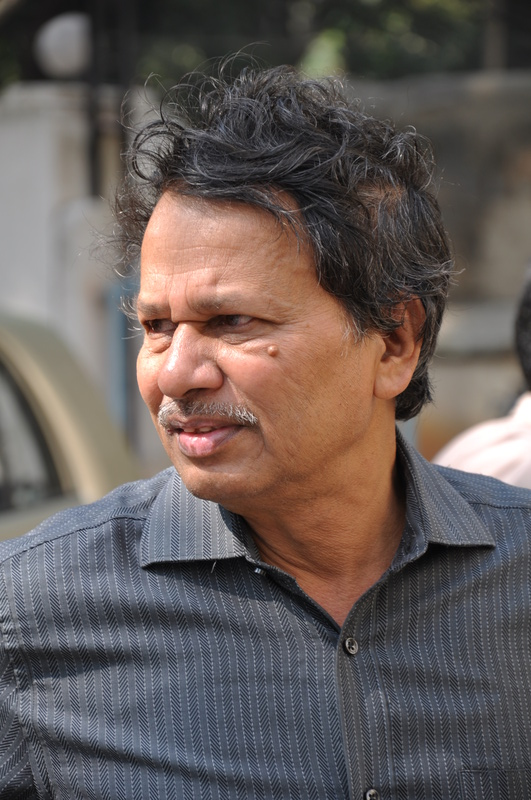
Baraguru Ramachandrappa

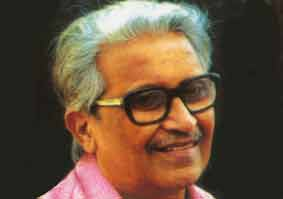
Shantinath Desai

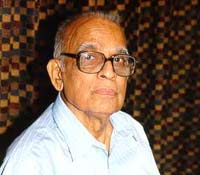
Yashwant Chittal

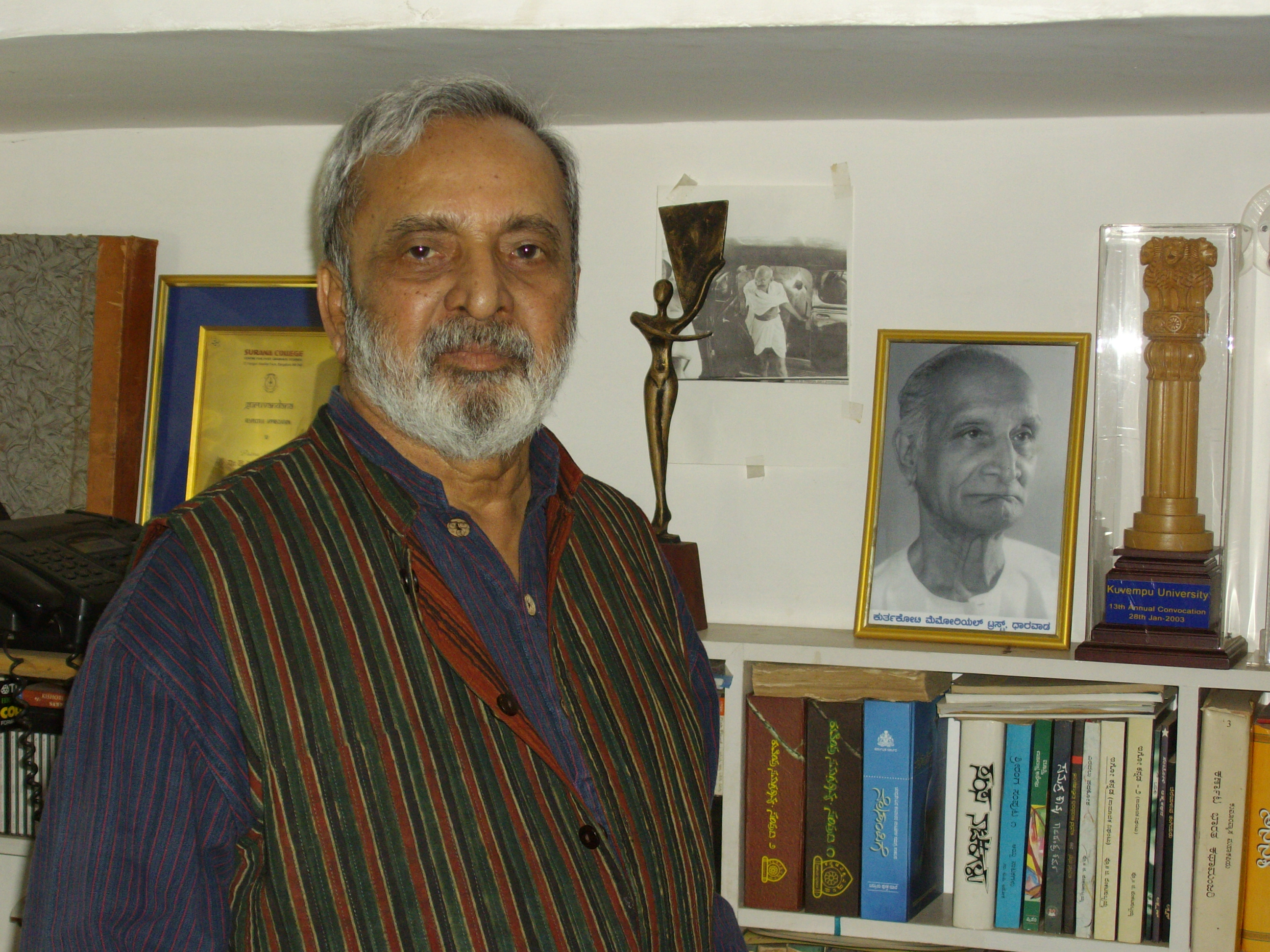
U.R.Ananthamurthy

Year	Recipient	Book
1967	• Besagarahalli Ramanna • M. K. Indira	• Nelada Odalu • Navaratna
1968	• Eshwar Chandra • Veerabhadra	• Theera • Ee Bhoomi Aa Aakaasha
1969; 1970	• Sudhakara • Udyavara Madhava Acharya	• Garike Beru • Baagida Mara
1971	K. Sadashiva	Aparichitaru
1972	• Besagarahalli Ramanna • Mavinakere Ranganathan	• Garjane • Parjanya
1973	Shantadevi Kanavi	Bayalu Aalaya
1974	• C. B. Sannaiah • A. N. Prasanna	• Thepe • Ulidavaru
1975	Baraguru Ramachandrappa	Suntaragaali
1976	Veena Shanteshwar	Kavalu
1977	Shantinath Desai	Rakshasa
1978	Rajashekhar Neeramanvi	Hanginaramaneya Horage
1979	Kalegowda Nagavara	Betta Saalu Male
1980	Yashwant Chittal	Katheyaadalu Hudugi
1981	U. R. Ananthamurthy	Aakaasha Mattu Bekku
1982	Jayant Kaikini	Teredashte Baagilu
1983	Boluvaru Mohammed Kunhi	Devarugala Raajyadalli
1984	Mavinakere Ranganathan	Ulidaddu Aakaasha
1985	Kalegowda Nagavara	Alegalu
1986	Bagalodi Devaraaya	Rudrappana Raudra Mattu Itara Kathegalu
1987	M. N. Vyasa Rao	Maleyalli Neneda Maragalu
1988	G. P. Basavaraju	Raja Mattu Hakki
1989	Jayant Kaikini	Dagadoo Parabana Ashwamedha
1990	Abdul Rasheed	Haalu Kudida Huduga
1991	Amaresha Nugadoni	Mannu Seritu Beeja
1992	Mogalli Ganesh	Buguri
1993	Bidarahalli Narasimhamurthy	Shishu Kanda Kanasu
1994	Chaduranga	Mrugayaa
1995	Ravi Belagere	Pa. Vem. Helida Kathe
1996	Jayant Kaikini	Amruthaballi Kashaaya
1997	Amaresha Nugadoni	Tamandhada Kedu
1998	Raghavendra Patil	Maayiya Mukhagalu
1999	Banu Mushtaq	Benki Male
2000	Bidarahalli Narasimhamurthy	Hamse Haarittu
2001	Fakir Mohammed Katpadi	Hejjaala
2002	Basavaraj Saadar	Thapdanda
2003	Sridhar Baligar	Ile Emba Kanasu
2004	Keshava Malagi	Vennela Doresaani
2005	Keshavareddy Handrala	Ondu Hidi Mannu
2006	Prahlad Agasanakatte	Manada Mundana Maaye
2007		
2008		
2009		
2010		
2011		
2012		
2013	M. S. Sriram	Salman Khanana Difficultiesu
2014		
2015	Anupama Prasad	
2016		
2017		
2018		
2019	Lakshmana Badami	Ondu Chitike Mannu
2025	Anil Gunnapur	Survey Number-97

=== Play ===
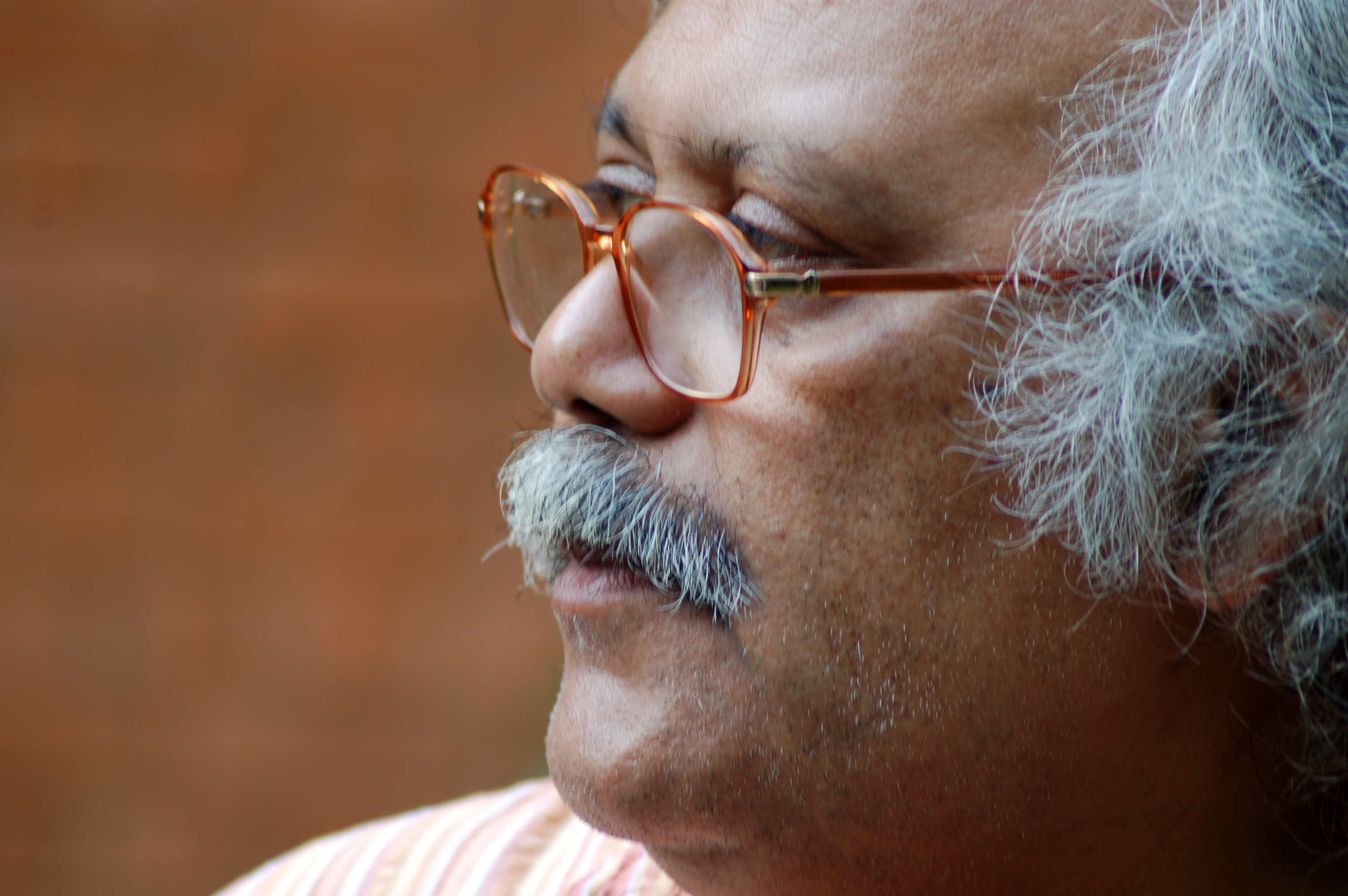
H. S. Shivaprakash

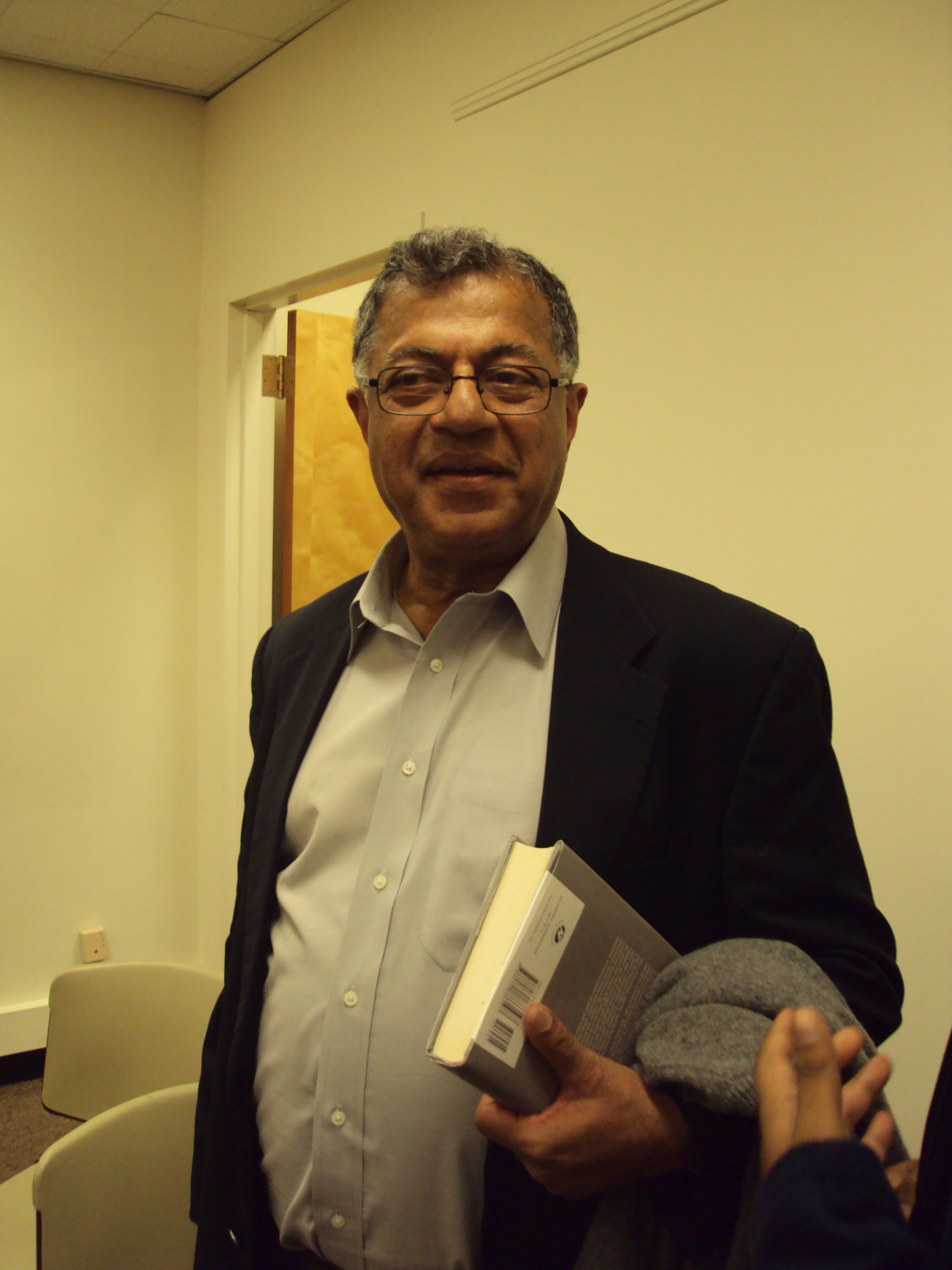
Girish Karnad

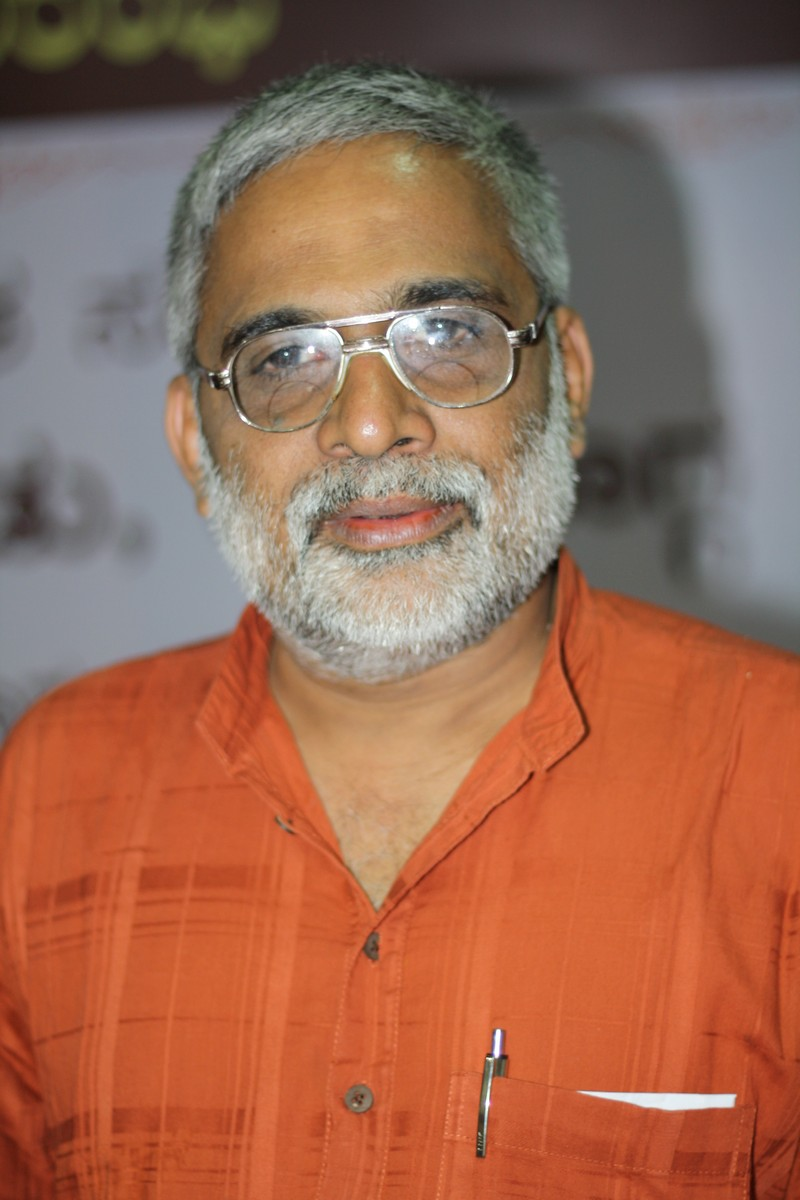
K.V.Akshara

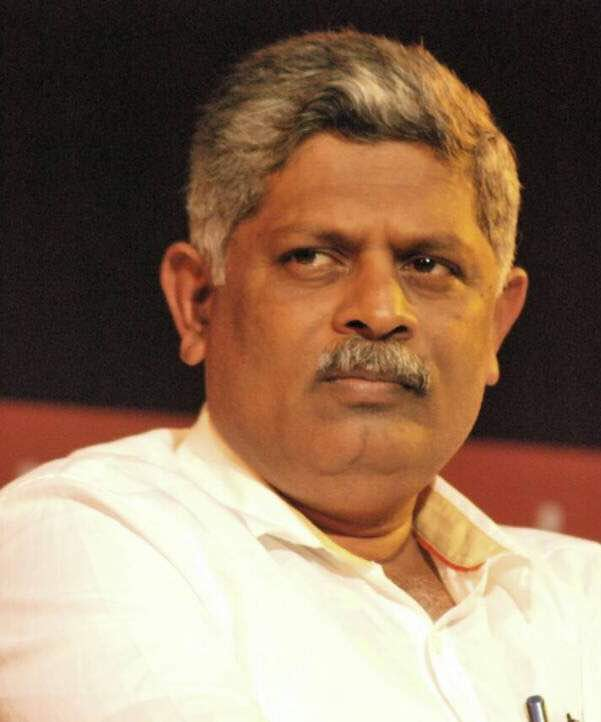
K.Y.Narayanaswamy

Year	Recipient	Book
1967	• K. N. Bhatta • I. Ma. Muttanna	• Vikaasa • Kaveri
1968	• B. Seetharama Shastry • Parvathavani	• Ksheera Sagara Naatakagalu • Kavibhikshe
1969	NO AWARD	
1970	NO AWARD	
1971	NO AWARD	
1972	Chandrakanth Kusanur	Naalku Asangatha Naatakagalu
1973	• P. Lankesh • Chandrashekhara Kambara	• Sankranthi • Jokumaraswamy
1974	• Jadabharatha • Chandrashekhar Patil	• Sattavara Neralu • Gokarnada Gowdasaani
1975	Chandrashekhara Kambara	Jaisida Naika
1976	Sri Ramadasa	Idu Bharatha
1977	M. S. K. Prabhu	Baka
1978	Bharathesha	Mahaa Sannidhaana
1979	Jadabharatha	Naane Bijjala
1980	Vijaya	Bandaro Bandaru
1981	Nisargapriya	Swargastha
1982	Prasanna	Thadroopi
1983	• Gopal Vajpeyi • B. V. Vykuntha Raju	• Doddappa • Sannivesha
1984	Chi. Srinivasaraju	Mooru Ekaankagalu
1985	V. G. Krishnamurthy	Nrupasomashekhara
1986	H. S. Shivaprakash	Mahaa Chaitra
1987	Prasanna	Mahimaapura
1988	Kyathanahalli Ramanna	Halagaliya Bedaru
1989	Chandrashekhara Kambara	Siri Sampige
1990	Girish Karnad	Taledanda
1991	T. N. Seetharam	Nammolagobba Naajookayya
1992	Chandrakanth Kusanur	Dindi
1993	H. S. Venkatesh Murthy	Ondu Sainika Vruttaantha
1994	Girish Karnad	Agni Mattu Male
1995	M. S. K. Prabhu	Cicero
1996	B. Suresha	Shaapurada Seeningi Satya
1997	K. V. Akshara	Sahyadri Kaanda
1998	NO AWARD	
1999	L. N. Mukunda Raj	Vyshampaayana Theera
2000	Prasanna	Jangamada Baduku
2001	Mudenur Sanganna	Soole Sankavve
2002	Ra. Ka. Nayaka	Ghoolimaddi Kattari
2003	Anand Rugvedi	Urvi
2004	H. L. Pushpa	Bhoomiyalla Ivalu
2005	K. Y. Narayanaswamy	Pampa Bharatha
2006	Manjunath Belakere	Nannolu Nee Ninnolu Naa
2007		
2008		
2009		
2010		
2011		
2012		
2013	K.Y. Narayanaswamy	Anabhigna Shakuntala
2014		
2015	Chidananda Sali	
2016		
2017		
2018		
2019	Usha Narasimhan	Kanchugannadi
2024	Chandru Kalenahalli	Gandhavati

=== Humour ===
Year	Recipient	Book
1963; 1964; 1965	Sadashiva Wadiyar	Raveendra Darshana
1968	NO AWARD	
1969	NO AWARD	
1970	NO AWARD	
1971	NO AWARD	
1972	H. L. Keshava Murthy	Neenyaako Ninna Hangyaako Maava
1973	Ka. Ra. Mohan	Priyatameya Shodhaneyalli
1974	M. S. Narasimha Murthy	Swayamvadhu
1975	B. C. Ramchandra Sharma	Pratibha Sandarshana
1976	Simpi Linganna	Naatyasaadhane
1977	A. Ra. Sethuram	Mugilahalliya Bakhairu Haagu Itara Lekhanagalu
1978	Simpi Linganna	Nooru Gadige Ondu Badige
1979	H. S. Krishnaswamy Iyengar	Surahonne
1980	Gorur Ramaswamy Iyengar	Haleya Palakeya Mukhagalu
1981	Veerendra Simpi	Bhaavamaiduna
1982	Ra. Ya. Dharawadakar	Thoorida Chintanegalu
1983	De. Javare Gowda	Thene
1984	P. V. Shastry	Himsegolagaada Magu Mattitara Prabandhagalu
1985	Masti Venkatesh Iyengar	Maatugaara Ramanna
1986	Ma. Su. Krishna Murthy	Haadi Puraana
1987	• D. K. Rajendra • Y. N. Krishna Murthy	• Maatina Mallaru • Padya Ishtu Lightaadre Hege Swamy?
1988	• K. Satynarayana • Bhuvaneshwari Hegde	• Namma Preethiya Cricket • Nakku Haguraagi
1989	• Chandrashekhar Alur • B. S. Chandrashekhar	• Naanu Olidante Haaduve • Maduveya Udugore
1990	• P. S. Ramanujam • Laangoolacharya	• Preethiya Pradarshana Mattu Itara Prabandhagalu • Vakradrushti
1991	• K. P. Poornachandra Tejaswi • M. Shivakumar	• Parisarada Kathe • Madhuchandra
1992	• M. Gopalakrishna Adiga • M. S. Narasimha Murthy	• Prabandhagalu • Vargaavargi
1993	• H. G. Sannaguddaiah • Anant Kallol	• Ekantha Mattu Itara Prabandhagalu • Hagarana
1994	Y. N. Krishna Murthy	Wonder Land
1995	P. S. Ramanujam	Bekkina Bhaashe Mattu Itara Vidambanegalu
1996	Bhuvaneshwari Hegde	Enthadu Maarayre
1997	R. Nirmala	Chal Meri Luna
1998	H. G. Sannaguddaiah	Haddu Mattu Itara Prabandhagalu
1999	R. V. Kulkarni	Shesha Vishesha
2000	Y. R. Mohan	Nenapugalu
2001	Vijayendra Kitthur	Aathmasaakshiya Haavaligalu
2002	Krishnamurty Kittur	Jeevana Sandhya
2003	Eerappa M. Kambali	Heegondu Top Prayana
2004	Chandrashekhar Alur	Sakhigeetha
2005	Gangadhar Modaliyar	Naalku Janarige Namaskaara
2006	Vasudhendra	Nammamma Andre Nangishta
2007		
2008		
2009		
2010		
2011		
2012		
2013		
2014		
2015		

=== Essay ===
Year	Recipient	Book
2001	Vijayendra Patil	Atmasaakshiya Haavaligalu
2015	H. Shantaraja Aithal	
2024	Shivaraj Byadarahalli	Ondu Tale Chavurada Kathe

=== Travelogue ===
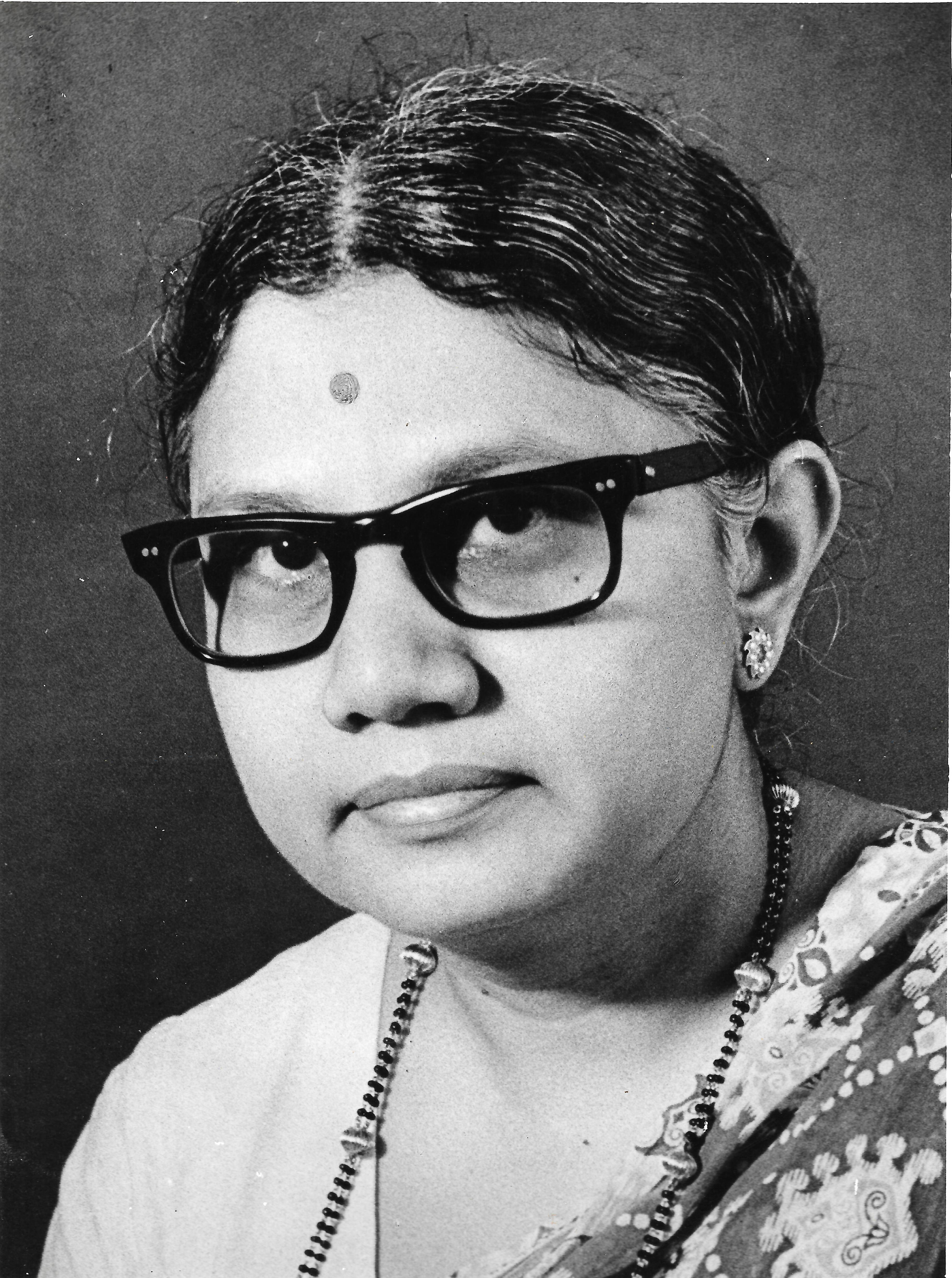
Anupama Niranjana

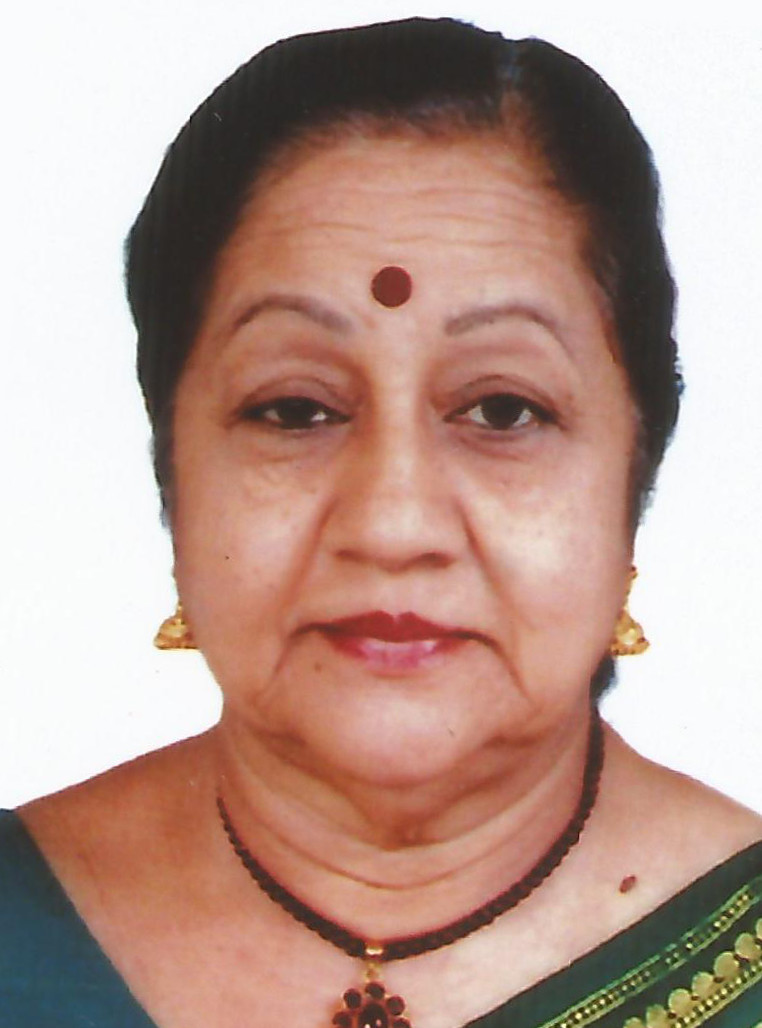
Aryamba Pattabhi

Year	Recipient	Book
1969; 1970	Krishnanada Kamat	Naanoo Americege Hogidde
1968	NO AWARD	
1969	NO AWARD	
1970	NO AWARD	
1971	• Ku. Shi. Haridasa Bhatta • Chandrabhaga Devi	• Itaaliya Naanu Kandante • Gejjeya Hejje Nudi
1972	NO AWARD	
1973	NO AWARD	
1974	• K. Anantaramu • Ha. Vem. Nagaraja Rao	• Udaya Raviya Naadinalli • Nava Russiada Nota
1975	Ho. Srinivasaiah	Naa Kanda Germany
1976	NO AWARD	
1977	NO AWARD	
1978	Prabhushankara	Americadalli Naanu, Shanti
1979	A. N. Murthy Rao	Aparavayaskana America Yaatre
1980	NO AWARD	
1981	Ku. Shi. Haridasa Bhatta	Jagadagala
1982	K. Anantaramu	Sakkareya Seeme
1983	Sriranjana Bhatta	Kubera Raajyada Chitra-Vichitra
1984	Anupama Niranjana	Angaiyalli Euro-America
1985	Pundikai Ganapaiah Bhat	Europe Nenapugalu
1986	Ra. Ya. Dharawadakar	Naa Kanda America
1987	Vysaraya Ballal	Naanobba Bharatheeya
1988	Ra. Ya. Dharawadakar	Naanu Kanda America
1989	H. S. Raghavendra Rao	Janaganamana
1990	K. P. Poornachandra Tejaswi	Alemariya Andaman Mattu Mahanadi Nile
1991	Krishananda Kamat	Bastara Pravaasa
1992	Shamantha	Girisneha
1993	S. Ramaswamy	Englandinalli Alemari
1994	G. P. Basavaraju	Bhookampada Antaranga
1995	Lata Gutti	Naa Kandante Arabia
1996	Siddharama Honkal	Panchanadigala Naadinalli
1997	Aryamba Pattabhi	Videsha Pravaasa
1998	I. A. Lokapur	Lokaavalokana
1999	M. Rajagopal	Saakaaradinda Niraakaarakke
2000	G. N. Mohan	Nannolagina Haadu Cuba
2001	Rahamat Tarikere	Andaman Kanasu
2002	N. K. Vasantaraja	Americadolagondu Inuku
2003	Meena Mysuru	Ettanindetta
2004	Nemichandra	Peruvina Pavitra Kaniveyalli
2005	C. S. Dwarakanath	Gandhi Mettida Naadinalli
2006	S. Venkatesh	Mruthyunjayana Madilinalli
2007		
2008		
2009		
2010		
2011		
2012		
2013		
2014		
2015	B. S. Pranatarthiharan	
2016		
2017		
2018		
2019	D. G. Mallikarjuna	Yordan Phireman

=== Biography / Autobiography ===
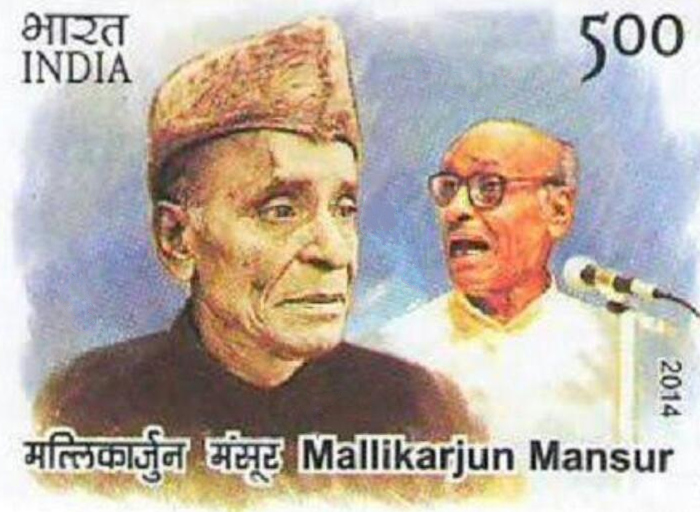
Mallikarjun Mansur

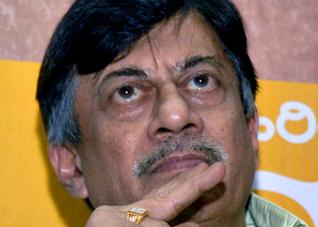
Anantanag

Year	Recipient	Book
1969; 1970	• V. Sitharamaiah • S. B. Managooli	• Mahaneeyaru • Maagidaroo Moggu
1972	• S. V. Chamu • Huragalavadi	• Sriranga Mahaguru • Swami Vivekananda
1974	• Babu Krishnamurthy • Ma. Sri. Deshpande • H. K. Ranganath	• Ajeya • Sri Gurudeva Ranade • Banna-Belaku
1975	G. V. Narayana Murthy	Vinoba Jeevana Darshana
1976	Neelattahalli Kasthuri	Siddavanahalli Krishna Sharma:Vyakti Mattu Shakti
1977	V. Sitharamaiah	Mumbai Vaasada Nenapugalu
1978	Kedambadi Jattappa Rai	Beteya Nenapugalu
1979	V. S. Narayana Rao	Mahatmara Maarga
1980	S. S. Kothina	Sonabai Doddamani
1981	V. M. Inamdar	Dr.Ambedkar
1982	Prabhushankara	Beragu
1983	Mallikarjun Mansur	Nanna Rasayaatre
1984	Babu Krishnamurthy	Adamya
1985	D. B. Basave Gowda	Naa Kanda Puttanna Kanagal
1986	B. V. Kakkillaaya	Fredric Angels
1987	V. S. Sampath Kumar Acharya	Sadguru Thyagarajaru
1988	K. S. Haridasa Bhat	Kattingeri Krishna Hebbar
1989	B. P. Radhakrishna	Raman
1990	M. V. Sitharamaiah	Pratimagruha
1991	M. R. Ramaiah	Hellen Kellar
2001	Anant Nag	Nanna Tamma Shankara
2013	Kuppe Nagaraj	Alemariya Antaranga
2015	Dodda Hulluru Rukkoji	
2016		
2017		
2018	Ma. Su. Mannar Krishna Rao	Bhaarata OkkooTa Nirmaapaka Ukkina Manushya Sardaar Vallabhabhai Patel
2019	B. M. Rohini	Naagandigeyolaginda
2024	Shivaraj Patil	Kaleda Kaala, Nadeda Doora

=== Criticism ===
Year	Recipient	Book
2001	Lakshmipathy Kolara	Kaaludaari
2015	H. L. Pushpa	
2016		
2017		
2018		
2019	Gurupada Mariguddi	Podeyindilida Edeya Hakki

=== Children work ===
Year	Recipient	Book
2001	Sharanagouda Yeradetthina	Muttina Betta
2015	Vijayashree Haladi	
2016		
2017		
2018		
2019	Vasumati Udupa	Abhijitana Kathegalu

=== Science writing ===
Year	Recipient	Book
2001	N. Someshwara	Badukaneeduva Badali Jodane
2015	N. Someshwara	
2016		
2017		
2018		
2019	K. S. Pavitra	Anthanka Mattu Bhayakke Sambandhisida Khayilegalu

=== Research ===
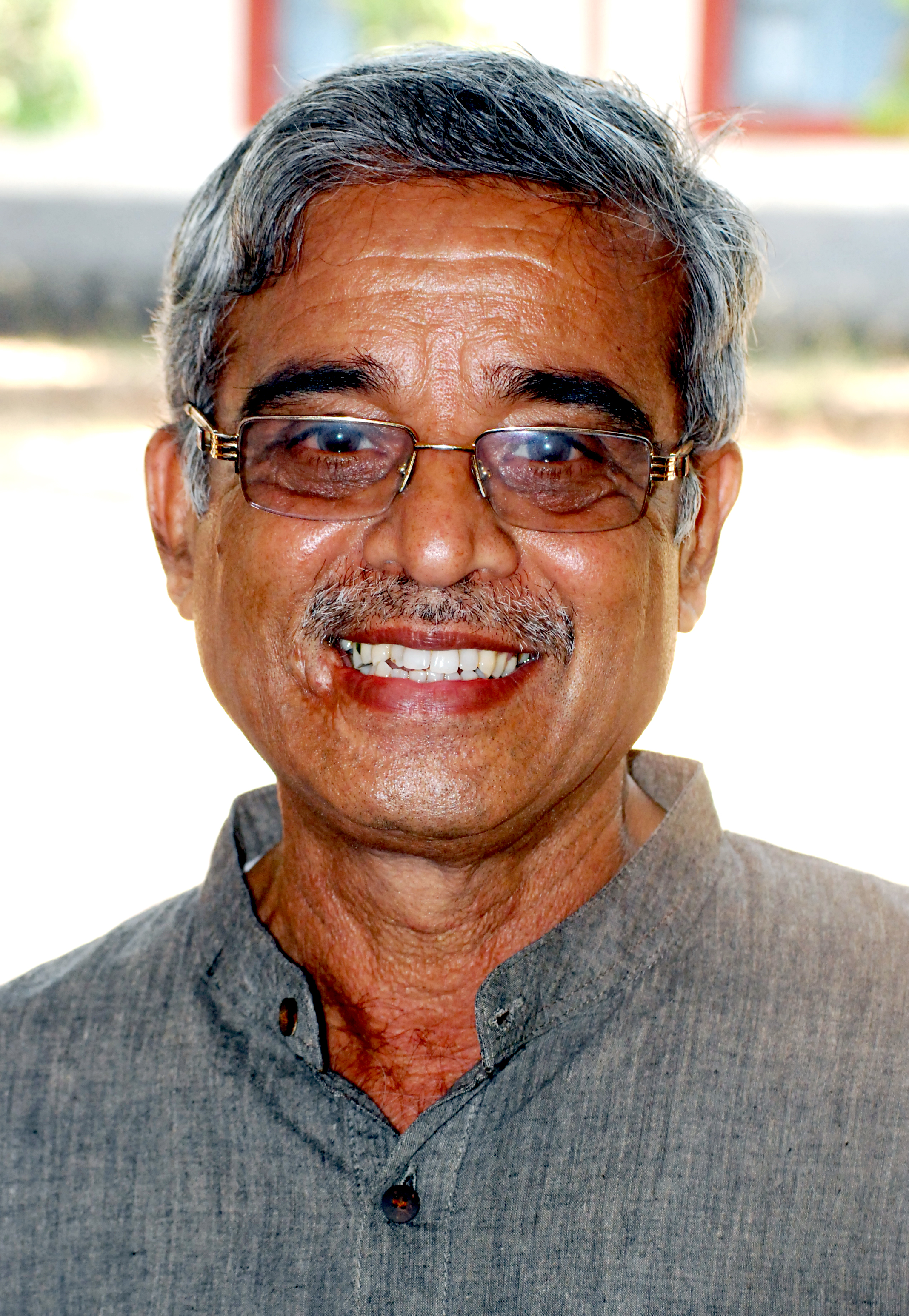
A.V.Navada

Year	Recipient	Book
2001	B. Rajashekarappa	Itihaasa Kathana
2015	A. V. Navada	
2016	Sharath Chandra Swami	Boudha Dharma Darshana
2017		
2018		
2019	Channabasavaiah Hirematha	Anaavarana

=== Translation (creative) ===
Year	Recipient	Book
2001	N. Ujire	Kempu Tagadina Chaavani
2015	Shylaja	

=== Translation (non-creative) ===
Year	Recipient	Book
2001	N. P. Shankar Narayana Rao	Mahatma Gandhi Suchi Sanchaya
2015	B. S. Jayaprakash Narayana	

=== Debut work ===
Year	Recipient	Book
2001	Prakash Raj Mehu	Thimmajjiya Myaglundi
2015	Deepa Girish	
2016		
2017		
2018		
2019	Kapila P. Humanabada	Haanaadi

== See also ==
- Sahitya Akademi Award to Kannada Writers
