= L. S. Sheshagiri Rao =

Indian writer and academic (1925–2019)

Lakshmeshwar Swamy Rao Sheshagiri Rao (16 February 1925 – 20 December 2019), often referred to as LSS, was an Indian writer and academic specializing in Kannada literature. He wrote an English-Kannada dictionary that is a standard reference text for students. Rao worked for government colleges before gaining a position at Bangalore University's English department. He was the first president of the Kannada Book Trust.

== Awards ==
Rao won the Kendra Sahitya Academy Award for his work English Sahitya Charitre. Rao was elected president of the 74th Kannada Sahitya Sammelana. Rao has also won the Rajyotsava Award, Masti Award, and the Karnataka Sahitya Academy Award for his work.

Death

He died on 20 December 2019 in Bengaluru, aged 94.
