= Go. Ru. Channabasappa =

Indian writer and folklorist

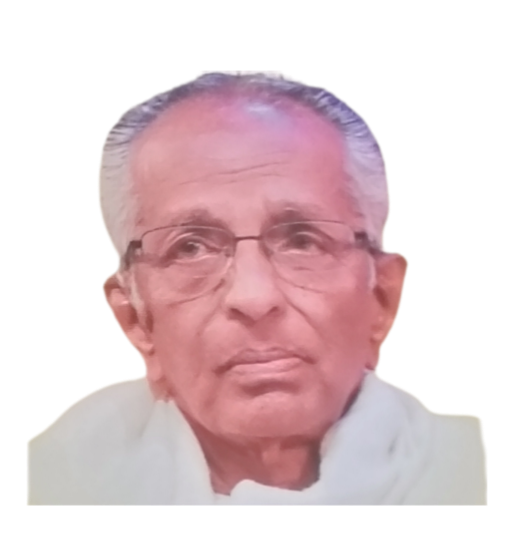
- Born: Channabasappa; 18 May 1930 (age 96); Gondedahalli, Chikmagalur, Kingdom of Mysore, British India (Now Karnataka, India)
- Occupations: Writer, folklorist, Scholar
- Writing career
- Genres: Vachana, Jaanapada

Gondedahalli Rudrappa Channabasappa (born 1930) or simply Go. Ru. Cha., is an Indian poet, writer, scholar and folklorist in Kannada. He is known for his works on Vachana Sahitya and Kannada folklore.

He served as the president of Kannada Sahitya Parishat from 1992 to 1995. The 87th Kannada Sahitya Sammelana of 2024 was chaired by Channabasappa.

== Early life ==
Basappa was born in 1930 in Gondedahalli, Chikmagalur to Rudrappa and Akkamma. He started his career as an English teacher in a school in Nidagatta, Mandya. He served in various posts in government sector.

== Works ==
Channabasappa has published many works on Kannada folklore and Vachana Sahitya including 'Sakhsikallu', 'Honna Bittevu Holakella', 'Karnataka Pragatipatha', 'Cheluvambike', 'Kunala', 'Bellakki Hindu Bedaryavo', 'Bagur Nagamma Grama Geetegalu', 'Mahadevi', 'Sadashiva Shivacharya', 'Vibhuti', 'Karnataka Janapada Kalegalu', among others.

== Accolades ==
Channabasappa has received many awards.

- Nadoja award
- National Basava Puraskara
- Rajyotsava Award by Karnataka government
