= Ko Chennabasappa =

Kannada writer, lawyer, and freedom fighter (died 2019)

Ko Chennabasappa (KoChe) was Kannada writer, lawyer and freedom fighter participated in the Quit India movement.

== Early life ==
KoChe was born in Alur in the Kudligi taluk of Ballari district of Karnataka.

== Work ==
KoChe is best known for his works that include Sri Ramayana Darshanam Mahakavya Samikshe, Khajane, Raktaparna, Hindurugi Baralilla, Nyayalayada Satyakathe, Hrudaya Naivedya and Belakinadege. He presided over the Kannada Sahitya Sammelana at Vijayapura in 2015.

== Books ==
- Prabuddha Nagarikatva Mattu Namma Manava Kendrita Rashtra
- Kavi Vibhuthige Namo
- Jagajjanani Bharata
- Koche Samagra Katha Kosha
- S Nijalingappa
