= M. R. Srinivasamurthy =

M. R. Srinivasa Murthy
- Born: 28 August 1892; Mysuru, British India
- Died: 16 November 1953
- Occupation: Fiction writer
- Writing career
- Genre: Fiction
- Subject: Kannada

M. R. SrinivasaMurthy (Mysuru Ramachandraraya Srinivasamurthy or M.R.Sri) (28 August 1892 – 16 November 1953) was a Kannada fiction and non fiction writer.

== Early life and education ==
Srinivasamurthy was born on 28 August 1892 in Mysuru. His father Ramachandraraya who was working in district office, and mother is Savitramma. He received his BA from Central College, Bengaluru in 1915. He served as teacher, education inspector, district education officer, and retired in 1947. He was a famous orator, good teacher, educationist.

== Literature work ==
He was president of 33rd Kannada Sahitya Sammelana held on 1950 in Solapur. He was a member of Kannada Sahitya Parishat and editor of Kannada news letter from the Parishat from 1950 to 1952 He has written 12 dramas and 3 novels. Two of his novels have become movies.

=== Plays ===
- Dharma Duranta ಧರ್ಮದುರಂತ
- Naagareeka
- Kanteerava Vijaya

=== Novels ===
- Saavitri
- Mahaatyaaga
- Rangannana Kanasina Dinagalu

=== Research ===
- Bhakti Bhandaari Basavanna
- Vachana dharmasaara

=== Science articles ===
- Upaadyayara Aarogya Shaastra (Study of Teachers Health)
- Magnetism
- Electricity
