= H. M. Nayak =

Indian Kannada folklorist, academic, scholar, writer

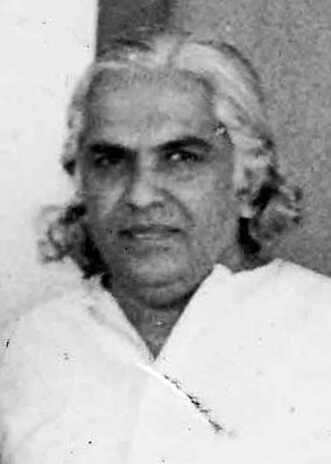
- Image of H. M. Nayak
- Born: Harogadde Manappa Nayak; 12 September 1931 Harogadde, Shivamogga, Mysore State, British India (now in Karnataka, India)
- Died: 10 November 2000 (aged 69) Mysore, Mysuru District, Karnataka, India
- Occupation: Academician; essayist; folklorist; writer
- Genre: Folklore and Essays

Harogadde Manappa Nayak (1931 - 10 November 2000) was an academic, writer and folklorist.

== Early life and career ==
He was born in the village Harogadde, of Theerthahalli Taluk, Shivamogga district in Karnataka. He served as a lecturer, and then professor, at the Mysore University, before being appointed the Director of the Kuvempu Institute of Kannada Studies at the university. Appointed the Vice-chancellor of Gulbarga University on 2 November 1984, he served until 15 February 1987, when he resigned citing moral responsibility for examination malpractices.

== Death ==
Nayak died, following a heart attack, in Mysore in the year 2000, at the age of 69.

== Literary works ==
- Namma Maneya Deepa, collection of essays
- Kannada Vratha
- Karnataka (1992)
- South Indian Studies (edited with B R Gopal, 1990)
- Samprati (1988)
- Soolangi, a collection of thirty reflective essays (1985)
- Epic in Indian literature (1985)
- Impact of Marxism on Indian life and literature - proceedings of a national seminar (editor, 1972)
- Janapada Swarupa, collection of essays on the nature and scope of folklore (1971)
- Kannada - Literary and Colloquial, a study of two styles (1967)

== Accolades ==
- 1985 - Nayak was presided the chair of 57th Kannada Sahitya Sammelana held in Bidar.
- 1989 - Sahitya Akademi Award for the work Samprati, collection of column writing.
