= K. T. Shah =

Indian economist, advocate and socialist (1888–1953)

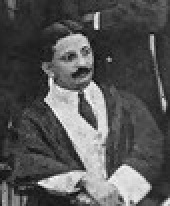
Prof. Khushal Shah at the farewell of Dr. Sarvepalli Radhakrishnan in 1922.

Khushal Talaksi Shah (1888–1953) was an Indian economist, advocate and socialist best known for his active role as a member of the Constituent Assembly of India that was responsible for framing of the Indian Constitution. An alumnus of the London School of Economics and Gray's Inn, he practiced as an advocate in Bombay from 1914. He was the main rival candidate in the first presidential election of Independent India, losing to Dr. Rajendra Prasad after securing 15.3% of votes. He died in March 1953.

== Contributions in Constituent Assembly ==
Khushal Shah was elected to the Constituent Assembly of India from Bihar and contributed immensely in the Constituent Assembly Debates. He was a member of the Advisory Committee and Sub-Committee on Fundamental Rights.

He made important interventions in the Constituent Assembly. Although several of his proposed amendments were rejected then, some of them were later adopted by later governments.

- Shah made two attempts to get the word "secular" included in the Constitution but failed on both the occasions. He moved yet another amendment that India, being a secular state, should have nothing to do with any religion, creed and/or profession of faith and would be totally detached in all matters of religion.
- Shah envisioned a greater role for judiciary in providing social transformation. In a debate on 19 November 1948, he said that "[The judiciary] is the only authority that we are going to set up in the Constitution to give effect to whatever hopes and aspirations, ambitions and desires, we may have in making these laws and in laying down this Constitution."
- Shah wanted to include Secular, Federal and Socialist in Article 1 and moved amendments twice for the same, Dr. Ambedkar rejected both the amendments at the meeting of the Drafting Committee.
- Shah stood for equality of states in the Union of States, so the following amendment was raised — "India shall be Union of States which are equal inter se". This amendment was not passed but it was agreed upon that provinces and states shall be merged and given equal status but it was now too soon for that to happen.
- Shah suggested the formation of competent Boundary Commission, or any other body or authority to settle and decide boundary readjustments. He even suggested direct referendum to make required boundary changes.
- Shah was in favor of the adoption of Presidential system of government.
- Shah and H. V. Kamath proposed that ministers should be obligated to declare their interests, rights and properties before they assumed office. This proposal was aimed at curbing corruption in politics. Ambedkar, in his reply in the Constituent Assembly on 31 December 1948 said that mere disclosure was insufficient and that "we have a better sanction for the enforcement of the purity of administration, and that is public opinion as mobilised and focussed in the Legislative Assembly".
- Shah suggested a constitutional prohibition against a judge's employment in any executive office, so that no temptation should be available to a judge for greater emoluments, or greater prestige which may affect his independence as a judge. He wanted the Judiciary to be independent from the Executive. But this was rejected by Dr Ambedkar who said that the government will have almost no interest in cases on which the Judiciary gives judgements, hence the chances of the Executive having an influence on the conduct of Judiciary is very remote.

== Other facts ==
- He was a playwright and wrote Gujarati plays.
- He was one of the members of the National Planning Committee, which was set up in 1938 under the chairmanship of Pandit Jawahar Lal Nehru.
