= Simpi Linganna =

Indian writer

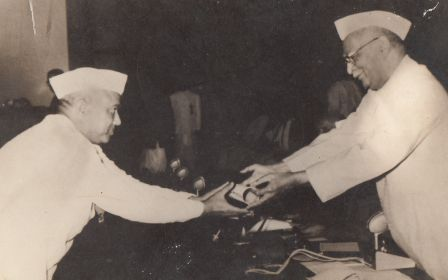
- Simpi Linganna
- Born: 1905; Chadchan, Indi, Bijapur district, Karnataka
- Died: 5 May 1993 (aged 87–88)
- Occupations: Teacher, writer
- Writing career
- Pen name: Bharatha

Simpi Linganna (1905 – 5 May 1993) was a writer of the Kannada language. He is known for his immense contribution for folk literature. He was the President of 62nd Kannada Sahitya Sammelana which was held at Koppal in 1992.

== Life and career ==
Simpi Linganna was born in 1905 in the village of Chadchan in Bijapur district of Karnataka. He basically worked as a primary school teacher and took up writing as a hobby.

== Literary contributions ==
- Swargadoolegalu
- Garathiya Baalu
- Janangada Jeevala
- Naatya Sadhane
- Mugilujenu

== Awards and recognitions ==
Simpi Liganna's many awards and recognitions include:

- President Award as a Teacher
- Karnataka Sahitya Akademi Award for Poetry (1968): Shruthaashrutha
- Honorary Doctor of Literature from Karnatak University
- Bombay Government Prize.
- Mysore Government Prize.
- President of 62nd Kannada Sahithya Sammelana, 1993, Koppal
