= Sollapur =

Solapur
- Village
- Location in Karnataka, India
- Coordinates: 16.2900°N 74.6000°E
- Country: India
- State: Karnataka
- District: Belgaum
- Talukas: Hukeri

Population (2001)
  - Total: 6,502

Language
  - Official: Kannada And Marathi
- Time zone: UTC+5:30 (IST)

Sollapur is a village in the southern state of Karnataka, India. It is located in the Hukeri taluk of Belgaum district in Karnataka.

== Demographics ==
At the 2001 India census, Sollapur had a population of 6502 with 3321 males and 3181 females.

== See also ==
- Belgaum
- Districts of Karnataka
