= List of Rajyotsava Award recipients (1966–1970) =

Karnataka Rajyotsava Prashasti
- Civilian award
- Sponsored by: Government of Karnataka
- Formerly called: Mysore State Award (1966–1972)
- Rewards: • ₹1,00,000/- • Gold Medal
- First award: 1966
- Final award: 2020

Highlights
- Total awarded: 2400 (Awardees including Individuals & Institutions)

The Rajyotsava Prashasti or Rajyotsava Awards, the second highest civilian honor of the Karnataka state of India are conferred annually by the Karnataka Government on the occasion of the establishment of the state on 1 November celebrated as the Kannada Rajyotsava.

The awards are presented in Bengaluru by the Chief Minister of Karnataka on 1 November of every year. Each award carries an amount of ₹100,000, a 20-gram gold medal and a citation. In addition to that, the government has in the past, allotted commercial land for eligible awardees.

== Recipients ==
Year	Recipients	Field
1966	M. C. Modi	Medicine
1966	Kamaladevi Chattopadhyay	Social Work
1966	M. Adikesavulu	Medicine
1966	Veerannagowda Patil	Social Work
1966	M. Narasimhaiah	Engineering
1966	H. F. Kattimani	Education
1966	Muniswamappa	Social Work
1966	D. N. Krishnaiah Setty	Social Work
1966	Bhagirathibai Puranik	Social Work
1966	Bheemarao Potdar	Indian Independence Movement
1967	Kapatral Krishna Rao	Research
1967	Albuquerque	Social Work
1967	Umadevi Kundapur	Social Work
1967	Krishnappa	Social Work
1967	K. Sampathgiri Rao	Education
1967	Malladihalli Raghavendra	Social Work
1967	S. Malurkar	Mathematics & Science
1967	B. Venkatasubba Rao	Medicine
1967	Gopalarajan	Medicine
1967	Aadya Anantacharya	Ayurveda
1968	B. K. Belliappa	Social Work
1968	K. M. Nanjappa	Social Work
1968	A. K. Lingappa Gowda	Social Work
1968	K. P. Puttegowda	Social Work
1968	Patel Marigowda	Social Work
1968	Yavagal	Social Work
1968	Manik Rao Bhim Rao Patil	Social Work
1968	K. T. Ramaswamy	Music
1968	Honnaiah	Social Work
1968	Champabai Firoz Bogal	Social Work
1968	Subrahmanya Shetty Tammaji	Social Work
1968	Y. H. Venkataramanappa	Social Work
1969	Yaamunacharya	Education
1969	H. V. Krishna Rao	Agriculture
1969	B. R. Purohith	Journalism
1969	B. H. Katharaki	Agriculture
1969	Appa Rao	Agriculture
1969	V. Dasappa Reddy	Agriculture
1969	A. R. Chikkappaiah	Sports
1969	R. Nagendra Rao	Drama / Cinema
1969	R. Marthanda Varma	Medicine
1969	H. Narasimhaiah	Education
1969	P. R. Ramaiya	Journalism
1970	P. I. Joseph	Sports
1970	H. V. Narayana Rao	Engineering
1970	Gangubai Hangal	Music
1970	Gaadi Cheluvarayana Shetty	Social Work
1970	Mallikarjunappa Gowda	Social Work
1970	Mohammed Shafi	Medicine
1970	H. R. Arakeri	Agriculture
1970	Devangi Prafulla Chandra	Progressive Farming
1970	Katte Sethuramachar	Progressive Farming
1970	G. P. Rajarathnam	Literature
1970	B. R. Panthulu	Cinema
1970	Victoria S. Peter	Social Work
1970	Doraiswamy Iyengar	Music
1970	Puttaraj Gawai	Music
1970	M. K. Vaidya	Medicine
