= M. Venkatakrishnaiah =

Indian journalist and social reformer

M. Venkatakrishnaiah (1844–1933) was pioneer of journalism, author, social reformer, educator, civil servant and philanthropist based in the city of Mysore, India. He was often referred to as the grand-old man of Mysore or Tataiah. His achievements contributed immensely towards Mysore's notability as a famed center of education and model city. He wrote and published a series of newspapers such as the Hita Bodhini (1883), Sadhvi (1899), Vrittanta Chintamani (1885), Mysore Herald, Poura Samajika Patrike, Mysore Patriot, Mysore Review, Wealth of Mysore, Nature Cure and Sampadabhyudaya.
