= Ardeshir Ruttonji Wadia =

Indian author and politician

Ardeshir Ruttonji Wadia (1888–1971) was an author from India who was awarded Padma Bhushan in 1961 by Government of India for his contribution to literature. He was born in Mumbai in 1888 and studied law. A Parsee, he was educated at St Xavier's College, Wilson College, St Catherine's College, Oxford, and Cambridge University. From 1917 to 1942 he served as Professor and, for 3 years, as Dean at the University of Mysore. He served as a member of Mysore Legislative Council from 1930 to 1931 and from 1942 to 1943. He was a nominated member of Rajya Sabha (Upper House of Indian Parliament) from 1954 to 1966. He died in 1971.

== Books ==
- The Life and Teachings of Zoroaster
- The Ethics of Feminism: A Study of the Revolt of Woman
- Democracy and Society
- The Bombay Dockyard and the Wadia Master Builders
- History and Philosophy of Social Work in India
- The Philosophy of Mahatma Gandhi: And Other Essays, Philosophical and Sociological
