= S. R. Ramaswamy =

Indian journalist and writer (1937–2026)

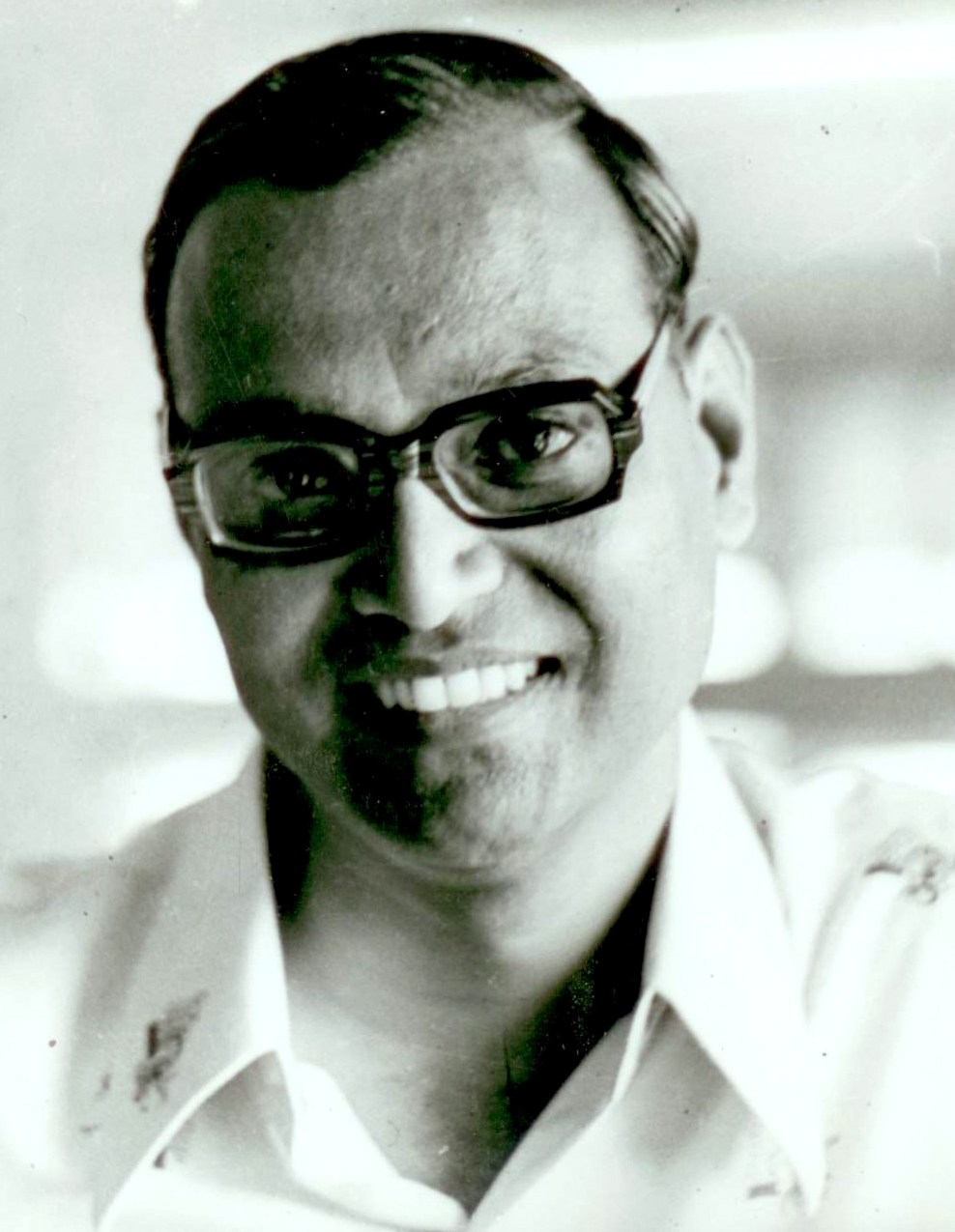
- Born: 29 October 1937; Bangalore, Kingdom of Mysore, India
- Died: 10 April 2026 (aged 88); Bengaluru, Karnataka, India
- Education: The National College, Bengaluru
- Writing career
- Subjects: Journalism, literature, criticism, editing, environmental conservation
- Notable works: Shatamanada Tiruvinalli Bharata (1989); Svetoslav Roerich: A Collective (1974); Kolminchu (1996); Deevitgegalu (1998); Kargil Kampana (1999)
- Notable awards: Karnataka Sahitya Academy Award (1992); Aryabhata Award (2006); Rajyotsava Award (2008)
- Website: S. R. Ramaswamy

Sondekoppa Ramachandrasastri Ramaswamy (29 October 1937 – 10 April 2026) was an Indian writer, journalist, biographer, social activist and environmentalist. He authored more than 50 books and a thousand articles both in Kannada and English. He was recipient of the Karnataka Sahitya Academy Award for the year 1992's best work in social sciences. In 2015, he was honoured by Kannada University, Hampi, with the Nadoja Award. An avid campaigner for environmental issues and people's rights, Ramaswamy led numerous movements both at state and national level for conservation of vast tracts of rich flora and fauna from ill-planned Government policies. His years as a writer and chronicler brought him under the influence of doyens of literature and public life such as D. V. Gundappa, V. Sitaramayya, Rallapalli Ananta Krishna Sharma, Yadava Rao Joshi and P. Kodanda Rao. His writings essentially mirror the literary, cultural, nationalist and developmental problems that are contemporaneous to the present day scenario. Ramaswamy also served as honorary editor-in-chief of Kannada monthly Utthana and Rashrothana Sahitya in Bangalore.

== Early life and education ==
S. R. Ramaswamy was born to Mulukanadu Brahmin parents S. Ramachandra Sastri and Sarasvatamma on 29 October 1937 at Bangalore. He came from a scholarly lineage and was the nephew of the historian and polyglot S. Srikanta Sastri as well as Asthan Vidwan Motaganahalli Subramanya Sastri who was editor of "Ranga Bhoomi" and is credited with "Karnata Malavikagnimitra" and translation of Valmiki's Ramayana from Sanskrit to Kannada. He was the great-grand-nephew of Maha Asthan Vidwan Motaganahalli Ramasesha Sastri who was the first person to translate Bhagavata from the original Sanskrit to Kannada and Asthan Vidwan Motaganahalli Shankara Sastri who is credited with the composition of "Vedanta Panchadarshi", a work extensively quoted by D. V. Gundappa. Ramaswamy's ancestor Yagnapathi Bhatta or Yagnam Bhatta was a court poet in the court of Immadi Kempegowda. Ramaswamy's older brother was the journalist S. R. Krishnamurthy.

Ramaswamy had his preliminary schooling at Bangalore High School at Bangalore. He later on studied the intermediate course at The National College, Basavanagudi, Bangalore in the years 1953–54.

== Career ==
=== Journalism ===
Ramaswamy began his career in journalism as an assistant editor at the William Quan Judge (W. Q. Judge) Press at Bangalore in the late 1950s. Following a brief interlude, he joined the Kannada weekly Sudha as the chief sub-editor in 1972, a position he held until 1979. In 1980, he was made Honorary editor-in-chief at Rashrothana Sahitya and Kannada monthly Utthana in Bangalore. Ramaswamy also actively delivered lectures at seminars and conferences across the country concerning a wide range of social, cultural and literary topics.

He continued to contribute actively to Kannada dailies such as Prajavani and Kannada Prabha among others. He was well versed in Sanskrit, Hindi, German, French, Kannada and Telugu – and had authored 55 books both in Kannada and English and about a thousand articles, excluding numerous translations from various languages to Kannada. An excerpt from one of his earliest pieces – a review of noted French poet, essayist and philosopher – Ambroise Paul Toussaint Jules Valéry's "The Quintessentialised Intellectual" published in the 1972 PEN International Edition summarises his keen insight and in-depth knowledge of world literature:

It is one of the curiosities of Paul Valéry's many sided literary activity that notwithstanding the versatility of his writings and the steadily increasing sway he gained over the French mind during the first three decades of the present century (20th), the clue to an understanding of his life and work is found to be in what is probably one of his earliest works – "Une Soiree avec. M. Teste" (An Evening with Mr.Teste) published so far back as 1896

Ramaswamy came to prominence when he authored an "Art Catalogue" on famous Russian painter Svetoslav Roerich chronicling his many paintings and exhibitions that the painter hosted in different countries across the world. The book has in it some rare photographs depicting the acclaimed Russian painter explaining and often showcasing his works to leaders such as Nikita Khrushchev and Pandit Jawaharlal Nehru among others. Printed in limited numbers, the book is seldom found in libraries and is a collector's item today. Ramaswamy also came into contact with such eminent personalities as art critic Venkataram and internationally renowned Gandhian economists Lakshmi Chand Jain and Sri Kumarappa.

=== Public life and social activism ===
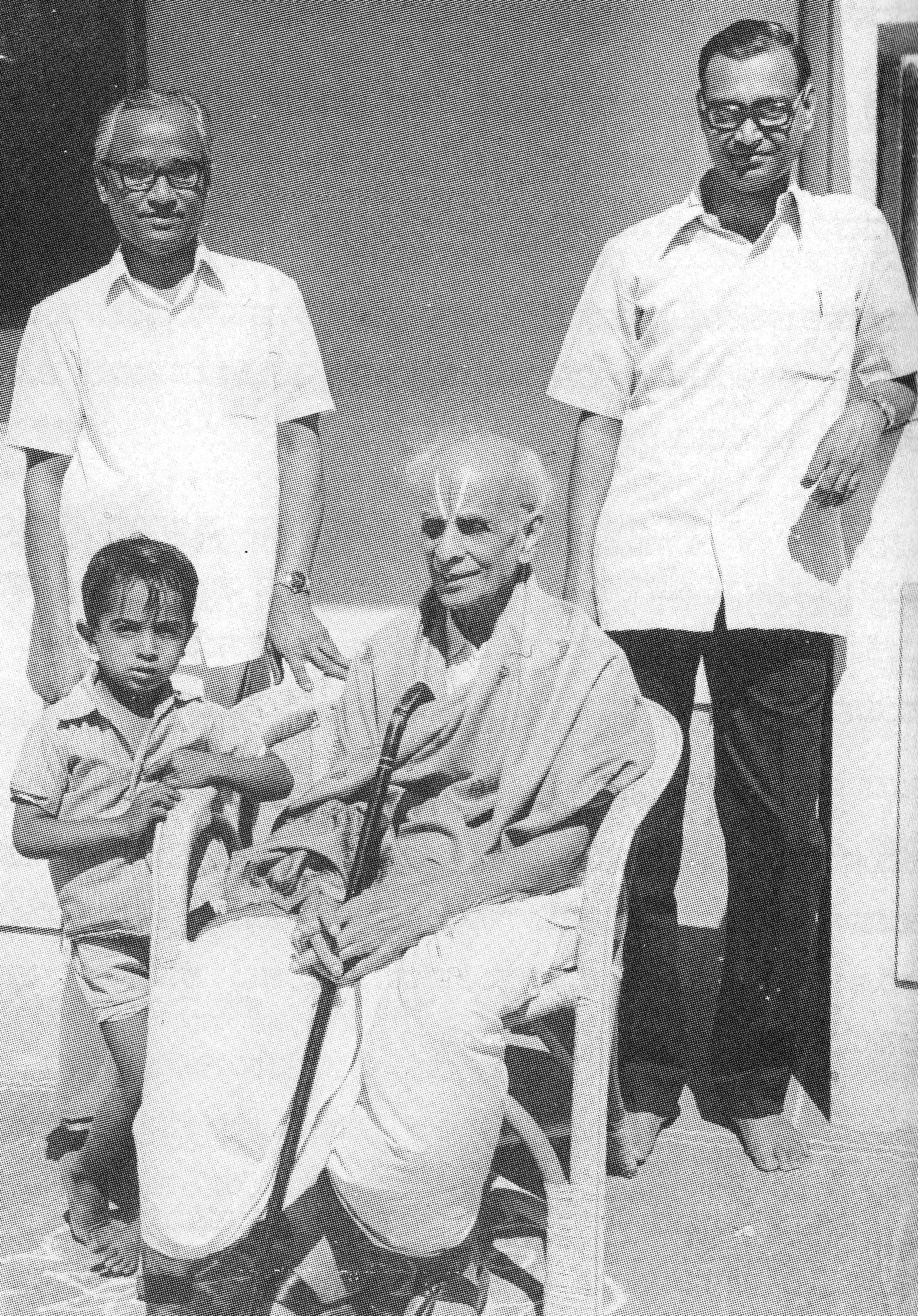
Ramaswamy (right) with Rallapalli Ananta Krishna Sharma (seated)

Ramaswamy was active in literature and journalism for over five decades and was a staunch advocate of the Swadeshi movement in India. Over the last few decades, Ramaswamy spearheaded Voluntary Rural Development Initiatives in Karnataka with the aim of empowering the rural population for self-governance and better administration. He spoke for various environmental causes, both at state and national levels, often culminating in landmark legal battles before the Supreme Court of India. Most memorable of these was a Public Interest Litigation (PIL) he fought along with noted Kannada Litterateur Shivaram Karanth against Government of Karnataka concerning the conservation of nearly 30,000 hectares of reserve forest which was set aside to be handed over to a paper industry.

His association with noted composer, singer and writer Rallapalli Ananta Krishna Sharma enabled him to acquire proficiency in Carnatic as well as Hindustani classical music. His proficiency in the classical Indian dance form – Bharata Natyam was the result of his years of association with eminent dance maestro V. S. Kowshik.

Having remained a bachelor, Ramaswamy continued to remain active in public life. The "Gokhale Institute of Public Affairs" – an independent, non-party and non-communal organization established to function as a centre for education of the public towards a constructive democratic citizenship was founded in the year 1949 by noted Kannada writer and philosopher D. V. Gundappa. After Gundappa's tenure, the administration fell on the shoulders of retired Chief Justice of the Karnataka High Court – Nittoor Srinivasa Rau who subsequently bequeathed the administrative responsibilities to Ramaswamy, who headed the organization in the position of Secretary. Ramaswamy had the distinction of organizing four programmes a month over 12 months, almost a year in advance.

He consistently declined requests to visit foreign countries in connection with various conferences and seminars. In fact, he declined an invitation from the United Nations Office for a Global Environmental Summit at Rio de Janeiro in the 1990s citing personal reasons. However, Ramaswamy involved himself in the Indian setting and delivered papers at over 100 seminars and workshops on topics such as Sharathchandra (1977), Towards Understanding Hindu Society (1990), Gandhian Concept of Ecology (1992), Netaji Subhas Chandra Bose (1996), The Regime of Sir Mirza Ismail (1998), Life and Work of V. Sitaramaiah, Swadeshi movement of 1905: Historic Turning Point (2005), Saga of Patriotism: Martyrs in the Freedom Movement (2007), Contribution of Rallapalli Ananta Krishna Sharma to Kannada and Telugu (2010), Life and Work of D. V. Gundappa (2011), Contribution of Sanskritist Professor S. K. Ramachandra Rao (2013) and Belagere Krishna Sastri (2013).

== Death ==
Ramaswamy died in Bengaluru on 10 April 2026, at the age of 88.

== Bibliography ==
=== Writing ===
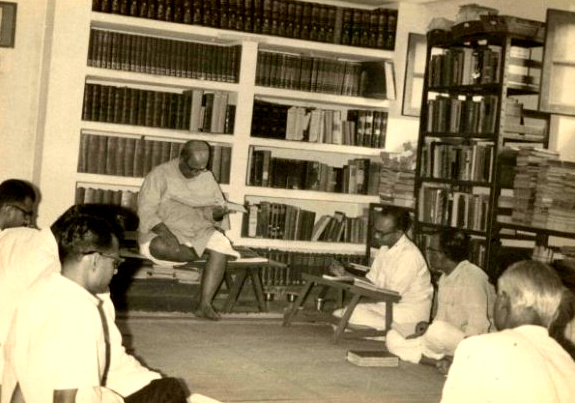
S. R. Ramaswamy with D. V. Gundappa

S. R. Ramaswamy came under the umbrella of intellectuals such as D. V. Gundappa, V. Sitaramayya, Rallapalli Ananta Krishna Sharma, A. R. Krishnashastry, P. Kodanda Rao and Yadava Rao Joshi among others. He put to paper many of D. V. G.'s dictations and also compiled, edited and proof-read Gundappa's works – including "Jeevanadharmayoga" and "Bhagavadtatparya".

His first book "Mahabharatada Belavanige" (1972) attracted attention from critics. His two volumes on Russian painter Svetoslav Roerich, which came out as a collective in 1974, is an archive of the great painter's works and exhibitions around the world. In 1992, he was awarded the Karnataka Sahitya Akademi Award in the Social Science category for his 1989 publication, Shatamanada Tiruvinalli Bharata (India at the Turn of the Century). B. R. Ambedkar's biography co-authored with Chandrashekhar Bhandary titled "Samaja-Chikitsaka Ambedkar" published in 1990 attracted great attention and commendation for its truthfulness, accuracy and lack of bias. In fact, it has been widely translated into many Indian vernacular languages over the years. S. R. Ramaswamy's outspoken stand on the "Swadeshi" ideology was mirrored in two of his books published in 1994 titled "Swadeshi Jagruti" and "Swadeshi: Ondu Samvada" (Swadeshi: A Dialogue). His take on Globalisation and its impact on Developing World economies was well illustrated in his book published in 1995 titled "In The Woods of Globalisation". The successive year, 1996, he penned a biography of the president of the Indian National Congress and later the Indian National Army Subhas Chandra Bose titled "Kolminchu", which was received well by critics and readers alike. In the successive years, S. R. Ramaswamy brought out collections of brief biographical sketches of eminent personalities such as S. Srikanta Sastri, D. V. Gundappa, V. Sitaramayya, Rallapalli Ananta Krishna Sharma, Virakesari Sitarama Sastri, N. Chennakeshaiavaih, Yadavraj Joshi, P. Kodanda Rao, Ti. Ta. Sharma, Pt. Seshadri Gawai, M. H. Marigowda and V. S. Kowshik among others in two books titled "Deevitegegalu" and "Deeptimantaru" in 1998 and 2011. In addition to these, there are in excess of 20 various books of different Indian languages which have been translated to Kannada.

=== List of Books ===
- Ramaswamy, S. R. (1972) – Mahabharata Belavanige
- Ramaswamy, S. R. (1974) – Svetoslav Roerich (Ed.)
- Ramaswamy, S. R. (1976) – D. V. G. – a biography
- Ramaswamy, S. R. (1979) – Udaya Shankar – a biography
- Ramaswamy, S. R. (1980) – Sripad Damodar Satwalekar – a biography
- Ramaswamy, S. R. (1985) – Aravinda – Pt. Seshadri Gawai Felicitation Volume (Ed.)
- Ramaswamy, S. R. (1989) – Shatamanada Tiruvinalli Bharata
- Ramaswamy, S. R. (1990) – Samaja Chikitsaka Ambedkar
- Ramaswamy, S. R. (1992) – Bharatadalli Samajakarya – (Ed.)
- Ramaswamy, S. R. (1994) – Swadeshi Jagruti
- Ramaswamy, S. R. (1994) – Arthikatheya Eradu Dhruva
- Ramaswamy, S. R. (1994) – Swadeshi: Ondu Samvada
- Ramaswamy, S. R. (1995) – In The Woods of Globalisation
- Ramaswamy, S. R. (1996) – Kolminchu
- Ramaswamy, S. R. (1997) – Swantantrodyayada Mailigallu
- Ramaswamy, S. R. (1998) – Deevatigegalu(pictured in photo)
- Ramaswamy, S. R. (1999) – Matantara: Ondu Samvada – co-authored with Chandrashekhara Bhandary
- Ramaswamy, S. R. (1999) – Kargil Kampana

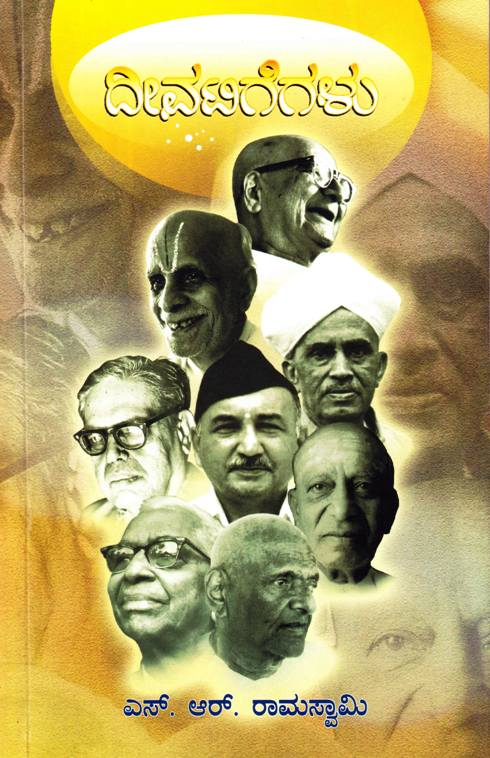
"Deevatigegalu" (a collection of biographies) by S. R. Ramaswamy

- Ramaswamy, S. R. (2000) – Sir Mokshagundam Visvesvaraya a biography
- Ramaswamy, S. R. (2000) – Sardar Vallabhai Patel a biography
- Ramaswamy, S. R. (2000) – Jayaprakash Narayan a biography
- Ramaswamy, S. R. (2001) – Magadi Lakshminarasimha Sastri a biography
- Ramaswamy, S. R. (2010) – Kelavu Itihasa Parvagalu
- Ramaswamy, S. R. (2009) – Nagarikathegala Sangharsha
- Ramaswamy, S. R. (2009) – Sahiti-Samarangana-Sarvabhouma Krishnadevaraya
- Ramaswamy, S. R. (2009) – Kautilyana Arthashastra
- Ramaswamy, S. R. (2010) – Sookti Saptati
- Ramaswamy, S. R. (2011) – Deeptimantaru
- Ramaswamy, S. R. (2011) – Dhruvajala
- Ramaswamy, S. R. (2011) – Bharata Bhaskara Rabindranath Tagore
- Ramaswamy, S. R. (2012) – Yajurveda Belakinalli Jeevana Paripoornate
- Ramaswamy, S. R. (2013) – Navotthanada Pathadarshaka Swami Vivekananda
- Ramaswamy, S. R. (2014) – Kavalige
- Ramaswamy, S. R. (2019) – The Evolution of the Mahabharata and Other Writings on the Epic
- Ramaswamy, S. R. (2022) – Essays and Speeches (2 Volumes)

=== List of Translations ===
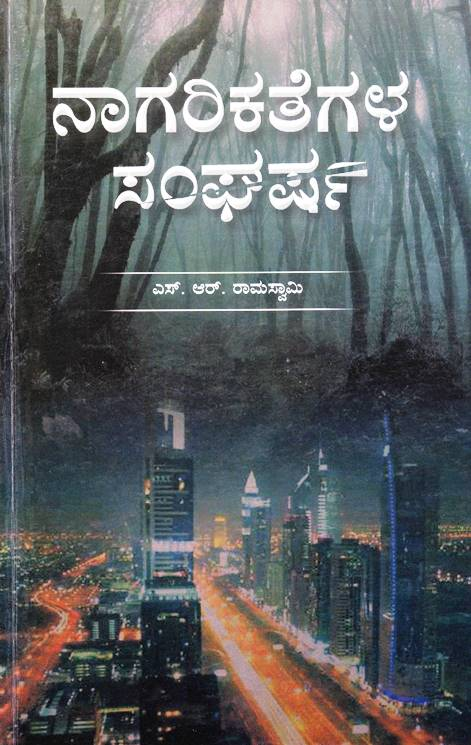
"Nagarikathegala Sangharsha" by S. R. Ramaswamy

- Ramaswamy, S. R. (1975) – Patra Gucha – Nehru: A Bunch of Old Letters, (with K. S. Narasimha Swamy)
- Ramaswamy, S. R. (1981) – Dr Hedgewar: The Epochmaker,
- Ramaswamy, S. R. (1982) – Manobodha of Samarth Ramadas
- Ramaswamy, S. R. (1987) – Sangha – Gita from Sanskrit
- Ramaswamy, S. R. (1987) – Mahavedha by Chivukula Purushottam (from Telugu)
- Ramaswamy, S. R. (1989) – Bharata Jagruti by Dharma pal (from English)
- Ramaswamy, S. R. (1991) – Arya Akramana: Budavillada Vada by N. R. Waradpande (from English)
- Ramaswamy, S. R. (1992) – Top Writer by Panuganti (from Telugu)
- Ramaswamy, S. R. (1994) – I.C.C.U by Chittarvu Madhu (from Telugu)
- Ramaswamy, S. R. (1994) – Dunkel Akramakke Parihara: Swadeshi Jagruti
- Ramaswamy, S. R. (1996) – Bharatiya Chitta, Manasa, Kala by Dharmapal (from Hindi)
- Ramaswamy, S. R. (1996) – Kattiyalugina Setuve by Panuganti (from Telugu)
- Ramaswamy, S. R. (1997) – Sevapatha by Brajendrapal Singh (from Hindi)
- Ramaswamy, S. R. (1998) – Bye Bye Poloniya by Chittarvu Madhu (from Telugu)
- Ramaswamy, S. R. (2001) – Houde..? by Chittarvu Madhu (from Telugu)
- Ramaswamy, S. R. (2002) – Jedare Bale by Chittarvu Madhu (from Telugu)
- Ramaswamy, S. R. (2005) – Shilube Mattu Kodavaru by K. B. Ganapati (from English)
- Ramaswamy, S. R. (2007) – Anandamatha by Bankim Chandra (from Hindi)
- Ramaswamy, S. R. (2008) – Roopayigalu Baruttave, Jagruti! by Prabhakar Jaini (from Telugu)
- Ramaswamy, S. R. (2011) – Endu Yava Anubhandavo by Akumuri Muralikrishna (from Telugu)
- Ramaswamy, S. R. (2012) – Vishwaprayatna by Akumuri Muralikrishna (from Telugu)
- Ramaswamy, S. R. (2012) – Vanasuma
- Ramaswamy, S. R. (2013) – Target Number Two by G. Nageshwara Rao

=== List of Lectures ===
- Ramaswamy, S. R. (1972) – Vellala Kavi Parampare
- Ramaswamy, S. R. (1972) – S. Srikanta Sastrigala Bahumuka Parampare
- Ramaswamy, S. R. (1972) – Critique of Paul Valéry
- Ramaswamy, S. R. (1975) – Copy – Editing
- Ramaswamy, S. R. (1977) – Sharathchandra
- Ramaswamy, S. R. (1983) – Life of Soliga Tribals
- Ramaswamy, S. R. (1984) – State of Land Reforms
- Ramaswamy, S. R. (1987) – Feature Writing & Development Journalism
- Ramaswamy, S. R. (1988) – Social Costs of Social Forestry
- Ramaswamy, S. R. (1990) – Towards Understanding Hindu Society
- Ramaswamy, S. R. (1992) – Gandhian Concept of Ecology
- Ramaswamy, S. R. (1993) – Alternative Life Vision: An Economic Perspective
- Ramaswamy, S. R. (1993) – Text – A Critical Study of the Mahabharata
- Ramaswamy, S. R. (1993) – Hindu Economics
- Ramaswamy, S. R. (1995) – Towards Humanistic Economies
- Ramaswamy, S. R. (1996) – United Nations in Retrospect
- Ramaswamy, S. R. (1996) – Netaji Subhas Chandra Bose
- Ramaswamy, S. R. (1998) – The Regime of Sir Mirza Ismail
- Ramaswamy, S. R. (1998) – The Concept of Development
- Ramaswamy, S. R. (1998) – Relevance of Swadeshi Movement
- Ramaswamy, S. R. (1998) – Life and Work of V. Sitaramaiah
- Ramaswamy, S. R. (2001) – A Decade of Globalisation
- Ramaswamy, S. R. (2002) – Intellectual Pollution
- Ramaswamy, S. R. (2003) – Journalism Today
- Ramaswamy, S. R. (2005) – Swadeshi Movement of 1905: Historic Turning Point
- Ramaswamy, S. R. (2007) – Saga of Patriotism: Martyrs in Freedom Movement
- Ramaswamy, S. R. (2007) – Foreign Friends of India's Freedom Movement
- Ramaswamy, S. R. (2010) – Contribution of Rallapalli Ananta Krishna Sharma
- Ramaswamy, S. R. (2011) – Life and Work of D. V. Gundappa
- Ramaswamy, S. R. (2013) – Contribution of Sanskritist Prof S. K. Ramachandra Rao
- Ramaswamy. S. R. (2013) – Belagere Krishna Sastri

== Recognition ==
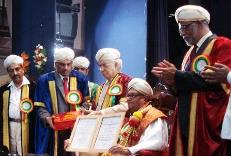
S. R. Ramaswamy receiving Honorary Doctorate from Karnataka State Open University (KSOU)

S. R. Ramaswamy's vast contribution to the world of journalism, literature, criticism and social activism have earned him many awards and accolades over the years. A few of these awards are listed here:

- "Canara Bank Award" First prize for article on "The Life of Soliga Tribals" (1983)
- "Canara Bank Award" First prize for article on "State of Land Reforms" (1984)

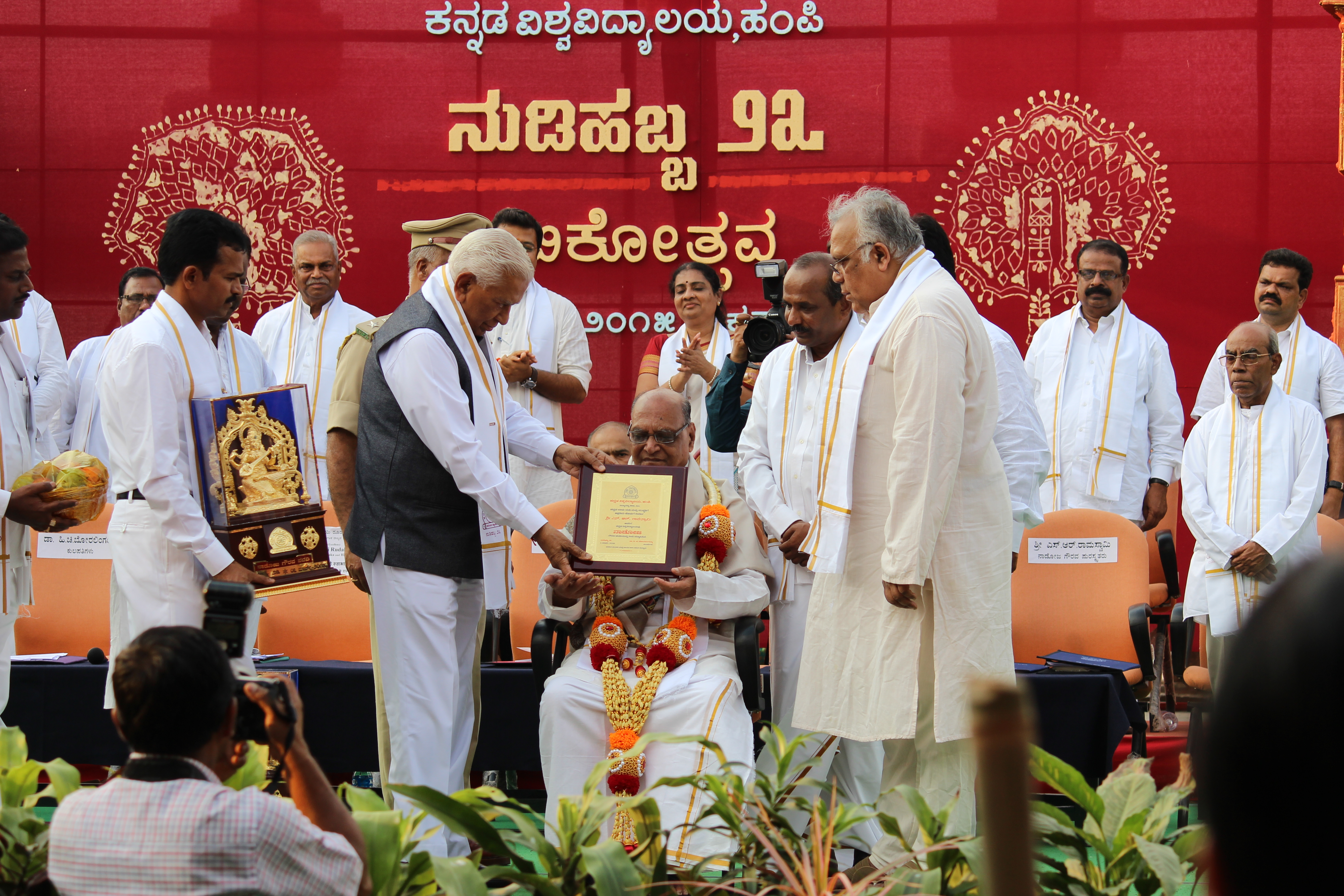
S. R. Ramaswamy receiving 'Nadoja' Felicitation from Hampi University, India

- "Karnataka Sahitya Akademi Award" for "Shatamanada Tiruvinalli Bharata" (1989) as best work written in Social Science (1992)
- "Aryabhata Award" for Journalism (2006)
- "Karnataka Rajyotsava Prashasti" for Contribution to Literature (2008)
- "Mythic Society Centenary Award" for Scholastic Achievements (2009)
- Honorary Doctorate 'D. Litt' from Karnataka State Open University for Lifetime Contribution to Literature & Journalism (2011) (pictured right)
- Karnataka Madhyama Academy "Person of the Year" Award for five decades of service to Journalism (2011)
- D. V. G Award – conferred by The D. V. G Balaga, Mysore
- "Nadoja" Award – Conferred by Hampi University, Karnataka (2015) (pictured left)
