= Rallapalli Ananta Krishna Sharma =

Indian composer (1893–1979)

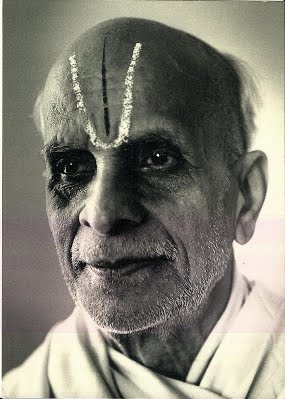
- Born: 23 January 1893; Rallapalli, Kambadur taluq, Anantapur district, Andhra Pradesh
- Died: 11 March 1979 (aged 86); Bangalore, Karnataka
- Occupation: Telugu pandit
- Spouse: Rukminamma
- Children: 5
- Writing career
- Genres: Composer, Writer, Scholar
- Subjects: Carnatic Music, Telugu, Kannada, Samskrit & Prakrit
- Notable awards: Sangita Kalanidhi
- Website: Rallapalli Ananta Krishna Sharma

Rallapalli Ananta Krishna Sharma (23 January 1893 – 11 March 1979) was a noted composer of Carnatic music, singer, Telugu literature, teacher and Sanskrit scholar. He was responsible for discovering and cataloguing many forgotten compositions of Annamacharya. These compositions revived by Sharma would be sung by successive singers like S. P. Balasubramanyam and M. S. Subbalakshmi, popularizing the songs.

Sharma authored prose works like Vemana, Natakopanyasamulu, Ganakale, Sahitya Mattu Jeevana Kale and Saraswatalokamu. He also translated 395 (out of 700) Gathas from original Prakrit into Telugu language titled Shalivahana Gatha Sapta Saramu in 1931. Sharma is the recipient of Central Sangeet & Natak Academy Fellowship (1973), Gana Kala Sindhu (1961), Gana Kala Prapoorna (1969), Sangeeta Kala Ratna (1974) and Sangeeta Sahitya Asthan Vidwan honours along with an Honorary Doctorate from TTD University, Andhra Pradesh.

== Early life ==
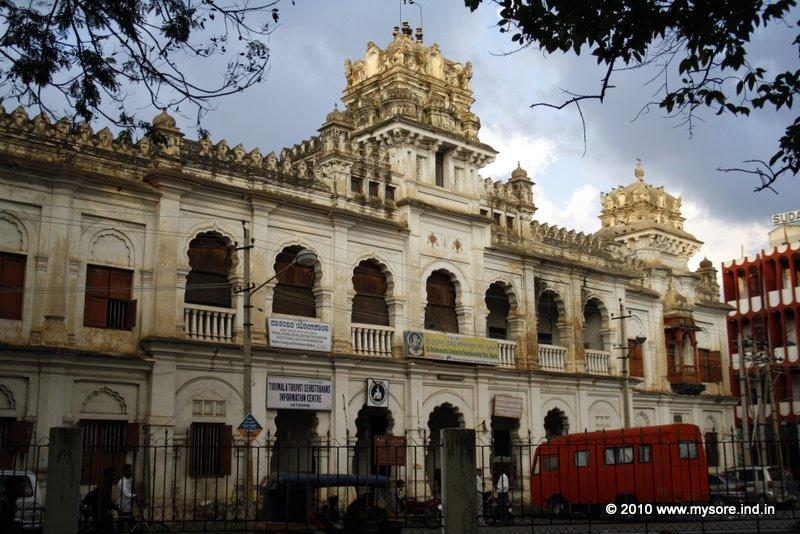
Parakala Matha (Religious Monastery in Mysore)

Rallapalli Ananta Krishna Sharma was born on 23 January 1893 to Karnamadakala Krishnamacharya and Alamelu Mangamma. He was born in Rallapalli village in Kambadur taluk, Anantapur district, Andhra Pradesh. Sharma and his sister Yadugiramma used to sing religious hymns inside the local fort at Rallapalli.

Sharma arrived in Mysore in 1905 at the age of twelve years and spent a year at Parakala Matha under the guidance of Krishnabrahmatantra Swamy. Sharma helped Swamy in bringing out 'Alankara Manihara' - a treatise on Alankara Sastra. After his tenure at Parakala Matha, he went to Pandit Ramashastry in Chamarajanagar to learn Sanskrit. Later, in 1911, he married Rukminamma. Sharma lacked formal college or university education, but his proficiency in the traditional Sastras and musical compositions became his main strength. He composed his first Sanskrit composition at the age of 14 years. It was a composition dedicated to Goddess Lakshmi titled 'Jalarashi Balelole'.

== Musical training ==
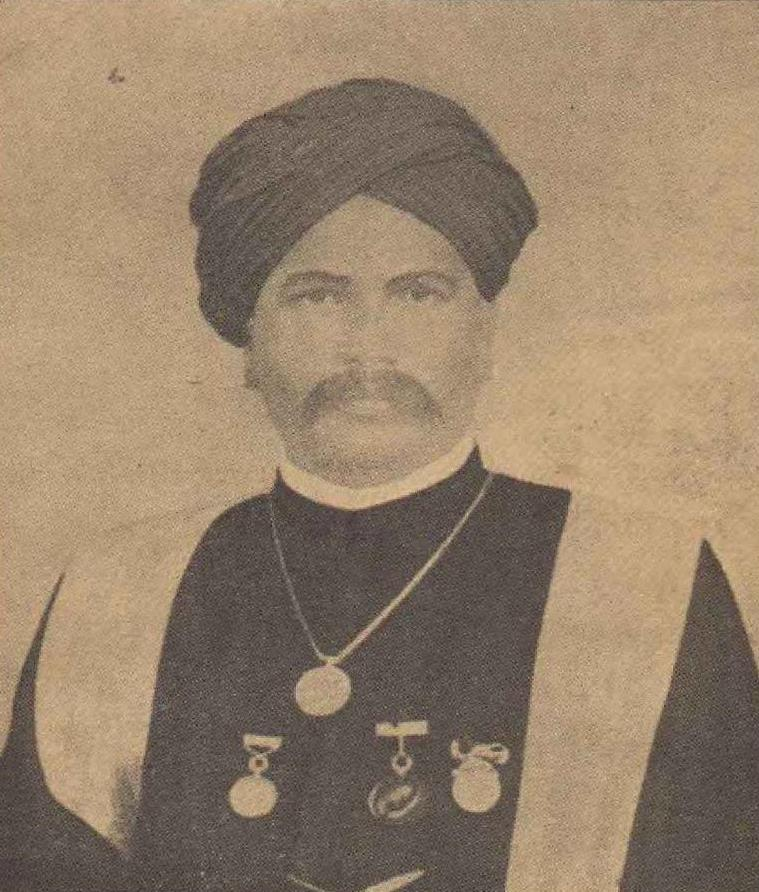
Bidaram Krishnappa

While in Mysore, Sharma frequently visited Carnatic musical concerts by Veena Seshanna, Veena Subbanna, Karigiraya, Mysore Vasudevacharya, Bidaram Krishnappa and Chikka Ramaraya. He repeatedly attempted to persuade them to take him as a formal student of music but was unsuccessful. Finally, Bidaram Krishnappa agreed to teach Carnatic music to him. Krishnappa convinced Sharma not to participate in public expositions of his music in concerts and so on. When Muthiah Bhagavatar wanted to arrange a private concert for the ruling Maharaja of Mysore - Nalwadi Krishna Raja Wodeyar, Sharma declined it.

== Teacher ==
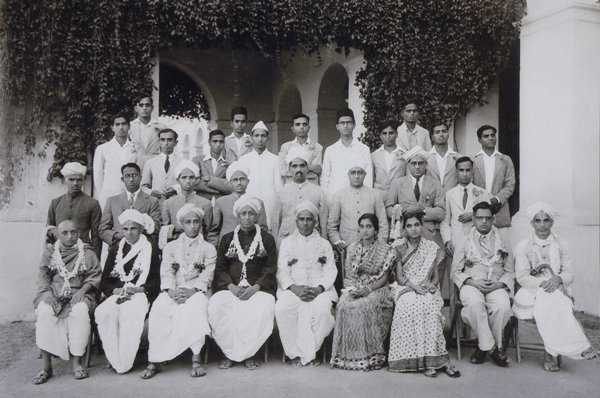
Maharaja College, Mysore (1940) Faculty: Sitting row-left to right M. H. Krishna (third from left), A. R. Krishnasastry (fourth from left), S. Srikanta Sastri (seventh from left), Rallapalli Anantha Krishna Sharma (eighth from left), Standing-bottom row-V. Seetharamaiah (fourth from left) and D. L. Narasimhachar (seventh from left)

Sharma was appointed a Telugu Pundit (a scholar) by Sir Cattamanchi Ramalinga Reddy, principal of the Maharaja College of Mysore, in 1912 and worked there until 1949. After teaching, he joined the Sri Venkateshwara Oriental Research Centre, Tirupathi. The then executive officer of Tirumala Tirupati Devasthanams, Chelikani Anna Rao entrusted Sharma with simplifying the compositions of the songwriter-singer-saint Tallapaka Annamacharya. These compositions (or kritis) were stored for centuries in the Tirumala temple Bhandagaram (storehouse) on copper plates. Sharma was assigned the task after his predecessor, Veturi Prabhakara Sastry, died. He worked on tuning the songs and helped publish the seventh and eighth volumes of Annamacharya's compositions. Sharma went on to edit nearly 300 compositions and brought out five more volumes of compositions between 1951 and 1956. He also wrote the notation for 108 compositions, 87 of which were published in the Andhra Patrika.

Sharma was closely associated with eminent journalist, biographer and writer S. R. Ramaswamy who learnt for a period of time the nuances of Carnatic music from him. Among his students were D. L. Narasimhachar, M. Chidananada Murthy, K. V. Puttappa, G. P. Raja Ratnam, M. V. Seetharamaiah, T. S. Shama Rao, B. Kuppuswami, G. S. Shivarudrappa, Banagiri Lakshmi Narasimhachar and M. S. Venkata Rao.

Akasavani: While living in Mysore, he was approached by an All India Radio engineer V V Gopalaswami who built a home radio in his residence. Sharma was requested to suggest a name for the radio. Drawing parallels with Hindu mythology where the will of the gods is said to be heard only through a voice called Akasavani, Sharma suggested the name Akasavani for the radio station. This was later officially adapted by All India Radio.

== Major works ==
- Ananta Bharati (collection of Sanskrit works)
- Meerabai (1913) (Telugu Khanda Kavya)
- Taradevi (1911) (Telugu Khanda Kavya)
- Vemana Natakopanyasamulu (1928–29)
- Shalivahana Gatasaptashati Saramu (1932) (translation work from the Prakrit into Telugu)
- Saraswatalokamu (1954)
- Chayapa Senaniya, Nrita Ratnavali (1969) (Translation into Telugu)
- Arya (1970) (Translation of Sanskrit work of Sundara Pandya into Telugu)
- Natakopanyasamulu

== Literary works in Kannada ==
- Ganakale (1952),
- Sahitya Mattu Jeevana Kale (1954 )
- a few published talk.

== Awards ==
- He was honored as "Astana Vidwan" by Tirumala Tirupati Devasthanams in 1979
- "Sangita Kalanidhi" in 1974
- Honorary Doctorate (D.Litt.) by Sri Venkateswara University, Tirupathi in 1974
- "Ganakala Sindhu" at Sangeeta Sammelan organized by Sri Prasanna Seetarama Mandiram, Mysore in 1961
- "Gana Kala Prapurna" by Andhra Pradesh Sangeeta Nataka Academy
- "Sangeeta Kalaratna" by Bangalore Gayana Samaj

== Death & Legacy ==
Sharma died on 11 March 1979 in Bangalore and was survived by three daughters and two sons. On 23 August 2008, his life-size bronze statue was installed in Tirupathi. The Birth Centenary Celebrations of Sharma were organized in 1993. A Centenary Souvenir was edited by Medasani Mohan and published by Tirumala Tirupati Devasthanams in 1994.
