= Mulukanadu Brahmin =

Subgroup of Telugu-speaking Vaidiki Smartha Brahmins

Mulukanadu/Murikinadu Brahmin
Religion
- Hinduism of the Smarta tradition.

The Mulukanadu Brahmins are a sub-group of Telugu-speaking Vaidiki Smartha Brahmins. Variations of the name of the community include: Murikinadu, Muluknadu, Mulukanadu, Mulakanadu, Moolakanadu and Mulikinadu.

== Etymology ==
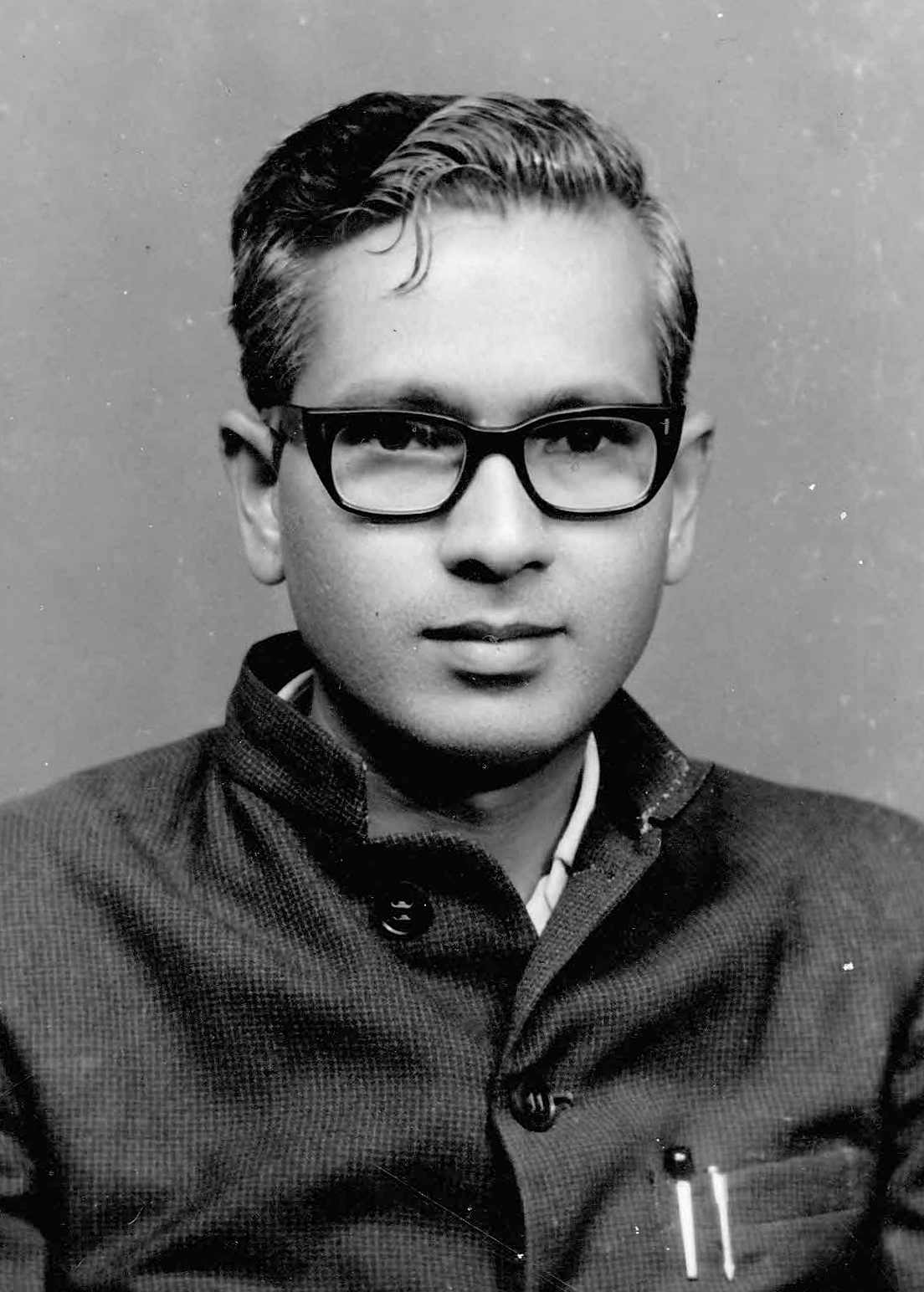
T. V. Venkatachala Sastry

The name Mulukanadu follows the usual conjoint formulation of Brahmin communities: the word Naadu means "country" in all the south Indian languages; this is suffixed to the country whence the community hails, being in this case "Muluka". Thus, Muluka+Naadu=Mulukanadu, "people of the Muluka land." Muluka or Mulaka is identified and it is also known as Moolaka or Moolaka desa along with Asmaka in Satavahana regime.

T. V. Venkatachala Sastry's study of caste genealogy and sociology titled Mulukanadu Brahmanaru, in Kannada language, traces the genealogy of the Mulukanadu sect and its origins, customs and prevailing cultures.

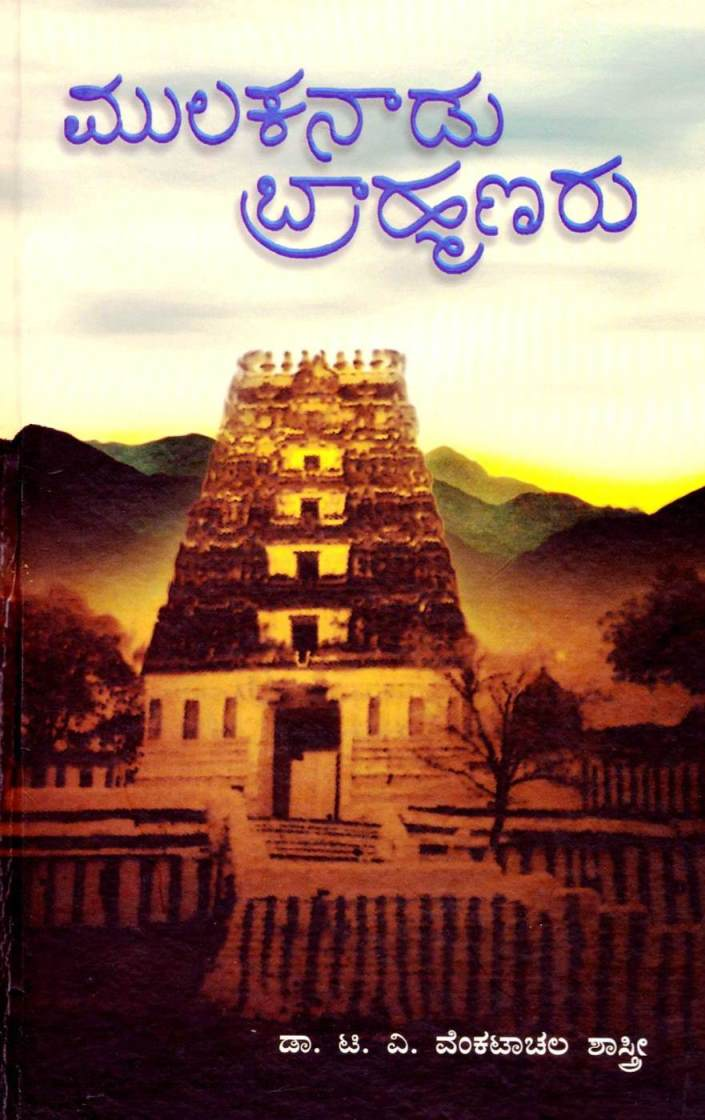
Mulukanadu Brahmanaru - Coverpage

Mulukanadu has been called variously across an assorted array of inscriptions found in the region. The Brahmin community from this sect has an incessant relationship with the Telugu language and it can be deduced that the region corresponding to the origin of this sect is the middle Pennar region which is based entirely in the Cuddapah district. The area is itself known under different names during different periods of time. Dommaranandyala plates inscribed by Punyakumara mentions this region as Hiranya Rashtra. The first inscription that explicitly talks about Mulkinadu is of the Rashtrakuta king Krishna in Pushpagiri as Mulkinadu naidu maharajyam. Along with Mulkinadu, various other locations in the vicinity are called Renadu, Marjavadi, Pottapinadu, Pedanadu and so on.

There is another inscription by the king Kayastha Ambadeva (this is the same king who reigned the southern region of the Andhra Pradesh under the Kakatiya ruler Rudrama Devi) dated Saka 1214 corresponding to 1292 CE. Along with Mulkinadu, he also refers to other regions Penavadi, Pulivendla (present day Pulivendula), Sirivodu and Pottapi.

Another king of the Kakatiya dynasty Prataparudra who ruled between 1289 CE and 1323 CE had got inscribed in his Chanduvayi inscription in the Siddhavatam Taluk of Cuddapah district about the region of Mulikinadu in the year 1319 CE. The fact that these inscriptions also refer to other regions that are close by attests that the region Mulkinadu or Mulukanadu is indeed a region in Cuddapah district.

Badaganadu Brahmin is a term used for Brahmins who reside in Karnataka and in Tamil Nadu

== List of Popular Mulukanadu Brahmins ==
- T. V. Venkatachala Sastry
- S. Srikanta Sastri
- Ramasesha Sastri
- M. Visvesvaraya
- S. R. Ramaswamy

== See also ==
- Advaita Vedanta
- Forward Castes
