= N. S. Subba Rao =

Indian professor and vice chancellor (1885–1943)

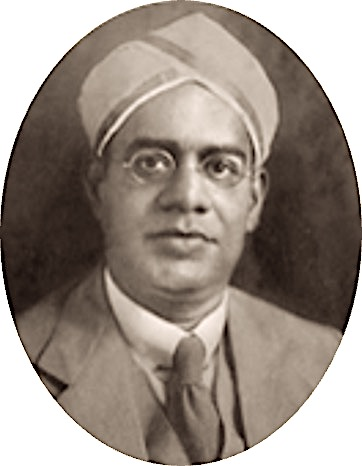
- N. S. Subba Rao
- Born: Nanjanagud Subbaraya Subba Rao; 14 March 1885; Srirangapatna, Kingdom of Mysore
- Died: 29 June 1943 (aged 58); Bangalore, India
- Education: Maharaja's College, Mysore
- Occupations: Economist; Principal; Vice Chancellor; Educationist
- Writing career
- Language: Kannada, English, French, Latin
- Period: 1910 - 1942
- Notable awards: Rajakaryapraveena of the Gandabherunda Order
- Website: N. S. Subba Rao

Nanjanagud Subbaraya Subba Rao (14 March 1885 – 29 June 1943) was a professor of economics at Maharaja College, Mysore. He later became Principal of Maharaja College, Mysore and retired as the Vice Chancellor of University of Mysore from 1937 - 42. Subba Rao was a student of Alfred Marshall at Saint John's College, Cambridge, between 1905 and 1909 where he completed his M. A. Tripos exam and Bar-at-Law qualification. N. S. Subba Rao was a contemporary of John Maynard Keynes and Arthur Cecil Pigou and had a close working relationship with both of them for nearly two decades. Among the prominent contributions of N. S. Subba Rao are The Scouts and Guides Movement, Mysore University Co-operative Society, establishment of University and Central Libraries, Taxation Reforms both at Central and State level, Educational Reforms in the form of instituting Kannada medium of instruction in high schools, Founding of the first modern Yoga School at Mysore (by helping Tirumalai Krishnamacharya), Economic Reforms through his contributions at the London Round Table Conference (1930–32) along with Sir Mirza Ismail leading to the eventual formulation of the 'Indian Constitution Act' (1935) and lastly in the recruitment of future literary scholars and writers like M. Hiriyanna, G. P. Rajarathnam, S. Srikanta Sastri, Kuvempu, T. S. Venkannayya and A. R. Krishna Shastry as faculty at the nascent University.

== Early years ==
N. S. Subba Rao was born in Srirangapatna, Mysore on 14 March 1885. His father Nanjanagud Subbaraya was a lawyer by profession. Subba Rao had an elder brother N. Narasimha Murthy who was an officer in British Resident Sir Stuart Milford Fraser's office at Mysore. His younger sister was Kaveramma. Subba Rao completed his matriculation exam at Srirangapatna and then moved to Central College, Bangalore for his F. A. course. Here, he was a student of John Guthrie Tait (J. G. Tait) - the eminent Scottish educator and later Principal of Central College, Bangalore. At the end of the F. A. course, Tate recommended Subba Rao to Rev. William Skinner and Rev. Earle Monteith MacPhail at Madras Christian College, Madras for his B. A. degree. Subba Rao completed his B. A. in 1904 with a gold medal. Subsequent to this, the Mysore Government extended the 'Damodar Das Educational Scholarship' to enable his further education at Cambridge.

== Education in England ==
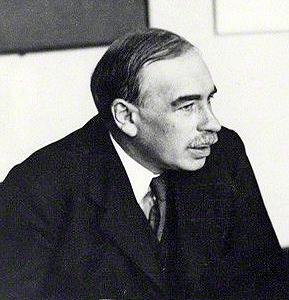
John Maynard Keynes (1933)

N. S. Subba Rao was at St. John's College, Cambridge from 1905 to 1909. He was a student of Alfred Marshall and studied economics, political science and European history. His contemporaries here included John Maynard Keynes and Arthur Cecil Pigou. Subba Rao published an essay titled "Political and Economic conditions of Ancient India, as described in the Jatakas", which won him the prestigious Le Bas award in 1909. He completed his Tripos exam at Cambridge (M. A. Cantab.) while simultaneously finishing his Bar-at-Law qualification. During his four years in England, Subba Rao toured France, Germany and a few other European nations before returning to India on 28 October 1909. His close friendship with Keynes was something he treasured for years to come. Both Keynes and Subba Rao maintained a close correspondence for nearly two decades. Keynes even recommended Subba Rao's name to the India Office at Calcutta for a high position in the British India Government - an offer which Subba Rao had to kindly decline owing to his sense of obligation to the Mysore Government and Royalty which had funded his higher education at Cambridge for four years. Keynes described Subba Rao as a "Good Marshallian of the Orthodox Sect".

An excerpt from a letter from Subba Rao to Maynard Keynes:

"My dearest Keynes, I found that a good many officers in the Secretariat (in the Mysore State Government Offices) had read your papers in the ‘Economic Journal’ and in the ‘Madras Mail’ – which surprised me, as we do not pretend to be up to date here! I miss Cambridge itself. I did not think I had become so fond of the place…. You will not believe me if I tell you how often I am back at Cambridge in my waking thoughts and dreams – with kindest regards, yours sincerely – N. S. Subba Rao".

== Return to India ==
N. S. Subba Rao returned to India on 28 October 1909. In 1910, he was appointed as a lecturer in Economics at Maharaja College, Mysore. Here, in addition to Economics, Subba Rao taught Political Science, European History and English Literature as well. Among his foremost students here was the future Kannada writer and poet V. Seetharamaiah. The University of Mysore came into existence on 27 July 1916. N. S. Subba Rao took charge as Principal of Maharaja College, Mysore from C. R. Reddy on 24 September 1917 and held the post till 1928.

== University years ==
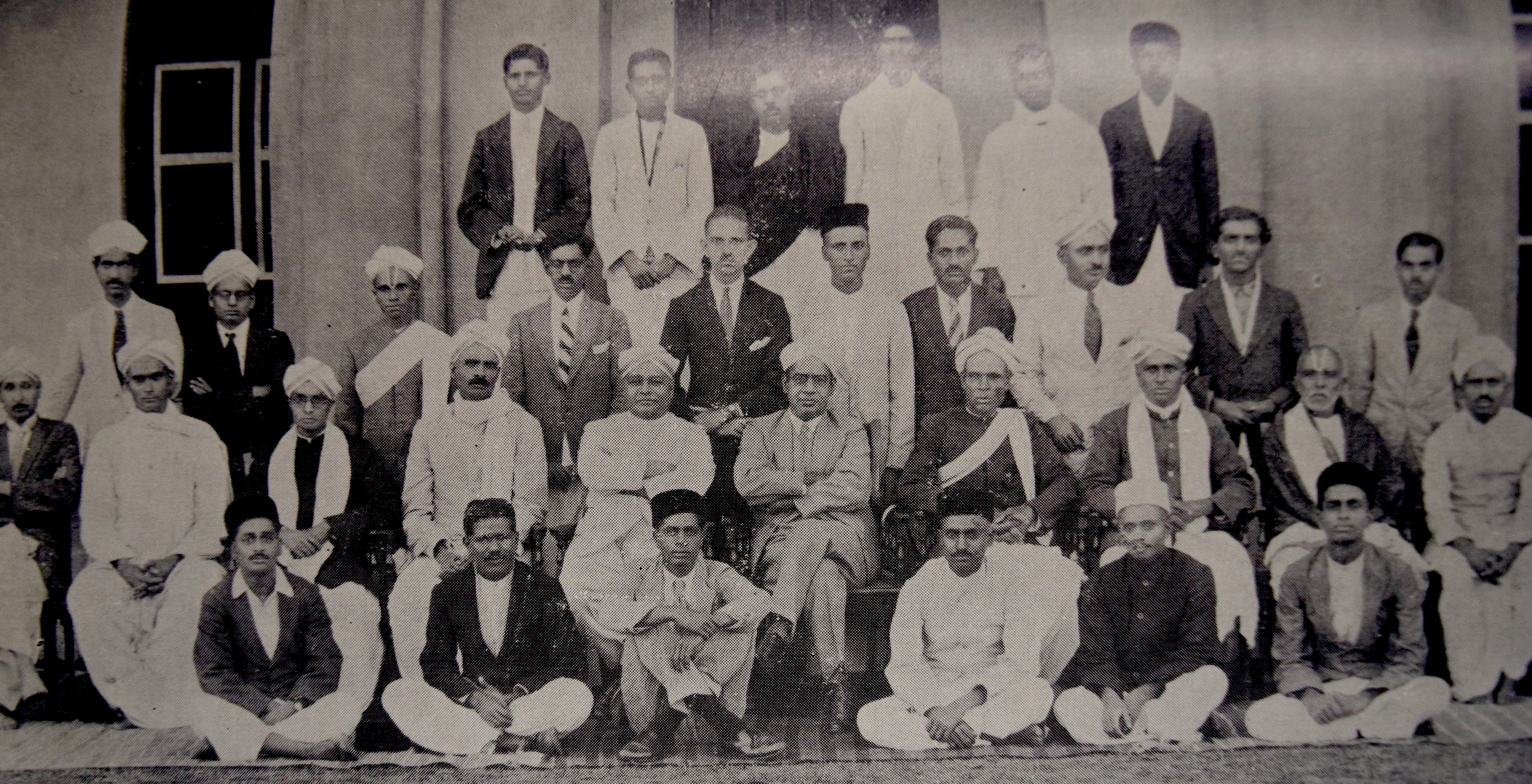
Sitting on Chairs: L – R: 1. M. R. Sreenivasa Murthy 2. A. N. Narasimaiah 3. B. Venkobachar 4. T. S. Venkannayya 5. B. M. Srikantaiah 6. N. S. Subba Rao 7. B. Venkatanaranappa 8. ? 9. Tiruvallur Sreenivasa Raghavacharya 10. V. Seetharamaiah Standing behind chairs: L – R: 1. Nittoor Sreenivasa Rao 2. K. Anantaramaiah 3. M. R. Varadachar 8. P. Sreenivasa Rao Sitting on floor: 4. K. Gopalakrishna Rao

N. S. Subba Rao was a founding member and first professor in the newly established economics department at the nascent University of Mysore. N. S. Subba Rao was instrumental in founding a dedicated publishing division in the University of Mysore by the name of Prasaranga. In 1919, N. S. Subba Rao was invited to Ceylon to foresee the establishment of the State University in Ceylon. In July 1927, N. S. Subba Rao delivered many prominent papers on Economics and Administration in the National Educational Conference as representative of the Mysore Government. These papers won him favourable reviews by K. Myathen and E. G. McAlpine. Subba Rao founded the Mysore University Co-operative Society in 1923 to offer financial aid for the teaching fraternity. He introduced Kannada medium of instruction in High Schools across the state in July 1935. Subba Rao was Vice Chancellor of the University of Mysore and Chairman of the Academic Council from 1937 - 42. He played a key role in convincing S. Srikanta Sastri to take up writing "Sources of Karnataka History, Vol I" and getting it eventually published in 1940. Subba Rao chaired a meeting with Thomas Denham and Radha Kumudh Mukherjee in 1918 towards establishment of Mysore University library. Along with B. M. Srikantaiah and M. Venkatakrishnayya, Subba Rao took a keen interest in the establishment of the Mysore Government Central Library at Mysore. His idea for starting a "College Library Scholarship Fund" was a boon for many a poor student at the university. N. S. Subba Rao prevailed on A. R. Krishna Shastry, who was then Editor of "Prabhuddha Karnataka" to widen the magazine's horizons by including non-literary articles and to include contributions from readers outside the Mysore Princely State area. N. S. Subba Rao was responsible for recruiting many a future literary stalwart into the university as faculty. This was testament to his keen eye for academic talent and his administrative acumen in recruiting them into the university. This list includes the likes of M. Hiriyanna, G. P. Rajarathnam, S. Srikanta Sastri, T. S. Venkannayya, Kuvempu and A. N. Murthy Rao among others.

== Socio-political and economic reforms ==
Under Sir Brajendranath Seal's Vice Chancellorship, Subba Rao was a member of the Council for Political Reforms (1926–27). As Member of the Textile Tariff Board, Subba Rao was able to bring his vast Economics knowledge and experience in solving many of the tariff issues. He accompanied Diwan Sir Mirza Ismail to the London Round Table Conference (1930–32) and played a crucial role in the subsequent formulation of The Indian Constitution Act of 1935. Subba Rao presided as Secretary of Mythic Society, Bangalore from 1939 to 1942 and was instrumental in arranging many historical seminars during his tenure. This was in addition to him expanding the Mythic Society library which now holds a significant number of old inscriptions and epigraphical records. Subba Rao persuaded Maharaja Nalvadi Krishna Raja Wodeyar to allot a portion of the present day Jagan Mohan Palace at Mysore to Yoga exponent Tirumalai Krishnamacharya thus paving the way for the first formal School of Yoga in the Princely State of Mysore.

== Lectures and collected writings ==
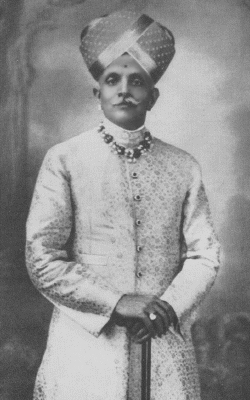
Nalvadi Krishnaraja Wodeyar (1881-1940)

In 1910, Subba Rao delivered a lecture at Mythic Society, Bangalore elaborating on the paper which had won him the 'Le Bas' award at Cambridge. This was later published in the Quarterly Journal of Mythic Society (QJMS) Issue of 1910 and later by Wesleyan Mission Press in 1911. Subba Rao's foreword to M. N. Srinivas' "Marriage and Family in Mysore" published in 1942 is considered a seminal work for its depth and understanding of the prevalent sociological realities of Mysore state. N. S. Subba Rao's monograph on changing realities of Education in India came forth under the title of "Education in Changing India" in 1933. His essay on Vocational Training in India came forth under the title of "Vocational Education" in 1932. N. S. Subba Rao delivered a series of lectures as part of the Sir William Meyer Lectures Series from 1932 - 33 at Madras on "Some Aspects of Economic Planning".These were later published by Bangalore Press in 1935. Subba Rao delivered a guest lecture at the 'Indian Economic Association', Allahabad in 1929. In 1940, Subba Rao delivered the inaugural address of 'All India Economic and Political Congress' at Mysore. In 1943, he delivered ten lectures on 'Rural Reconstruction in India' at Delhi University as part of 'Sir Kikibhai Premchand Lecture Series'.

== Recognition ==
In recognition of a lifetime of contribution to the Princely State of Mysore, the Maharaja of Mysore Nalwadi Krishna Raja Wodeyar conferred on N. S. Subba Rao the 'Rajakaryapraveena of the Gandabherunda Order' in 1937. The University of Mysore has instituted 'The N. S. Subba Rao Cash Prize' to the student with the highest marks in the M. A. Economics each year. Poet Laureate Rabindranath Tagore had a fond relationship with N. S. Subba Rao through their many correspondences and even introduced him at one of the International Conferences as a "Prince Among Men!". N. S. Subba Rao was appointed as Honorary Secretary of 'Inter-University Association' from 1923 - 25. He presided over the 'All India Educational Conference' in 1931. N. S. Subba Rao also presided over the Kannada Sahitya Sammelan at Bombay in December 1935.

== Death ==
N. S. Subba Rao died on 29 June 1943 at the age of 58 years at Bangalore.

== Bibliography ==
- Venkatachala Sastry, T. V. (2019). ಬದುಕು, ಬರೆಹ, ನೆನಪು - ಉಪಕುಲಪತಿ ಏನ್. ಎಸ್. ಸುಬ್ಬರಾಯರು (Biography of N. S. Subba Rao) (in Kannada). Bangalore: Vasantha Prakashana. pp. 10–14.
- Murty, Vohra; K. Satchidananda, Ashok. (1989). Radhakrishnan - His Life and Ideas. State University of New York Press. p. 17. ISBN 978-1-4384-1401-0.
- Sondekoppam Naganath, Bhagirath. (2021). Memorable Mysoreans - A Collection of Biographical Sketches. Notion Press Media Pvt. Ltd. p. 54. ISBN 978-1-68509-787-5.
- Chandavarkar, Anand, (1989). Keynes: The Guru. Keynes and India: A Study in Economics and Biography, Keynesian Studies, London: Palgrave Macmillan UK, pp. 150–179, ISBN 978-0-230-37477-5.
- Chandavarkar, Anand, (1983). Keynes and India: A Centennial Review and Appraisal. Economic and Political Weekly. 18 (28): 1233–1237. ISSN 0012-9976.
- Keynes, John Maynard. Keynes Writings on India. Cambridge, United Kingdom: Cambridge University Press. pp. 5, 6.
- Singleton, Mark (2010). Yoga Body - The Origins of Modern Posture Practice. USA: Oxford University Press. p. 177. ISBN 978-0-19-974598-2.
- Srinivas, M. N. (1942). Marriage and family in Mysore. Bombay: New Book Co.
- Mandelbaum; M. Albert; Lasker, David Goodman; Ethel; Gabriel Ward (1963). Resources for the Teaching of Anthropology-Volumes 95–96. California, USA: University of California Press. p. 206.
- Sondekoppam Naganath, Bhagirath. (2022). A Visionary Educationist of Mysore - Rajakaryapraveena N. S. Subba Rao. Star of Mysore Newspaper, Mysore, p. 6
- Tait, John Guthrie (1920–32). Tait Papers - Archives of University of Cambridge (Centre of South Asian Studies)
