= M. H. Krishna =

Indian historian and archaeologist

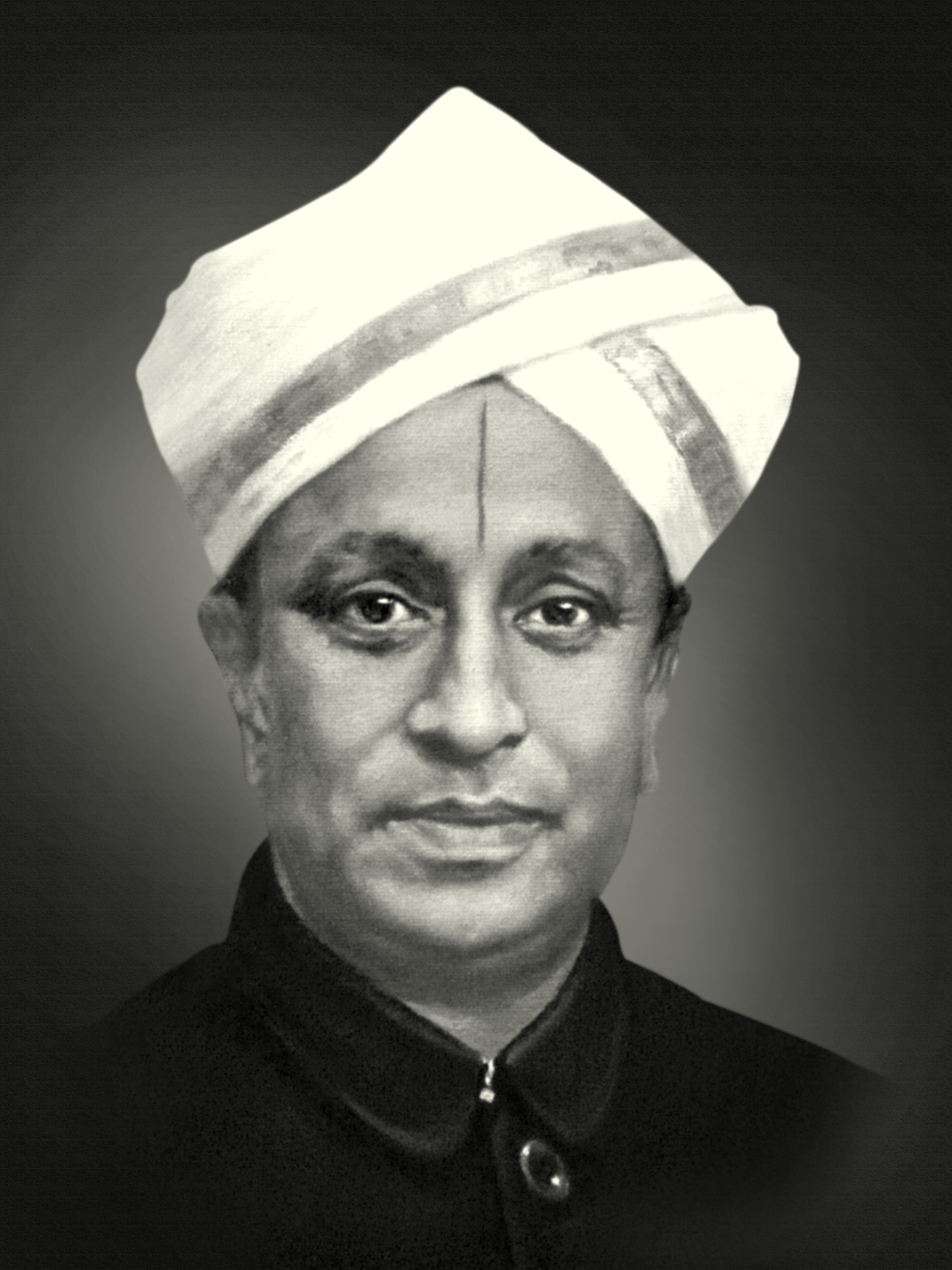
- Born: 19 August 1892; Mysore
- Died: 23 December 1947 (aged 55); Mysore
- Known for: Epigraphia Carnatica, Halmidi Inscription, Isila city discovery, Discovery of Shivaji's father's tomb
- Spouse(s): Rajamma, Jayamma

Academic background
- Education: Maharaja College, Mysore
- Academic advisors: Radha Kumud Mukherjee, Brajendranath Seal, Flinders Petrie, Ernest Arthur Gardner

Academic work
- Discipline: History, Archaeology, Indology, Numismatics, Epigraphy
- Institutions: University of Mysore
- Notable students: S. Srikanta Sastri, G. Venkatasubbiah, M. Chidananda Murthy, Chaduranga, Jayachamarajendra Wadiyar
- Website: M. H. Krishna

Mysore Hatti Krishna Iyengar (M. H. Krishna: 19 August 1892 – 23 December 1947) was an Indian historian, archaeologist, epigraphist and authority in Indian numismatics. He pioneered the new field of Indology involving the study of Indian culture, history, music and traditions from a historical perspective. He is credited with the discovery of one of the oldest Kannada inscriptions, the Halmidi inscription, dating back to 350 A. D. He also discovered the remains of the city of Isila near Brahmagiri during his excavations at Chandravalli, Chitradurga. The forgotten tomb of Shahaji (Shivaji's father) was traced by M. H. Krishna during his years at the Mysore Archaeological Department. His years at the Archaeology Department saw him churn out many of excavation reports (close to 2000 inscriptions discovered) and these were later published in successive volumes of Epigraphia Carnatica. During Krishna's tenure at Bangalore, he was instrumental in cataloguing close to 6000 coins in the archives of the archaeology department there. He was trained at the University College, London under Ernest Arthur Gardner. and would later accompany Sir Flinders Petrie in his excavations in Egypt.

== Early years ==
Krishna was born in Mysore to parents Ranga Iyengar and Lakshmamma. Ranga Iyengar was a Sanskrit scholar and a teacher to Nalwadi Krishna Raja Wodeyar during the Maharaja's childhood. He was also chief treasurer of the Mysore Palace. They were natives of a region in Karnataka by name Kalale (Kannada: ಕಳಲೆ).

Krishna had his schooling at Jayacharya Patashala and Wesleyan Mission High School, Mysore. Here, he was a contemporary of Masti Venkatesha Iyengar. He finished his B. A. in 1911 from Maharaja College, Mysore. By 1917, Krishna secured a M. A. qualification from Madras University. For the next two years, he worked as lecturer in history at the Maharaja College, Mysore. In 1919, Krishna was made a member of the Royal Asiatic Society, London. The then Vice Chancellor of University of Mysore Brajendranath Seal and Head of the Department of History, Maharaja College - Radha Kumud Mukherjee were impressed with M. H. Krishna's aptitude in Numismatics and Epigraphy and deputed him to Bangalore, Archaeology Office for the cataloguing of close to 6000 coins in their archives there (1920 -1922).

By 1924, Krishna was sponsored for higher studies to University College, London. Here, he was guided in his research by |Ernest Arthur Gardiner. Apart from Gardiner, he was under the tutelage of L. D. Barnett, Sir Flinders Petrie, Eliot Smith, Seligman, W. J. Perry and Edvard Westermarck. Krishna accompanied Flinders Petrie on his Egyptian excavations. He made use of his time in Europe to visit and study collections of South Indian interest at the British Museum, the Ashmolean Museum, Oxford, the Fitzwilliam Collection, Cambridge, the National Museum, Paris and the Kaiser Friedrich Museum, Berlin. He submitted his theses Deccan Numismatics for publication to the Royal Institute at this time. Krishna was invited to deliver a series of public lectures on Indian History and Archaeology. He delivered about seven lectures in 1926. He was eventually made Fellow of Royal Numismatics Society and Royal Anthropological Institute, London.

== University of Mysore and Archaeology Department ==
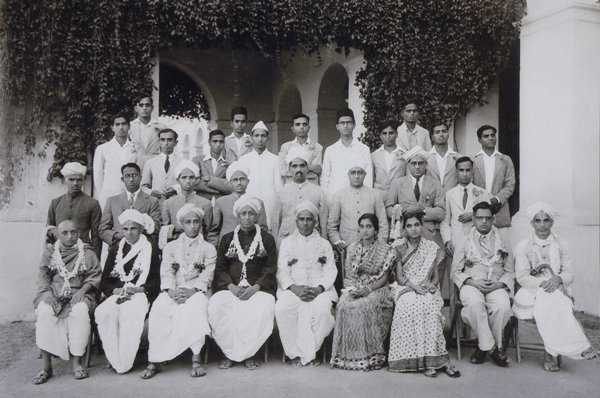
M. H. Krishna, S. Srikanta Sastri, Rallapalli Anantha Krishna Sharma

Upon his return to India, Krishna assumed charge in the history department of Maharaja College, Mysore. This was in addition to his duties at the Archaeology Department. During this time, he was president of the "University Historical Association". Krishna emphasized on the study of Karnataka history and cultural history of Karnataka. He became head of the department in 1932. In 1933, he became a member of the University Senate Academic Council. He was made dean of the faculty of arts at University of Mysore in 1939. Krishna was examiner at University of Mysore, University of Allahabad and University of Bombay in addition to being a visiting interviewer for the Civil Services Exam.

His students include S. Srikanta Sastri, Jayachamarajendra Wodeyar, Dinakara Desai, M. Seshadri, N. Anantharangachar, M. N. Srinivas, S. R. Rao, B. Sheikh Ali, A. V. Venkatarathnam, C. M. Vedavalli, M. P. L. Sastry, E. R. Sethuram, D. Javaregowda, G. Venkatasubbiah, S. V. Parameshwara Bhatta and Chaduranga.

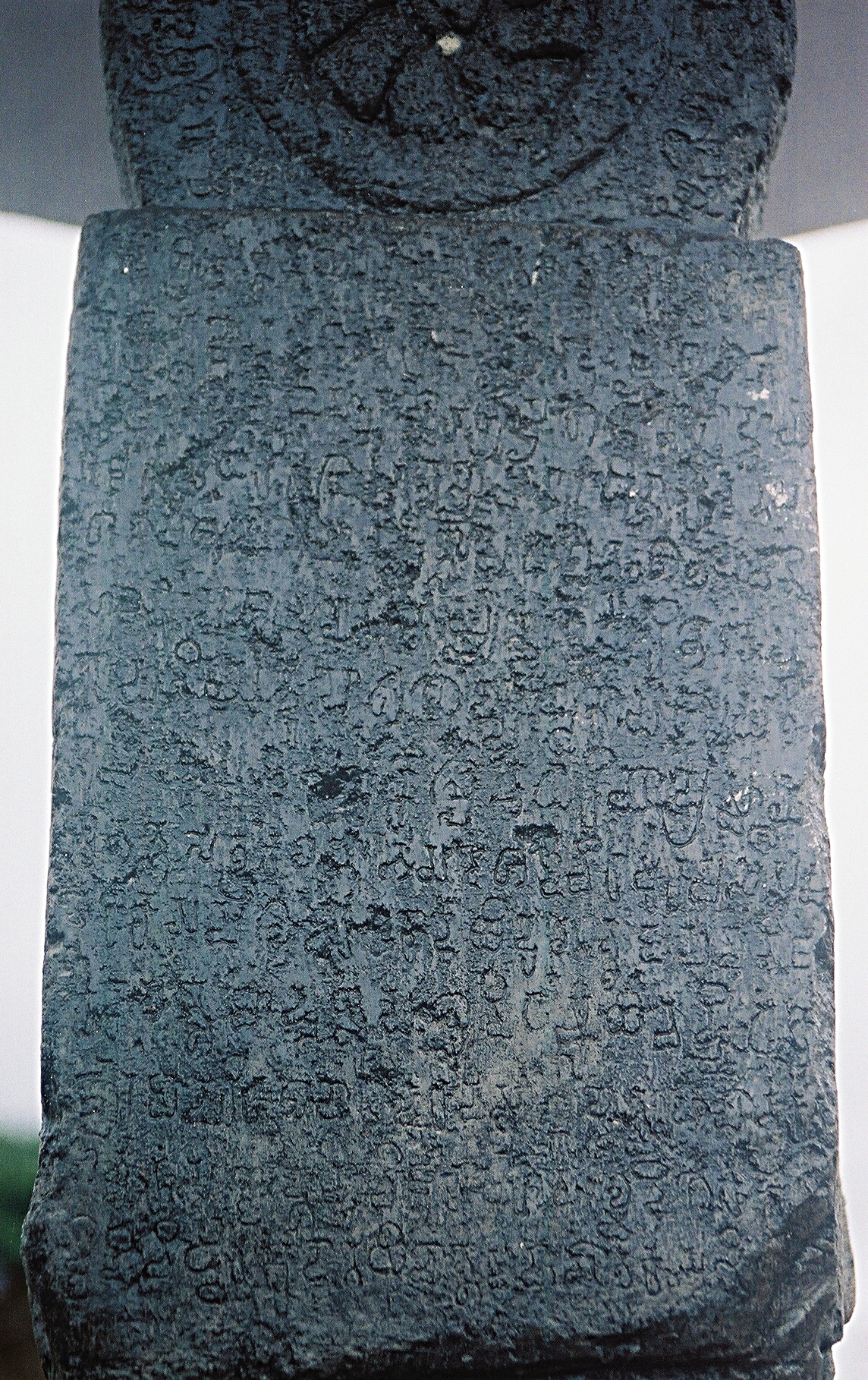
Halmidi Inscription (A. D. 350) - Discovered by Krishna

The Mysore Government Archaeological Department, since its inception in 1885, was instrumental in discoveries of hundreds of inscriptions and copper plates. Benjamin Lewis Rice was the first director and was responsible for discovering and cataloguing close to 9000 Inscriptions. His successor R. Narasimhacharya discovered about 5000 inscriptions and thereafter R. Shamasastry brought in 1000 inscriptions. M. H. Krishna added to this collection by discovering another 2000 inscriptions. Some of the inscriptions discovered by M. H. Krishna are:

- Mayura Verma's Chandravalli Inscription.
- Rashtrakuta – Pandurangapalli’ Inscription.
- Gangarasa II Madhavana Keregelur Shashana
- Vijayanagara Narasimha Copper Plates
- Kadamba Ravivarma Koramangala Plates
- Oldest Kannada Inscription – Halmidi (A. D. 450)
- Nandana Hosuru Copper Inscriptions.

Krishna was involved in discovering, what was then the oldest Kannada Inscription - Halmidi Inscription (A. D. 350). He also undertook excavations at Chandravalli in Chitradurga district. He discovered the remains of the lost city of Isila near Brahmagiri. In fact, Krishna was the first in India to use the science of 'Stratigraphy' for archaeology. He identified five different cultural strata called ‘Microlithic’, Neolithic, Iron Age, Mauryan and Chalukya-Hoysala strata. He designated the first one (the Microlithic) as the ‘Roppa Culture’ because it was found in the vicinity of that village. He also discovered the forgotten burial site of Shahaji Rao (Shivaji's Father).

== Personal life ==
Krishna married Rajamma in early 1924. She died during childbirth. Krishna married Jayamma in 1933 and had five children. He was a devotee of the Ramakrishna Mission. He was among the few, apart from the Irish poet James Cousins to suggest to K. V. Puttappa that he should author poems, not in English as he had initially attempted, but instead to do so in his native tongue - Kannada. Krishna suffered from elevated blood pressure and diabetes for nearly a decade and a half. He died on 23 December 1947.

== Contributions ==
Krishna's tenure at the Archaeological Department saw him file numerous Annual Reports, chronicle annual excavation findings in the Epigraphia Carnatica and publish his findings in many books. He authored about 15 books, 100 articles in various journals and many monographs.

=== Works ===
- Krishna, M. H.: Hindu Charithrasara
- Krishna, M. H.: Ajanta Mathu Ellora
- Krishna, M. H.: Kannada Nadina Charithre – Kalegalu
- Krishna, M. H.: Karnatakada Poorva Charithre’
- Krishna, M. H.: Tippu Sultan (Drama – Unpublished)
- Krishna, M. H.: Guide to Mysore State
- Krishna, M. H.: Great Personages in History
- Krishna, M. H.: Guide to Belur
- Krishna, M. H.: Guide to Halebidu
- Krishna, M. H.: Guide to Talkad
- Krishna, M. H.: Guide to Shravanabelagola
- Krishna, M. H.: Guide to Srirangapatna
- Krishna, M. H.: Guide to Nandi
- Krishna, M. H.: Evolution of Kannada Alphabet – A Chart
- Krishna, M. H.: Map of Karnataka
- Krishna, M. H.: Excavation at Chandravalli – Part I
- Krishna, M. H.: Proceedings of the Eighth All India Oriental Conference
- Krishna, M. H.: Index to Annual Reports of Mysore Archaeological Survey 1906 – 1908
- Krishna, M. H.: General Index to Epigraphia Carnatica Part I
- Krishna, M. H.: Epigraphia Carnatica – Vol XIV – Supplementary Inscriptions in Mysore and Mandya districts
- Krishna, M. H.: Epigraphia Carnatica – Vol XV – Supplementary Inscriptions in Hassan District
- Krishna, M. H.: Mysore Archaeological Survey Annual Reports (1929 – 1945)
- Krishna, M. H.: Hoysala Architecture (Unpublished)
- Krishna, M. H.: Excavation at Chandravalli – Part III Conclusions (Unpublished)
- Krishna, M. H.: Political & Cultural History of India (Unpublished)
- Krishna, M. H.: Cultural History of India (Unpublished)
- Krishna, M. H.: Sindhu Teerada Puratana Samskruthi
- Krishna, M. H.: Mallikarjuna mata mathu Kala
- Krishna, M. H.: Vichaara
- Krishna, M. H.: Athyantha Prachina Kannada Shashana
