= S. Srikanta Sastri =

Indian historian, Indologist, and polyglot (1904–1974)

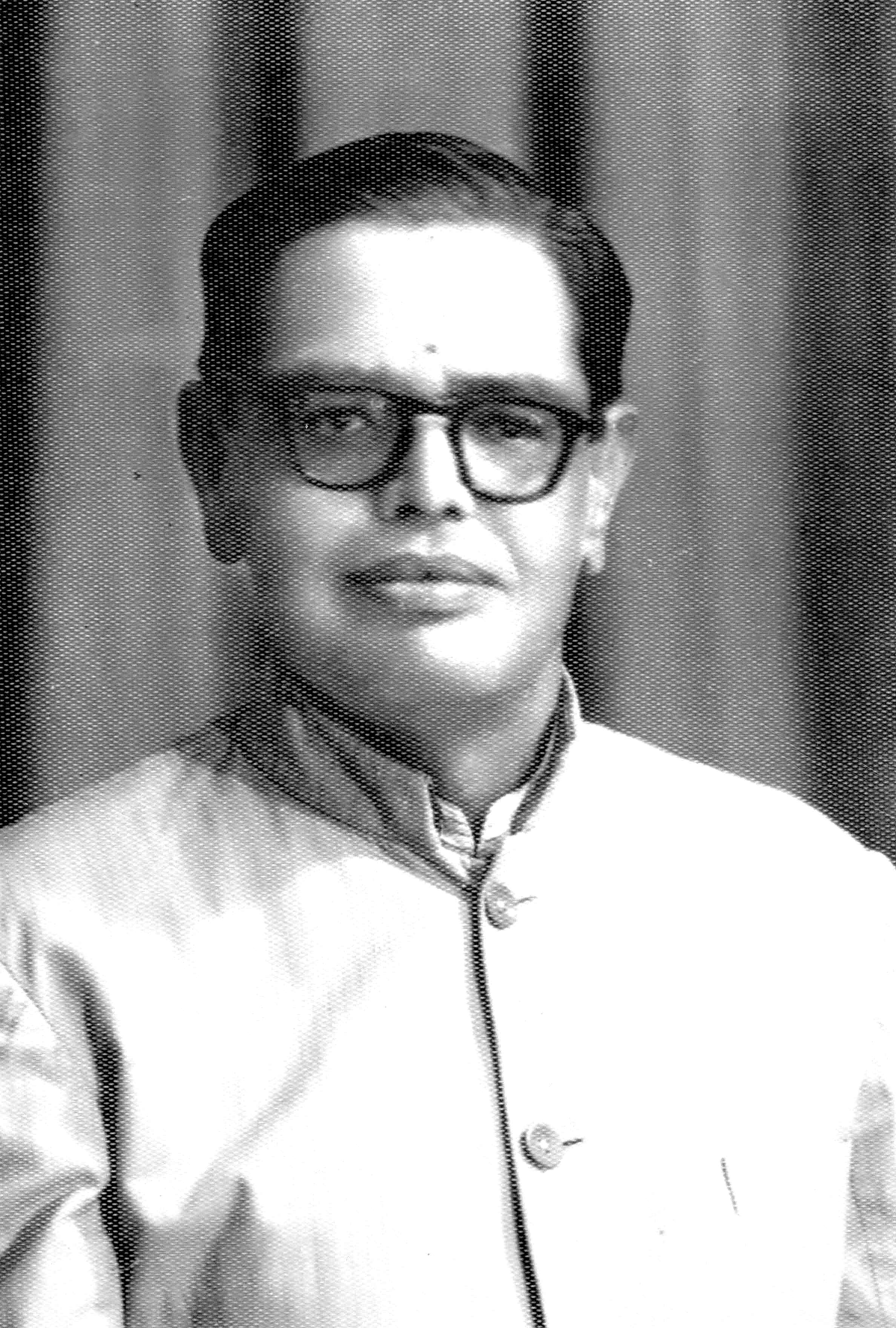
- Born: 5 November 1904; Nanjanagud, Kingdom of Mysore, British India
- Died: 10 May 1974 (aged 69); Bangalore, Karnataka, India
- Known for: Sources of Karnataka History Bharathiya Samskruti, Hoysala Vastushilpa, Proto Indic Religion
- Spouse: Nagarathnamma
- Awards: Kannada Sahitya Parishat Award (1970), Mythic Society Diamond Jubilee Honour, Festschrift Volume - "Srikanthika"

Academic background
- Education: Maharaja College, Mysore
- Academic advisors: B.M. Srikantaiah, S. V. Venkateswara, R. Shamasastry, M. H. Krishna

Academic work
- Discipline: History, Indology, Indus Valley civilization, History of Karnataka
- Institutions: University of Mysore
- Notable students: G. Venkatasubbiah, M. Chidananda Murthy, U. R. Ananthamurthy, R. K. Laxman, R. K. Narayan, S. Bangarappa, Poornachandra Tejaswi, A. K. Ramanujan, T. R. S. Sharma, Chaduranga, Jayachamarajendra Wadiyar, Y. G. Krishnamurti
- Website: srikanta-sastri.org

Sondekoppa Srikanta Sastri (5 November 1904 – 10 May 1974) was an Indian historian, Indologist, and polyglot. He authored around 12 books, over two hundred articles, several monographs and book reviews over four decades in English, Kannada, Telugu and Sanskrit. These include "Sources of Karnataka History", "Geopolitics of India & Greater India", "Bharatiya Samskruthi" (a compendium on Indian culture and tradition) and "Hoysala Vastushilpa" (a study of temple architecture of the Hoysala period in Karnataka). S. Srikanta Sastri was a polyglot well versed in fourteen languages spanning Greek, Latin, Pali, Prakrit, Sanskrit and German among others. He was Head of the Department of History & Indology at Maharaja College, University of Mysore between 1940 and 1960. He was conferred the Kannada Literary Academy award in 1970 and was subsequently honoured by Governor of Karnataka Mohanlal Sukhadia in 1973 during mythic society diamond jubilee function. A Festschrift was brought forth and presented to him during his felicitation function in 1973 titled "Srikanthika" with articles on History and Indology by distinguished scholars. His work on Indus Valley civilization and town planning at Harappa and Mohenjodaro were published in successive articles and drew considerable attention. His articles on The Aryan Invasion theory, the date of Adi Sankaracharya, Oswald Spengler's view on Indian culture, Jaina epistemology, Proto-Vedic religion of Indus Valley Civilization and evolution of the Gandabherunda insignia remain relevant today.

== Ancestry ==
S. Srikanta Sastri was born into the a Mulukanadu Brahmin family and a scholarly lineage. A paternal ancestor - Yagnapathi Bhatta was a famous court poet in the court of Kempegowda. His maternal ancestor Umamahesvara Sastri, a renowned court poet in the Vijayanagara Kingdom had earned the title of "Abhinava Kalidasa" for his work "Bhagavata Champu". His uncles - Vidwan Motaganahalli Mahadeva Sastri, Vidwan Shankara Sastri and Asthan Maha Vidwan Ramasesha Sastri were eminent court poets in the Mysore Palace. Vidwan Ramshesha Sastri was the first person to translate "Bhagavata" to Kannada from Sanskrit.

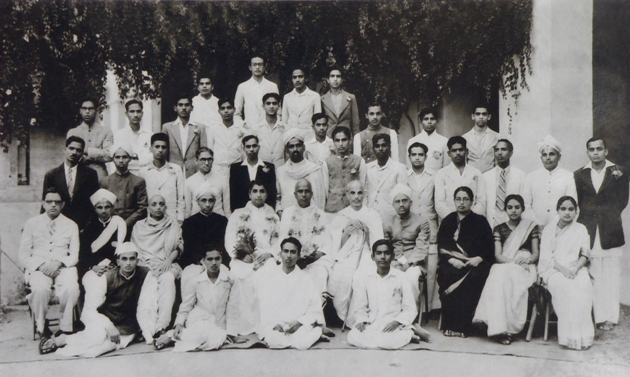
Maharaja's College Group Photo showing Kuvempu, Ta Ra Su, A. R. Krishna Sastri, Ralapalli Anatha Krishna Sharma among others

== Early life ==
He had his preliminary schooling in the cities of Kolar, Nanjanagud and Chikkaballapur before moving to Mysore. After finishing his school, he pursued his Bachelor's and subsequently master's degree in History at Maharaja's College, Mysore. Here he came under the influence of S. V. Venkateswara (History)[pictured], J. C. Rollo, B. M. Srikantaiah (English), V. L. D'Souza, H. Krishna Rao (Greek History), N. S. Subba Rao (Economics) and M. H. Krishna (Ancient History). During these years, he penned his first article titled "Conquests of Siladitya in the South" on the reign of King Harsa Siladitya in the "Journal of the Royal Asiatic Society of Great Britain & Ireland" in July, 1926. On completion of his education, S. Srikanta Sastri secured the post of a tutor at Maharaja College, University of Mysore in the Department of History (1930) and subsequently became a lecturer in the Department in 1935. Contemporaneous at this time were K. V. Puttappa (Kuvempu), A. R. Krishna Sastri, T. S. Venkannayya, Ralapalli Anantha Krishna Sharma, V. Seetharamaiah, D. L. Narasimhachar, T. S. Shamarao and N. Anantharangachar.

== Works ==
S. Srikanta Sastri authored about 12 books, 224 articles [100 in English, 114 in Kannada, 8 in Telugu, 1 in Sanskrit & Hindi] and three monographs and book reviews in Kannada, English, Telugu and Sanskrit. Among his earliest essays were "Kannada Nayananda" and "Shivaganga Kshetra" - a treatise on the religious centre of Shivaganga. He published his first article in the "Journal of the Royal Asiatic Society of Great Britain & Ireland" at the age of twenty two. He subsequently authored a small piece on King Devaraya of Vijayanagara Kingdom in the "Indian Antiquary". His earliest book "Sources of Karnataka History, Vol I" provides a list of resource material in the form of inscriptions, epigraphics and tablets enabling a detailed study of history of state of Karnataka over two millennia. His next work - "Geopolitics of India and Greater India" was on the evolving Geo-Political scene in Asia and India's role in the coming decades where he outlines a union of nations, coming together to complement each other's needs - a forerunner to the Warsaw Pact, NATO, SAARC and BRICS associations. His third book - "Early Gangas of Talakad" published in 1952 dealt with the rise and fall of Ganga Dynasty in Southern Karnataka. This received a favourable review by Emeritus Professor of Oriental Law J Duncan M Derrett in the Journal of the Royal Asiatic Society of Great Britain & Ireland in July 1953. His fourth book "Bharatiya Samskruti" (Kannada: ಭಾರತೀಯ ಸಂಸ್ಕೃತಿ) served to illuminate on cultural, traditional and historical aspects of India spanning over three millennia. S. Srikanta Sastri's study on the Nayaka rulers of Chitradurga in his research article "Capitulation of Chitradurga" (1928) describes the decline and fall of Palegars in early eighteenth century. His Collection of English writings have been brought forth as two hard bound volumes titled "ŚRÌKAŅŢHAYÁNA" in 2016. In 2021, S. Srikanta Sastri's Kannada work "Bharathiya Samskruthi" was translated into English under the title of "Indian Culture" by S. Naganath.

=== List of books ===
- Sources of Karnataka History, Vol I (1940)
- Geo-Politics of India and Greater India (1943)
- Iconography of Vidyarnava Tantra (1944)
- Proto-Indic Religion (1948)
- Roman Chakradipatya (1949)
- Early Gangas of Talakad (1952)
- Bharatiya Samskruti (1954)
- Prapancha Charithreya Rupa Rekhegalu (1957)
- Purathatva Shodhane (1960)
- Hoysala Vastushilpa (1960)
- Festschrift Volume – Srikanthika (1973)
- Samshodhana Lekhanagalu (1975)
- Srikanteshwara Shatakam (1975)

== Recognition ==
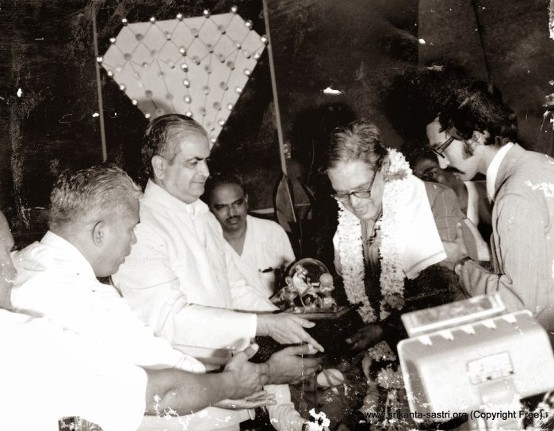
Karnataka State Governor Mohanlal Sukadia felicitation S. Srikanta Sastri with the Lifetime achievement award at Mythic Society, Bangalore

Srikanta Sastri was the second person to receive a D. Litt degree from the University of Mysore (in 1949). In 1958, S. Srikanta Sastri presided over the Kannada Literary Conference (Kannada: ಸಾಹಿತ್ಯ ಸಮ್ಮೇಳನ ಕಲಾಗೋಷ್ಠಿ) at Bellary, Karnataka. He was conferred the Kannada Literary Academy (Kannada: ಕನ್ನಡ ಸಾಹಿತ್ಯ ಸಮ್ಮೇಳನ) award in 1970. During the Diamond Jubilee Celebrations of Mythic Society, Karnataka Governor Mohanlal Sukhadia (pictured) honoured S. Srikanta Sastri for Lifetime Contribution to Historical Research & Studies. The University of Mysore brought forth a Festschrift Volume titled "Srikanthika" (Kannada: ಶ್ರೀಕಂಠಿಕ) with articles on History and Indology by distinguished scholars. In 1994, S. Srikanta Sastri's portrait was unveiled in The Daly Hall of Fame at Mythic Society, Bangalore during The South Indian Numismatics Conference - 1994. In 2004, to mark his birth centenary, a two-day National Seminar was conducted, where several papers were presented in honour of S. Srikanta Sastri. The Mythic Society, Bangalore has published "Centenary Commemoration Volume" containing these papers presented during this occasion. The Government of Karnataka as part of celebrations marking fifty years of statehood brought forth a reprint of "Bharatiya Samskruti" in 2008. The Mythic Society under the Editorship of T. V. Venkatachala Sastry and P. N. Narasimha Murthy brought forth a collection of S. Srikanta Sastri's works in English titled "Śrıkaņțayána" in 2016.

== Legacy ==
S. Srikanta Sastri taught history for more than three decades (1926 - 1960) at Maharaja College, Mysore. He delivered over twenty lectures on the state radio at Mysore, Bangalore and Dharwad radio stations of Akashavani. He reviewed books in popular newspapers of his time. He penned numerous Forewords and Introductions to various books. As a founding Professor of Department of Indology at University of Mysore, he was instrumental in developing the course material. His students include G. Venkatasubbaiah, U. R. Ananthamurthy, M. Chidananda Murthy, T. V. Venkatachala Sastry, S. R. Rao, R. K. Narayan, R. K. Laxman, H. Y. Sharada Prasad and Y. G. Krishnamurti. He died on 10, May 1974 at the age of sixty nine in Bangalore.

== Bibliography ==
- Krishnamurti, Y. G. (1939). Indian States and the Federal Plan (1st ed.) Bombay: Seth Ratansey Jetha. pp;XVIII
- Krishnamurti, Y. G. (1942). Jawaharlal Nehru: The Man and His Ideas (1st ed.) Bombay: The Popular Book Depot. pp;XXXVI
- Krishnamurti, Y. G. (1943). Independent India and a New World Order (1st ed.) Bombay: The Popular Book Depot. pp;XVIII
- Krishnamurti, Y. G. (1943). Gandhi Era in World Politics (1st ed.) Madras: New Jack Press - D. K. Parker, C. N. Paramesvaran. pp.;VIII
- Krishnamurti, Y. G. (1944). The Betrayal of Freedom (2nd ed.) Bombay: The Popular Book Depot. pp;VI (Author's Note)
- Krishnamurti, Y. G. (1945). Back to Sanity (1st ed.) Mysore: M. P. Basrur. pp.;XIV
- Krishnamurti, Y. G. (1947). Freedom in an age of revolution (1st ed.) Madras: C. M. Manavalan, Literary Agent. pp.;123
- Krishnamurti, Y. G. (1949). Gandhism will survive (1st ed.) Patna: Acharya Ramlochan Saran. pp;52
- Felicitation Committee (1973). श्रीकंटिक (SRIKANTHIKA) - Festschrift Volume Mysore pp. 405 - 465
- Subba Rao, T. R. (Ta. Ru. Su.) (1960). ಶಿಲ್ಪಶ್ರೀ [Śilpaśrī] - A Historical Novel (6th ed.) Bangalore: Hemantha Sahitya pp.;VII. OCLC 19746941
- Possehl, Gregory. L (1979). Ancient Cities of The Indus (1st ed.). New Delhi: Vikas Publishing House. pp. 411. ISBN 0706907817.
- Krishnamurthy, S. R. (1980). ಎಸ್. ಶ್ರೀಕಂಠ ಶಾಸ್ತ್ರೀ (1st ed.). Bangalore: S. R. Krishnamurthy. pp. 24–30.
- Shivanna, K. S. (1988). A Critique of Hoysala Polity (1st ed.). Mysore: S. Prakash. p. 134
- Govinda Pai, H. Krsna Bhatt, M. Upadhya Hiriyadaka (1995). ಗೋವಿಂದ ಪೈ ಸಂಶೋಧನ ಸಂಪುಟ (1st ed.). Udupi: Rāṣṭrakavi Gōvinda Pai Saṃśōdhana Kēndra. pp. 291 - 295
- Venkatachala Sastry, T. V. (1985). ಸಾಹಿತ್ಯ ಶಿಲ್ಪಿಗಳು (1st ed.). Bangalore: Kalāsāhitya Prakāśana. pp. 36 - 40
- Venkatachala Sastry. T. V., Leela Subramanyam. C. R. (1972). A Bibliography of Karnataka Studies (1st ed.). Mysore: Prasārānga - University of Mysore. pp. 79
- Venkatachala Sastry, T. V. (2008). ಮುಲುಕನಾಡು ಬ್ರಾಹ್ಮಣರು (2nd ed.). Bangalore: Mulukanadu Mahasangha. pp. 438–440.
- Mulukanadau Mahasabha (2000). ಮುಲುಕನಾಡು ಮಹನೀಯರು (1st ed.). Mysore: Maisūru Mulakanāḍu Sabhā. pp. 213
- Ramaswamy, S. R. (1972). ಮಹಾಭಾರತದ ಬೆಳವನಿಗೆ (1st ed.). Mysore: Kāvyālaya Prakāśakaru. pp. 346 - 348
- Ramaswamy, S. R. (2009). ದೀವಿಟಿಗೆಗಳು (2nd ed.). Bangalore: Rashrothana Mudranalaya. pp. 111 – 126. ISBN 8186595023.
- Ramaswamy, S. R. (2011). ದೀಪ್ತಿಮಂತರು: ವ್ಯಕ್ತಿಚಿತ್ರಗಳು (2nd ed.). Bangalore: Rashrothana Mudranalaya. pp.;124 - 136. ISBN 8186595503.
- Nagaraj Rao, H. M. (2013). ಚಿತ್ರ - ಚೌಕಟ್ಟು (ವ್ಯಕ್ತಿಚಿತ್ರ ಮಾಲೆ) (1st ed.). Mysore: Tara Prints. pp. 54–62.
- Rahman, M. M. (2005). Encyclopedia of Historiography (1st ed.). New Delhi: Anmol Publications. pp. 78. ISBN 8126123052
- Adiga, Malini (2006). The Making of Southern Karnataka: Society, Polity and Culture in the Early Medieval Period (1st ed.). Chennai: Orient Longman. pp. 43. ISBN 978-8125029120
- Nāgarājayya, Hampa (2014). Rāṣṭrakūṭas: revisited (1st ed.). Bangalore: K.S. Muddappa Smaraka Trust Krishnapuradoddi. pp. 417 ISBN 9788190818353
- Sampatkumārācārya, V. S. (2006). Life in the Hoysala age, 1000-1340 A.D. (1st ed.). Mysore: Bharateeya Ithihasa Samkalana Samiti. pp. 467
- Manjunath, C. U. (2012). ಶಾಷನಗಳು ಮತ್ತು ಕರ್ನಾಟಕ ಸಂಸ್ಕೃತಿ (1st ed.). Kuppam: Chitrakala Prakashana. pp. 280
- Swami Harshananda. (2008) A Concise Encyclopaedia of Hinduism (1st ed.). Bangalore : Ramakrishna Math pp. 76 ISBN 9788179070574
- Harold G Coward, K Kunjunni Raja (1990). The Philosophy of the Grammarians (1st ed.). Princeton, New Jersey: Princeton University Press. ISBN 9788120804265
- Heinrich von Stietencron, P Flamm. (1992). Epic and Purāṇic bibliography (1st ed.). Wiesbaden: O. Harrassowitz ISBN 3447030283
- Iyengar, H. S. Krishnaswamy (1998). Belaku cellida baduku : 'Sudhā' vārapatrikeyalli prakaṭavāda vyakti citragaḷa sankalana". Publisher: Maisūru : Taḷukina Veṅkaṇṇayya Smāraka Granthamāle.
- Hegde, Nagpathi. K. S. (2020)."ಭಾರತೀಯ ಸಂಸ್ಕೃತಿ ಮತ್ತು ಪರಂಪರೆ - ಒಂದು ಕಿರುಪರಿಚಯ" (1st ed.) Bangalore. pp. 256
- Sundareshan (1963). "ತಲೆಕಟ್ಟು". Publisher: Tandava Moorthy Press - C. Nataraj. pp. III - V
- Lakshminarasimha Sastry, Hurugalavadi (2021). "ಶೃಂಗೇರಿ ರತ್ನಸಂಪುಟ - ೩" (Sringeri Ratnasamputa). Publisher: Bharathi Prakashana (1st ed). Mysore. pp. 402 - 403.
