= M. H. Marigowda =

Indian horticulturist

M. H.. Marigowda(Maragowdanahalli Hombegowda marigowda) is also known as Father of Horticulture in Karnataka.

Dr Marigowda, a horticultural expert, born in a Vokkaliga family, had dedicated his life for the development of Horticulture in Karnataka as it would help in uplifting farmers and provide healthy food for the society as a whole. He had envisaged setting up of farms and farmer outlets in every district and taluk in the State, apart from measures to offer courses in horticulture at Lalbagh, Bengaluru.

When Dr. M. H. Marigowda took charge as the "Superintendent of Horticulture" in Mysore, in 1951, the developmental works in the state started at an unprecedented pace.

8 August is celebrated as "Dr. M. H. Marigowda Foundation Day". Dr Manmohan Attavar is the President of M.H. Marigowda Horticultural Education and Research Foundation.

- In 1963, consequent to the formation of the separate Department of Horticulture, he was elevated to the post of the "Director of Horticulture". Several schemes which were earlier handled by the Agriculture Department, were transferred to this newly created Department.
- In 1965, the reorganization of the Department took place and several posts were created in order to carry over the task of Horticulture development in the state. Also, a large number of new schemes were sanctioned.
- In 1966, as a result of reorganization of the state, the Horticultural activities were extended to all the 19 districts.

Thus, he was responsible for elevating the minor Department of Horticulture to a major Department.

- During his term, he took the Horticulture to the rural areas and to the common man.
- He set into implementation of a unique pattern of Horticulture development i.e., "4-Limbed Model of Horticulture". To suit this, he
  - established the Horticulture Produce Co-operative Marketing Society [HOPCOMS] and the Nurserymen’s Co-operative Society at Bangalore.
  - started as many as 357 farms and nurseries all over the state.
  - His visualization of the farms and nurseries was in developing them as progeny orchards, nursery centers and places of demonstration of new crops and technology to the farmers.
  - Seed testing, soil testing and plant protection laboratories were started at Lalbagh by him. Several parks and gardens were laid out in different cities and towns of the state. The area of Lalbagh Botanical Garden was expanded to 240 acres (0.97 km^{2}) and planted with additional native and exotic species of plants during his period.
  - Dr. Marigowda was a staunch advocate of "Dry Land Horticulture" and the principles and practices of these technologies were demonstrated in most of the farms started by him. This inspired the farmers of the state to practice Dry Land Horticulture on vast dry and drought prone tracts of the state.
  - Mixed cropping and intercroppings got special fillip during his times.

Thus, through multifarious achievements and feats, the state of Karnataka became the "Horticultural State of India", and Dr. Marigowda’s name became immortal in the annals of Horticulture development in Karnataka.

A succinct biographical sketch of M. H. Marigowda was well portrayed by noted Indian journalist, writer, critic and editor S. R. Ramaswamy in his book "Deeptimantaru".
