= Epigraphia Carnatica =

Epigraphia Carnatica is a set of books on epigraphy of the Old Mysore region of India, compiled by Benjamin Lewis Rice, the Director of the Mysore Archaeological Department. Over a period of about ten years between 1894 and 1905, Rice published the books in a set of twelve volumes. The books contain the study of about 9,000 inscriptions from lithic surfaces and copper plates, which were found in the region. Apart from the original inscription, an English translation and a Roman transliteration are also provided.

== History ==
Benjamin Lewis Rice was born in Bangalore in 1837. His father was a Christian missionary and head of the Bangalore parish. After completing his education in England, Rice returned to serve as the principal of Central School in Bangalore. He was also appointed as a secretary of the education commission. When he toured the countryside as an education inspector, he came across various inscriptions. He was interested in epigraphy and he took the help of his assistants to edit, translate and transliterate about 9,000 inscriptions. In 1886, when the British made him the head of the Department of Archaeology, he started work towards publishing his epigraphical study and brought out a series of twelve volumes entitled Epigraphia Carnatica. Rice also wrote a book called The History of Mysore and Coorg from Inscriptions which is based on Epigraphia Carnatica.

== Compilation ==
Epigraphia Carnatica contains a study of inscriptions from AD 3rd century until 19th century. These inscriptions belonged to different dynasties that ruled this region such as Gangas, Cholas, Kadambas, Western Chalukyas, Pandyas, Hoysalas, Vijayanagar kings, Hyder Ali and his son Tipu Sultan, and the Mysore Wodeyars. The inscriptions found were mainly written in Kannada language, but some have been found to be written in languages like Tamil, Sanskrit, Telugu, Urdu, and Persian.

== Publishing ==
After the set of twelve volumes had been published by Rice, R. Narasimhachar, who succeeded Rice as the head of the archaeological department, found around another 4,000 inscriptions. M.H. Krishna, after his excavations at Chandravalli and Brahmagiri, discovered 2,000 inscriptions and published these discoveries as volumes 13, 14 and 15 of Epigraphia Carnatica.

By 1950 the volumes were out of print, and so in 1972 the Department of Kannada at Mysore University undertook the task of reprinting the volumes, but could only bring out six volumes in 33 years. The methodology employed has been criticized as the inscriptions were re-numbered by the editors of the Mysore University volumes, making it difficult for readers to locate the inscription. The Southern Regional Centre of the Indian Council of Historical Research (ICHR) under the chairmanship of Professor S. Settar wanted to create a digitized version of the volumes. Settar donated his personal copies of Epigraphia Carnatica, which were scanned and released as a CD-ROM in 2005.

== Volumes ==
In the preface of each volume is found a description about the publication and its contents, persons involved, and/or struggles, some of which owing to a change of staff, a post-war retrenchment, etc.

From 1886 to 1905 [19 years], B. Lewis Rice published the first twelve volumes in multiple parts as fourteen books, followed by a revision of Vol. I in 1914 with 75 additional inscriptions, bringing to light nearly 5,000 inscriptions of the 8,869 he collected over the course of 22 years.

In 1923, R. Narasimhachar published a revised and enlarged edition of Rice's Vol. II, which contains 356 new inscriptions (500 total) with translations ranging from AD 600 to 1889.

Rice's intention was to publish Vol. XIII as an index to his publications, so in 1934, Dr. M. H. Krishna, with the help of K. Rama Rao, M. C. Srinivasa Iyengar, and R. Narasimhachar, published part one of Vol. XIII: General Index, covering letters 'A' to 'K' of Rice's 1st editions.

In 1943, Dr. M. H. Krishna published a Vol. XIV supplement for Rice's Vol. V, which contains texts and translations of about 750 inscriptions, new and revised, collected between 1906 and 1914 in the old Mysore District which included the present Mandya District.

In 1955, Prof. K. A. Nilakanta Sastri published a Vol. XVI supplement for Rice's Vol. XII, which contains new inscriptions collected by Mr. R. Narasimhachar between 1906 and 1922 in the Tumkur District and has transliteration of about 270 inscriptions.

In 1965, Dr. M. Seshadri published a Vol. XVII supplement for Rice's Vol. X. In 1970, he also published a Vol. XVIII supplement, which revised and added a few new additions to Rice's Vol. VII and Vol. VIII.

In 1972, a 3rd revised edition to Rice's Vol. I, 2nd ed. was published, which contains 32 new inscriptions.

In 1987, R. Narasimhachar published the second part of Vol. XIII: General Index, covering letters 'L' to 'Z' of the first twelve volumes.

Volumes 1 to 12:

- Vol. I: Coorg Inscriptions. (Rice, 1886). (Rice, 1914, 2nd ed.). (1972, 3rd ed.).
- Vol. II: Inscriptions at Sravana Belgola. (Rice, 1889). (Narasimhachar, 1923, 2nd ed.).
- Vol. III: Inscriptions in the Mysore District, Part I. (Rice, 1894).
- Vol. IV: Inscriptions in the Mysore District, Part II. (Rice, 1898).
- Vol. V: Inscriptions in the Hassan District, Part I. (Rice, 1902).
- Vol. V: Inscriptions in the Hassan District, Part II. (Rice, 1902).
- Vol. VI: Inscriptions in the Kadur District. (Rice, 1901).
- Vol. VII: Inscriptions in the Shimoga District, Part I. (Rice, 1902).
- Vol. VIII: Inscriptions in the Shimoga District, Part II. (Rice, 1904).
- Vol. IX: Inscriptions in the Bangalore District. (Rice, 1905).
- Vol. X: Inscriptions in the Kolar District. (Rice, 1905).
- Vol. X: Inscriptions in the Kolar District, Part II. (Rice, 1905).
- Vol. XI: Inscriptions in the Chitaldroog District. (Rice, 1903).
- Vol. XII: Inscriptions in the Tumkur District. (Rice, 1904).

Volumes 13 to 19:

- Vol. XIII: General Index, Part I [A–K for Vols. I–XII, 1st ed.]. (Krishna, 1934).
- Vol. XIII: General Index, Part II [L–Z for Vols. I–XII, 1st ed.]. (Narasimhachar, 1987).
- Vol. XIV: Supplementary Inscriptions in the Mysore and Mandya Districts. (Krishna, 1943).
- Vol. XV: Supplementary Inscriptions in the Hassan District [Vol. V]. (Krishna, 1943).
- Vol. XVI: Supplementary Inscriptions in the Tumkur District [Vol. XII]. (Sastri, 1955).
- Vol. XVII: Supplementary Inscriptions in the Kolar District [Vol. X]. (Seshadri, 1965).
- Vol. XVIII: Supplementary Inscriptions in the Shimoga District [Vols. VII and VIII]. (Seshadri, 1970).
- Vol. ?: Supplementary Inscriptions in the Bangalore District [Vol. IX]. (Planned).
