= Vidwan =

In Hindu philosophy vidvān alludes to an expert in discrimination, to the one who is an expert in the Vedanta.

A vidwan (or vidvan) is a person who has vidyā (knowledge) of a particular science or art. This term is usually used for Indian classical musicians to denote their scholarship and experience in performing classical music concerts. While vidwan is the masculine form, vidushi is used for women. Both may be shortened to vid.
