= Ramasesha Sastri =

Indian playwright, translator, writer and Sanskrit grammarian (1867–1934)

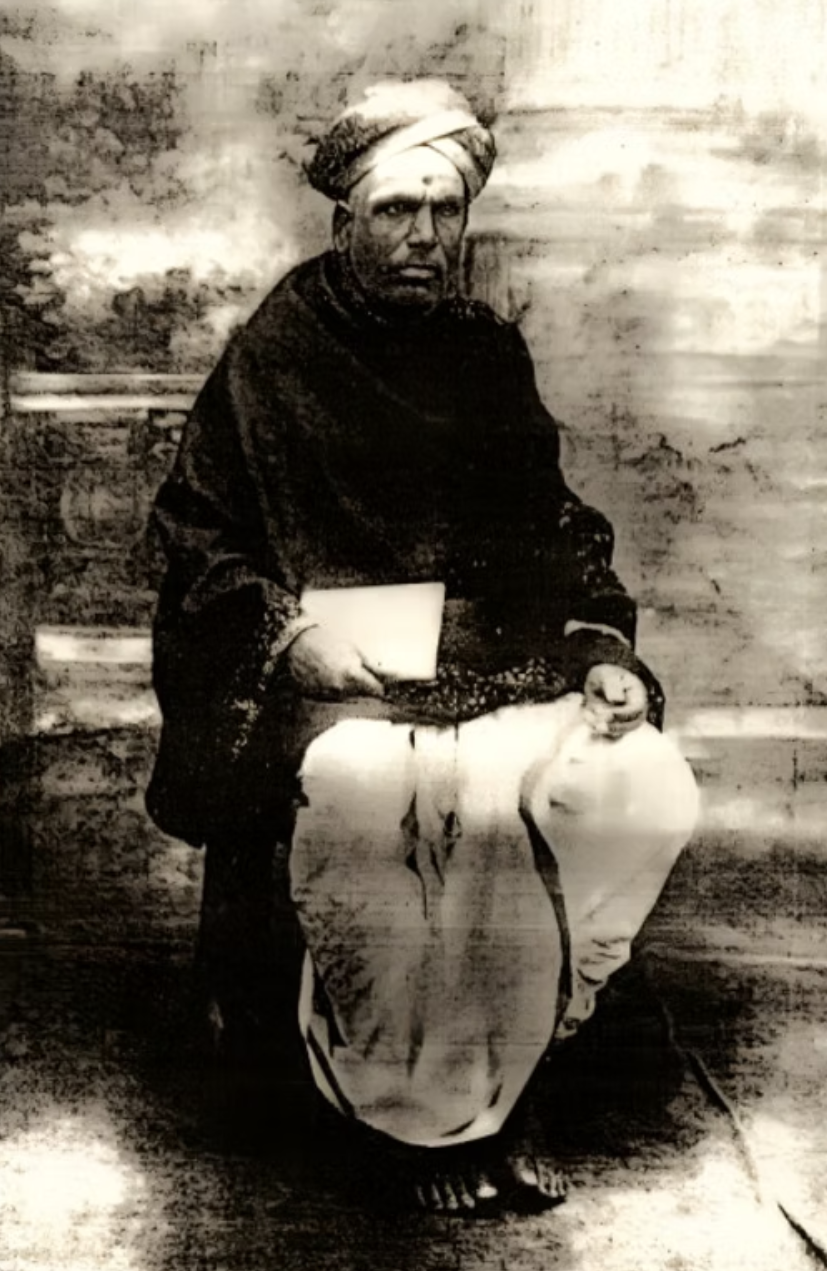
- Born: 24 September 1867; Motaganahalli, Magadi Taluk, Bangalore District, Kingdom of Mysore, British India
- Died: 19 February 1934 (aged 66); Bangalore, Karnataka, India
- Title: Asthan Maha Vidwan

Academic work
- Discipline: Chief Officiating Priest of the Mysore Palace and Sanskrit Playwright & Translator
- Sub-discipline: Bhagavata, Ramayana and Sanskrit Plays
- Institutions: Mysore Palace
- Website: srikanta-sastri.org

Ramasesha Sastri (24 September 1867 – 19 February 1934)(known by his title, Asthan Mahavidwan Motaganahalli Ramasesha Sastri) was an Indian playwright, translator, impromptu Sanskrit & Kannada poet and grammarian who authored such works as ‘Sri Bhagavata’, 'Baalikageethavali', ‘Prabhoda Chandrodaya’ and ‘Vamana Vijaya’. His Kannada translations of 'Hitopadesham’, ‘Mudrarakshasa’ (Karnataka Mudrarakshasa Natakam) and 'Bhagavata Mahapurana' remain popular among Kannada and Sanskrit scholars today. Ramasesha Sastri was the chief priest at the Mysore Palace, where he conducted prince Jayachamarajendra Wadiyar's Upanayana (sacred thread investiture) and Aksharabhyasa ceremonies. He was known to compose Sanskrit compositions extempore. Ramasesha Sastri and his brothers Shankara Sastri & Mahadeva Sastri were well known in the central Bangalore district (old city), for their popular renditions of Indian epics like The Mahabharata and the The Ramayana, often attracting large audiences. Ramasesha Sastri is a maternal relative of Indian historian, epigraphist and Indologist S. Srikanta Sastri.

== Ancestry ==
Ramasesha Sastri belongs to the Mulukanadu sect of Telugu speaking Brahmins. Ramasesha Sastri was born on September 24, 1867, in Motaganahalli village, Magadi Taluk (rural Bangalore), to parents Samba Sastri and Bhagyamma. Ramasesha Sastri's brothers Shankara Sastri and Mahadeva Sastri were in turn related to the Indian historian and polyglot S. Srikanta Sastri through maternal descent. Ramasesha Sastri is a descendant of the famous Sanskrit and Kannada poet of yore Abhinava Kalidasa, the renowned author of 'Bhagavata Champu'. Ramasesha Sastry and family were land owners near Motaganahalli, Bangalore.

== Early Years ==
Ramasesha Sastri lost his mother at a young age. His father could not provide for his education owing to poor means. Ramasesha Sastri made his way to Magadi town (near Bangalore) where he learnt various Sanskrit texts on subjects like Tarka (logic), Vyakarana (grammar) and Literary Plays from Sanskrit scholars like Pandit Chappala Visveshwara Sastri, Pandit Sondekoppa Narayana Sastri, Pandit Gangadhar Sastri, Pandit Sitaram Sastri and Pandit Vasudeva Sastri over a decade.

== Vocation ==
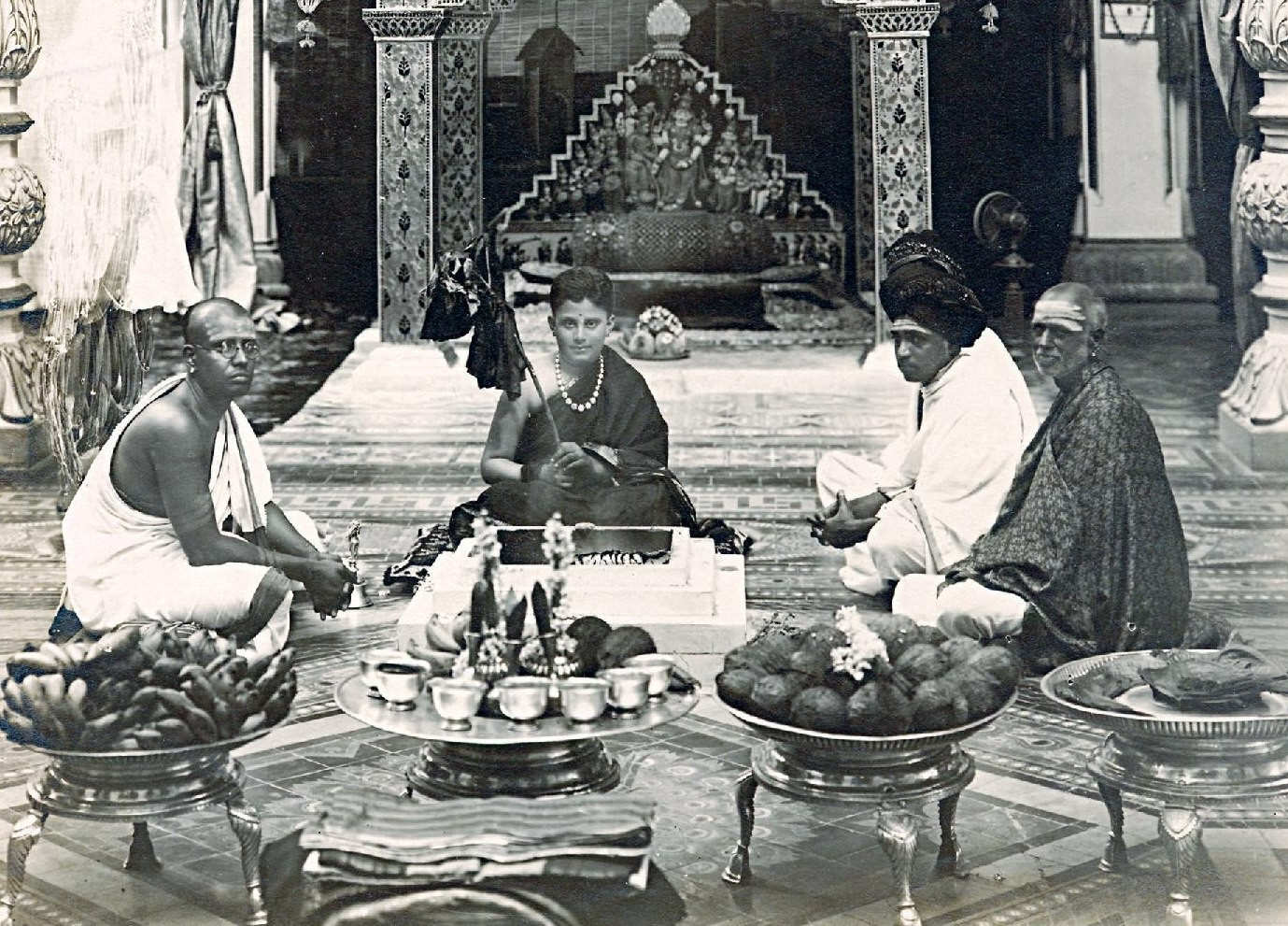
Ramasesha Sastri (sitting at the right most extreme of the photograph) conducting the sacred thread investiture ceremony (Upanayana) of Prince Jayachamarajendra Wadiyar, at the Mysore Palace.

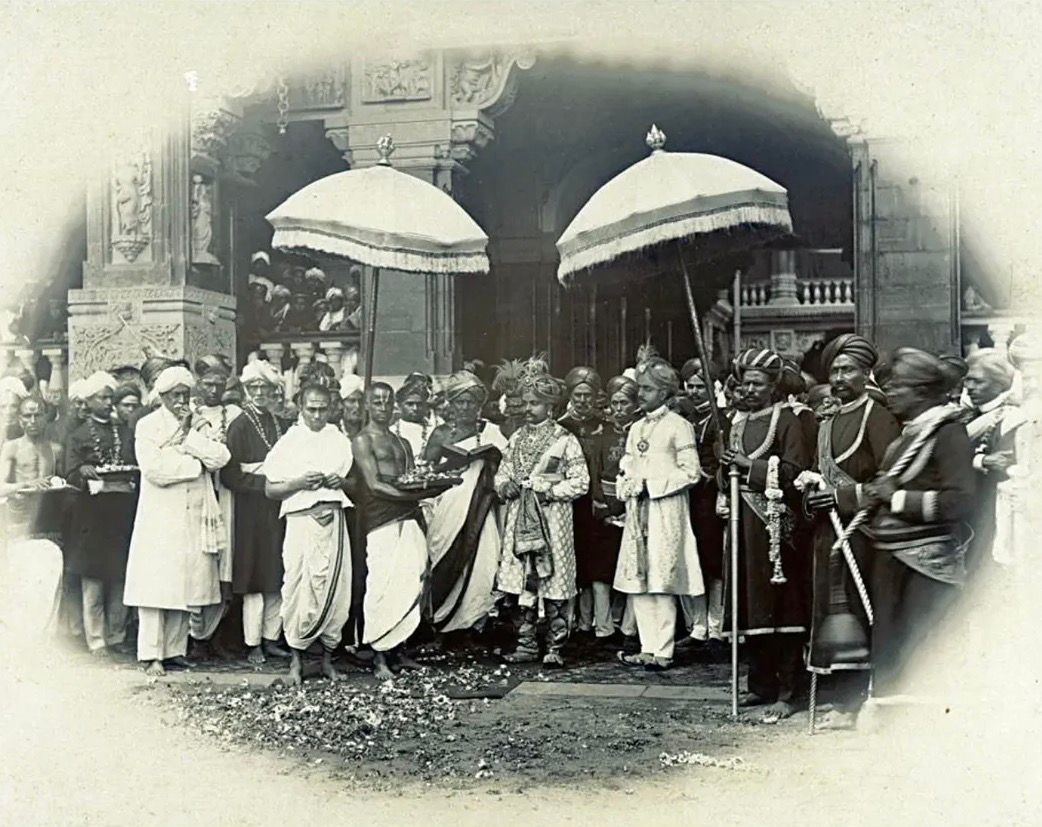
Ramasesha Sastri standing to the right of the Maharaja Nalwadi Krishna Raja Wodeyar (at the centre)

Ramasesha Sastri along with his elder brothers Mahadeva Sastri and Shankara Sastri were well versed in The Mahabharata, The Ramayana, Bhagavata Purana and other Hindu texts. They were equally proficient at composing Sanskrit and Kannada hymns and poems in metrical rhyme scheme. These were eventually published between 1920 - 1940. The brothers were known for their discourses on Hindu Epics and Puranic stories, in the New Tharagupet area, old Sringeri Math in Sultanpet and later at the Kalikamba temple in Nagarathpet, Bangalore. For a brief period, he taught at the local government school, while attending to some part time work at the Kannada Sahitya Parishat office (Bangalore). Ramasesha Sastri taught Sanskrit and Kannada languages at the United Theological College, Bangalore. After this, he taught for a while at the Normal School, Bangalore. Ramasesha Sastri worked as a Sanskrit teacher at Central College, Bangalore, before moving to Mysore. Ramasesha Sastri was appointed as a Sanskrit Vidwan at the Maharani's College, Mysore in July 1919. Here, he remained as faculty in the departments of Kannada and Sanskrit, for seven years, before retiring in September, 1926.

Kempananjammanni Devi, Queen Regent of Mysore requested Ramasesha Sastri to offer discourses and recite passages from Skanda Purana and Devi Bhagavata, on a regular basis at the Mysore Palace. Ramasesha Sastri was subsequently appointed chief priest of the Mysore Palace and routinely officiated their rituals & ceremonies, from time to time. Ramasesha Sastri, was the chief priest involved in conducting the Aksharabhyasa (Hindu initiation ceremony before receiving formal education) and Upanayana ceremonies (sacred thread investiture) of Prince Jayachamarajendra Wadiyar, at the Mysore Palace. Ramasesha Sastri also taught Sanskrit to the young Prince Jayachamarajendra Wadiyar at the Royal School, Mysore till 1927. In all, Ramasesha Sastri was associated with the Mysore Palace from 1918 till 1929, for eleven long years.

== Works ==
Among his earliest works, was a collection of Sanskrit and Kannada songs usually sung by young girls while playing, titled 'Bālikāgītāvaḷi'. He adapted the Kannada plays 'Vamana Vijaya' & 'Prabhodha Chandrodaya' to the stage. He translated the first section of the Sanskrit work 'Hitopadesham' titled 'Mitralabha' into Kannada. Similarly, Ramasesha Sastri translated Vishakadutta's 'Mudrarakshasa' from Sanskrit into Kannada. Ramasesha Sastri published a critical analysis interlaced with an authoritative commentary on 'Sri Bhagavata'. His chronological analysis of Sringeri pontiffs across the centuries, came to be published as 'Jagadguru Vijaya'. He has composed in Sanskrit and Kannada, compositions dedicated to the reigning Wadiyars of Mysore, senior pontiffs of the Sringeri temple and even the Viceroy of India. Apart from these scholarly works, Ramasesha Sastri is renowned for his nine part edition of 'Bhagavata Mahapurana', which came out initially as serialised portions, complete with translations, summaries and cross references, from 1911 till 1932.

=== Plays - Stage Adaptations ===
- Vamana Vijaya
- Prabhodha Chandrodaya

=== Translations ===
- Karnataka Mudrarakshasa Natakam
- Karnāṭaka Hitōpadēśaṃ (1895)
- Śrī Bhāgavata Mahāpurāṇa (1 - 9)
- Mudrarakshasa

=== Collections ===
- Bālikāgītāvaḷi

=== Biographies and Chronicles ===
- Jagaduru Vijaya (Chronicle of Sringeri Shankaracharyas; Sanskrit)

=== Original Works ===
- Ṭīkā Tātparya Sahita Mahimnasstōtra
- Mahimna stōtraṃ (1911)
- Dharma Gītāvaḷi (1894)
- Gitika Tarangini (1889)
- Vicharasagara (1930)
- Mukundananda Bhana

== Recognition ==
Ramasesha Sastri was conferred with the title of 'Asthan Vidwan' in June 1918, by the Mysore Palace. In 1920, Nalwadi Krishna Raja Wadiyar honoured Ramasesha Sastri with the 'Maha Vidwan' title, during the annual Navaratri celebrations. The senior pontiff at the Siddaganga Math, Tumkur invited Ramasesha Sastri to be the Chief Editor of their monthly periodical 'Shri Sharada' in 1915. Ramasesha Sastri was declared the best 'Ashukavi' in an impromptu Sanskrit poetry composition event, held at the Mysore Palace in 1924. Ramasesha Sastri was invited to the 39th session of the Indian National Congress (INC) held at Belgaum, in December 1924 - the only session to be officially chaired by Mahatma Gandhi himself. He received due honours from then Maharaja of Mysore, the Queen Regent Kempananjammanni Devi, Sri Nrusimha Bharathi Mahaswamiji, Sri Chandrashekhara Bharathi Mahaswamiji, Sri Shivaganga Swamiji, Sri Kanchi Kamakoti Swamiji and the Kudli Math Swamiji.

== Legacy ==
Maha Asthan Vidwan Motaganahalli Ramasesha Sastri passed away on 19 February 1934 at the age of 67 years.

== Bibliography ==
1. 'Essays and Speeches Vol 1' by S. R. Ramaswamy
2. 'The Monarch of Mysore - His Highness Sri Nalwadi Krishnaraja Wodeyar' - A Biography by Rajasevasktha Padmasri C. K. Venkataramaiah, Translator: S. Naganath
3. 'A Passage Through India - 19 Episodic Essays' by S. R. Ramaswamy
4. The Quarterly Journal of the Mythic Society, Volume 95 by Mythic Society (Bangalore, India) · 2004
5. 'Silhouettes of Excellence' by S. R. Ramaswamy
6. Calendar; 1920-1921 · Volume 1 By University of Mysore · 1920
7. Parishat Patrike - Obituary of Ramasesha Sastri by S. Srikanta Sastri (in Kannada) - July 1934 Issue.
8. 'Deevatigegalu' by S. R. Ramaswamy
9. 'Mulakanāḍu Brāhmaṇaru : samudāya, saṃskr̥ti' by T. V. Venkatachala Sastry
10. 'Mulakas - Origins of the Mulakanadu Sect' by S. Srikanta Sastri - Published in the Quarterly Journal of the Mythic Society (QJMS) - Vol XXI - No. 1
11. 'A Tapestry of Pen Portraits' by S. R. Ramaswamy
12. 'Dīptimantaru : vyakticitragaḷu = Deeptimantaru' by S. R. Ramaswamy
13. 'Śrīkaṇṭhayāna : collected papers of Dr. S. Śrīkaṇṭha Śāstri' - Edited by P. N. Narasimha Murthy and T. V. Venkatachala Sastry
14. 'Saṃśōdhana lēkhanagaḷu' by S. Srikanta Sastri
15. 'Sāhitya śilpigaḷu' by T. V. Venkatachala Sastry
