= P. Kodanda Rao =

Indian social and independence activist (1889-1975)

- Rao at the University of Hawaii in 1954
- Born: 25 December 1889; Vishakapatnam, British India
- Died: 23 July 1975 (aged 85); Bangalore, Karnataka, India
- Organization: Servants of India Society

Pandurangi Kodanda Rao (25 December 1889 – 23 July 1975) was an Indian social and independence activist who served as a member and secretary of the Indian socio-political organization Servants of India Society between 1922 and 1958. He was the private secretary to V. S. Srinivasa Sastri with whom he traveled as an advisor and delegate to multiple Round Table Conferences and other international conferences. Rao was also an associate of Indian freedom leader Mahatma Gandhi and assisted him in his campaigns against untouchability. Rao wrote extensively on topics including overseas Indians, emigration, immigration, and Indian politics under British rule.

== Early life ==
Rao was born in Visakhapatnam in the present day Indian state of Andhra Pradesh on 25 December 1889. He completed his Master of Arts degree from Presidency College from the University of Madras in 1915. After his graduation, he served as a botany professor at the Central College, Bangalore from 1915 to 1921. He was a Carnegie Scholar at Yale University between 1934 and 1935.

== Career ==
Rao applied for membership of the Servants of India Society, a socio-political organization founded by Gopal Krishna Gokhale, after his graduation. His application was rejected by V. S. Srinivasa Sastri, noting that he was too young. Rao then went to Central College, Bangalore, where he worked as a professor of Botany for six years before successfully applying for the society's membership in 1922. He served the society for 37 years before stepping down in 1958. During this time, he served as the secretary of the society, starting in 1930, and was also the editor of the society's magazine Servant of India. He also served as the president of the Indian Council of World Affairs where he was based out of the council's Bangalore branch.

Rao served as the private secretary to V. S. Srinivasa Sastri between 1922 and 1932. He accompanied Sastri to the Round Table Conferences in London and South Africa. He also accompanied Sastri when he was the Agent General of the Government of India to South Africa between 1927 and 1928. He was also a member of the Indian delegation to the Round Table Conferences between India and South Africa in 1926 and 1932. He was also the advisor to India's delegate to the permanent migrations committee at the International Labour Organization in Montreal in 1946. He traveled extensively studying the conditions of Indians overseas. Rao was also Sastri's biographer and wrote two books including The Right Honourable V.S. Srinivasa Sastri: A Political Biography (1963) and another titled Gokhale and Sastri (1961). His biography of Sastri won the Watumull Memorial Prize in 1966. Rao also served as a member of the academic and executive councils of Nagpur University between 1937 and 1942. Rao was a member of the post-war Indian delegation to Malaya to report on the post-war conditions of Indians in the region.

Rao was a personal friend of Indian independence leader Mahatma Gandhi and also assisted him in his campaigns against untouchability. The two often exchanged extensive letters. In one of those letters, Gandhi clarified the role of Henry David Thoreau in shaping his views on Civil resistance.

Rao wrote extensively in various journals on topics relating to Indians overseas, emigration, immigration, and Indian politics under the British Rule. Writing in The New York Times in 1935, he decried the Government of India Act 1935 as limiting and preventing the country from moving towards freedom and a dominion status. He also wrote books including East vs West: Denial of Contrast, Culture Conflicts: Cause and Cure, and Foreign friends of India's freedom. Rao's book, Foreign Friends of India's freedom, was a collection of broadcasts commissioned by the All India Radio on the 25th anniversary of India's independence. Rao was the recipient of the Sangeet Natak Akademi Award in 1963.

Rao also served on various governmental committees, including the Madhya Pradesh Prohibition Enquiry Committee (1951), set up by the Government of Madhya Pradesh. He was a dissenting voice when the report was finally submitted and wrote a separate dissenting note. He was also a member of the Deck Passenger Committee (1950) set up by the Ministry of Commerce to provide recommendations on passenger traffic services along the Indian coast.

== Personal life ==
Rao was married to Mary Louise Campbell Rao, an American, whom he met in Hawaii when he was there attending a conference on race relations. The couple met in 1936 and were married in 1937 in Poona. They lived their later years in Basavanagudi in Bangalore, in a house that was named 'Aloha'. In a dedication to his wife in his book East vs West, Rao wrote "She, of the occident, and I, of the orient deny East vs West and proclaim the Unity of Civilization". He also dedicated his book, Foreign Friends of India's Freedom, to his wife.

Rao died in Bangalore on 23 July 1975. He was aged 85.

== Published works ==
=== Books ===
- Rao, P. Kodanda (1939). East Versus West: A Denial of Contrast. G. Allen & Unwin.
- Rao, P. Kodanda (1946). Culture Conflicts Cause and Cure. Padmaja Publications.
- Rao, P. Kodanda (1963). The Right Honourable V. S. Srinivasa Sastri, P. C., C. H., LL.: D., D. LITT.; a Political Biography. Asia Publishing House.
- Rao, P. Kodanda (1969). Language Issue in the Indian Constituent Assembly: 1946-1950: Rational Support for English and Non-rational Support for Hindi. Distributors: International Book House.
- Rao, P. Kodanda (1973). Foreign friends of India's freedom. Bangalore: P. T. I. Book Co.

=== Journals ===
- Rao, Kodanda (1936). "India and England". The Annals of the American Academy of Political and Social Science. 186: 73–80. doi:10.1177/000271623618600113. ISSN 0002-7162. JSTOR 1020610. S2CID 145759416.
- Rao, P. Kodanda (1944). "Indians Overseas". The Annals of the American Academy of Political and Social Science. 233: 200–207. doi:10.1177/000271624423300129. ISSN 0002-7162. JSTOR 1025841. S2CID 220837664.
- Rao, P. Kodanda (1952). "Review of U.S.A.: The Permanent Revolution". India Quarterly. 8 (1): 81–85. ISSN 0974-9284. JSTOR 45067794.
- Rao, P. Kodanda (1953). "India: The Republican Dominion". Current History. 25 (148): 331–338. doi:10.1525/curh.1953.25.148.331. ISSN 0011-3530. JSTOR 45308565. S2CID 248852092.
- Rao, P. Kodanda (1954). "Communism as India sees it". Current History. 27 (159): 307–309. doi:10.1525/curh.1954.27.159.307. ISSN 0011-3530. JSTOR 45308737. S2CID 249080566.
- Rao, P. Kodanda (1959). "The Kashmir Dispute". online.ucpress.edu.
- Rao, P. Kodanda (1953). "Indian Interest in Africa". online.ucpress.edu.
