= Radha Kumud Mukherjee =

Indian historian (1884–1963)

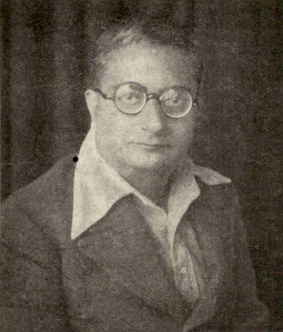
- Mukherjee in 1936

Member of Parliament, Rajya Sabha (Nominated)
- In office 3 April 1952 – 2 April 1958

Personal details
- Born: 25 January 1884 Calcutta, Bengal Presidency, India
- Died: 9 September 1963 (aged 79) Calcutta, West Bengal, India
- Occupation: Historian

Radha Kumud Mukherjee (also spelled Radhakumud Mookerji; 25 January 1884 – 9 September 1963), also known as Radha Kumud Mukhopadhyaya, was an Indian historian and a noted Indian nationalist during the period of British colonial rule. He was the brother of the sociologist Radhakamal Mukerjee.

== Career ==
Mukherjee obtained a doctorate from the University of Calcutta in 1905 and joined the newly established National Council of Education, teaching at the Bengal National College. After 1915, he embarked on a series of tenures at universities in Banaras, Mysore, and Lucknow.

He published Indian Shipping: A History of Seaborne Trade and Maritime Activity of the Indians from the Earliest Times in 1912. He was an advocate of the notion of Greater India in which Indian merchants and adventurers with huge fleets brought Indians to Southeast Asia and became the foundation of kingdoms in that region.

He was awarded the Padma Bhushan in 1957 for his contribution to Public Affairs.

== Bibliography ==
Books by Radha Kumud Mukherjee:

- Indian Shipping: A History of Seaborne Trade and Maritime Activity of the Indians from the Earliest Times
- Ancient Indian Education: Brahmanical and Buddhist (1947), reprinted by Motilal Banarsidass (1960).
- Men and Thought in Ancient India (1912) MacMillan and co., reprinted by Motilal Banarsidass (1996).
- The Fundamental Unity of India
- Hindu civilization
- Chandragupta Maurya and His Times
- Early History of Kausambi
- Local Government in Ancient India
- Nationalism in Hindu Culture
- Harsha
