= M. Chidananda Murthy =

Indian historian (1931–2020)

- Born: 10 May 1931; Doddamallapura, Hirekogalur, Channagiri taluk, Shimoga District, Karnataka, India
- Died: 11 January 2020 (aged 88); Bengaluru, Karnataka, India
- Occupations: Professor, writer, historian
- Writing career
- Genre: Non Fiction

M. Chidananda Murthy (10 May 1931 – 11 January 2020) was a Kannada writer, researcher and historian. He was a well-known scholar in Karnataka specializing in the history of Kannada language and ancient Karnataka. He was also known for his campaign to conserve the monuments Hampi and to secure classical language status to Kannada Language. Murthy also articulated that uniform civil code and an anti-conversion law must be enacted by the Government in India.

== Education ==
Chidananda Murthy obtained his Bachelor of Arts (Honours) degree in 1953 from Mysore University. He obtained his Master of Arts degree in Kannada Literature in 1957, also from Mysore University. During his postgraduate studies, he produced his influential essay Pampa Kavi Mattu Maulya Prasara.

In Mysore University, he came under the influence of Kannada literary figures like Kuvempu, PuTeeNa, Raghavachar and historians like S. Srikanta Sastri. Another literary stalwart TeeNamShri guided Murthy in doctoral research on Kannada inscriptions. His doctoral thesis was titled A cultural study of Kannada inscriptions. He obtained his PhD degree from Bangalore University in 1964.

== Career ==
Murthy was the head of the department of Kannada Bangalore University. He was also associated with Kannada Shakti Kendra. As a historian most of Murthy's work focused on scientific study of the Kannada Inscriptions.

He attempted to contextualize inscriptions in their socio cultural setup. He produced many books on the history of Kannada language and Karnataka. He guided many research students.

== Works ==
- Vīraśaiva dharma, Bhāratīya saṃskr̥ti Prakāśana, 2000
- Vāgartha Bāpkō, 1981
- Vacana sāhitya 1975
- Sweetness and light Sahithigala Kalavidara Balaga, 1989 [microform]
- Saṃśōdhane. 1967
- Saṃśōdhana taraṄga. Sarasa Sāhitya Prakāśana, 1966
- Pūrṇa sūryagrahaṇa Aibiec Prakāśana, 1982
- Pāṇḍitya rasa, Kannaḍa Viśvavidyālaya, 2000
- Śūnya sampādaneyannu kuritu. 1962
- Madhyakālīna Kannaḍa sāhitya mattu aspr̥śyate Prasārāṅga, Karnāṭaka Viśvavidyālaya, 1985
- Liṅgāyata adhyayangaḷu Vāgdēvi Pustakagaḷu, 1986
- Kavirājamārga. 1973
- Karnāṭaka saṃskr̥ti Kannaḍa Sāhitya Pariṣattu, 1991
- Karnāṭaka-Nēpāḷa Prasārāṅga, Kannaḍa Viśvavidyālaya, 2003
- Kannaḍāyaṇa Priyadarśini Prakāśana, 1999
- Kannada śāsanagaḷa sāmskr̥tika adhyayana. 1966
- Hosatu hosatu Kannaḍa Viśvavidyālaya, 1993
- Grāmīṇa Bāpko Prakāśana, 1977
- Cidānanda samagra sampuṭa Sapna Book House, 2002
- Basavanna National Book Trust, India, 1972

== Awards ==
- Rajyothsava award
- Sahitya Akademi Award
- Pampa Award in 2002
- Alva's Nudisiri Award in 2006

== Illness and death ==
Chidananda Murthy was admitted to a private hospital in Bangalore on 9 January when he suffered difficulties in breathing. The doctors reported blockage of windpipe by dry cough. His son said that Murthy had stopped solid intakes and was only consuming fluids from past few months, due to his varying health conditions.

However Chidananda Murthy died two days later after the admission to the hospital, on 11 January 2020 at around 4am. His mortal remains were kept at the city residence in Bangalore for the people to express their last respects. Several dignitaries like B. S. Yediyurappa, S. L. Bhyrappa, S. Suresh Kumar, V. Somanna expressed their condolences to the veteran's death. The government announced the last rites to be performed with full state honours and respect.

== See also ==
- Kannada
- Kannada literature

== Sources ==
- `Religion-neutral society must for secularism' The Hindu – 10 May 2004
