= T. S. Venkannayya =

Kannada writer, professor and activist (1885–1939)

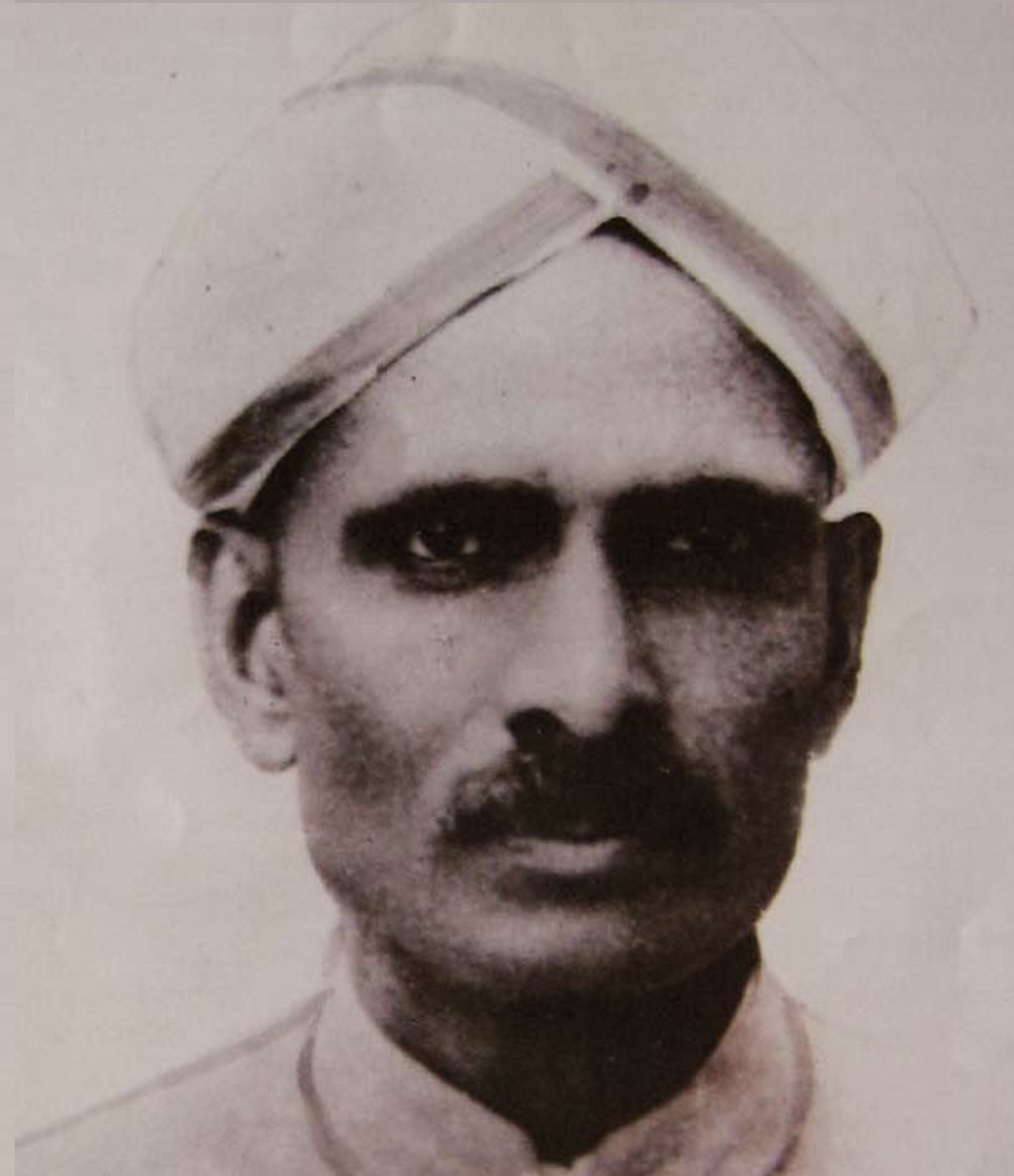
- Born: 1 October 1885; Talaku, Challakere, Chitradurga, Kingdom of Mysore, British India
- Died: 14 February 1939 (aged 53); Kingdom of Mysore, British India
- Education: Maharaja College, Mysore
- Occupations: Kannada writer; Teacher; Professor; Editor; Translator; Activist
- Spouse(s): Bhageerathamma, Rukmini
- Relatives: T. S. Venkannaiah, T. S. Shama Rao, T. R. Subba Rao, Belagere Krishna Sastry
- Writing career
- Pen name: Taľakina Venkannayya
- Language: Kannada, Old Kannada, Bengali, Sanskrit, English
- Period: 1920–35
- Notable works: Sri Ramakrishna Paramahamsara Charitre, Sri Ramakrishna Paramahamsara Leelaprasanga, Prachina Sahitya, Harischandrakavya Sangraha, Kannada Sahitya Charitre Mathu Ithara Lekhanagalu
- Website: T. S. Venkannayya

Taľaku Subbanna Venkannayya (1 October 1885 – 14 September 1939) was University of Mysore's first Kannada Professor. He was also a popular Kannada writer, translator, editor and teacher who nurtured many later Kannada littérateurs like Kuvempu, D. L. Narasimhachar, T. N. Srikantaiah, K. S. Narasimhaswamy, M. V. Seetharamaiah, C. K. Venkataramaiah, K. Venkataramappa, G. Venkatasubbiah and S. V. Parameshwara Bhatta. In fact, Kuvempu begins his book Sri Ramayana Darshanam with a two-page dedication to his teacher T. S. Venkannayya. T. S. Venkannayya translated the biography of Ramakrishna Paramahamsa from Bengali into Kannada for the first time in 1919. T. S. Venkannayya along with D. V. Gundappa, V. Seetharamaiah, B. M. Srikantaiah and T. N. Srikantaiah were at the forefront of the Kannada Movement from 1920s onwards and were instrumental in the founding of Kannada Sahitya Parishat (Bangalore) and Kannada Sangha (Kannada Literary Association) at Central College, Bangalore and Maharaja College, Mysore. T. S. Venkannayya was responsible for the organising of the 1931 Kannada Sahitya Sammelan (literary summit) at Mysore.

== Early years ==
Venkannayya was born on 1 October 1885 in Taľaku village of Chitradurga district in Karnataka, India. His parents were Taľaku Subbanna and Lakshmidevamma. Venkannayya's ancestors belonged to the Mulukanadu sect of Telugu speaking Brahmins. At a young age he was introduced to theological texts and epics like Ramayana, Mahabharata and Bhagavad Gita.

== Education ==
He had his preliminary schooling in the A. V. School at Challakere where he passed his Kannada lower secondary exam in 1897 and English lower secondary exam in 1899. In his eighteenth year, he was sent to Mysore for further studies. His first year F. A. course was completed at Maharaja College, Mysore. For his second year F. A., he got himself transferred to Wardlaw college at Bellary and passed the same in 1904. Venkannayya passed his B. A. (Kannada) exam in 1908 from Maharaja College, Mysore. His attempts at completing a Law degree in Bombay were unsuccessful. He completed his M. A. in 1914 with a first class from Madras.

== Academician ==
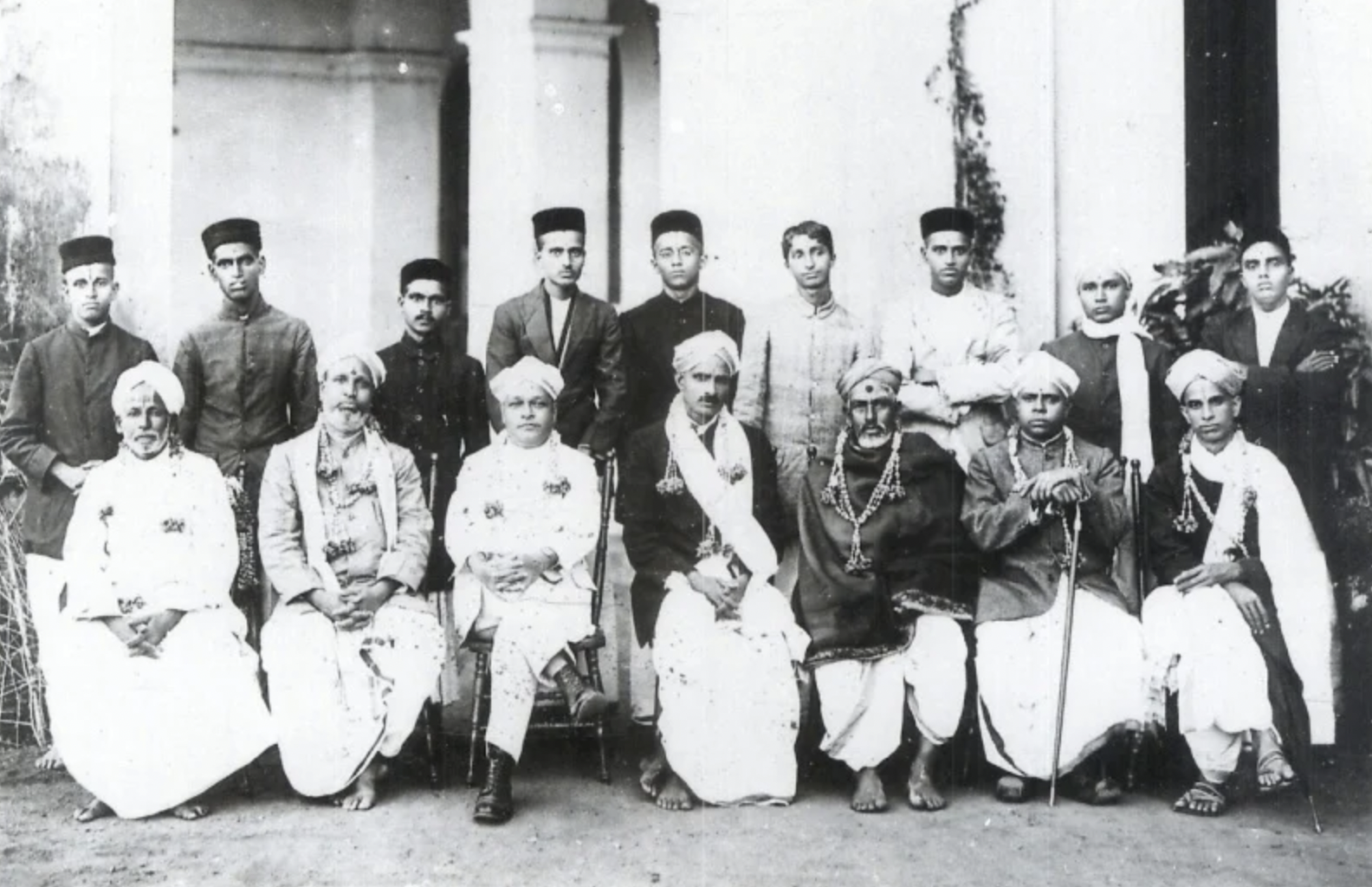
Maharaja College Group Photo (1940s) L - R: Standing: 6 from left (Kuvempu), 7 from left (T. N. Srikantaiah) Sitting on Chairs: 3 from left (B. M. Srikantaiah), 4 from left (T. S. Venkannayya)

Between 1910 and 1914, T. S. Venkannayya taught English, Kannada and later History in Basel Mission High School at Dharwad. After this he served as a History teacher for a year (1915) in St. Joseph's High School at Bangalore. From 1917 onwards, he served as Head Master in a Government High School at Doddaballapur. Following this he was transferred to Bangalore's Collegiate High School as an English teacher. By 1918, A. R. Krishnasastry got transferred from Central College, Bangalore to Maharaja College, Mysore. Venkannayya was offered his post at Central College. T. S. Venkannayya was appointed as an assistant professor in Kannada at Maharaja College, Mysore in 1926. A few years later, owing to the untimely demise of B. Krishnappa, Venkannayya was promoted to the post of Professor in the Kannada Department at the behest of B. M. Srikantaiah, N. S. Subba Rao and Metcalfe. He thus became University of Mysore's first Kannada Professor. Venkannayya was the founding member of the University Teacher's Association which later morphed into Prasaranga.

== Kannada Movement ==
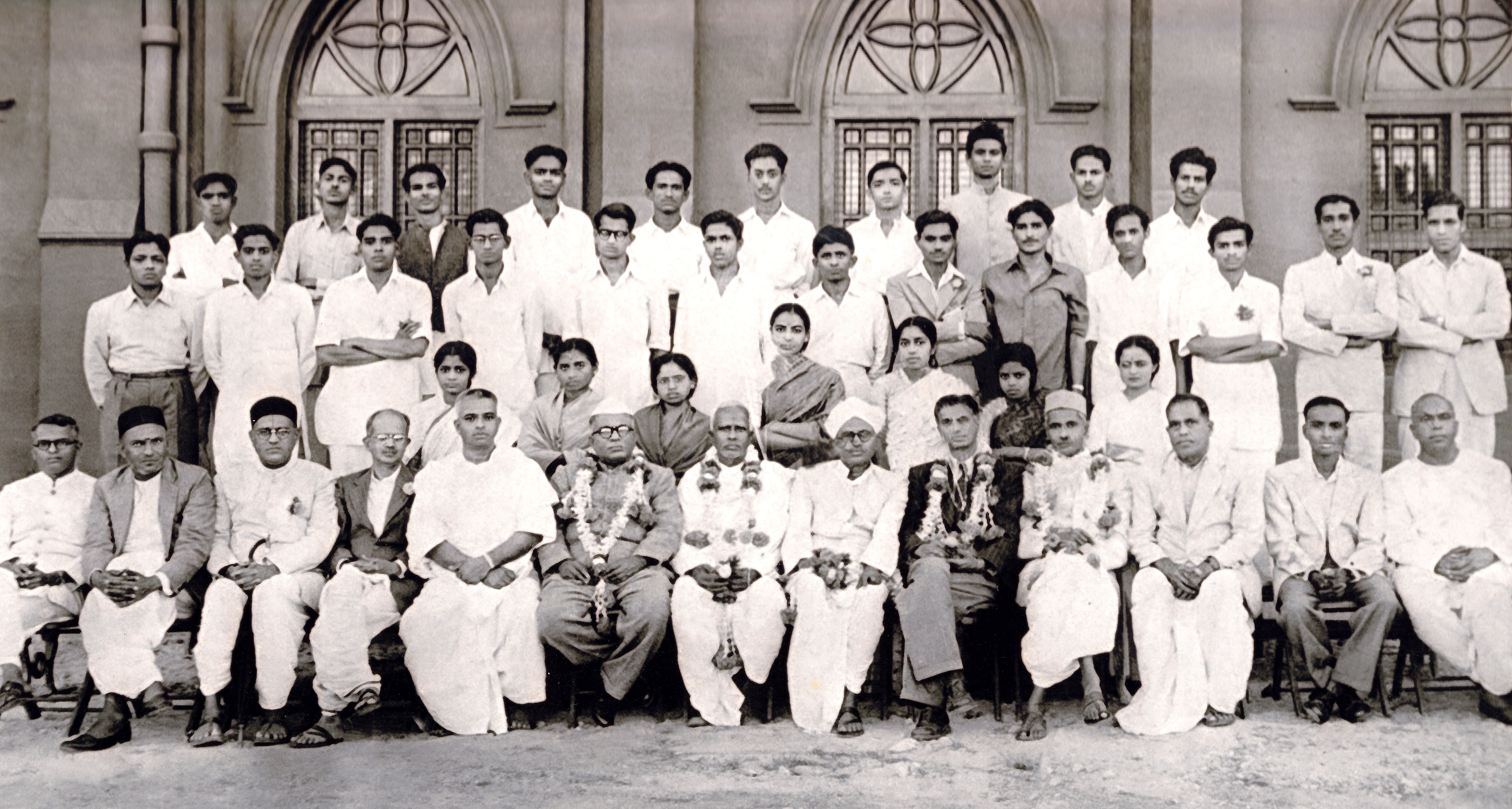
Central College Karnataka Sangha showing T. S. Venkannayya

Venkannayya was involved in the publishing functions of the Kannada Sahitya Parishat at Bangalore. His leadership at Prabhuddha Karnataka led to many early writers like V. Seetharamaiah, K. S. Narasimhaswamy, G. P. Rajarathnam and P. T. Narasimhachar come to light. Similarly, he was involved in the activities of Central College - Kannada Sangha where he organised many a Kannada and Sanskrit play to be enacted on stage. Venkannayya supervised the publication of Muddanna's works and the celebration of his birth anniversary. Venkannayya impressed upon his good friend A. R. Krishnashastry to adopt D. V. Gundappa's poem Vanasuma as the anthem for the Kannada Sangha at Central College, Bangalore. He was also involved in the orchestration of Kumaravyasa Jayanthi. While at Maharaja College, Mysore T. S. Venkannayya was instrumental in starting student journals Kiriya Kanike and Taliru. He encouraged the staging of plays such as Nagananda, Saavina Samasye and Ashada Bhoothi. Venkannayya's organising abilities made the 1931 Kannada Sahitya Sammelan at Mysore a successful summit. Venkannayya arranged a concert by Bidaram Krishnappa and co-ordinated the staging of the famous play Aswathaman in this literary summit.

== Works ==
=== Translations ===
- Sri Ramakrishna Paramahamsara Charitre (along with A. R. Krishnasastry) (1919)
- Sri Ramakrishna Paramahamsara Leelaprasanga
- Prachina Sahitya (1948)
- Shakuntala, Miranda and Desdemona

=== Editorial Work ===
- Harischandrakavya Sangraha (with A. R. Krishnasastry) (1931)
- Karnataka Kadambari Sangraha (1933)
- Basavaraja Devara Ragale (1930)
- Pampabharata
- Kumaravyasa Bharata
- Bishmaparva Sangraha (with D. L. Narasimhachar, T. N. Srikantaiah) (1930)
- Rāghavāṅka Kaviya Siddharāma Cāritra (with D. L. Narasimhachar) (1941)
- Mahāśvēte (1959)

=== Articles ===
- Kannada Sahityada Charitre
- Hathaneya Shatamanada Karnataka Sahitya Charitre
- Hanneradu Hadimuru, Hadinalkane Shatamanagala Kannada Sahitya Charitre
- Kavirajamarga granthada karthru yaaru?
- Bijjalanu Jainane?
- Pampa Bharata
- Contributions to ‘Prabhuddha Karnataka
- Contributions to ‘Kannada Sahitya Parishat Patrike
- Kannada Kaipidi – Vol. IV (with B. M. Srikantaiah)
- Kannadadalli Boudha Sahitya Vithe?
- Nizam Karnatakada Surupuru Lakshmeeshana Oore?
- Shivathatvasara
- Contributions to Sadbohachandrike

== Legacy ==
T. S. Venkannayya died on 14 February 1939 at Mysore. Three Felicitation Volumes were brought forth in his honour in 1970, 1986 and 2011. A library was constructed with state aid in his native village of Taľaku and dedicated to his memory. It serves as a repository of over 50,000 rare books and manuscripts. While his literary output was less, the number of future poet laureates and Kannada littérateurs (like Kuvempu, D. L. Narasimhachar, T. N. Srikantaiah, K. S. Narasimhaswamy, M. V. Seetharamaiah, C. K. Venkataramaiah, K. Venkataramappa, G. Venkatasubbiah and S. V. Parameshwara Bhatta.) that he guided and nurtured as a mentor, remain as his lasting contribution to Kannada literary landscape.

== Bibliography ==
- Festschrift Volume (1986). Vinnayónnati.
- Sastry, T. V. Venkatachala (2000). T. S. Venkannayya: A Short Biography Mulukanadu Sabha, Mysore.
- Ramegowda (2017). T. S. Venkannayya: A Monograph on Modern Kannada Writer – Sahitya Akademi, Delhi.
- T. S. Gopal (2015). T. S. Venkannayya (Ed. Dr. Na. Someshwara)
- Savinenapu: Divangata Prof. T. S. Venkannayyavara Smaraka Grantha – 1970.
- D'Souza, Roque (2000). Poverty and Human Dignity: K.S. Kârantha Encountered from Vatican II Council. ISBN 9788174950673. pp. 217.
- S. Naganath, Bhagirath (2021). Memorable Mysoreans - A Collection of Biographical Sketches. ISBN 9781685097875; Publisher:Notion Press.pp. 64
- Das, Sisir Kumar (2005). A History of Indian Literature. Published by Sahitya Akademi. pp. 624.
- Karanth, Shivaram (2021). ಶಿವರಾಮ ಕಾರಂತರ ಲೇಖನಗಳು ಸಂಪುಟ - ೧. Published by B Malini Mallya. pp. 18.
- Schouten, Jan Peter (1995). Revolution of the Mystics - On the Social Aspects of Vīraśaivism. Published by Motilal Banarsidass Publishers. pp. 298.
- Gururajachar, S. (1974). Some Aspects of Economic and Social Life in Karṇāṭaka, A.D. 1000-1300. Published by Prasārānga, University of Mysore. pp. 13, 14, 258.
- Chidananda Murthy, M. (1972). Basavanna. Published by National Book Trust, India. pp. 109.
- Krishnamoorthy, K. (1976). A. R. Krishna Shastri. Published by Institute of Kannada Studies, University of Mysore. pp. 15.
- Amur, G. S. (2001). Essays on Modern Kannada Literature. Published by Karnataka Sahitya Academy. pp. 48,64,94.
- Ramanatha, N.; Bangalore K. Venkataraman (1997). Essays on Tāla and Laya. Published by Percussive Arts Centre. pp. 15
