= Venkatasubbaiah =

Venkatasubbaiah is a surname. Notable people with the surname include:

- G. Venkatasubbaiah (1913–2021), Indian writer, grammarian, editor, lexicographer, and critic
- Pendekanti Venkatasubbaiah (1921–1993), Indian politician
