= T. V. Venkatachala Sastry =

Indian Kannada-language writer, grammarian (born 1933)

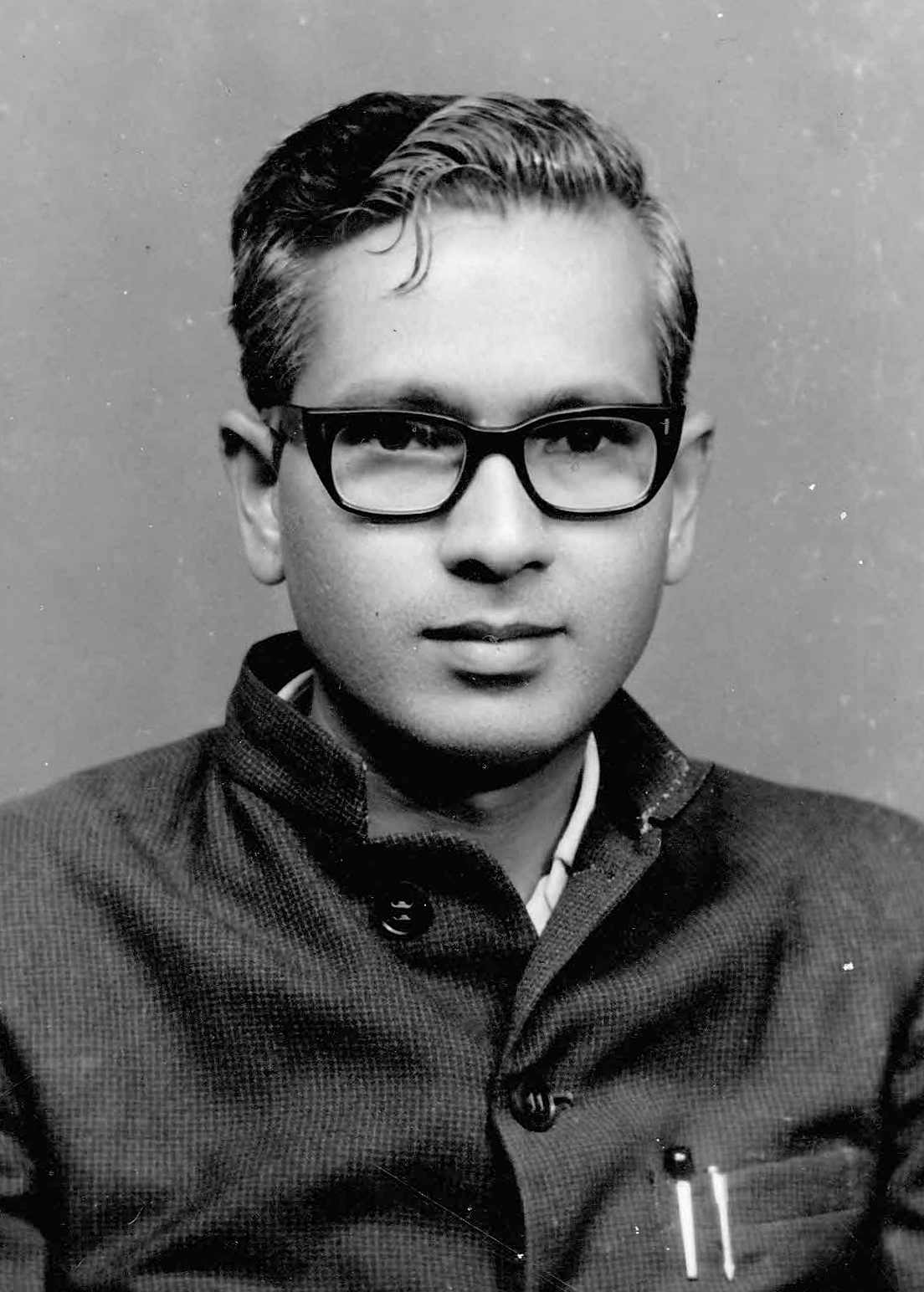
- Born: 26 August 1933 (age 93); Kanakapura, Bangalore, British India
- Education: Maharaja's College, Mysore
- Known for: see #Literary contributions
- Spouse: Venkatalakshmi
- Awards: see #Recognition
- Scientific career
- Fields: Kannada literature, Kannada grammar, criticism, editing
- Workplaces: Osmania University –Hyderabad, University of Mysore, B. M. Sri Pratisthana, Mulukanadu Mahasangha
- Website: www.srikanta-sastri.org/tvvenkatachalasastry

Togere Venkatasubbasastry Venkatachala Sastry, commonly known as T. V. Venkatachala Shastry, is a Kannada-language writer, grammarian, critic, editor and lexicographer. He has authored in excess of 100 books, translations and has edited collections of essays, biographical sketches and felicitation volumes. Recipient of the Kannada Sahitya Akademi Award (honorary), Sastry is an authority on Kannada language grammar and its various facets ranging from the metre scale (Kannada: ಛoದಸ್ಸು) on which he has written extensively to the history of Kannada literature spanning two millennia.

His book Mulukanadu Brahmanaru is a sociological study of the Mulukanadu community since the early 17th century, outlining their origin, migration and embrace of western education. It records in detail their history with over 50 family trees and assumes importance in the field of caste studies. Sastry was a Kannada professor at the University of Mysore and additionally held the post of director at "Kuvempu Kannada Adhyayana Samsthe" before retiring in 1994.

== Early life ==
=== Origins ===
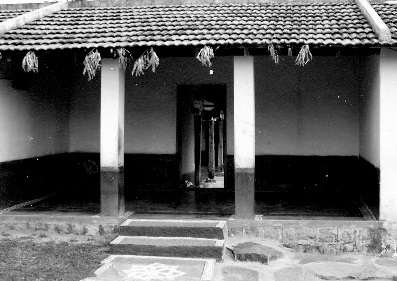
T. V. Venkatachala Sastry's birthplace (Harohalli Village, Kanakapura, Bangalore)

T. V. Venkatachala Sastry was born on 26 August 1933 at Harohalli village in Kanakapura taluk of Bangalore district to Brahmin parents Venkatasubba Sastry and Subbamma. The family belonged to the Smartha (Advaita) sect who are followers of Adi Shankaracharya and of the Sringeri Sharada Peetham. They belong to the Vaidiki Mulukanadu caste of Telugu-speaking Brahmins settled in the Kannada-speaking Mysore kingdom. Sastry's father had received a traditional education in the religious texts and puranas. He had been impressed with the practical work of the Ramakrishna Math in serving the common people. Sastry's mother was a home-maker and a deeply conservative lady.

=== Education ===
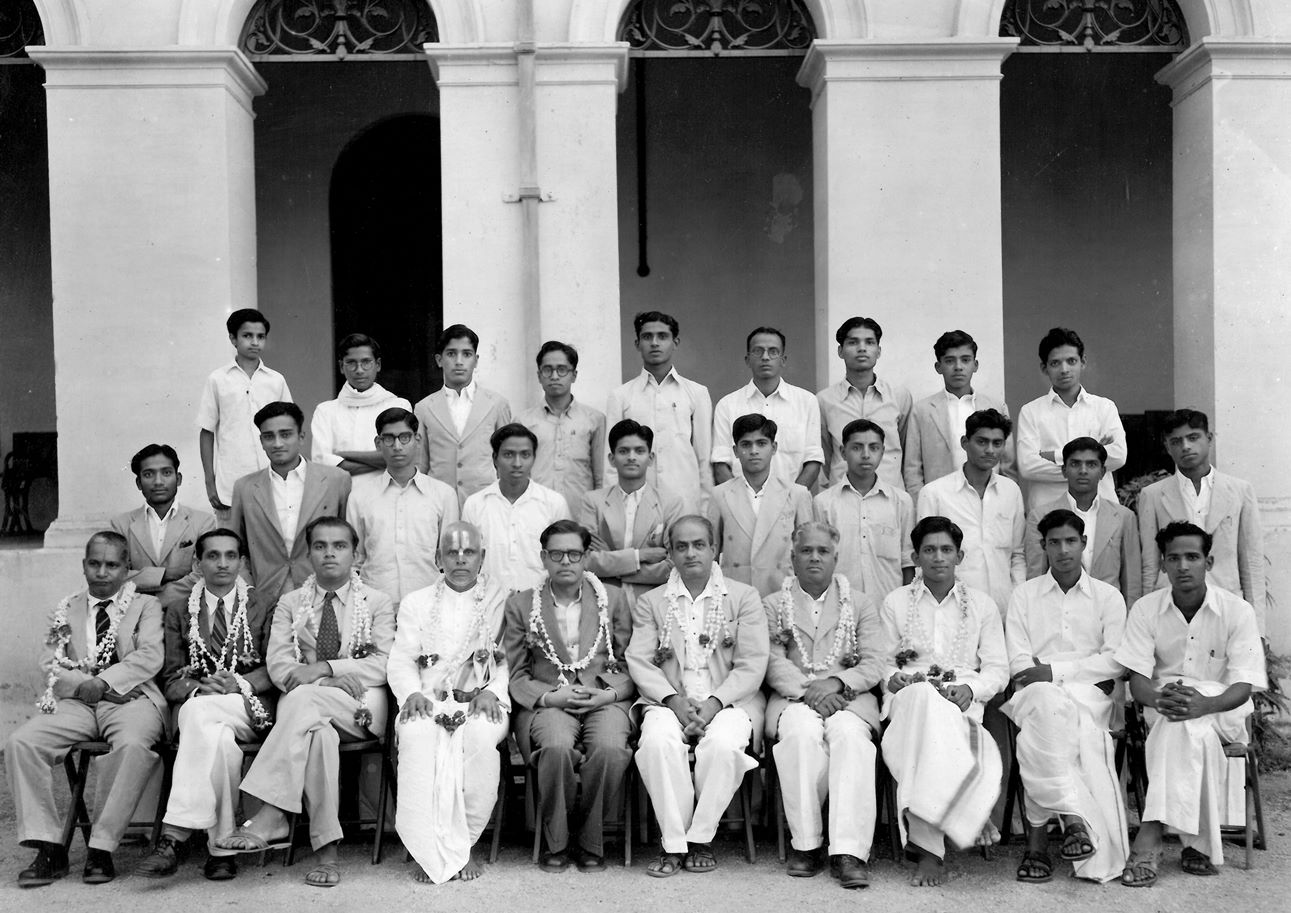
T. V. Venkatachala Sastry during his student years (Also seen, S.Srikanta Sastri, 5th from left, bottom row)

Sastry had his primary schooling at Kanakapura near Bangalore. He finished his Intermediate course in 1947–48 and from 1948 until 1954, he pursued undergraduate and post-graduate degrees at University of Mysore, where he enrolled initially in Yuvaraja College and came under the influence of Kannada professors N. Anantarangachar and U. K. Subbarayachar. In 1950, he joined the B. A. (Honours) course in Kannada at Maharaja College. Among his teaching faculty were renowned scholars like K. V. Puttappa (Kuvempu) who taught "Pampa Bharata" and "Literary Criticism", D. L. Narasimhachar (History of Literature), S. Srikanta Sastri (Cultural History of Karnataka)(see group photograph), K. V. Raghavachar (Kannada classic – "Basavarajadevara Ragale"), N. Anantarangachar (Kannada Grammar – "Shabdamanidarpana"), T. S. Shamarao (Vachanas of Basavanna) and Parameshwar Bhatt (Bharatesha Vaibhava). He worked on Pampa, Ranna, Harihara, Nemichandra, Raghavanka and Kumaravyasa utilizing ancient texts both from Mysore University library and the Oriental Research Institute, Mysore. He completed his Master of Arts (Kannada) degree from Maharaja College, Mysore in 1953–54 under the guidance of D. L. Narasimhachar.

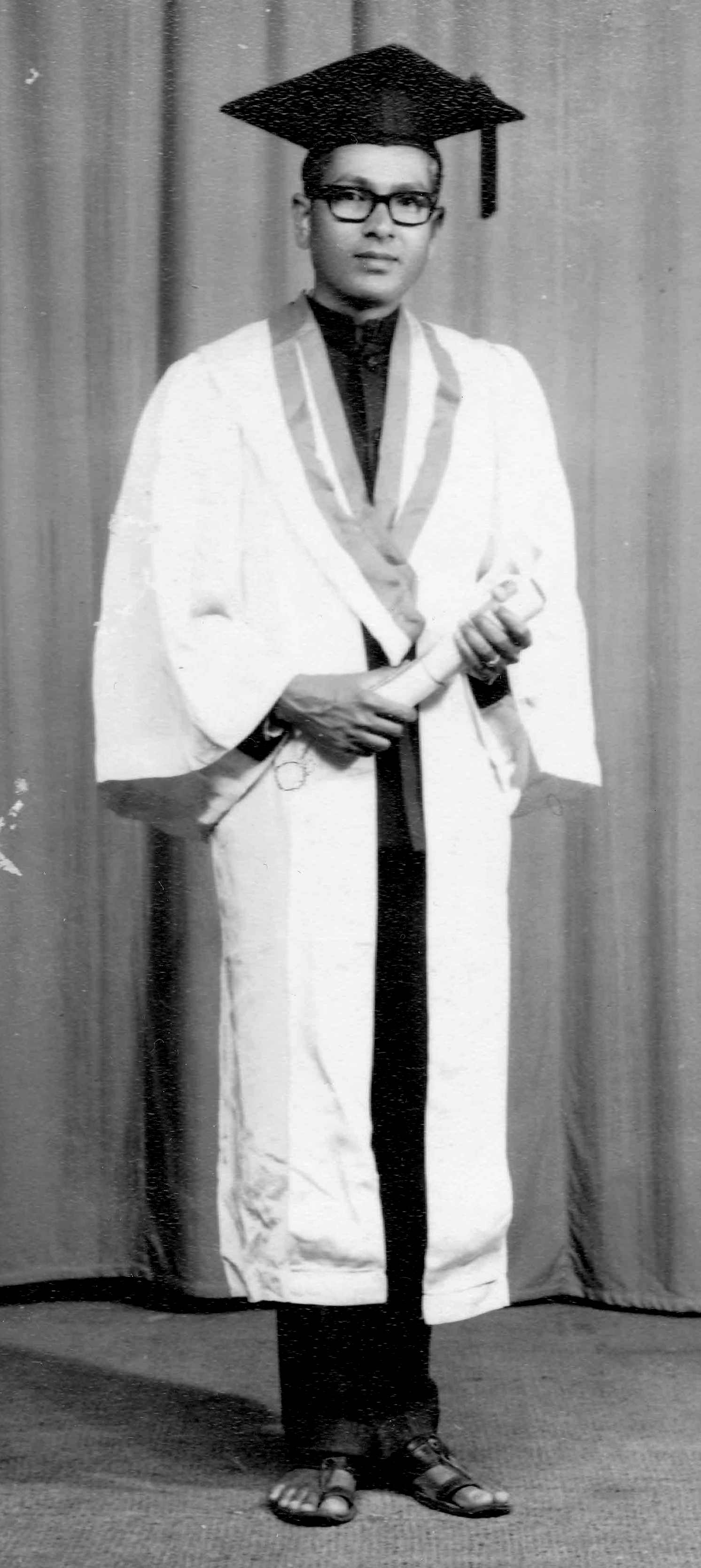
T. V. Venkatachala Sastry at his graduation (1953–54)

== Career ==
=== Osmania University ===
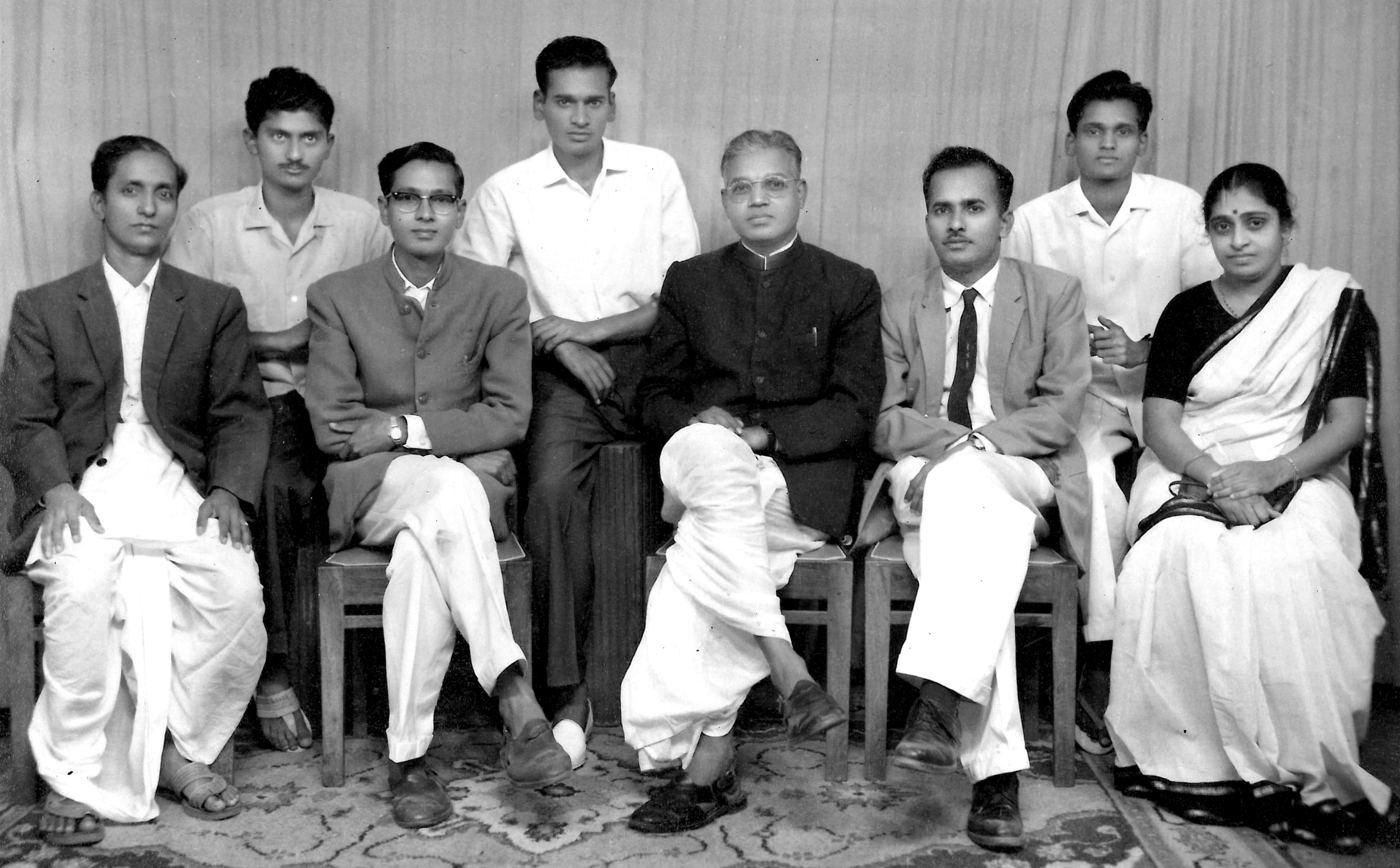
Sastry (front row, 2nd from left) with G. S. Shivarudrappa while at Osmania University

Sastry began his career as a lecturer at Kanakapura rural college in 1955. He moved to St. Joseph's College, Bangalore in 1957 and continued as a lecturer there until 1959. Subsequently, he was appointed as lecturer at Osmania University in Hyderabad, Andhra Pradesh in 1959 where he worked hard to lend shape to the nascent Kannada department. In addition to his teaching duties at the university, he also taught at several Women's and Arts Colleges. He involved himself in the affairs of the "Telugu Sahitya Akademi" and during these years put together his "Mahakavyalakshana". He translated Sophocles' "Trakiya Pengal" during his tenure at Osmania University. Later he translated "Prometheus Bound" by Aeschylus into Kannada. His dictionary titled "Sreevatsa Nighantu" took form while at Osmania University. After being transferred from women's college to the university's Post Graduate department, T. V. Venkatachala Sastry involved himself teaching topics like "Kannada Chandassu", Kannada Grammar and "Suktisudarnava". It was during these years that he set out to do doctoral research and this brought him closer to his former teacher and mentor D. L. Narasimhachar. In fact, D. L. Narasimhachar suggested a doctoral work on "Kannada Neminathapurana Tulanathmaka", which T. V. V. Sastry took up in earnest. In February 1968, University of Mysore's "Kannada Adhyayana Samsthe" embarked on organising a symposium to celebrate eighth centennial of Basavanna and requested T. V. V. Sastry at Osmania University to pen a paper on "Vachana Sahitya". Sastry took up the project, returning a 60-page document that caught the attention of Kannada Adhyayana Samsthe director and his former teacher D. Javaregowda, who with H. M. Nayak persuaded him to relocate to University of Mysore in 1968 to occupy the post of lecturer.

=== University of Mysore ===
Under the guidance of his former teacher and mentor D. L. Narasimhachar and H. M. Nayak, Sastry pursued his doctoral work on A Comparative Study of Kannada Neminathapuranas and earned his PhD by 1972. Two years later, he was made a Reader in the Kannada department and remained there until 1984 when he was elevated to the post of Professor. He continued as Professor for the next decade until his retirement in 1994. For the last few years of his tenure, he was given additional responsibilities as Director of Institute of Kannada Studies (1991 - 1993) and as Dean of Arts (1992 - 1993). Post-retirement, Sastry was visiting Professor in 1997 at Kannada University, Hampi.

=== Institute of Kannada Studies, Mysore ===
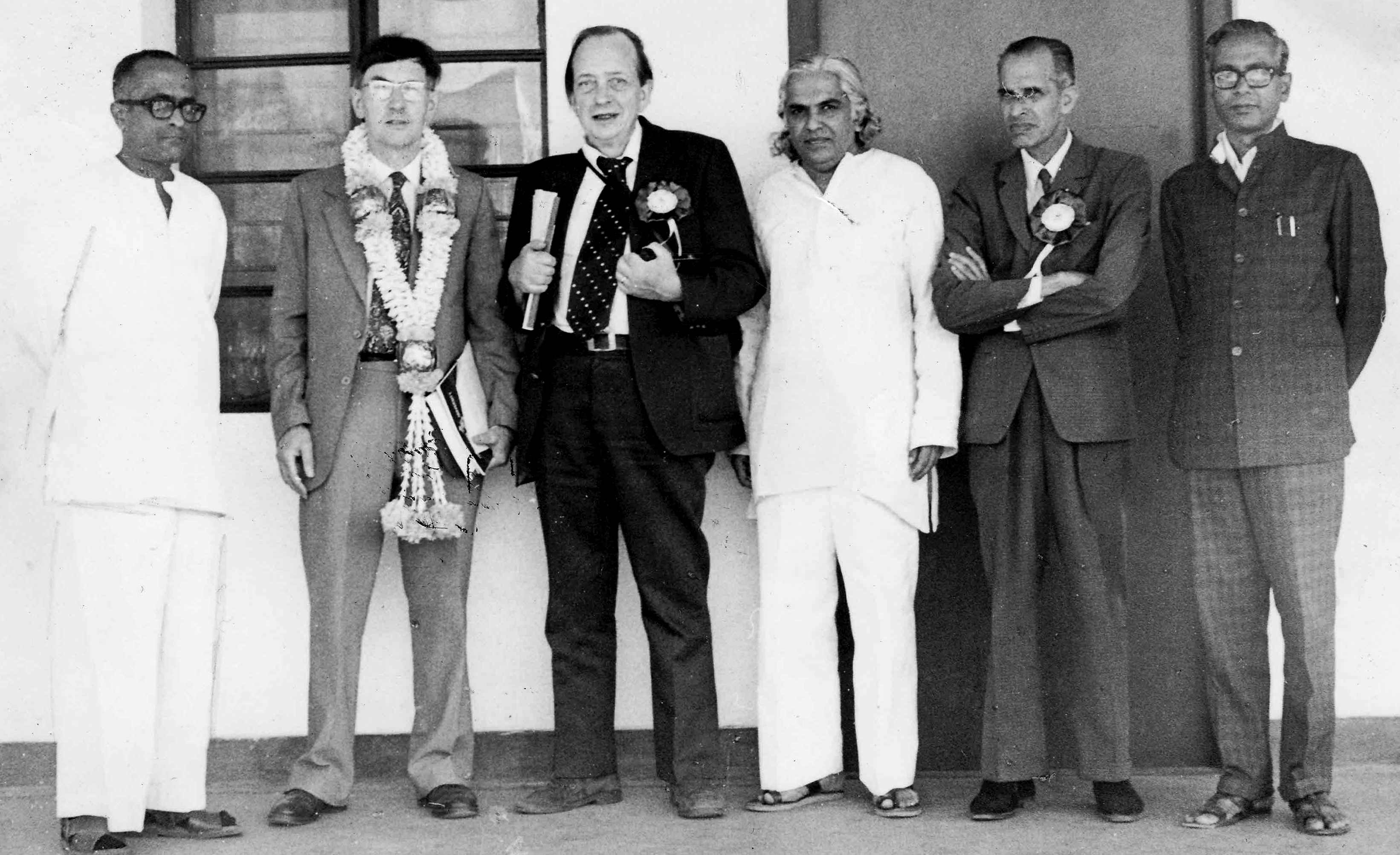
Mysore University group photo, 1956. T. V. Venkatachala Sastry with A. L. Basham

University of Mysore's Kannada Adhyayana Samsthe's prominent publications such as "Kannada Sahitya Charitre", "Kannada Chandassina Charithre", "Kannada Vishaya Viswakosha", and "Epigraphia Carnatica" owe a great deal to Sastry's erudition, perseverance and steadfast administrative acumen. His skills as an editor helped assemble and streamline many of these volumes in addition to several felicitation volumes for eminent personalities.

== Literary contribution ==
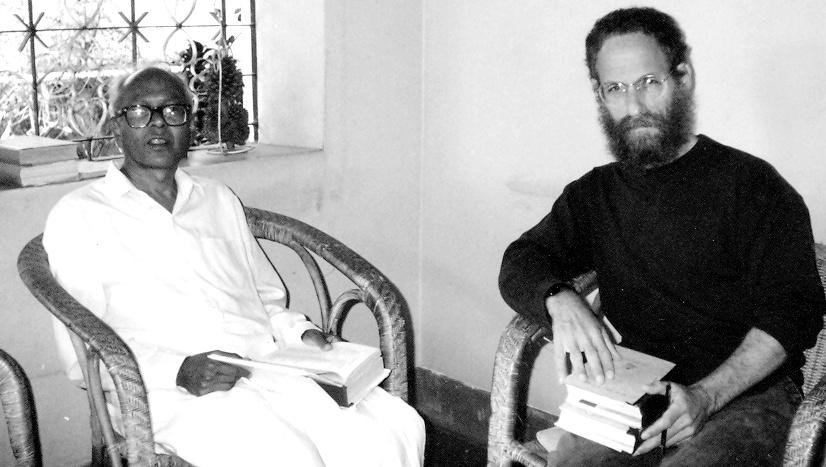
Sastry with Indologist Sheldon Polloc

Sastry's writings span over four decades and number in excess of 100. They encompass topics such as the history of Kannada literature, prosody, literary criticism, Kannada grammar, Kannada poetry, dictionary writing and editing, editing, and translations.

He was the first to offer an elaborate discussion on Devachandra's Rajavalikathe and Kempunarayana's Mudra Manjusha, and his PhD attracted considerable attention in literary circles. He has authored close to seven works on Grammar, six on Prosody, two on Aesthetics, six different dictionaries on various subjects, 24 studies on Literary Criticism and Research studies, eleven biographies, twenty two edited volumes and prose works, four translations and four bibliographies. In addition to these, he has penned four plays and four collections of essays. Various articles were collectively brought out in ten volumes under the title of Śāstrīya: Samputagalu 1, 2, 3, 4, 5, 6 which was published in 1999. As an editor Sastry has led such projects as History of Kannada Literature (Mysore University), Revision and Reprint of Epigraphia Carnatica, Kannada Dictionary Project of Kannada Sahitya Parishat, Anthology of Ancient Literature, Revision and Prose Translation of Kumaravyasa Bharata by Kannada Gamaka Parishat and publication of Complete Jaina Literature by Kannada University, Hampi. Significant among the scholars who came to him were Prof Laurie Honke (Finland), Prof Showman (Canada), Prof Karl Johanssen (U.S.A), Prof Sefan Anacker (Switzerland) and the Indologist Prof Sheldon Pollock (U.S.A).

=== Research and literary criticism ===
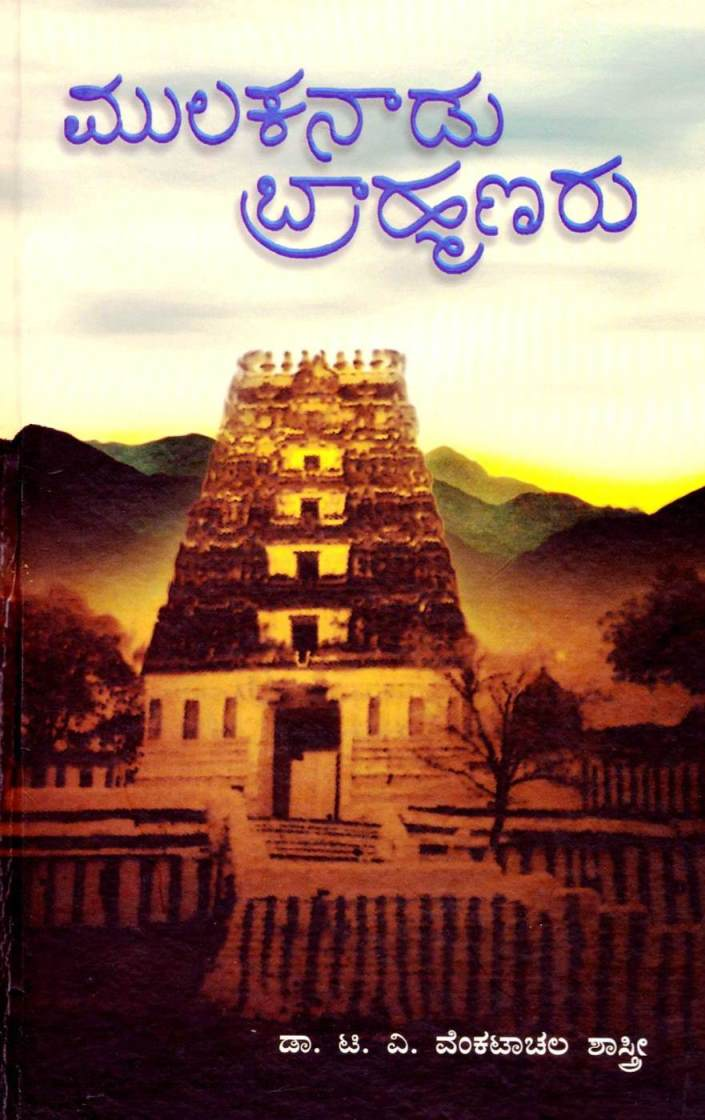
"Mulukanadu Brahmanaru" by T. V. Venkatachala Sastry

- 1972 - Sāhitya Manthana
- 1973 - Kannaḍa Nēminatha Purāṇagaḷa Taulanika Adhyayana
- 1974 - Chamundaraya
- 1979 - Shabdarthavihara
- 1980 - Jaina Bhagavatha Bharathagalu: Ondu Sameekshe
- 1981 - Prācīna Kannaḍa Sāhitya, Kelavu Nōṭagaḷu
- 1981 - Muru Sameekshegalu
- 1982 - Hosagannada Sahitya: Kelavu Notagalu
- 1983 - Namma Karnataka
- 1983 - Pampa
- 1991 - Haleya Honnu
- 1999 - Śāstrīya: Samputagalu 1, 2, 3, 4, 5, 6
- 2000 - Mulakanāḍu Brāhmaṇaru: Samudāya, Saṃskrti
- 2007 - Kanakapura Emba Kānakāna Haḷḷiya Charitre
- 2009 - Kannaḍa abhijāta sāhitya : adhyayanada avakāśagaḷu, ahvānagaḷu

=== Grammar ===
- 1990 - Hosagannadada Vyakarana
- 1994 - Keshirajavirachita Shabdamanidarpanam
- 1997 - Keshirajavirachita Shabdamanidarpanam
- 2001 - Darpaṇavivaraṇa

=== Poetry ===
- 1969 - Mahakavyalakshana
- 1987 - Kannaḍa Citrakāvya: Svarūpa, Itihāsa, Vimarśe

=== Plays ===
- 1966 - Baddha Prometheus (Greek Original – "Prometheus Bound" by Sophocles)
- 1971 - Kamsa
- 1978 - Trakiya Pengal (Greek Original – "Trakiya Pengal" by Aeschylus)
- 1981 - Hosagannada Mitravinda Govinda

=== Prosody ===
- 1970 - Kannaḍa Chandassu
- 1978 - Kannada Chandahswarupa
- 1989 - Kannaḍa Chandōvihāra
- 2003 - Kannada Chandomimamse
- 2007 - Chandombudhi
- 2013 - Kannaḍa Chandaḥkōśa

=== Lexicography ===
- 1971 - Śrīvatsa nighaṇṭu
- 1977 - Kannada Ratnakosha
- 1994 - Gajashastrashabdakosha
- 2004 - Granthasampadhana Paribhashakosha
- 2018 - Acchagannada Prani Padakosha

=== Biographies ===
- 1980 - Mahamahopadhyaya R. Shamasastry
- 1983 - Rao Bahadur M. Shama Rao
- 1985 - Sahitya Shilpigalu
- 1995 - A. R. Krishnashastry
- 2002 - Mārgadarśaka Mahanīyaru
- 2004 - Bhārataratna Sir M. Viśvēśvarayyanavara Pūrvajaru
- 2005 - Aaptaru Acharyaru
- 2005 - Sri Sahajanandabharathi Swamigalu
- 2007 - Dr A. Venkatasubbaiahanavaru

=== Editorship ===
- 1971 - Kavyasanchaya – Part 1 (Co-edited with others)
- 1973 - Srikanthika: Prof S. Srikanta Sastri Felicitation Volume
- 1974 - Kannada Adhyayana Samstheya Kannada Sahitya Charitre Samputa 1 – 5
- 1973–1993 - Epigraphia Carnatica
- 1975 - Samshodhana Lekhanagalu – S. Srikanta Sastri (Co-edited with others)
- 1970–1975 - Prabhuddha Karnataka
- 1976–1995 - Kannada Sahitya Parishattina Kannada Nighantu
- 1978 - Kavyasanchaya – Part 2 (Co-edited with others)
- 1978–79 - Karnataka: Kannada Vishaya Viswakosha
- 1982–92 - Karnataka Lochana
- 1983 - Swasthi – T. S. Shamarayara Felicitation Volume
- 1986 - Prakthana – R. Narasimhacharyara Lekhanagalu, Bashanagalu
- 1986 - Prof D. L. Narasimhacharyara Rudranatakopanyasagalu
- 1986 - S. G. Narasimhacharyara Kavithegalu
- 1987 - Gamaka Manjusha
- 1987 - Chamarasa (Co-edited with others)
- 1988 - Gadya Kusumanjali (Co-edited with others)
- 1988 - Bahubhashika Nighantu Yojane – Asian Studies Association (Chennai)
- 1990 - Kannada Kavigalu Kanda Gommateshwara
- 1991 - Anukarana Gita Lahari
- 1991 - Kannada Chennudi
- 1991 - Kavyavahini: Dasara Kavisammelanada Kavanagalu
- 1992 - Kavyasriranga: Dasara Kavisammelanada Kavanagalu
- 1992 - Alauddin mathu Adbuthadeepa
- 1992 - Janapriya Prachinasahityamale
- 1993 - Prakrit Adhyayana Mathu Samshodhana Rashtriya Samsthe
- 1993 - Rashtriya Viswakosha Kendra – Bhubaneswar
- 1993 - Prachina Bharatiya Sahitya Sankalana Yojane
- 1995 - Abhijnana – Dr. K. Krishnamurthy Felicitation Volume
- 1995 - Pampakavi Virachitam Aadipuranam – S. G. Narasimhachar
- 1998 - Kannada Sahitya Parishathina Kannada–Kannada–English Nighantu (1)
- 1999 - Mudramanjusha
- 2000 - Mulukanadu Mahaniyara Granthamale
- 2001 - Mysore Mulukanadu Sabha (R) & Mulukanadu Charitable Trust
- 2001 - Dr A. Venkatasubbaiahanavara Samshodhana Lekhanagalu
- 2002 - Mulukanadu Siri
- 2003 - Kannada Kavyagala Alankaragalu – Kannada Sahitya Parishathu
- 2003 - Siribhuvalaya
- 2005 - Kavyajinashtakagalu
- 2006 - Boppannapanditana Gommatajinendra Gunastavam
- 2007 - Pampasamputa
- 2008 - Karyakarisamithi Sadasya – B. M. Sri Smaraka Pratishthana

=== Translations ===
- 1986 - Vedam Venkataraya Sastri
- 1987 - Harivamshapuranasaara
- 2002 - Karnaparyana Neminatha Purana Kathasaara
- 2002 - Ardhanemi Purana Kathasara, Vastu Vimarshe

=== Essays ===
- 1975 - Kavyachitragalu
- 1982 - Saddentembara Ganda
- 1990 - Melugāḷiya Mātugaḷu: Tombattu Cintanegaḷu
- 2002 - Udāracaritaru Udāttaprasaṅgagaḷu

=== Bibliographical work ===
- 1966 - A Descriptive Catalogue of Kannada Manuscripts in the Osmania University Library (Co-edited)
- 1978 - A Bibliography of Karnataka Studies – Vol I
- 1997 - A Bibliography of Kannada Ramayana
- 1998 - A Bibliography of Karnataka Studies - Vol II

== Recognition ==
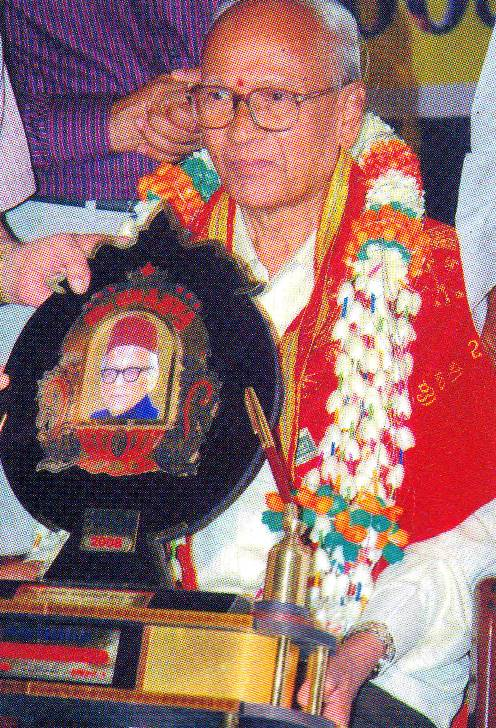
Sastry receiving the Masti Award (2008)

Sastry's vast contribution to Kannada Literature has been acknowledged with several awards and accolades. He is also recipient of the "Karnataka Sahitya Akademi Award" (Honorary) for 1997. He presided over the Dharmasthala Literary Festival in 2002. Some of the prominent awards are listed here.

- "Kannada Chandassu" (Kannada Sahitya Akademi) (1970)
- "Kannada Chitrakavya" (Kannada Sahitya Akademi) (1987)
- "Kannada Chandovihara" (Kannada Sahitya Akademi) (1989)
- "Karnataka State Devaraja Bahadur Award" (1972)
- "Mysore Viswavidhyalaya Suvarnamahotsava Award" (1978)
- "Mysore Viswavidhyalaya T. N. Srikantaiah Smaraka Award" (1978)
- "Dharwad Vidhyavardhaka Sangha Award" (1978)
- "Karnataka State Devaraja Bahadur Award" (1978)
- "Mysore Viswavidhyalaya T. N. Srikantaiah Smaraka Award" (1986)
- Mysore 'Granthaloka' Newspaper "Writer of the year" Award (1987)
- "Karnataka Sahitya Akademi Award" for best written work (1987)
- "I.B.H Sikhsana Trust, Mumbai Award" (1987)
- "University of Mysore Golden Jubilee Award" (1987)
- "Kannada Sahitya Parishathina Vajramahotsava Award" (1977)
- "Karnataka State Award" (1988)
- Felicitation from "S. B. Joshi Vicharavedike" (1994)
- Award for lifetime contribution from Shravanabelagola Vidyapeeta (1996)
- Honorary Award from "Karnataka Sahitya Akademi" (1997)
- "Sediyapu" Award, Udupi (1998)
- "Chidananda" Award, Bangalore (2001)
- "Bhashasamman" Award from Sahitya Akademi, New Delhi (2002)
- "S. B. Joshi" Award, Karnataka Sangha, Shimoga (2003)
- "Chavundaraya" Award, Kannada Sahitya Parishath (2003)
- "Alvas Nudisiri Award", Moodabidri (2005)
- "Sri Krishna" Award from Pejawar Mutt Swamiji (2006)
- "Aryabhatta" Award, Bangalore (2006)
- "Masti" Award, Bangalore (2008) (pictured)
- "Pampa" Award for Lifetime Contribution (2008)
- Nadoja Award, Kannada University, Hampi (2022)

== Legacy ==
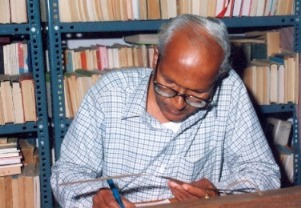
Sastry in his personal library.

Sastry currently resides in Mysore, India with his wife Venkatalakshmi and devotes his time to writing, reviewing, editing and critiquing literary works. As part of his felicitation for lifetime contribution to Kannada language and literature, two festschrift volumes "Srimukha" & "Kannada Meru" were presented. Sanskrit scholar Sheldon Pollock called him "greatest living scholar in the field of old Kannada".
