= T. S. Venkannaiah =

Indian author and educator (1941–2012)

TS Venkannaiah (Nephew)
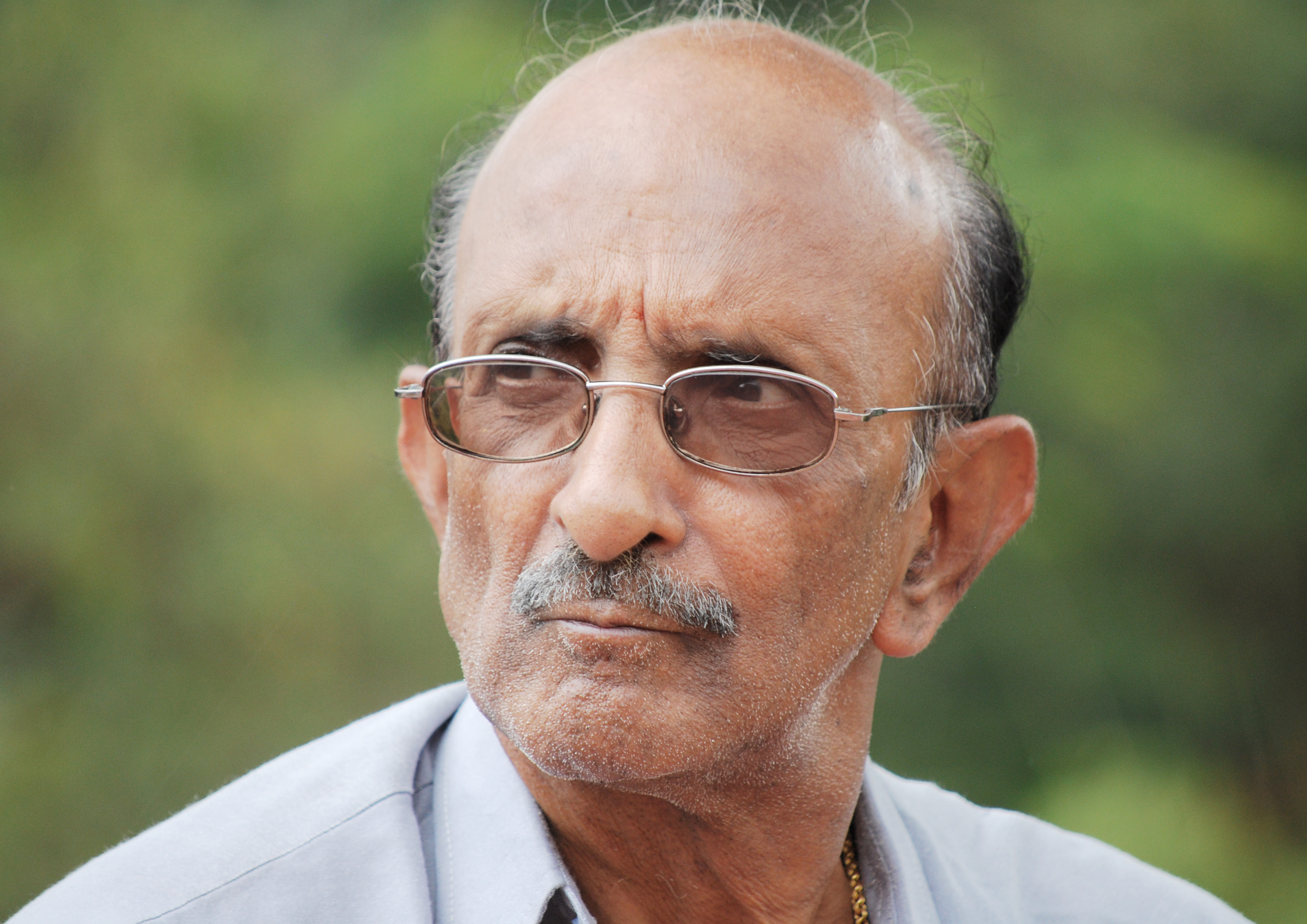
- Venakannaiah
- Born: 17 November 1941; Shimoga, Shimoga District, Karnataka State, India
- Died: 13 June 2012 (aged 70); Sringeri, Karnataka
- Occupations: Writer, professor
- Writing career
- Pen name: TSV
- Subject: Sanskrit
- Website: venkannaiah.blogspot.com

Taluku Shamarao Venkannaiah (17 November 1941 – 14 June 2012) was an Indian author and educator. Venkannaiah was born in Shimoga Shimoga district to a native Telugu family. He was named after his father's elder brother T. S. Venkannayya. Residing at Sringeri he had served as principal in JCBM College of Sringeri, Chikmagalur Dist, Karnataka State, South India.

He was a Sanskrit professor in JCBM college Sringeri. He translated many works and was a chief editor of magazines like Bhamathi (JCBM College magazine which won awards for many consecutive years during his time as editor), monthly Sadguru's Blessings of Harihara Pura Mat, and Seva Sadana of Gubbi Chidambarashram for many years. His translations include Will Durant's greatest work the History of Greece volume 9. He served as Sringeri Taluk Kannada Sahitya Parishat president.

== Education and career ==
Venkannaiah studied his primary and secondary education in Shimoga and later on moved to Mysore for higher studies. He completed his MA in Sanskrit from Mysore University in 1963 and worked as sub-editor in Adult Education Council, Mysore for six months and started his career as a high school teacher in Deshiya Vidyashala from 1964 to 1965. On 8 July 1965 he became a lecturer in JCBM College in Srigeri (the Sharada Peetham). He retired as principal of the same college on 30 November 1999.

== Works and message ==
For his works Venkannaiah was awarded Sahitya Siri by Kannada Sahitya parishat. He was against meaningless practices and rituals, and he was for true understandings of spiritual texts. His words are expressed in his commemoration volume Sahrudayi. Venkannaiah's writings vary from Sanskrit works to English and Telugu works.

== Bibliography ==
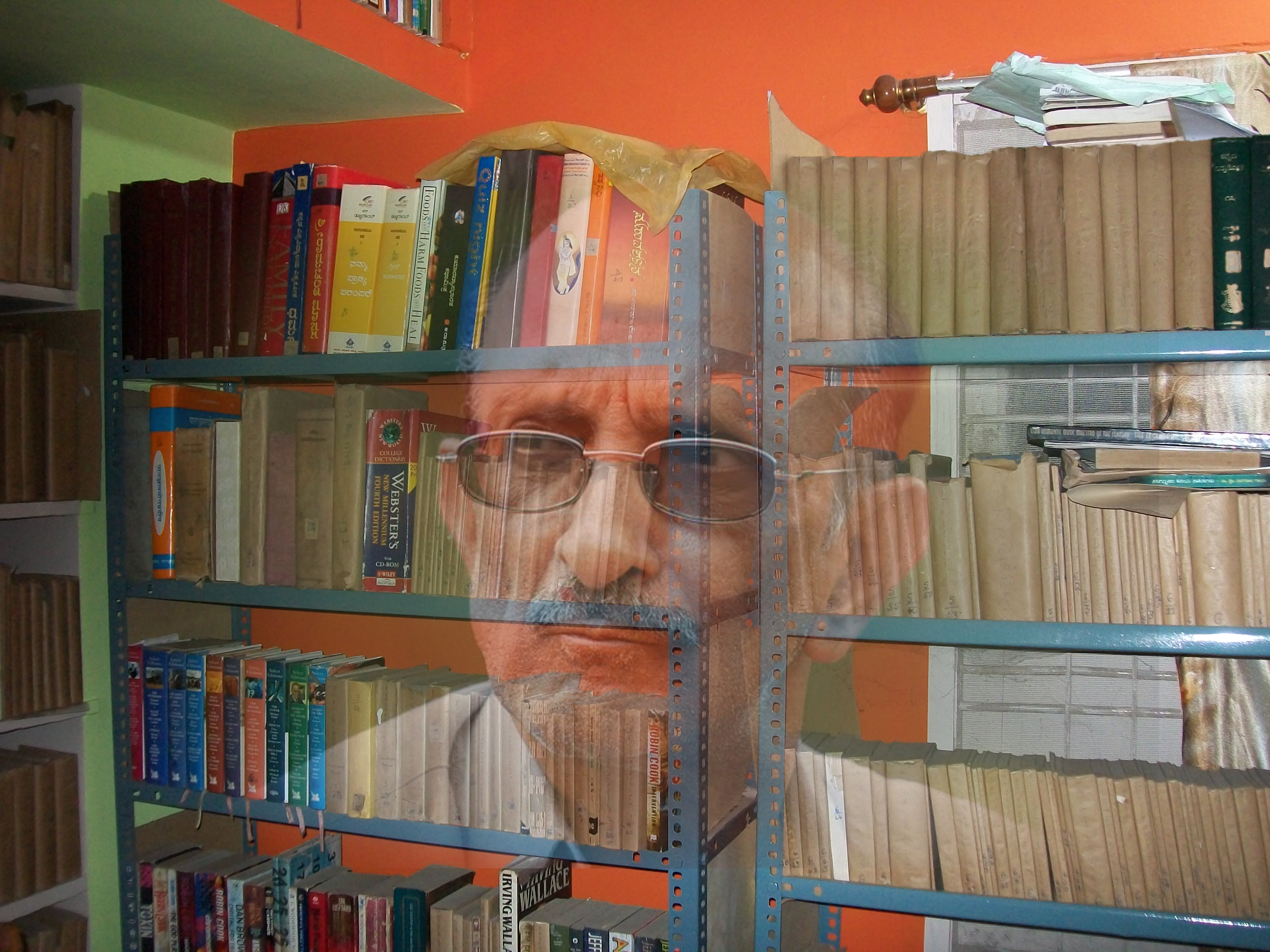
The thirst for knowledge was insatiable

=== Sanskrit to Kannada ===
- Sri Shankara's Bhajagovindam with special explanation
- Bharatiyare ecchara: Sri Dayananda sarasvati's Points to Ponder
- Upadesha Shatakam – Poet Gumani
- Six small story collection of Dharma Neeti and Subhashitagalannu
- Guruvamsha Kavya – Sri Kashi Lakshmana Shastri's
- Shrividyeya Sarasarvasva – Mahamanustava – by Kavya Kanta Ganapathi Shastri
- Somadeva's Kathasarithsagara 12–18 chapter translation to Kannada

=== English to Kannada ===
- Adyatmika sanjeevini – Swami Paramananda's Spiritual Healing
- Dhyanada acharane – swami rutajananda's Practice of meditation
- Bharatiyare ecchara – Sri Dayananda sarasvati's Points to Ponder
- Bhavanatmaka prabuddhate – Swami Dayananda sarasvati's Emotional Maturity
- Kristano krishnano – Sri Manoj Rakshit – Christ or Krishna
- Katha Kusuma – Sri Abhinava Vidyatirtha – Edifying parables
- On Avatara Meharbaba's jeevana sadhane mattu upadesha 4 kiruhottigegalu Kannada
- Wildurant's story of civilization 1 – 2 volumes- selected parts translation
- Wildurant's story of civilization 9 vol complete translation
- Ashayagalu mattu munnotagalu – k n munshi views and vistas
- Hindu Adarshagalu – K Balasubrahmanya Aiyyar's – Hindu Ideals
- Eivaru sahodararu – K N Munshi's The Five Brothers Part III

=== Telugu to Kannada ===
- Vedanthaa Kathavali part 1 – Shri Vidyaprakashanandagiri
- Vedantha Kathavali part −2 – Shri Vidyaprakashanandagiri
- Jeevana charitre "Late TS venkannaiah's Life history)
- Sri Sharada Peetha (Introduction to Sringeri Mahasamstana)

=== Edited works ===
- Kavya Pallava Kavana Sankalana Published by Sringeri Kannada Sahitya Parishat
- Seva Vishwa – Gubbi Chidambarashrama Seva Sadana Monthly magazine's 50th years Special edition
- Shatamanada Kavi Kuvempu – Kuvempu janma shatamanotsa's edition)
- Sankeerna – Vakrokti Siddhanta – Ondu Vishleshane (an analysis)
- Vishva Kosha of Mysore University

=== Other works ===
- More than 30 articles in many commemoration volumes and other special editions
- Preface to five Kavana sankalanas, three Katha Sankalanas, three Kadambaris, Bhakti Geethe, and stotra Grantha

=== Editorial works ===
- Gubbi "Sevasadana" 10 years since
- "Sadguru's Blessings" – English monthly of Sri hariharapura Temple from 2003 September to April 2011
- For 27 years worked as editor for JCBM College magazine "Bhamati"

=== Biography ===
- Sahrudayi (Commemoration volume) (Released on 3 March 2011 on attaining his 70th birthday by Mallepuram G Venkatesh -the first vice chancellor of Sanskrit University and published by Talukina Venkannaiah prakashana and Sharada Prakashana)
- Ta Sha Venkannaiah Marunenapu (Recollecting TSV) on the occasion of his death ceremony

=== Awards ===
- Sahitya Siri: On the occasion of 9th district Kannada Sahitya Sammelana on 22 May 2011 at Chikmagalur, Karnataka State, Sri TS Venkannaiah was awarded "Sahitya Siri" in recognition of his service to literature.

== See also ==
- Father of TS Venkannaiah – TS Shamarao
- Paternal Uncle of TSV Prof T. S. Venkannaiah
