= Kumudendu Muni =

Jain Digambar monk and polymath, possible author of Siribhoovalaya

- ಕುಮುದೇಂದು ಮುನಿ
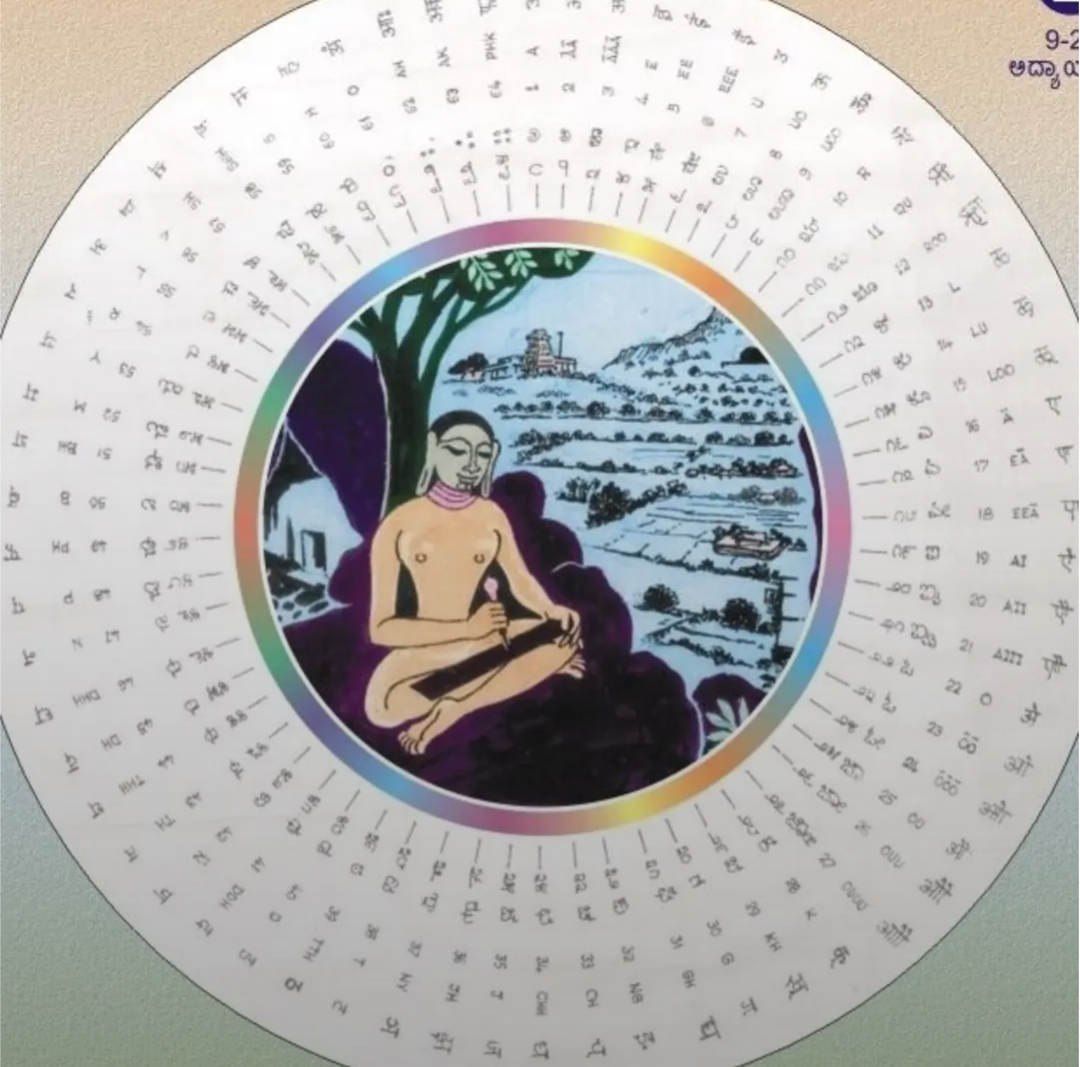
- Kumudendu Muni Author of "siribhoovalaya"
- Title: Jain monk, scholar, polymath

Personal life
- Born: Karnataka, India
- Notable work: Siribhoovalaya
- Known for: Author of the Siribhoovalaya

Religious life
- Religion: Jainism
- Sect: Digambara

Religious career
- Teacher: Virasena
- Period in office: 9th–10th century CE
- Disciples: Amoghavarsha I, Shivamara II

Kumudendu Muni (Around 840 CE) was a Jain Digambar monk and polymath from Karnataka, India. He is traditionally credited with the authorship of the Siribhoovalaya, a literary and scientific work written entirely in Kannada numerals. This work is believed to encode content across multiple Indian languages, disciplines, and philosophical systems using intricate mathematical grids and cipher techniques. The Siribhoovalaya is believed to contain valuable information about a wide range of subjects including mathematics, chemistry, physics, metallurgy, astronomy, medicine, history, and even space travel. Kumudendu's work covers topics related to religion, science, literature, and cryptology, although much of it remains undeciphered.

== Background ==
Kumudendu is described in his own writings as a disciple of the Jain Acharya Virasena, who composed the Dhavala and Jayadhavala commentaries. He is also said to have been the guru of Rashtrakuta king Amoghavarsha I and the Ganga Dynasty king Shivamara II. Although the exact dates of Kumudendu's life remain uncertain, scholars generally place him in the 9th century CE, based on his association with historical figures such as Amoghavarsha I and Virasena.

== Siribhoovalaya ==
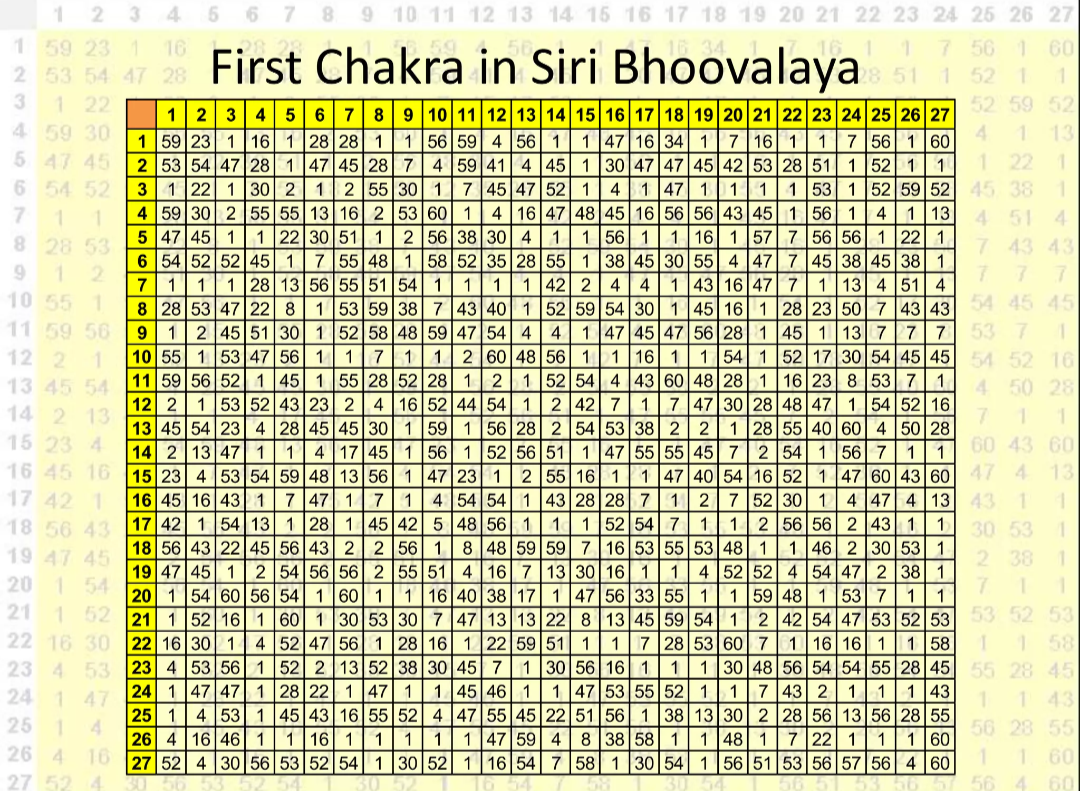
First Chakra of "siribhoovalaya"

Kumudendu Muni's most well-known work is the Siribhoovalaya, a unique text composed entirely in Kannada numerals (1–64) rather than letters. It reportedly contains around 600,000 verses, arranged in mathematical grids known as Chakras, typically measuring 27×27 cells. The work does not use any traditional alphabet, instead, it employs numerical codes that are deciphered using specific keys to reveal verses in multiple scripts and languages.

== Structure and encoding ==
The Siribhoovalaya employs a system of cipher patterns (bandhas) and numerical codes to encode content drawn from over 18 scripts and more than 700 languages, including Kannada, Sanskrit, Prakrit, Telugu, Tamil, Apabhransha, and Malayalam. The same set of numbers, when interpreted using different keys, can yield entirely distinct content. The system integrates elements of Jain cosmology, binary logic, and encryption techniques that some scholars compare to modern data encoding methods.

== Contents ==
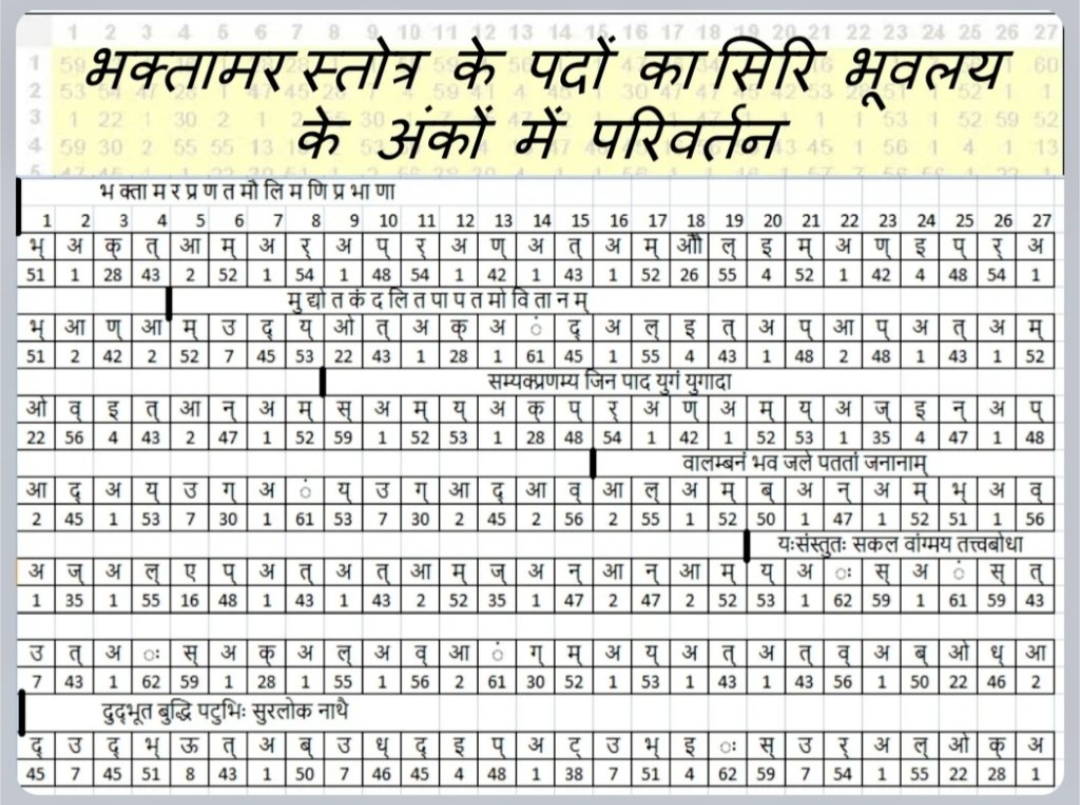
Numerical script sample of Jain Stotra Bhaktambar

Only one chapter out of the original 26 is currently known to have survived, and only three Chakras (number grids) have been partially decoded. The decoded portions include Jain philosophical verses along with content pertaining to mathematics, astronomy, chemistry, metallurgy, medicine, and references that some interpret as relating to space travel. The text is also believed to embed encoded versions of major Jain works such as the Bhaktamara Stotra, Dhavala, Jayadhavala, commentaries, as well as Jain retelling of the Ramayana and Mahabharata.

== Interpretation and legacy ==
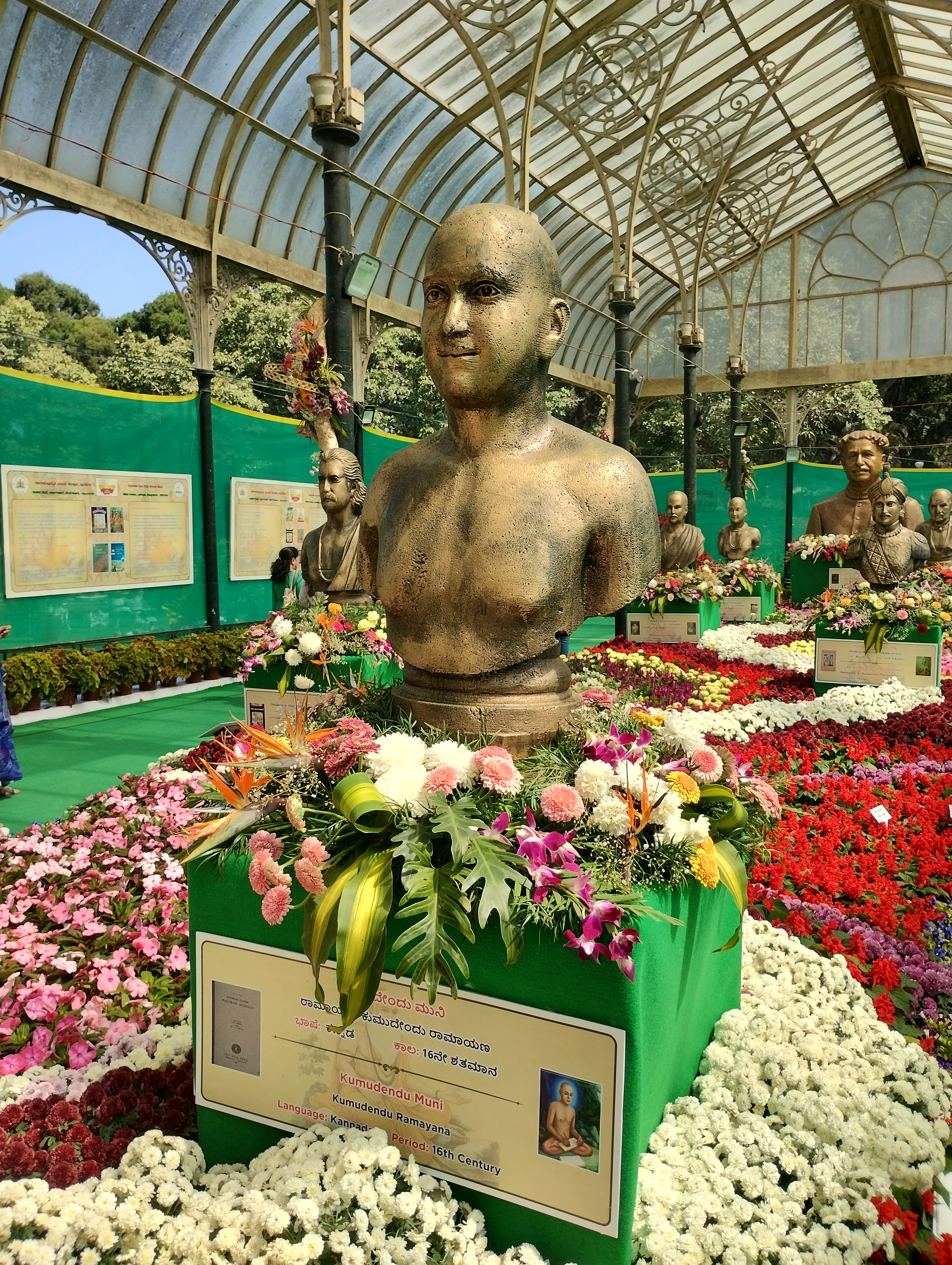
Bust of poet Kumudendu Muni at Lal Bagh, Bangalore, Photographed in January 2025

Scholars such as T. V. Venkatachala Shastry and Anil Jain have undertaken efforts to decode the Siribhoovalaya, although the majority of the text remains undeciphered due to its complex structure. According to Jain tradition, the work is believed to contain answers to 600,000 fundamental questions about the universe, embedded within its encrypted verses.

Dr. Rajendra Prasad, the first President of India, is reported to have described the Siribhoovalaya as the "eighth wonder of the world" in recognition of its scale, ambition, and the intellectual complexity involved in its composition. Scholars such as D. L. Narasimhachar and Shatavadhani R. Ganesh have interpreted the siribhoovalaya as a comprehensive poetic work that integrates elements of spirituality, science, and linguistics.

== Historical and cultural importance ==
The Siribhoovalaya is regarded not only as a literary achievement but also as evidence of the intellectual contributions of Jain monks in medieval South India. Kumudendu Muni's method of multi-script numerical encoding has been described by scholars such as D. L. Narasimhachar and Pandit Yellappa Shastri as unique in world literary history, and it continues to attract the attention of linguists, cryptographers, and historians, especially in the context of Indian poetics, linguistic encoding, and Jain literary traditions. His work reflects the interdisciplinary nature of ancient Jain scholarship, integrating elements of religion, science, art, and logic within a unified textual framework.

== See also ==
- Jain literature
- Rashtrakuta dynasty

== Bibliography ==
- Shastry, T. V. Venkatachala (1953). Śribhoovalaya of Kumudendu Muni: Mathematical Structure and Multilingual Code. Bangalore: Kannada Sahitya Parishat. OCLC 59023839.
- Dundas, Paul (2002). The Jains (2nd ed.). London: Routledge. ISBN 041526605X. OCLC 252916273.
- Tiwari, Manisha (2011). "Siribhoovalaya: A Multilingual Numerical Manuscript". Journal of South Asian Studies. 24 (3): 55–72. OCLC 820692563.
- Nagarajaiah, Hampa (1999). Jainism in Southern Karnataka. Bangalore: Sapna Book House. OCLC 45166444.
- Jain, Anil. Decoding the Siribhoovalaya. New Delhi: Bharatiya Jnanpith, 2002. ISBN 8126309242
- Settar, S. Jaina Art and Architecture, Vol. 2. Delhi: Agam Kala Prakashan, 1989. ISBN 8170172305
