= Siribhoovalaya =

Jain epic poem

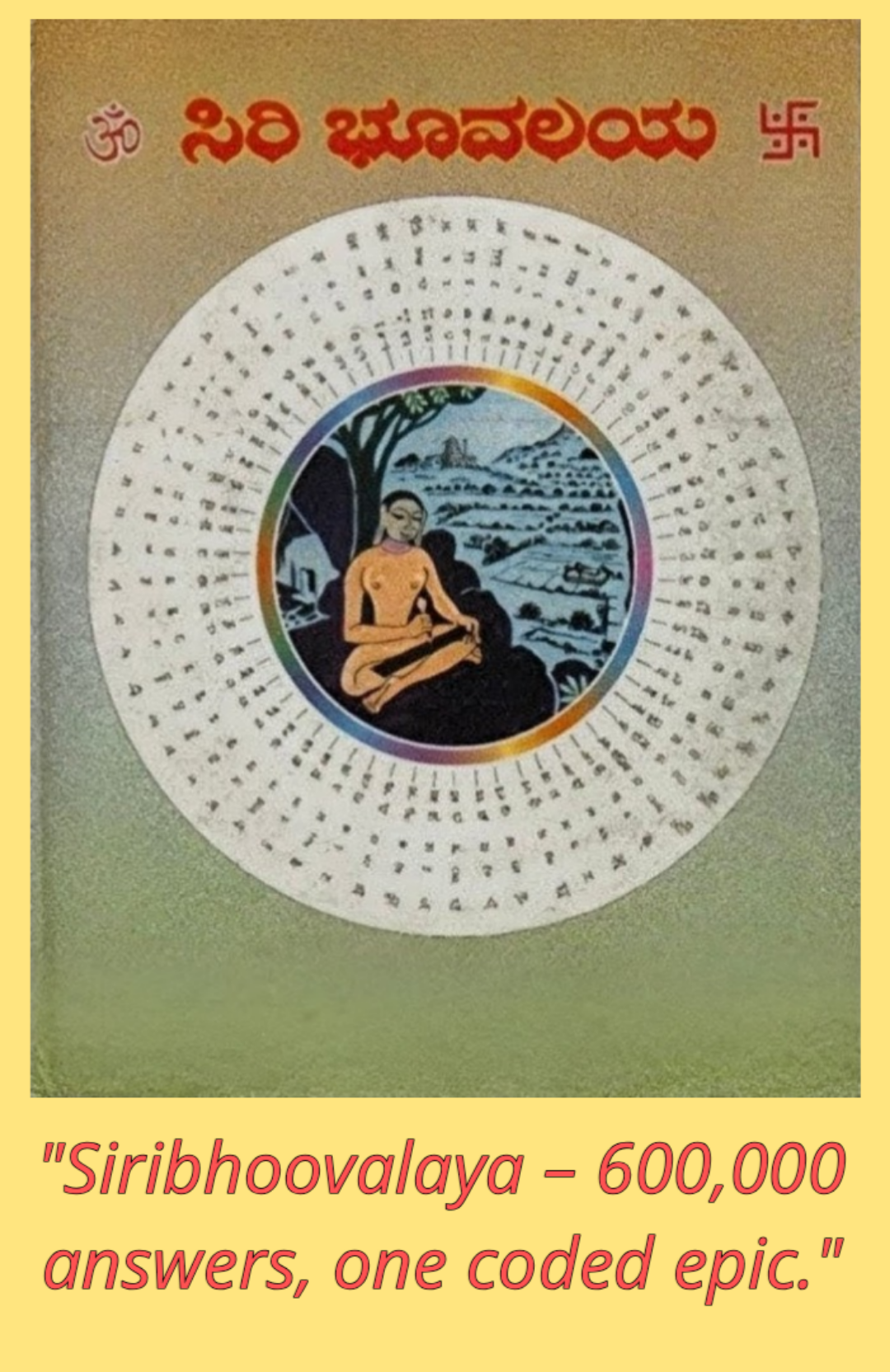
- Kumudendu Munis "Siribhoovalaya"

Information
- Religion: Jainism
- Author: Kumudendu Muni
- Language: Kannada
- Period: 9th century AD
- Chapters: 26
- Verses: 600,000

The Siribhoovalaya (Kannada: ಸಿರಿಭೂವಲಯ) is a Kannada literature written by Kumudendu Muni, a Jain monk. The work is unique in that it employs not letters, but is composed entirely in Kannada numerals. The Saangathya metre of Kannada poetry is employed in the work. It uses numerals 1 through 64 and employs various patterns or bandhas in a frame of 729 (27×27) squares to represent alphabets in nearly 18 scripts and over 700 languages.

== Author ==
The work is attributed to Digambar Jain monk Kumudendu. He claims that he was guru of Rashtrakutas king Amoghavarsha and Ganga king shivamara II and a disciple of Acharya Virasena. However, not much is known about this monk. Scholars are divided about when he lived. Karlamangalam Srikantaiah, the editor of the first edition, claims that the work may have been composed around 800 AD. Dr Venkatachala Sastry, however, dates him and his work to the 15th century. He also claims that Kumudendu Muni belonged to a village called Yalavalli near Nandidurga in Chikkaballapura Taluk in Kolar district. He further dates the work to around the 1550-1600 period and suggests it might be even more recent.

== Description ==
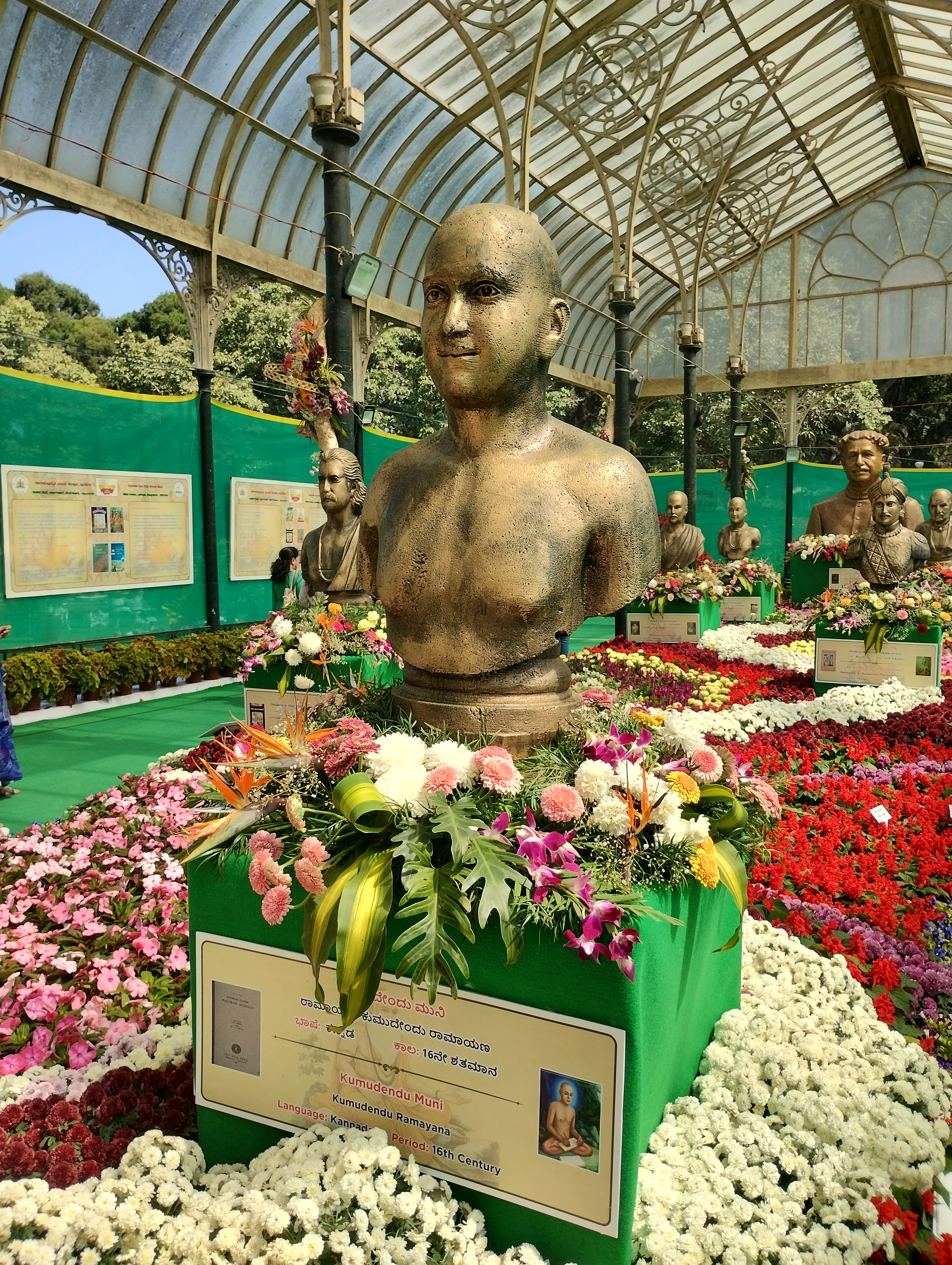
Bust of poet Kumudendu Muni at Lal Bagh, Bangalore, Photographed in January 2025

The work is said to have around 600,000 verses, nearly 6 times as big as the ancient Indian epic Mahabharata. In total, there are 26 chapters constituting a very large volume of text, of which only three have been decoded.

=== Coverage ===
The author expounds on many philosophies which existed in the Jain classics, which are eloquently and skillfully interpreted in the work.

It is also believed to contain valuable information about various sciences including mathematics, chemistry, physics, astronomy, medicine, history, etc. Karlamangalam Srikantaiah, the editor of the first edition, has claimed that the work contains instructions for travel in water and space travel. It is also said that the work contains information about the production of modern weapons.

It is also claimed to consist of works in several languages including Sanskrit, Marathi, Telugu, Tamil, Prakrit, etc., apart from Kannada. Different languages can be realised by assigning different alphabets to different numbers.

=== Codification ===
Some of the patterns used include the Chakrabandha, Hamsabandha, Varapadmabandha, Sagarabandha, Sarasabandha, Kruanchabandha, Mayurabandha, Ramapadabandha, Nakhabandha, etc. As each of these patterns are identified and decoded, the contents can be read.

Though written in Kannada, its numerical encipherment enables speakers of other languages to also comprehend it.

=== Challenges ===
There are 16,000 chakras in all. Out of which only 1,270 chakras are available. There are 9 khandas in all. The available 1,270 chakras belong to Prathama khanda, called Mangala Prabhruta. (This is only a syllabus of the Siri Bhoovalaya, which contains 59 chapters). The remaining 8 khandas of work not available. The number of letters (in the form of numerals) used are 14 lakhs (14,00,000). It has been claimed that it is possible to decipher 6 lakh Shlokas or verses.

Since no contemporary pandit is conversant with the esoteric metres employed in the work, the work of deciphering is being done with the help of computers. The whereabouts of remaining (16,000 - 1,270) = 14,730 chakras are not known.

== Modern reception ==
Yelappa shastri,S. Srikanta Sastri, a respected name in the study of Indian history and culture, has commented on the work thus, This work is of great importance in the study of Kannada language and Literature and the literatures of Sanskrit, Prakritha, Tamil and Telugu. It throws light on the history of India and the history of Karnataka. This is an important source for the study of Indian Mathematics. It is helpful in the study of the development of Physics, Chemistry and the Life Sciences in India. It helps in the study of sculpture and iconography. If the versions of the Jain Ramayana, the Mahabharatha, the and other ancient Jain texts can be decoded, a comparison of those versions with the present day versions would be rewarding. Some Jain works which have been lost may be recovered from this work.
