= D. L. Narasimhachar =

Kannada linguist (b. 1906, d. 1971)

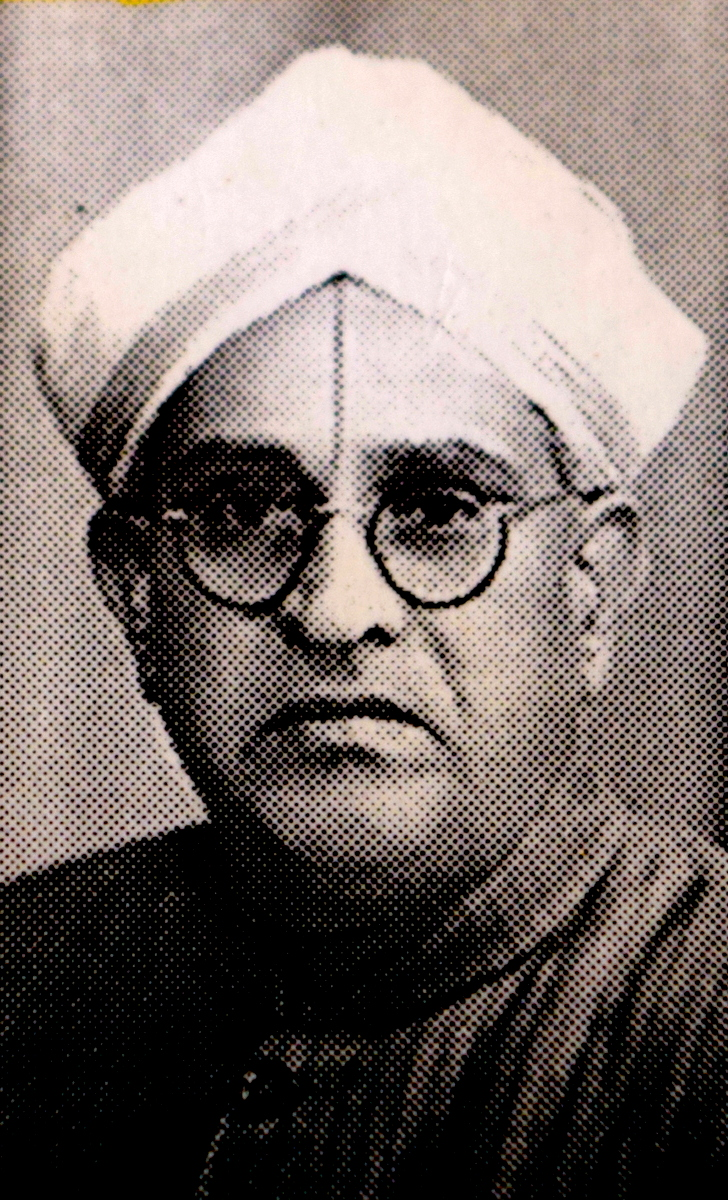
- Born: 27 October 1906; Chikkanayakanahalli, Kingdom of Mysore,
- Died: 7 May 1971 (aged 64); Mysore, Karnataka, India
- Known for: Kannada Grantha Sampadane
- Spouse: Muthumma
- Awards: Kannada Sahitya Parishat Award, Festschrift Volume - "Jnanopasaka" (1960) & "Upayana" (1967)

Academic background
- Education: Maharaja College, Mysore & Central College, Bangalore.
- Academic advisors: B.M. Srikantaiah, T. S. Venkanayya

Academic work
- Discipline: Kannada, Indology, Halegannada, History of Karnataka, Epigraphy
- Institutions: University of Mysore
- Notable students: G. Venkatasubbiah, M. Chidananda Murthy, T. V. Venkatachala Sastry
- Website: D. L. Narasimhachar

Doddabele Lakshmi Narasimhachar (27 October 1906 – 7 May 1971) was a Kannada linguist, grammarian, lexicographer, writer, literary critic and editor who taught at the Department of Kannada Language Studies, University of Mysore between 1932 - 1962. His knowledge of Halegannada (Old Kannada Language) helped him in reading ancient epigraphic records. He authored four books in Kannada, edited about nine volumes, penned eleven prefaces, wrote nearly hundred articles (both in Kannada and English) across three decades, seven monographs in English and outlined introductions to four Kannada works. He presided over the forty first Kannada Sahitya Sammelan (Annual Kannada Language Conference) held at Bidar in 1960. He was the recipient of the Kannada Rajyotsava Award from the Mysore State. In 1969, his alma mater - University of Mysore bestowed on him an Honorary Doctorate (D. Litt) in recognition of a lifetime contribution to the world of Kannada studies.

== Early life and education ==
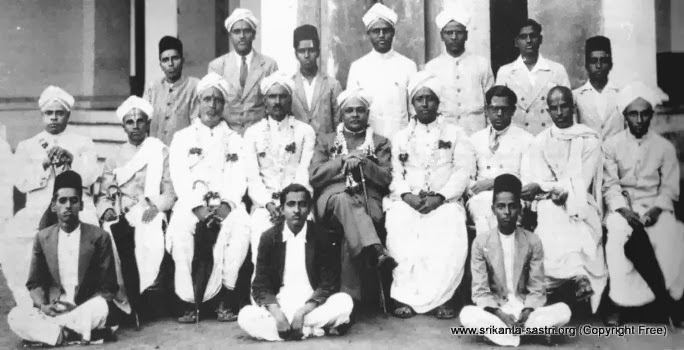
B. A. Honours II Year Maharaja College Group Photo showing B. M. Srikantaiah, S. Srikanta Sastri, D. L. Narasimhachar and G. Venkatasubbiah

D. L. Narasimhachar's younger years were spread out across the district of Tumkur in the southern state of Karnataka - in towns like Pavagada, Madhugiri and Sira. Hailing from a Brahminical family, D. L. N. was trained in chaste Sanskrit from a Pandit. Narasimhachar's writing began at an early stage with recurrent contributions to the local school magazine "School Folk". For his Bachelor's degree (1927), he sought admission to the Central College at Bangalore. There he had taken Kannada as an optional subject (in addition to his primary subjects - Physics and Chemistry). Incidentally, his score in the optional subject was his highest, this eventually steered him to complete his Master's degree in Kannada at the Maharaja College, Mysore (1929). His contemporaries at Maharaja College, Mysore were future literary names like K. V. Puttappa, K. V. Raghavachar, Anantharangachar and K. Venkataramappa. The faculty at Maharaja College, Mysore included B. M. Srikantaiah, Rallapalli Anantha Krishna Sharma, V. Seetharamaiah, C. R. Narasimha Sastry, T. S. Venkannaiah and A. R. Krishna Shastry. During his free time, he would frequent Oriental Research Library to peruse old Kannada manuscripts. The H. V. Nanjundaiah Gold Medal set aside for outstanding Master's student was awarded to D. L. Narasimhachar in 1929.

== Academician ==
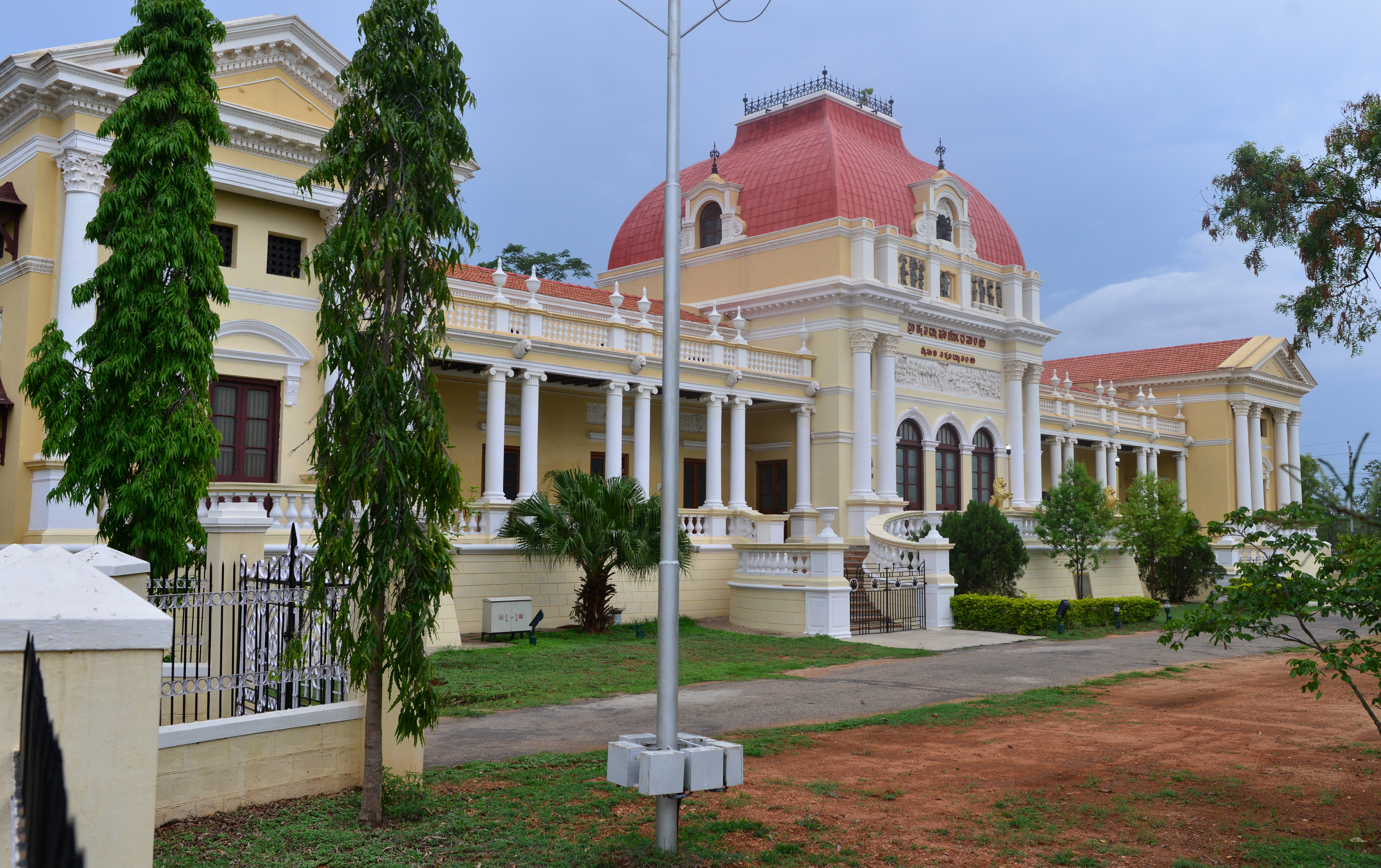
Oriental Research Library, Mysore

D. L. Narasimhachar began his career as a research assistant at the Oriental Research Library, Mysore. He simultaneously held the position of a part-time lecturer in Kannada at the Maharaja College Kannada Department. An ongoing research project dedicated to the 'timing' of the earliest Veerashaiva literature caught his attention. He became the first recipient of the research grant set aside for this scholarly endeavour. After his departure from the Oriental Research Library, he was appointed a full time lecturer at the college in 1932 and continued in the same post till 1939. For a brief tenure of two years, he taught at present-day Yuvaraja College, Mysore before coming back to his parent department, where he taught till the end of the Second World War.

In late 1945, he received a promotion to the post of Assistant Professor and was transferred to Central College, Bangalore. By the end of the decade, he was back in Mysore as Associate Professor in the department where he started his career. In 1954, he was appointed Chief Editor of the ‘Kannada-Kannada’ Dictionary Project . D. L. Narasimhachar spent the remainder of his years till retirement in 1962 serving at Mysore in the capacity of Professor of Kannada Language Studies. His career spanned thirty years from 1932 - 1962.

The University Grants Commission (U. G. C.) extended a Post-Doctoral Fellowship to D. L. N. from 1962 onwards for the next six years.

== Literary contributions ==
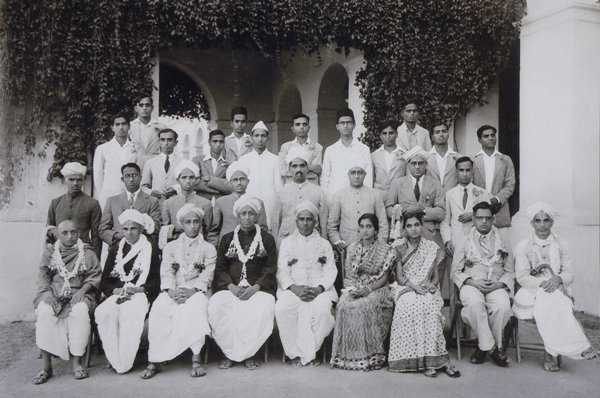
Maharaja's College Faculty:Sitting row-left to right M. H. Krishna (third from left), A. R. Krishna Sastry (fourth from left), S. Srikanta sastri (seventh from left), Rallapalli Anantha Krishna Sharma (eighth from left), Standing-bottom row-V. Seetharamaiah (fourth from left) and D. L. Narasimhachar (seventh from left)

D. L. Narasimhachar's scholarship was along two lines - "Textual Criticism" and "Independent Research". His involvement in the "Kannada - Kannada' Dictionary project saw him bring out the first edition of the dictionary during those years. He succeeded T. N. Srikantaiah in this project after his demise. D. L. N.'s guide to Editorship titled "Kannada Grantha Sampadane" is among his remembered works. Between 1959 - 63, he was the Editor of the University of Mysore's Journal "Prabuddha Karnataka". His introductions to K. S. Narasimha Swamy's "Shilalathe", "Vaddaradhane", "Pampa Ramayana Sangraha" and "Sukumara Charitam" brought him much note. Narasimhachar was involved in Epigraphical Studies across the state. His knowledge of Halegannada helped him decipher much of these inscriptions. He delivered numerous lectures on the Mysore Akashvani (later All India Radio). His publication titled "Pīṭhikegaḷu, lēkhanagaḷu" was a compendium of his earlier essays and lectures spanning three decades.

=== Selected works ===
==== Books ====
- Narasimhachar, D. L.: "Hampeya Harihara" (1939)
- Narasimhachar, D. L.: "Shabda Vihara" (1956)
- Narasimhachar, D. L.: "Śivakōtyācārya viracita Vaḍḍārādhane" (1959)
- Narasimhachar, D. L.: "Kannada Grantha Sampadane" (1964)
- Narasimhachar, D. L.: "Gōvina hāḍu" (1967)
- Narasimhachar, D. L.: "Peetekagalu-Lekhanagalu" (1971)
- Narasimhachar, D. L.: "Pampa Bharata Dipike" (1971)

==== Editorship ====
- Narasimhachar, D. L.: "Bhīṣmaparva saṅgraha" (1930)
- Narasimhachar, D. L.: "Pampa Ramayana Sangraha"
- Narasimhachar, D. L.: "Siddarama Charithra" (1941)
- Narasimhachar, D. L.: "Karnāṭaka Mahābhārata. Bhīṣma parva" (1950)
- Narasimhachar, D. L.: "Siddarama Charitheya Sangraha" (1962)
- Narasimhachar, D. L.: "Rāghavāṅka kaviya Siddharāma cāritra" (1975)
- Narasimhachar, D. L.: "Sukumara Charitam" (1954)
- Narasimhachar, D. L.: "Shabdamanidarpanam" (1964)
- Narasimhachar, D. L.: "Kēśirāja viracita Śabdamaṇidarpaṇaṃ" (1964)
- Narasimhachar, D. L.: "Kannaḍa Sāhitya Pariṣattina Kannaḍa nighaṇṭu" (1971 - 1990)

==== Forewords ====
- Narasimhachar, D. L.: "Kannadadalli Vidambana Sahitya" (1947)
- Narasimhachar, D. L.: "Kannadadalli Vidambana Sahitya" (1947)
- Narasimhachar, D. L.: "Toogudevege" (1963)
- Narasimhachar, D. L.: "Basava Sthothra Geethe" (1954)
- Narasimhachar, D. L.: "Vyavahara Kannada" (1956)
- Narasimhachar, D. L.: "Shilalathe" (1958)

==== Essays ====
- Narasimhachar, D. L.: "Indina Kannada Kavithe" (1943)
- Narasimhachar, D. L.: "Kumaravyasana Karna" (1958)
- Narasimhachar, D. L.: "Ranna Kaviya Sahashra Varshikothsava"
- Narasimhachar, D. L.: "Vijayanagara Kalada Sahitya"
- Narasimhachar, D. L.: "Gadayuddha: Ondu Padyada Arthavichara" (1967)
- Narasimhachar, D. L.: "Nighantu Rachane"
- Narasimhachar, D. L.: "Granthasampadane" (1971)

==== English works ====
- Narasimhachar, D. L.: “Social & Religious life in Karnataka under the Satavahanas”
- Narasimhachar, D. L.: “The Genealogy of Arikesarin II–Vol 7”
- Narasimhachar, D. L.: “Four Etymos from Old Kannada” (Emeneau Presentation)

== Recognition ==
D. L. Narasimhachar authored number of books and essays across three decades. Some of his notable students include - G. Venkatasubbiah and T. V. Venkatachala Sastry. The Kannada Sahitya Parishat conferred on him Sahitya Akademi Award. He presided over the forty first instalment of their annual congregation held at Bidar in 1960. Two Festschrift Volumes were dedicated by contemporary scholars titled “Jnanopasaka” (1960) and “Upayana” (1967). A commemoration volume was brought forth in 2005 by Hampi University titled "ಡಿ. ಎಲ್. ನರಸಿಂಹಾಚಾರ್ ಶತಮಾನ ಸ್ಮರಣೆ". His student and Kannada litterateur T. V. Venkatachala Sastry authored a memoir on his former teacher and mentor titled "ಪ್ರೊಫೆಸರ್ ಡಿ. ಎಲ್. ನರಸಿಂಹಾಚಾರ್ಯರ ಹೆಚ್ಚಿನ ಬರಹಗಳು" in 2008. The Government of Mysore awarded the Kannada Rajyotsava Award. In recognition of a lifetime dedicated to the world of Kannada studies, his alma mater - University of Mysore bestowed on him an honorary D. Litt in 1969. Following his retirement in 1962, he was appointed (University Grants Commission) U. G. C. Research Fellow for the next six years. He died on 7 May 1971 at the age of 65 years.

== Bibliography ==
- "The Jaina Ramayana" - Indian Historical Quarterly (1939)
- "Śabda-Vihāra: Kannaḍakavi-kāvyamāle 36." by Upadhye, A. N. (1957): 317-318.
- "Kharatara-Bṛhadgurvāvali: Singhi Jaina Granthamālā, No. 42." by Upadhye, A. N. (1957): 317-317.
- "Reviewed Work: History of Jaina Monachism : (from Inscriptions and Literature)" by A. N. Upadhye (1957); Annals of the Bhandarkar Oriental Research Institute Vol. 38, No. 3/4 (July-October 1957), pp. 315-317
- "A Middle Indo-Aryan Reader" Review by A. N. Upadhye (1957); Annals of the Bhandarkar Oriental Research Institute
- "Sukumāra-Caritaṁ: of Śāntinātha Kavi" Review by T. S. Shama Rao (1957); Annals of the Bhandarkar Oriental Research Institute
- "Kannada Verb Morphology: Vaḍḍa:ra:dhane" by D. N. Shankara Bhat (1963); Bulletin of the Deccan College Research Institute
- "Epigraphical Notes: Katavapra and Nayanadeva" by B. R. Gopal (1973); Proceedings of the Indian History Congress
- "Vaddaradhane: A Study; Research Publications Series: 38." (1980) by Laddu, S. D.; pp 304-305, JSTOR
- "Religion and society in Southern Karnataka in the early medieval period." by Bhat, Malini U. (1995); ir.inflibnet.ac.in
- Ripepi, Tiziana. "On Maritohtadarya and other Tohtadaryas: Who is the author of Kaivalyasara ? An attribution problem concerning a Virasaiava text in Sanskrit." Rivista degli studi orientali 71.Fasc. 1/4 (1997): 169-183.
- "From Norm-bound Practice to Practice-bound Norm in Kannada Intellectual History." South-Indian Horizons: Felicitation Volume for Francois Gros on the Occasion of His 70th Birthday by Pollock, Sheldon. (2004): 389.
- Dehuri, Rajendra. "Narrative Art on Dhobi Math Mandir Wall at Nabratnagarh, Sesai, Distt-Gumla, Jharkhand." (2013)
- "Agraharas in Dharwad District KEYWORDS: Agraharas-Meaning" by K. C. Santhosh Kumar (2014); History 3.9
- "Bijholi Rock Inscription of Cahamana Somadeva." Women and Society in Early Medieval India: Re-interpreting Epigraphs. by Verma, Anjali, et al. (2019); Vol. 3. No. 1st. New Delhi: Orient Books reprint Corporation. ix-xii.
