= G. Venkatasubbiah =

Kannada writer, grammarian, editor, lexicographer, and critic (1913–2021)

Ganjam Venkatasubbiah
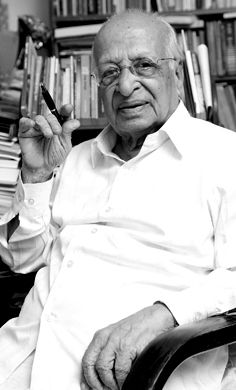
- Born: 23 August 1913; Ganjam, Srirangapatna, Kingdom of Mysore, British Raj
- Died: 19 April 2021 (aged 107); Bangalore, Karnataka, India
- Occupations: Writer, researcher, teacher
- Spouse: Lakshmi
- Writing career
- Period: 20th century
- Subjects: Lexicography, Kannada Grammar, Editorship
- Notable awards: Padma Shri; Sahitya Akademi Award; Pampa Award
- Website: G. Venkatasubbiah

Ganjam Venkatasubbiah (23 August 1913 – 19 April 2021), also known as G. V., was a Kannada writer, grammarian, editor, lexicographer, and critic who compiled over eight dictionaries, authored four seminal works on dictionary science in Kannada, edited over sixty books, and published several papers. Recipient of the Kannada Sahitya Akademi Award and the Pampa Award, Venkatasubbiah's contribution to the world of Kannada Lexicography is vast. His work Igo Kannada is a socio-linguistic dictionary which encompasses an eclectic mix of Kannada phrases, usages, idioms, and serves as a reference for linguists and sociologists alike.

Venkatasubbiah is best known for his work on Kannada dictionary science titled Kannada Nighantu Shastra Parichaya. This came out exactly one hundred years after a Kannada-English dictionary was authored by the German priest and Indologist Reverend Ferdinand Kittel in 1894. This work became an addition to a tradition of dictionary writing in Kannada known for at least thousand years starting with first available Rannakanda.

== Early life and education ==
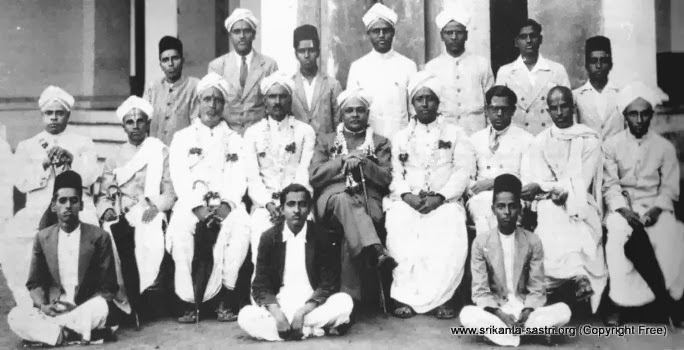
B. A. Honours II Year Maharaja College Group Photo showing B. M. Srikantaiah, S. Srikanta Sastri and G. Venkatasubbiah

Venkatasubbiah was born on 23 August 1913. His father Ganjam Thimmanniah was a renowned Kannada and Sanskrit scholar. He was instrumental in inspiring in Venkatasubbiah a love for old Kannada. His primary schooling was spread out across the towns of Bannur and Madhugiri in the south Indian state of Karnataka. The second child in a family of eight, Venkatasubbiah had to follow his father from town to town as he frequently kept getting transferred in his Government job. By the early 1930s, Venkatasubbiah's family relocated to city of Mysore where he joined Yuvaraja college for his intermediate course where he came under the influence of K. V. Puttappa (Kuvempu). Venkatasubbiah then joined the Maharaja College at Mysore to pursue his Bachelor of Arts (Honours) degree. His chosen subjects included Ancient History, Sanskrit and old Kannada among others. Here he came under the tutelage of T. S. Venkannayya who taught Pampa Bharata, D. L. Narasimhachar who taught Editorial Science, T. N. Srikantaiah who taught Kavyamimamse and S. Srikanta Sastri who taught Karnataka History. Venkatasubbiah completed his M. A. between 1936–38 and was recipient of the University Gold Medal.

== Academician ==
Venkatasubbiah taught English at Municipal High School, Mandya and Bangalore High School, Bangalore before joining Vijaya College as faculty in the Kannada department. During these years, Venkatasubbiah inspired his friend and colleague Ramachandra Sharma to publish his collection of Kannada poetry in a book form. This was brought out under the title of Hrudayageethe with a preface by Gopalakrishna Adiga and S. R. Ekkundi. At Vijaya College, he is remembered for starting the student magazine Utsaha. He served at that college as a Lecturer, Professor and Principal before retiring. He was actively involved in the Mysore University Academic Council and Private College Teachers' Association during these years.

== Literary contributions ==
Venkatasubbiah has compiled more than 10 dictionaries, including an eight-volume Kannada-Kannada Nighantu (Dictionary). This dictionary has also been translated to the Braille language by the Braille Transcription Centre of the Canara Bank Relief and Welfare Society. He has been writing the column, Igo Kannada for over a decade in the Kannada daily Prajavani. The articles published in Igo Kannada have been compiled into a book in four volumes. It is a social dictionary which encompasses an eclectic mix of Kannada phrases, usages, idioms and phrases. He has also authored a dictionary entitled Klishtapada Kosha (a dictionary of complex Kannada words) which was released to mark the Suvarna Karnataka (Silver Jubilee of the formation of Karnataka). It is the first of its kind in Kannada language which covers different language specifications such as derivation, punctuation, phoneme and morphological patterns of Kannada language as the language has evolved over the centuries.

Venkatasubbaiah is remembered for his work on Kannada dictionary science titled Kannada Nighantu Shastra Parichaya which came out exactly one hundred years after the first Kannada dictionary was authored by the German priest and Indologist Reverend Ferdinand Kittel in 1894. Between 1964 - 1969, while at the Kannada Sahitya Parishat (Kannada Literary Centre), he had the distinction of being its youngest president. As President, he was instrumental in increasing the society's financial grants from the Government. He was chief editor of the 'Kannada - Kannada Dictionary' project. He was involved in Kannada Encyclopaedia Project, Sahitya Sammelana (Literary Fest) at Karwar and Shravanabelagola and as the Editor of Kannada Sahitya Parishat's monthly magazine Kannada Nudi. He has served as the vice-president of the Lexicographical Association of India for 17 years. In 1998, he was appointed an advisor to the multilingual dictionary project of the Institute of Asian Studies, Chennai, which comprises Japanese, Kannada, English and Tamil. He was also appointed a consultative committee member in the Telugu lexicon project initiated by the Telugu Academy of the Government of Andhra Pradesh. He was the First President of Bidar District 1st Kannada Sahitya Sammelana (Kannada Literary Festival) held in the year 1974. He was honoured with the Presidency of 77th Akhila Bharata Kannada Sahitya Sammelana (All India Kannada Literary Meet) held at Bangalore on 2011.

=== Lexicography ===
- G. Venkatasubbiah (1975) - Kannada – Kannada Concise Dictionary
- G. Venkatasubbiah (1981) – Kannada – Kannada – English Dictionary
- G. Venkatasubbiah (1993) – Kannada Nighantu Shastra Parichaya
- G. Venkatasubbiah (1996) – Muddanna Padaprayoga Kosha
- G. Venkatasubbiah (1998) – Patrika Padakosha
- G. Venkatasubbiah (1998) – Eravalu Padakosha (Borrowed words in Kannada)
- G. Venkatasubbiah (1996 - 2013) – Igo Kannada (1) – Sociolinguistic Dictionary
- G. Venkatasubbiah (2001 – 2013) – Igo Kannada (2) – Sociolinguistic Dictionary
- G. Venkatasubbiah (2009 – 2013) – Igo Kannada (3) – Sociolinguistic Dictionary
- G. Venkatasubbiah (2001) – Prof G. V.’s Prism English – Kannada Dictionary
- G. Venkatasubbiah (2003) – Kannada Nighantu Parivara
- G. Venkatasubbiah (2006) – Kannada Klishtapada Kosha
- G. Venkatasubbiah (2010) – Shabda mathu artha
- G. Venkatasubbiah (2012) – Kannada Lexicography and other articles

=== Literary criticism and history of Kannada literature ===
- G. Venkatasubbiah (1942) – Nayasena
- G. Venkatasubbiah (1952) – College Translation
- G. Venkatasubbiah (1954) – Translations Lessons (1)
- G. Venkatasubbiah (1954) – Translations Lessons (2)
- G. Venkatasubbiah (1954) – Translations Lessons (3)
- G. Venkatasubbiah (1957) – Anukalpane
- G. Venkatasubbiah (1968) – Kannada Shashana Parichaya
- G. Venkatasubbiah (1978) – Kannada Sahitya Nadedubanda Dari
- G. Venkatasubbiah (1986) – Prof. T. S. Venkannayya
- G. Venkatasubbiah (1996) – D. V. Gundappa
- G. Venkatasubbiah (1999) - Kannaḍavannu Uḷisidavaru
- G. Venkatasubbiah (1999) – Kannadavannu Ulisi Belisidavaru
- G. Venkatasubbiah (2000) – Sahitya mathu Shikshana
- G. Venkatasubbiah (2000) – Kannadada Nayakamanigalu
- G. Venkatasubbiah (2002) – Inuku Nota
- G. Venkatasubbiah (2003) – Karnataka Vaibhava
- G. Venkatasubbiah (2003) – Paramarshana
- G. Venkatasubbiah (2003) – Kavya Chinthana
- G. Venkatasubbiah (2003) – Seelunota
- G. Venkatasubbiah (2006) – Margadarshakaru
- G. Venkatasubbiah (2007) – Gatiprajne
- G. Venkatasubbiah (2008) – Samaya Sandarbha Sannivesha
- G. Venkatasubbiah (2010) – Kumaravyasana antaranga – Yudha Panchakadalli
- G. Venkatasubbiah (2011) – Sarigannada Sarasvaturu
- G. Venkatasubbiah (2011) – Kavya Chinthana mathu Jivana Manthana
- G. Venkatasubbiah (2011) – G. V. Vichara Vihara
- G. Venkatasubbiah (2011) – Ondishtu Ramayana Ondishtu Mahabharata
- G. Venkatasubbiah (2013) – Purana Kathavaliya Ganjam Thimmannayya

=== Editorial work ===
- G. Venkatasubbiah (1964) – Kannada Rathna Parichaya
- G. Venkatasubbiah (1966) – Nalachampu Sangraha
- G. Venkatasubbiah (1966) – Akrura Charithreya Sangraha
- G. Venkatasubbiah (1966) – Karna Karnamruta
- G. Venkatasubbiah (1968) – Kavya Lahiri
- G. Venkatasubbiah (1970) – Kavya Samputa
- G. Venkatasubbiah (1987) – Muddanna Bhandara, Part 1
- G. Venkatasubbiah (1987) – Muddanna Bhandara, Part 2
- G. Venkatasubbiah (1991) – Tamilu Kathegalu
- G. Venkatasubbiah (1991) – Telugu Kathegalu
- G. Venkatasubbiah (1991) – Malayalam Kathegalu
- G. Venkatasubbiah (1991) – Kannada Kathegalu
- G. Venkatasubbiah (1993) – Iruvatu Kannada Cherukathakal (Malayalam)
- G. Venkatasubbiah (1996) – Kannada Kathanikala Sankalanam (Telugu)
- G. Venkatasubbiah (1996) – Ratnakaravarni
- G. Venkatasubbiah (1996) – Sri Rama Sambhava
- G. Venkatasubbiah (2007) – Baligondu Belaku, Ramayanada Drishti
- G. Venkatasubbiah (2007) – Karnatakada Ekikaranada Anubhavagalu
- G. Venkatasubbiah (2008) – Barthruhari Virachitha Vakyapadiyada Sadhana Samudhesha
- G. Venkatasubbiah (2008) – Hoysala Karnataka Rajyothsava Samputa
- G. Venkatasubbiah (2010) – Samskruta Ramayana Natakagallali Patra Vaividhya
- G. Venkatasubbiah (2011) – Nagarasana Karnataka Bagavadgeethe
- G. Venkatasubbiah (2012) – Ramayanada Antaranga
- G. Venkatasubbiah (2008-15) – Hoysala Male (series)

=== Translations ===
- G. Venkatasubbiah (1964) – Lindon Johnson Kathe
- G. Venkatasubbiah (1965) – Samyuktha Samsthanagallanu Parichaya Madikolli
- G. Venkatasubbiah (1972) – Śaṅkarācārya (original by T M P Mahadevan)
- G. Venkatasubbiah (1974) – Kabir
- G. Venkatasubbiah (1985) – Saraladasa
- G. Venkatasubbiah (1980-82) – Idu Namma Bharata
- G. Venkatasubbiah (2005) – Beyond the Known
- G. Venkatasubbiah (2007) – Muddannana Mooru Ramayanagalu

=== Children's books ===
- G. Venkatasubbiah (1967) – Robinson Crusoe
- G. Venkatasubbiah (1972) – Kavi Janna
- G. Venkatasubbiah (1975) – Chavundaraya
- G. Venkatasubbiah (2011) – Chinnara Chitra Ramayana

== Late life and recognition ==
Numerous felicitation volumes have been brought forth in honour of Venkatasubbiah's contribution to the world of Kannada literature and lexicography. In addition to these, various awards have been bestowed upon him. On his 60th birthday, a felicitation volume titled Sahityajeevi was presented to him. Similarly, in his ninetieth year, Shabdasagara was brought forth. In 2011, he was presented with a felicitation volume Vidvajeevita which was a collection of articles authored by writers from South Canara region of Karnataka and edited by Dr. Padekallu Vishnubhatta. To mark his centenary, another felicitation volume titled Shatanamana was presented to him at a gala function at Bangalore. Venkatasubbiah at the age of 102 years was the presiding guest of honour at the book launch of Srikanthayana - collection of writings in English on subjects related to History, Indology and Archaeology by his teacher S. Srikanta Sastri in 2016.

=== List of awards ===
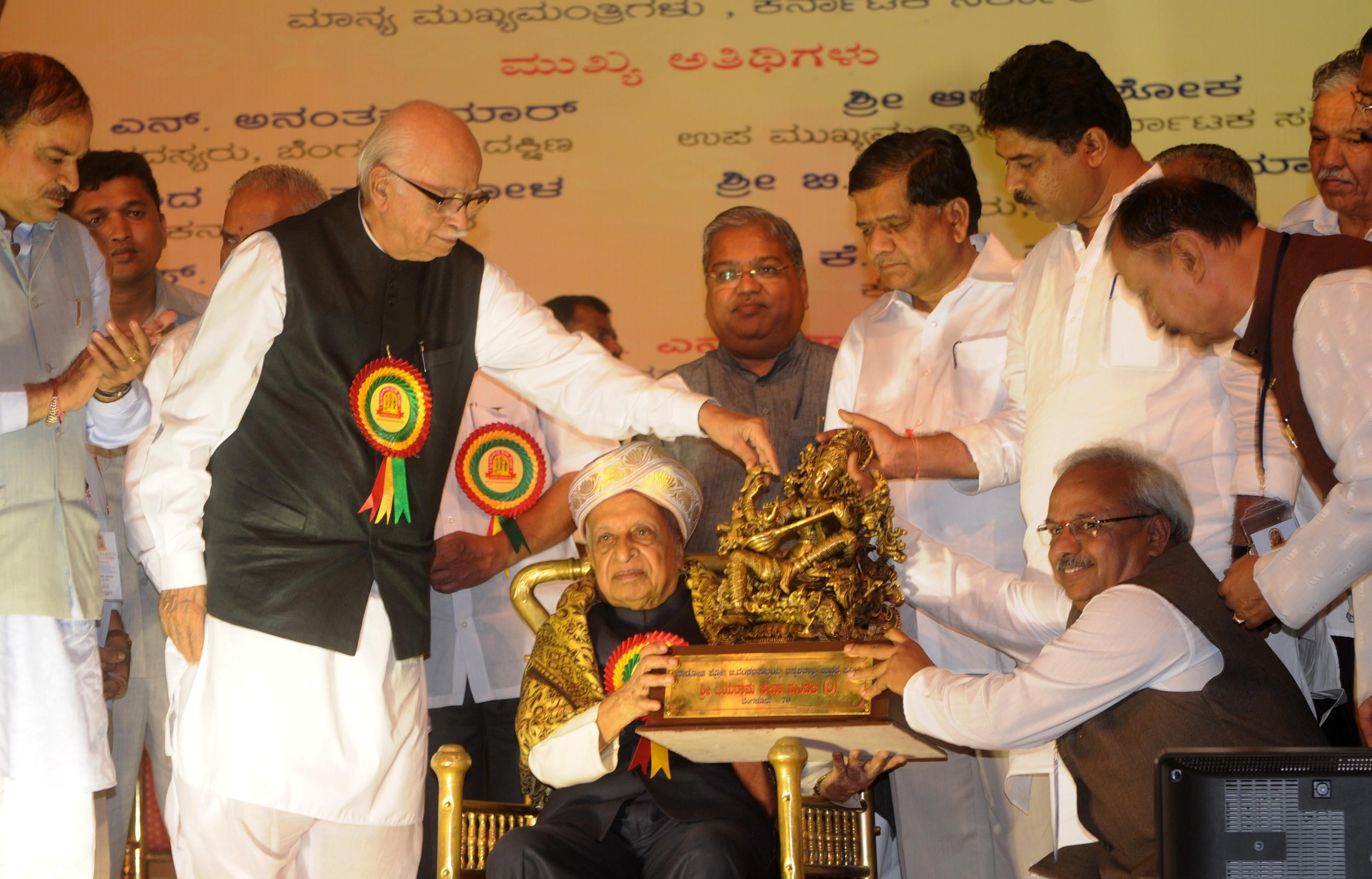
G. Venkatasubbiah being felicitated by L. K. Advani at Bangalore - 2012

- Vidyalankara – from Charukeerthi Bhattaraka Swamiji
- Karnataka Sahitya Academy Award
- Rajyotsava Award
- Karnataka Sahitya Academy Honorary Award
- Karnataka Ekikarana Prashasthi
- Shamba Prashasthi
- Sediyapu Prashasthi
- Shivaram Karanth Award
- Press Academy Special Award
- Aryabhata Award
- Maasti Award
- Gorur Award
- Srikrishna Award
- Aa Na Kru Prashasthi
- Alvas Nudisiri
- Thalthaja Keshavabhattara Smaranartha Keshava Prashasthi
- Gokak Prashasthi
- Sri Vanamali Seva Prashasthi
- K. M. Munshi Award
- Rotary Pioneer Extraordinary Award
- Cited at the "First International Lexicographers Meeting" held at the Annamalai University in Tamil Nadu.
- Paul Harris Fellowship
- Nadoja Award – Hampi University (D.Litt.)
- Honorary Doctorate from Rani Chennamma University
- 77 All India Kannada Sahitya Sammelana Presidency
- Pampa Award
- President of India – Oldest Living Achiever and Alumni Honour – University of Mysore Centenary Celebration.
- Padmashri – 2017
- Lipyantara - 2010 by Dharmasthala Manjunatha Dharmothana Trust

== Death ==
Prof. G Venkatasubbaiah died on 19 April 2021 in Bangalore. He was 107.

== Bibliography ==
- Śēṣanārāyaṇa (1976). Felicitation Volume: 'ಚಿರಂಜೀವಿ' ಪ್ರೊ।। ಜಿ. ವೆಂಕಟಸುಬ್ಬಯ್ಯ ಸ್ಮರನಾರ್ಥಕ (1st ed.) Bangalore. publishers: Prō. Ji. Veṅkaṭasubbayya Smaraṇa Samiti
- Veṅkaṭēś, Mallēpuraṃ G. (2004). Felicitation Volume: 'ಶಬ್ಧಸಾಗರಾ': ಜಿ. ವೆಂಕಟಸುಬ್ಬಯ್ಯ ನುಡಿಗೌರವ (1st ed.) Bangalore. publishers: ಸುಂದರ ಪ್ರಕಾಶನ.
- Venkatasubbiah, G. V. (2013). ಪುರಾಣ ಕಥಾವಳಿಯ ಪ೦ಡಿತ ಜಿ. ತಿಮ್ಮಣ್ಣಯ್ಯನವರು (1st ed.) Bangalore. publishers: ಹೊಯ್ಸಳ ಸಂಪಾದಕ ಮ೦ಡಲಿ.pp. 1–56
- Bhatta, Padekallu Vishnu (2011). Felicitation Volume: 'ವಿದ್ವತ್ತ್ ಜೀವಿತ' ಪ್ರೊ।। ಜಿ. ವೆಂಕಟಸುಬ್ಬಯ್ಯ ಗೌರವಗ್ರಂಥ (1st ed.) Udupi. publishers: Rāṣṭrakavi Gōvinda Pai Saṃśōdhana Kēndra. ISBN 8186668691
- Krishna Bhat, C. (2011). Article: ಸಮಯ ಸಂಧರ್ಬ ಸನ್ನಿವೇಶ (1st ed.) Udupi. pp. 3–10.
- Rao, Mahabaleshwar. (2011) ಸಂಪ್ರದಾಯದ ಜಾಡಿನಲ್ಲಿ 'ಸಾಹಿತ್ಯ ಮತ್ತು ಶಿಕ್ಷನ' (1st ed.) pp. 17–21.
- Someshwara, Amrutha. Article: ಕುಮಾರವ್ಯಾಸನ ಅಂತರಂಗ - ಯುದ್ಧಪಂಚಕದಲ್ಲಿ ಕೆಲವು ಅನಿಸಿಕೆಗಳು (2nd ed.) Udupi. pp. 11–17.
- Narayan, P. V. (2012). Felicitation Volume: 'ಶತಾನಮನ' ಪ್ರೊ।। ಜಿ. ವೆಂಕಟಸುಬ್ಬಯ್ಯ ಸಂಭಾವನ ಸಂಪುಟ (1st ed.) Bangalore. publishers: Nāḍōja Prō. Ji. Veṅkaṭasubbayya Janmaśatābdi Svāgata Samiti.
- Aruna, G. V. (2013). ಕನ್ನಡದ ಅರ್ಥವನ್ನು ತಿಳಿಸಿದ ನಾಡೋಜ ಪ್ರೊ. ಜಿ. ವೆಂಕಟಸುಬ್ಬಯ್ಯ (1st ed.) Bangalore. publishers: ಹೊಯ್ಸಳ ಸಂಪಾದಕ ಮ೦ಡಲಿ.pp. 1–64
