= Srikantaiah =

Srikantaiah is an Indian surname. Notable people with the surname include:

- B. M. Srikantaiah (1884–1946), Indian poet, author, writer, professor, and translator of Kannada literature
- T. N. Srikantaiah (1906–1966), Kannada literary poet, linguist, and teacher
