= Maharaja's College, Mysore =

College of Mysore University

Coordinates: 12.305339°N 76.640823°E

Maharaja's College, Mysuru
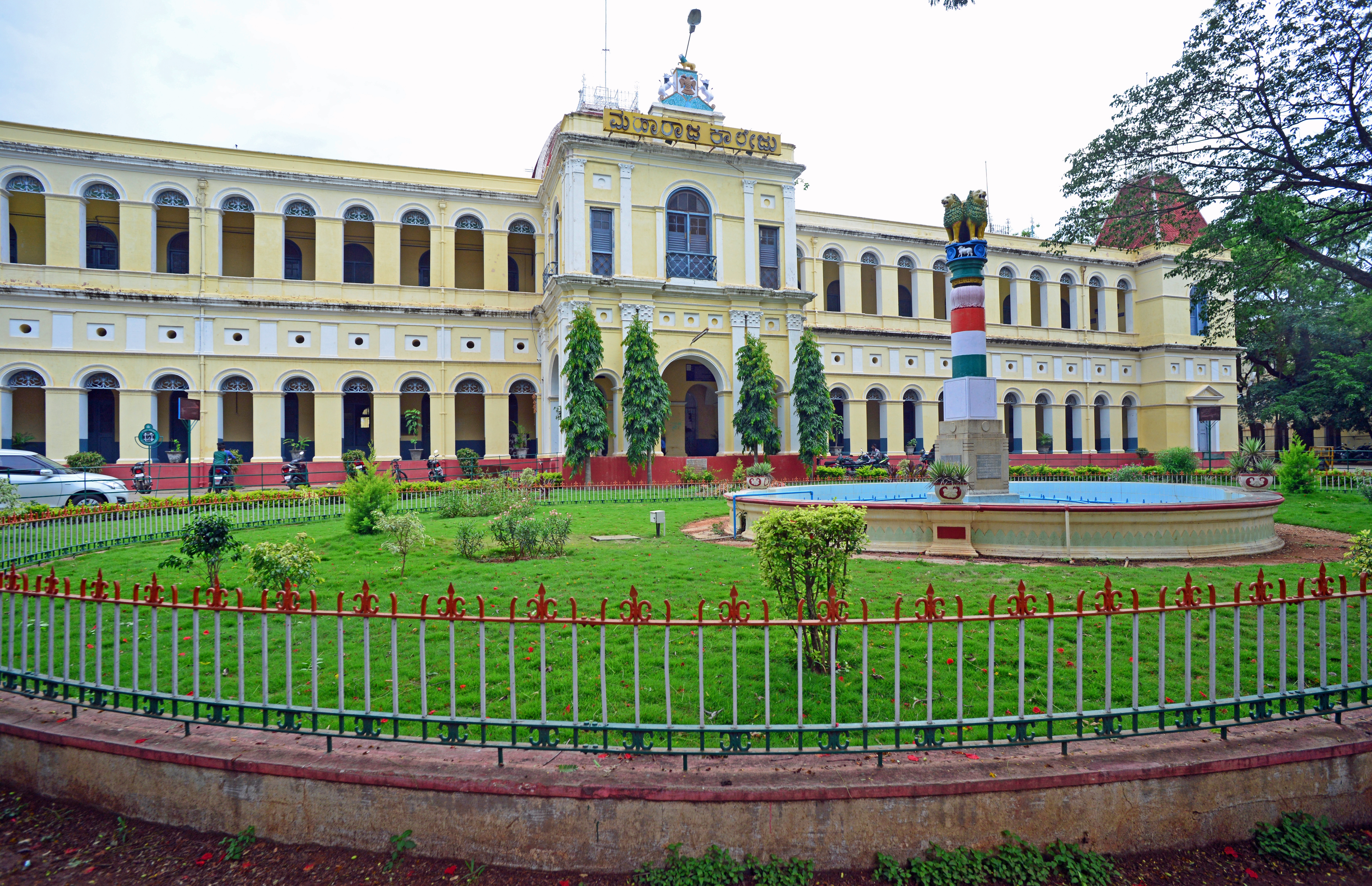
- Motto: Manushya Jati Tanonde Valam
- Type: Government Educational Institution
- Established: 1889; 137 years ago
- Affiliations: University of Mysore
- Principal: Prof.B.Nagarajamurthy
- Location: Mysuru, Karnataka, India
- Nickname: MCM
- Website: maharajas.uni-mysore.ac.in

Maharaja's College, Mysuru (1889) constituent college to University of Mysore.

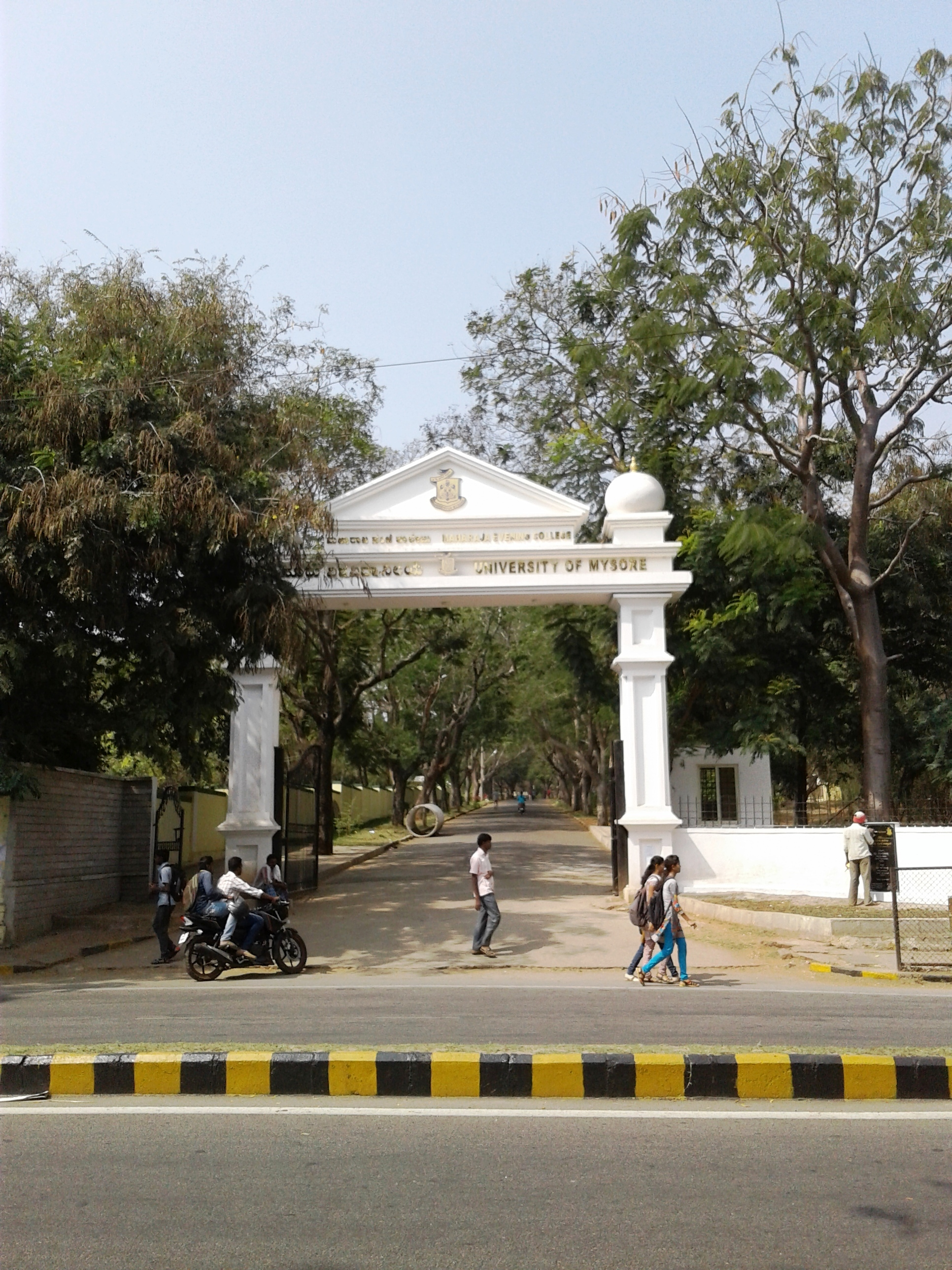
Maharaja's College main gate

== History ==
The college finds its origins in the English-school known as "Maharaja Patashala" established by Maharaja of Mysore, Krishnaraja Wadiyar III in 1833, at the request of a British officer, General Fraser. Subsequently, it became a High School, and in 1868, after the death of Maharaja was handed over to the Government of Mysore. The foundation stone of the present building was laid by Prince Albert Victor of Wales during his tour of India on 27 November 1889 in Mysore, during the reign Chamarajendra Wadiyar X. In 1879, the college was upgraded and became affiliated with University of Madras, it was upgraded to the first grade college in 1894.

The building was constructed at a cost of Rs 9.41 lakh at the time, The architecture was highlighted by arcaded verandahs on two floors, a central mansard roof and projecting end-blocks. It alsoemployed ornate elements like impost mouldings and pilastered capitals. Nearly four decades later, the building of Yuvaraja's College, constructed near by in 1927 was modelled on the Maharaja's college building.

The college took its present shape when the University of Mysore was established in 1916. The university started functioning from college campus itself and VC's office remained here till 1947 when Crawford Hall was built. M.A. courses were started at the college in 1917. It went on to be a pioneer in the education. The college has had distinguished teachers such as Prof. JC Rollo, Albert Mackintosh, Kuvempu, Shama Rao, K. Hanumanta Rao, and Dr. Sarvepalli Radhakrishnan (1918-1921) besides notable alumni like writer R.K. Narayan.

As of July 2013, the University of Mysore was accredited "Grade A" by National Assessment and Accreditation Council (NAAC), while its academic staff was ranked amongst the top 5 in across India.

== Former faculty ==
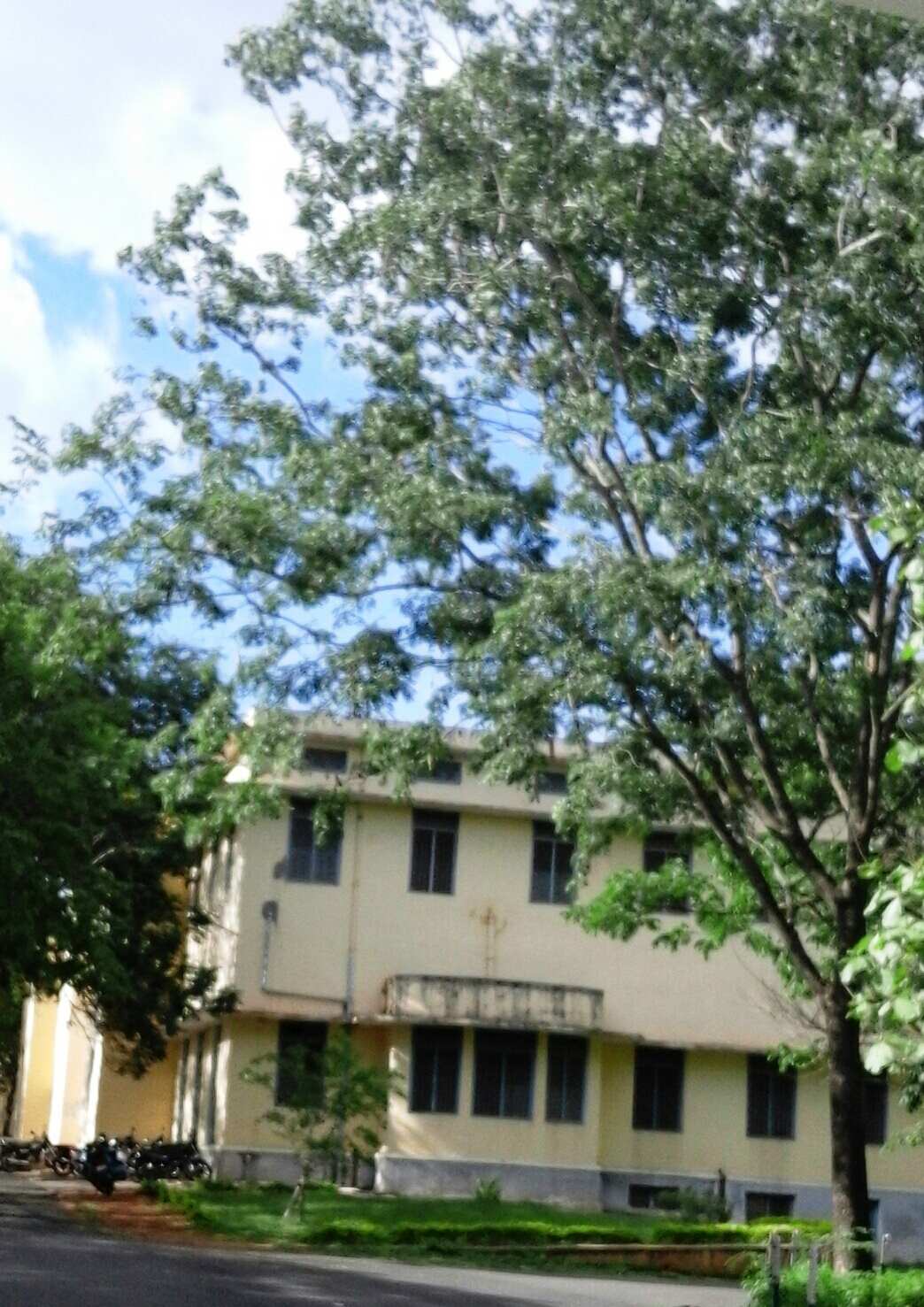
Library building of the Maharaja's College

- Cattamanchi Ramalinga Reddy
- N. S. Subba Rao
- D. L. Narasimhachar
- Sarvepalli Radhakrishnan.
- S. Srikanta Sastri historian, Indologist, and polyglot
- K. V. Puttappa (Kuvempu)
- T. S. Venkannayya
- M. Hiriyanna, Professor of Sanskrit, Philosophy and Aesthetics
- M. N. Srinivas, sociologist
- S. R. Rao, archaeologist
- Ralapalli Anantha Krishna Sharma, Telugu and Sanskrit scholar and musicologist
- C. D. Narasimhaiah, Writer and literary critic, former Principal and Padma Bhushan awardee
- V. Seetharamaiah

== Academics ==
=== Courses ===
- M.Sc. in Geographical Information System
- M.Sc. in Criminology and Forensic Science
- M.A. in Political Science
- M.A. in International Relations
- B.A. in ancient history and archeology and museology
- B.A. in sociology
- B.A. in criminology
- B.A. in public administration
- B.A. in economics
- B.A. in geography
- B.A. in political science
- B.A. in psychology
- B.A. in journalism

== Notable alumni ==
- H. Narayan Murthy
- S. M. Krishna
- R. K. Laxman
- M. V. Seetharamiah
- V. Seetharamaiah
- M. Yamunacharya
- S. Srikanta Sastri
- D. L. Narasimhachar
- R. K. Narayan
- A. R. Krishnashastry
- Kuvempu
- S L Bhyrappa
- Venkataramiah Sitaramiah
- G. S. Shivarudrappa
- B.Saleem Farook
- H. Y. Sharada Prasad, writer, media adviser to Prime Minister Indira Gandhi
- P. Lankesh
- Govindray H. Nayak
- Poornachandra Tejaswi
- T. N. Srikantaiah
- T. S. Shama Rao
- M. Rajashekharamurthy, Union Minister of State for Planning
- Triveni, Kannada novelist
- Aryamba Pattabhi, Kannada novelist
- Chaduranga, Kannada novelist
- B. Prasanna Kumar, politician
- S.V. Setty, first Indian aviator
- Chandan Achar, Indian actor

== Image gallery ==
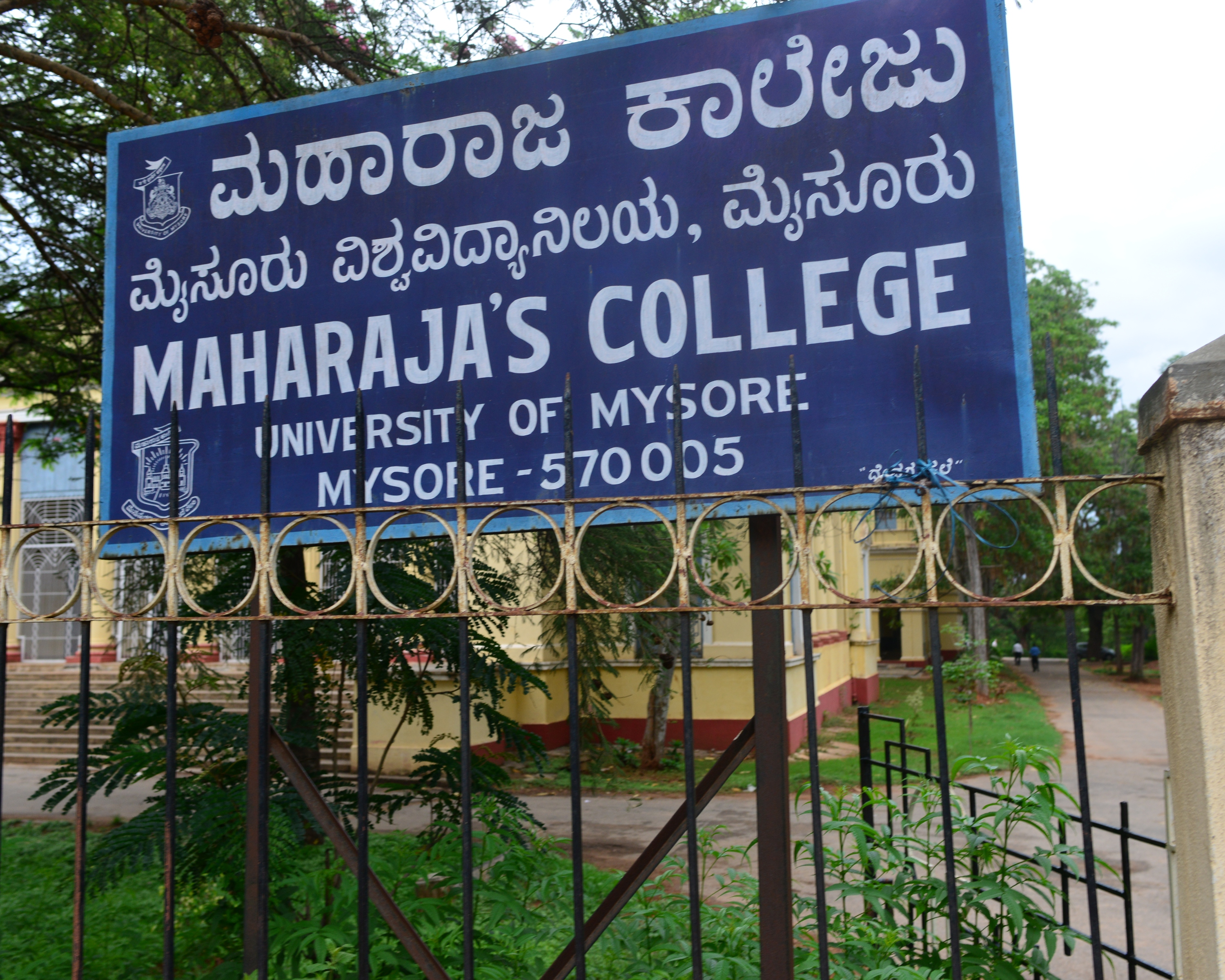
The name board

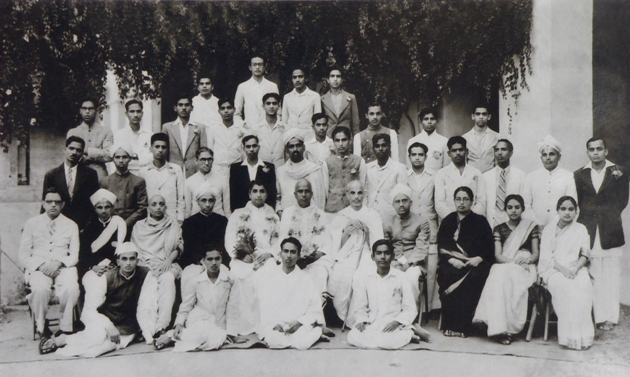
Group Photo

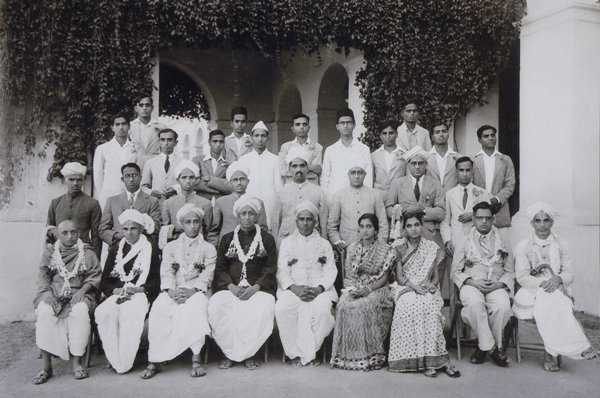
Faculty

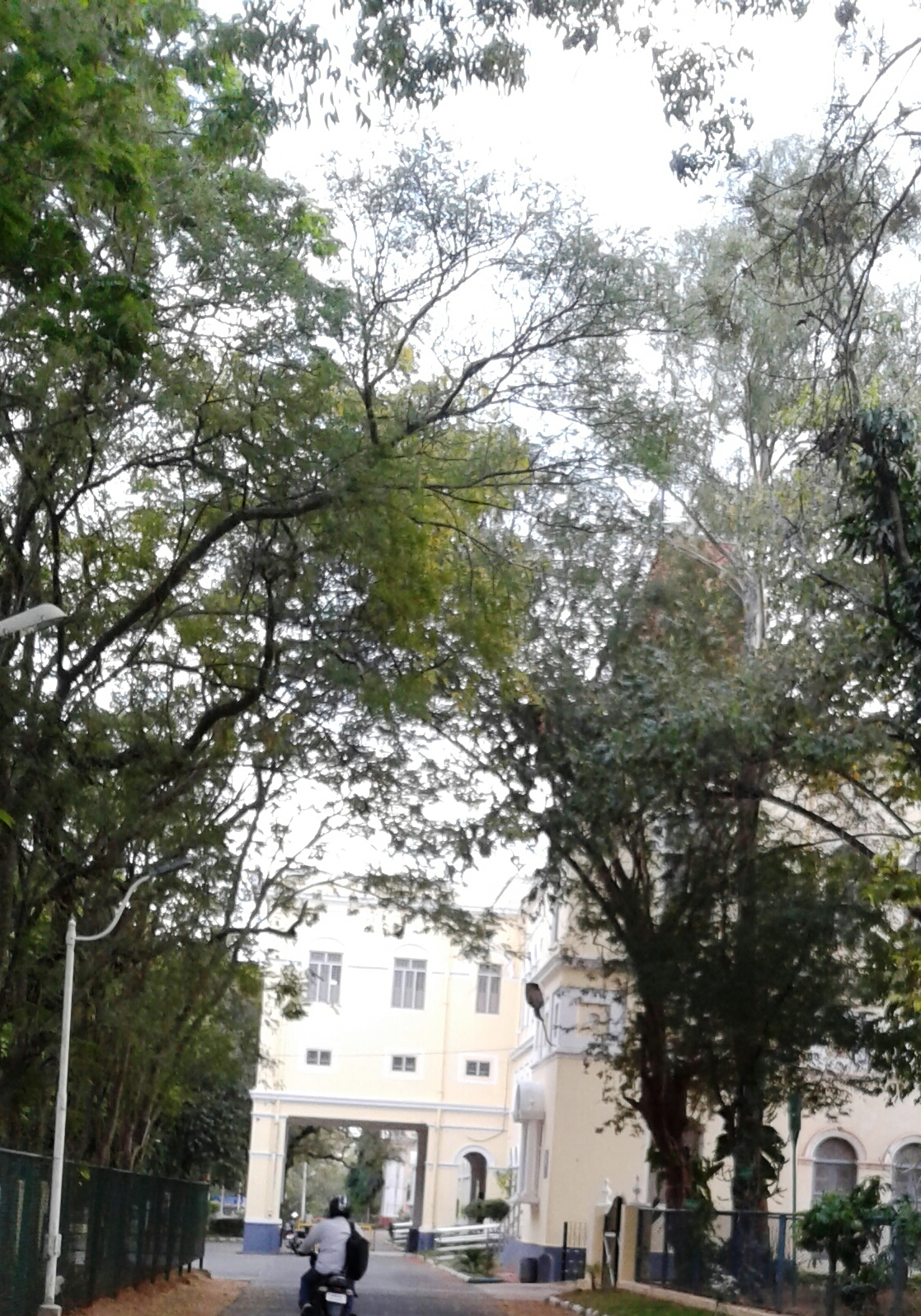
Neighboring Yuvaraja's College

== See also ==
- Krishnaraja Boulevard
- Oriental Library
- Chamarajapuram railway station
- Ballal Circle
- Crawford Hall
- List of educational institutions in Mysore
