= Narasimhaiah =

Narasimhaiah is a surname. Notable people with the surname include:

- C. D. Narasimhaiah or Closepet Dasappa Narasimhaiah (1921–2005), Indian writer, literary critic and principal
- Hosur Narasimhaiah (1920–2005), Indian physicist, educator, writer
