= M. V. Seetharamiah =

Indian Kannada language author (1910–1990)

Mysore Venkatadasappa Seetharamiah
- Born: September 9, 1910; Mysore, Mysore Kingdom
- Died: March 12, 1990 (aged 80); Bangalore, Karnataka
- Education: Mysore University
- Occupations: Author, professor
- Writing career
- Pen name: Raghava
- Notable works: Sri Vijaya kruta Kavirajamarga, Udayadityalankara
- Notable awards: Karnataka Sahitya Academy Award, Rajyotsava Prashasti, and the Kannada Sahitya Parishat Award
- Literary movement: Navodaya Kannada literature

Mysore Venkatadasappa Seetharamiah or M. V. See (Note: Seetharamiah's name has been alternately spelled as Seetharamaiah) (pen name Raghava; 9 September 1910 – 12 March 1990) was an Indian Kannada language author, editor and translator. Through a career spanning over sixty years, he published over 100 works spanning short stories, poetry, novels, and dramas. Some of his notable works included Sri Vijaya kruta Kavirajamarga, a retelling of the classical Kavirajamarga, Udayadityalankara, a work on Kannada poetics, and also other works on ancient Kannada language grammar.

Seetharamaiah was a recipient of the Karnataka Sahitya Academy Award, Rajyotsava Prashasti, and the Kannada Sahitya Parishat Award for his contributions to Kannada literature. He also set up the Bangalore-based B. M. Shri Pratisthana, an organization focused on advancing Kannada language literary studies.

== Early life ==
Seetharamaiah was born on September 9, 1910, in Mysore, in the present day southern Indian state of Karnataka. He completed his master's degree in Kannada literature from Maharaja's College, Mysore in 1933.

== Career ==
After obtaining his degree, he continued to work at the Mysore University, working as a research assistant. During this time he worked on developing an English to Kannada language dictionary, working with some of the leading language scholars of the time. Some of his collaborators and mentors from the period included B. M. Srikantaiah, TS Venkannaiah, A. R. Krishnashastry, T. N. Srikantaiah, and D. L. Narasimhachar. He worked as a professor at the Government Arts College in Bangalore between 1946 and 1963. He was later inducted into the Kannada department of the Bangalore university where he worked as a University Grants Commission professor between 1967 and 1974.

=== Writing career ===
As a writer, he belonged to the second wave of the Navodaya or renaissance period of Kannada literature, continuing in the tradition of Masti Venkatesha Iyengar. His writings focused on showcasing some of the social issues of the time. He wrote under the pen name 'Raghava' and wrote over 100 works throughout his writing career. Among his major contributions include establishing authorship of Kavirajamarga, where he noted that the author of the classical work was Sri Vijaya and Nrupatunga, the Rashtrakuta emperor was mainly credited with approving the content. His re-writing of the classic was titled Sri Vijaya kruta Kavirajamarga. His other major contributions included the study of ancient Kannada grammar. Some of his other works included Udayadityalankara, a work focused on Kannada poetics. He also studied the role played by Kannada poets on the language's discourse evolution and wrote on ancient Kannada language grammar. Archana and Keertana Kusumanjali were a collection of devotional songs that he summarized. He also wrote poems for children including Banna Bannada Navilugari Haakide Pustakadali Mari. He also wrote a biography and study of the works of the Kannada language writer Muddana and another of author D. V. Gundappa for his birth centenary in 1988.

He was a recipient of the Karnataka Sahitya Academy Award, Rajyotsava Prashasti, and the Kannada Sahitya Parishat Award for his contributions to Kannada literature. He also hosted Pustakalokana, a book review program on All India Radio.

In 1979, Seetharamaiah set up the B. M. Shri. Pratisthana, a research organization in Bangalore focused on advancing Kannada language literary studies and research. The organization was named after his teacher B. M. Srikantaiah. As of 2009, the organization has developed into a research center and has partnered with Hampi University and is offering M. Phil and PhD programs. The institution now houses a postgraduate research center named after Seetharamaiah.

=== Select works ===
- Udayadityalankaram (1970)
- Pracheena Kannada Vyakaranagalu (1980)
- Bharateeya Kavyameemamsege Kannada Kavigala Koduge (1970)
- Shastra Sahitya (1975)
- Samanyanige Sahityacharitre Male (1975)
- Srivijaya Kruta Kavirajamarga (1968)
- Kannada Sahityadalli Shantharasa (1970)
- Dheemanta: Biography of D. V. Gundappa (1988)
- Archana
- Sri Krishna Leelamruta
- Keertana Kusumanjali

== Personal life ==
In addition to writing, Seetharamaiah was also trained in the fine arts playing the Mridangam, the Indian percussion instrument played in Carnatic music, and also painted. Seetharamaiah died in Bangalore on March 12, 1990. He was aged 80. He suffered from arthritis and asthma prior to his death.
