= Ambale =

Ambale may refer to:

- Ambale, Chamarajanagar, Karnataka, India
- Ambale, Mawal, Pune district, Maharashtra, India
