= Sitaramayya =

Sitaramayya, Sitaramaiah, Seetharamaiah or Sita Ramayya (Telugu: సీతారామయ్య) is an Indian given name. Notable persons with that name include:

- Seetharamaiah, the main character in the 1991 Telugu film Seetharamaiah Gari Manavaralu
- Siddaramaiah (born 1948), Karnataka politician
- Bhogaraju Pattabhi Sitaramayya, Indian independence activist and political leader of Andhra Pradesh
- Kondapalli Seetharamaiah, communist leader from Andhra Pradesh
- M. V. Seetharamiah, a Kannada scholar and writer
- V. Seetharamaiah - Kannada Poet, Writer, Editor and Teacher at University of Mysore
