= C. D. Narasimhaiah =

Indian writer (1921–2005)

- Born: 21 May 1921; Closepet, Kingdom of Mysore
- Died: 12 April 2005 (aged 83); Bangalore, Mysore State, India
- Resting place: Dhvanyaloka campus, University of Mysore
- Occupations: Writer; Academic
- Years active: 1950–2005
- Awards: Padma Bhushan; Rajyotsava Prashasti

Closepet Dasappa Narasimhaiah (1921–2005) was an Indian writer, literary critic and the principal of Maharaja's College, Mysore. Narasimhaiah was best known for his literary criticisms and for bringing out an abridged version of Discovery of India of Jawaharlal Nehru, under the title, Rediscovery of India. He was a recipient of the Rajyotsava Prashasti honor of the Government of Karnataka. The Government of India awarded him the third highest civilian honour, the Padma Bhushan, in 1990, for his contributions to literature.

== Biography ==
Born in Closepet (present-day Ramanagara) of Ramanagara district in the south Indian state of Karnataka on 21 May 1921 to a shopkeeper, Narasimhaiah graduated from the University of Mysore and did his higher studies at the Universities of Cambridge and Princeton before joining Maharaja's College, Mysore as a professor of English literature in 1950. He became the principal of the institution in 1957 and worked there till his superannuation in 1962. In between, he served as a Fulbright visiting professor at Yale University for the academic year 1958–59 and after his retirement from Mysore University, served the University of Queensland as a visiting professor in 1963. Later, joining with a few like-minded personalities, he founded Dhvanyaloka Centre For Indian Studies, a centre for promoting studies on Indian culture and arts, in 1979. He also served as the resident scholar of International Research Centre, Bellagio (1968) and as a consultant to East-West Centre, Hawaii for two terms (1974–75 and 1987).

Narasimhaiah, the first patron of Asian origin of the Association of the Study of Australia in Asia (ASAA), published several books on literature, culture and arts, the abridged version of Discovery of India of Jawaharlal Nehru, published in 1981 by the Jawaharlal Nehru Memorial Fund is the most notable among them. Jawaharlal Nehru: A Study of His Writings and Speeches, The writer's Gandhi, The Human Idioms (Three lectures on Jawaharlal Nehru),The Swan and the Eagle: Essays on Indian English Literature, Raja Rao, Makers of Indian English literature and The Flowering of Australian Literature are some of the other books published by him.

Narasimhaiah was married to Ramalakshamma and the couple had a son, C. N. Srinath who co-wrote some of his books, and a daughter. He died in Bengaluru, at his daughter's house, on 12 April 2005, at the age of 83, survived by his children; his wife had preceded him in death. His life is documented in an autobiography, N for Nobody: Autobiography of an English Teacher, published in 1991, as a part of New world literature series.

== Awards and honors ==
The Government of Karnataka awarded him the Rajyotsava Prashasthi, the second highest civilian honor of the State in 1987. He received the Padma Bhushan, the third highest civilian honor in the country from the Government of India in 1990. The University of Mysore conferred the degree of DLitt (honoris causa) on him in 2001 and the University of Bangalore followed suit in 2005. He held the fellowships of several institutions which included Indian Institute of Advanced Studies (1968), Leeds University (1971–72), Texas University (1972–73 and 1975–76), Peradeniya University, (1979) and Flinders University (1980). Theory in Practice: Essays in Honour of C.D. Narasimhaiah is a book published in honor of Narasimhaiah, in 2001, and "C.D. Narasimhaiah's Contribution to Post-Colonial Literary Criticism" is a study of his writings.

== Bibliography ==
- C. D. Narasimhaiah (1960). Jawaharlal Nehru: A Study of His Writings and Speeches. Rao and Raghavan.
- C. D. Narasimhaiah (1963). F.R. Leavis: some aspects of his work. Rao and Raghavan.
- C. D. Narasimhaiah; University of Mysore. Dept. of Post-graduate Studies and Research in English (1966). Literary criticism: European and Indian traditions. Dept. of Post-graduate Studies and Research in English, University of Mysore.
- C. D. Narasimhaiah (1967). The writer's Gandhi. Punjabi University.
- C. D. Narasimhaiah (1967). The human idioms: three lectures on Jawaharlal Nehru. Blackie.
- C. D. Narasimhaiah (1970). Indian Literature of the Past Fifty Years, 1917-1967. Prasaranga, University of Mysore.
- Closepet Dasappa Narasimhaiah (Anglist); S. Nagarajan; Indian Council for Cultural Relations (1971). Studies in Australian and Indian Literature: Proceedings of a Seminar. Indian Council for Cultural Relations.
- C. D. Narasimhaiah; United States Educational Foundation in India (1972). Students' Handbook of American Literature. Kalyani Publishers.
- C. D. Narasimhaiah (1973). Raja Rao. Arnold-Heinemann India.
- Jawaharlal Nehru; Closepet Dasappa Narasimhaiah (1981). The Discovery of India. Jawaharlal Nehru Memorial Fund.
- Closepet Dasappa Narasimhaiah; C. N. Srinath (1981). The Flowering of Australian Literature. Literary Criterion.
- C. D. Narasimhaiah (1986). The function of criticism in India: essays in Indian response to literature. Central Institute of Indian Languages.
- C. D. Narasimhaiah (1987). The Swan and the Eagle: Essays on Indian English Literature. Indian Institute of Advanced Study. ISBN 978-81-208-0327-5.
- C. D. Narasimhaiah (1 January 1990). The Indian Critical Scene: Controversial Essays. B.R. Publishing Corporation. ISBN 978-81-7018-599-4.
- C. D. Narasimhaiah (1990). An Anthology of commonwealth poetry. Macmillan India.
- C. D. Narasimhaiah (1991). N for Nobody: Autobiography of an English Teacher. B.R. Publishing Corporation. ISBN 978-81-7018-682-3.
- C. D. Narasimhaiah (1995). Essays in Commonwealth Literature: Heirloom of Multiple Heritage. Pencraft International. ISBN 978-81-85753-06-5.
- C. D. Narasimhaiah (1977). Moving Frontiers of English Studies in India. S. Chand.
- C. D. Narasimhaiah (January 1978). Awakened conscience: studies in Commonwealth literature. Sterling.
- C. D. Narasimhaiah; C. N. Srinath; Coomi S. Vevaina (1997). Negotiating Differences: Aspects of Contemporary Canadian Literature. Dhvanyaloka.
- C. D. Narasimhaiah (2000). The Vitality of West Indian Literature: Caribbean and Indian Essays. Dhvanyaloka.
- C. D. Narasimhaiah (2000). Makers of Indian English literature. Pencraft International. ISBN 978-81-85753-34-8.
- C. D. Narasimhaiah (1 January 2001). Jawaharlal Nehru: The Statesman as Writer. Pencraft International. ISBN 978-81-85753-41-6.
- C. D. Narasimhaiah (1 January 2002). English Studies in India: Widening Horizons. Pencraft International. ISBN 978-81-85753-51-5.
- C. D. Narasimhaiah; Satish C. Aikant (1 January 2004). Critical spectrum: essays in literary culture : in honour of Prof. C.D. Narasimhaiah. Pencraft International. ISBN 978-81-85753-64-5.

== See also ==
- Discovery of India
- Maharaja's College, Mysore
