= Krishnaraja Boulevard =

Coordinates: 12.303079°N 76.639511°E

- Interactive map of Krishnaraja Boulevard
- Location: Mysuru, Karnataka, India

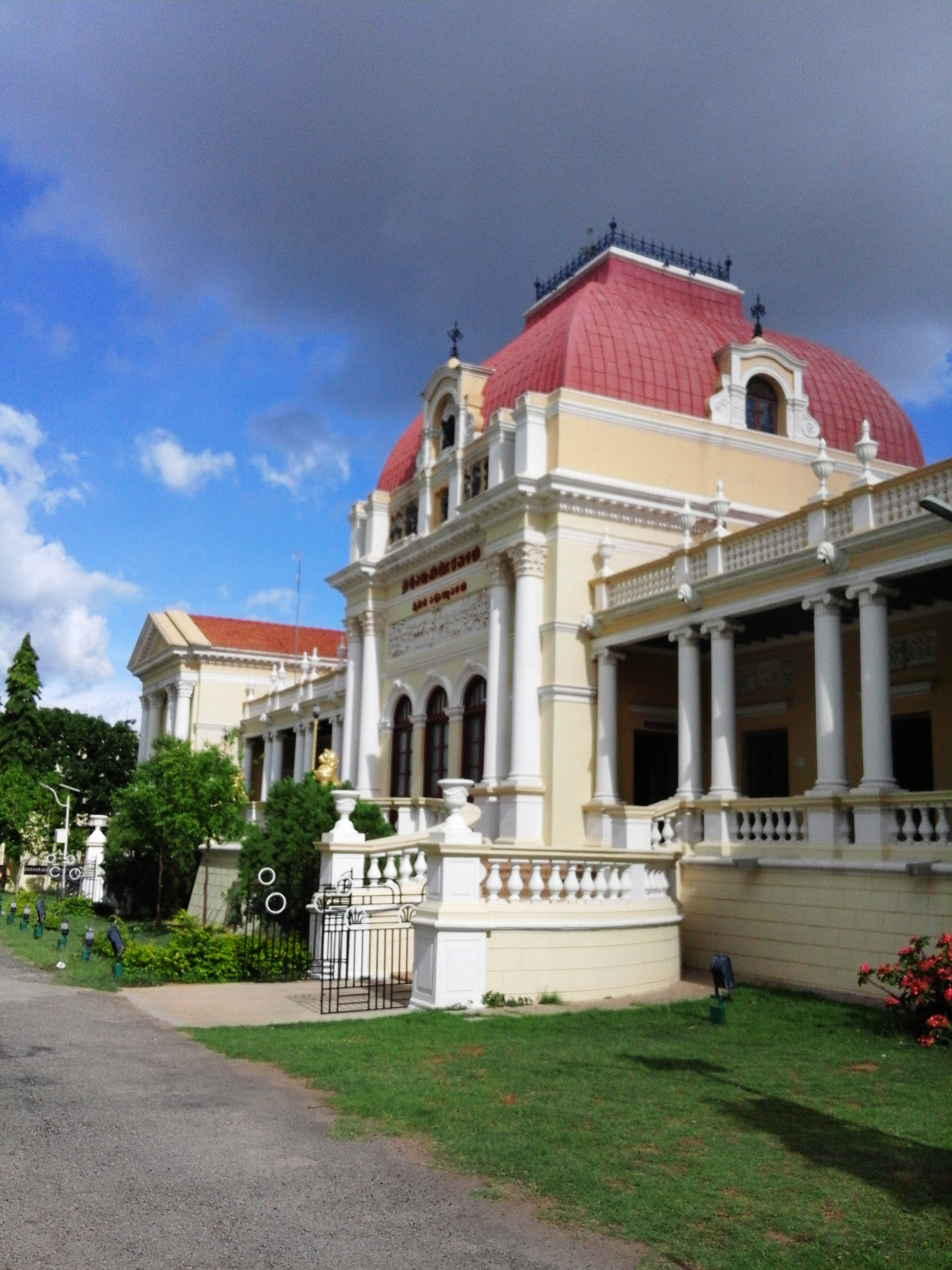
Oriental Library

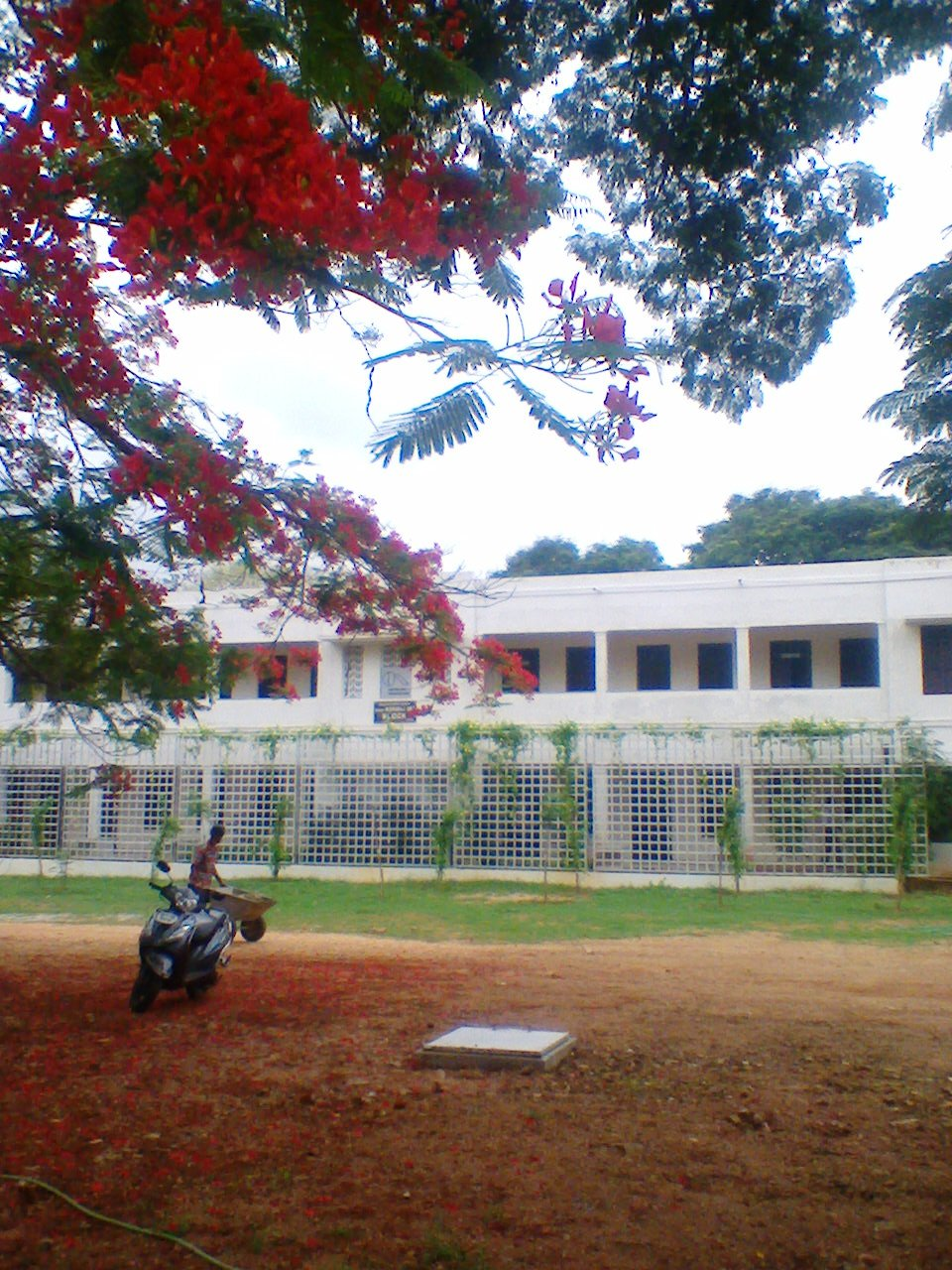
Center for Architecture

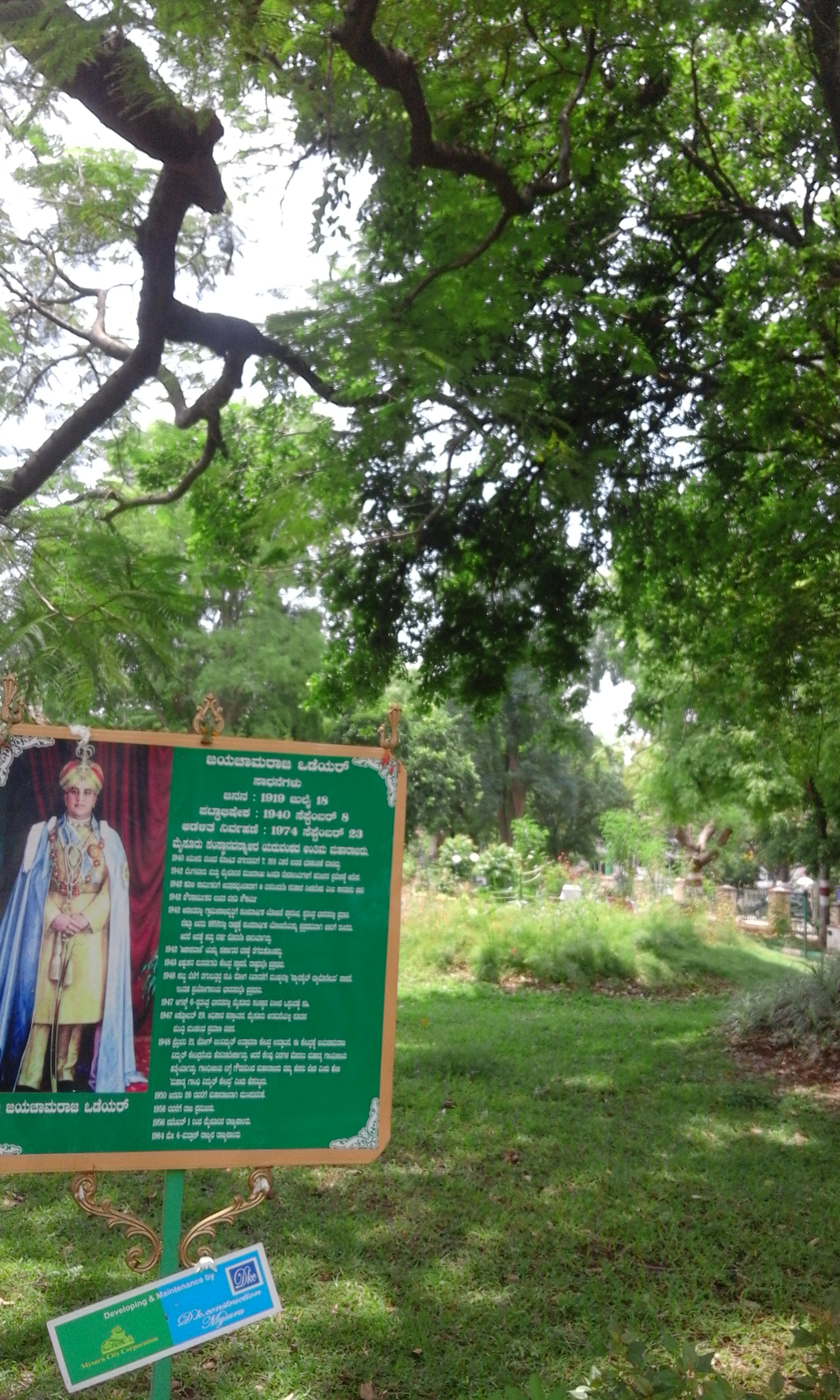
Twin Parks of the District Court

Krishnaraja Boulevard is a significant street in Mysore, Karnataka, India.

== Location ==
Krishnaraja Boulevard is located on the southern side of Mysore between Saraswathipuram and Ballal Circle.

== History ==
Krishnaraja Boulevard is considered one of the historic streets of Mysore city. It features grills along the median and is lined with flowering trees on both sides.

== Diminishing Glamour ==
Recently, the boulevard has been neglected by civic authorities, leading to its use as a parking space for vehicles.

== Historic Buildings ==
This dual-carriageway is lined with numerous historic buildings, including the Oriental Library, Maharajas College, the Deputy Commissioner's Office, the District Court Complex, Urs Boarding School, the College of Architecture, and Yuvrajasa College. Additionally, the main office of Mysore University, also known as Crawford Hall, is located here.

== Length ==
Stretching approximately 1 km in length, the boulevard begins at the underbridge junction near Balla Circle and extends to Hunsur Road on the northern side. Renowned heritage expert Prof. NS Rangaraju has identified the boulevard as one of the 15 roads recognized by the city council for its heritage significance.

== Image gallery ==
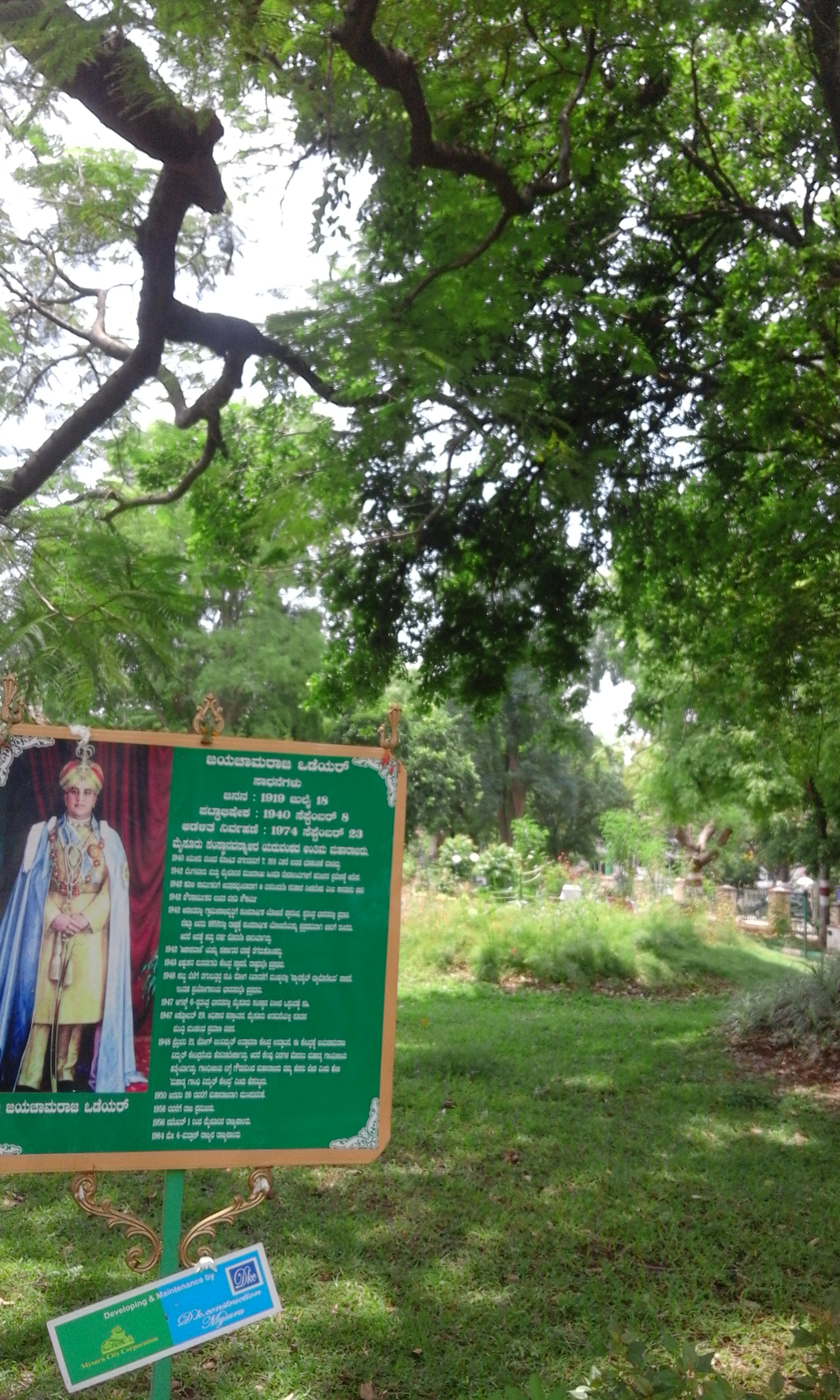
Twin Court Park

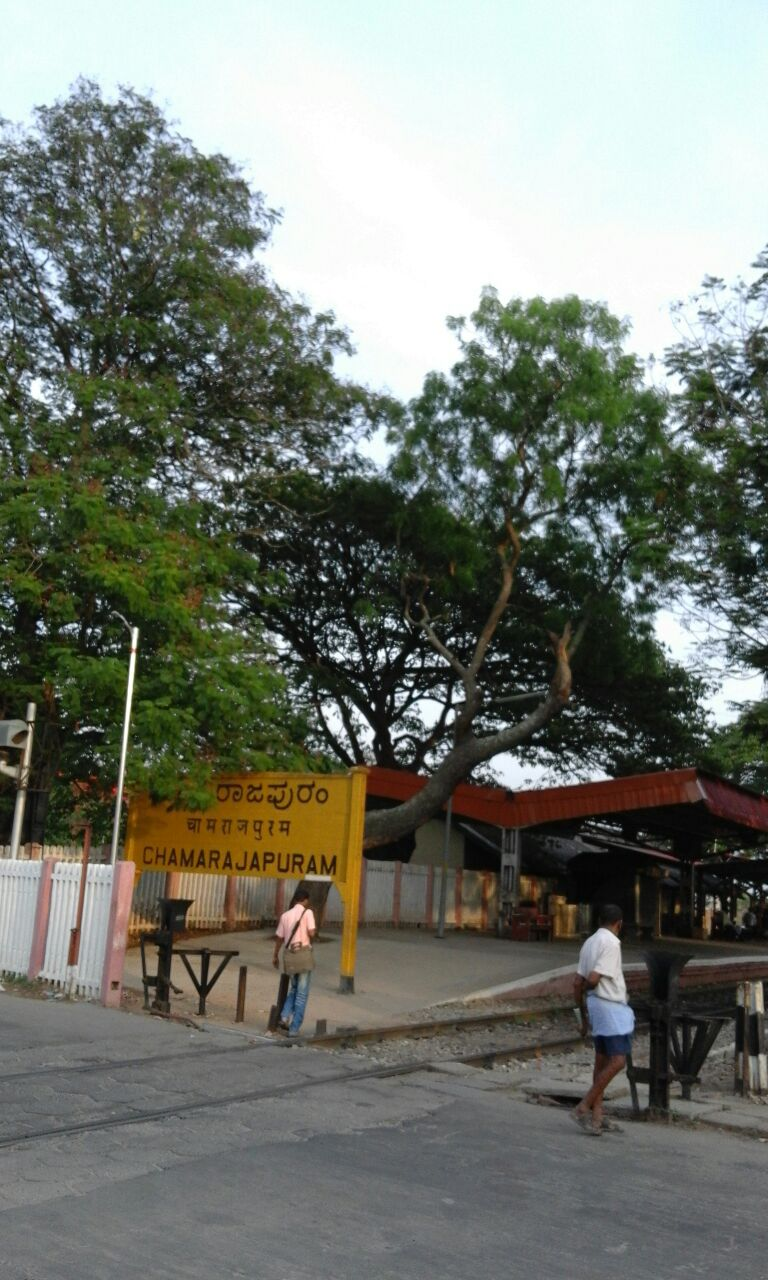
Chamarajapuram Railway Station

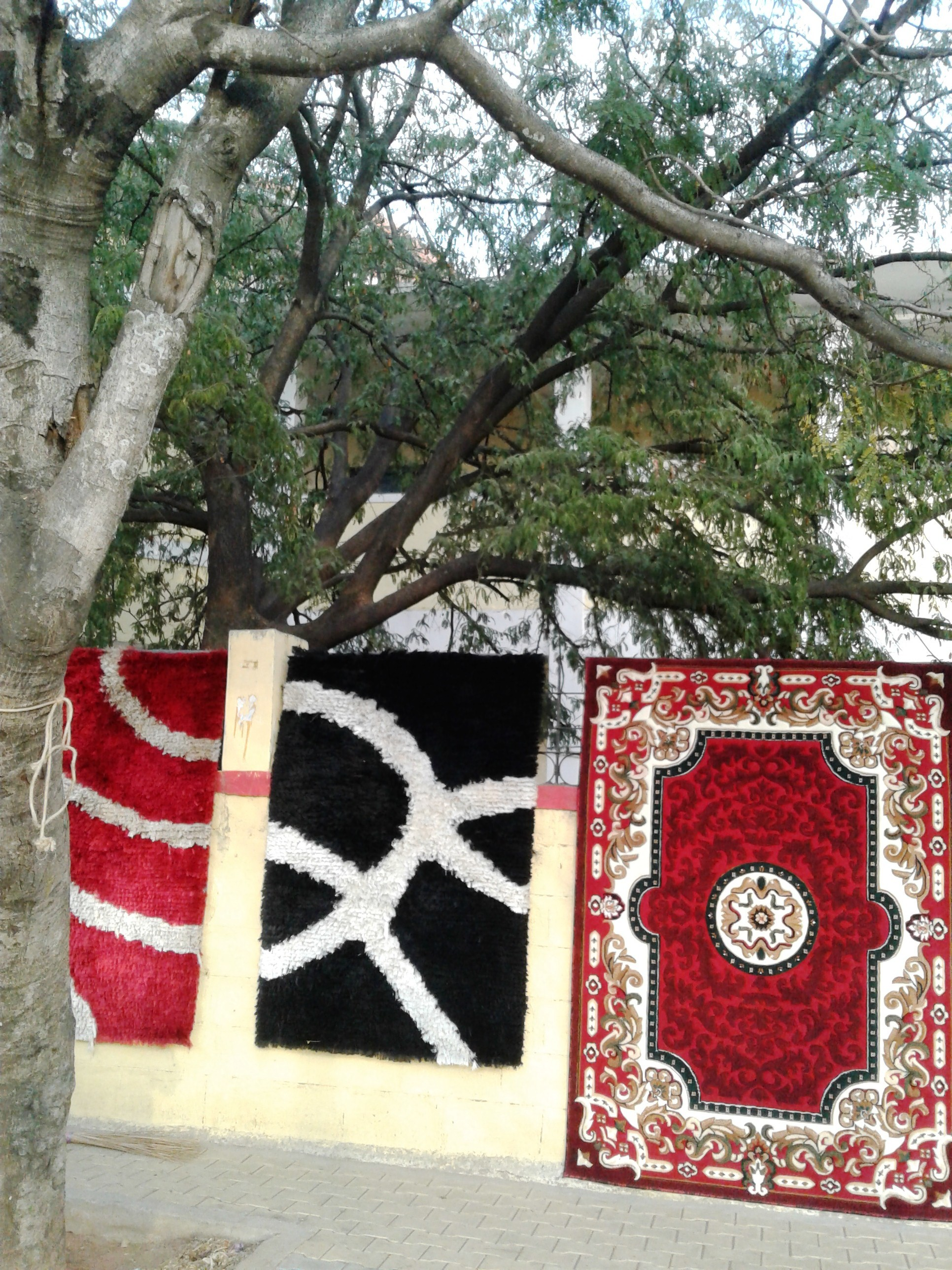
Carpet Sellers

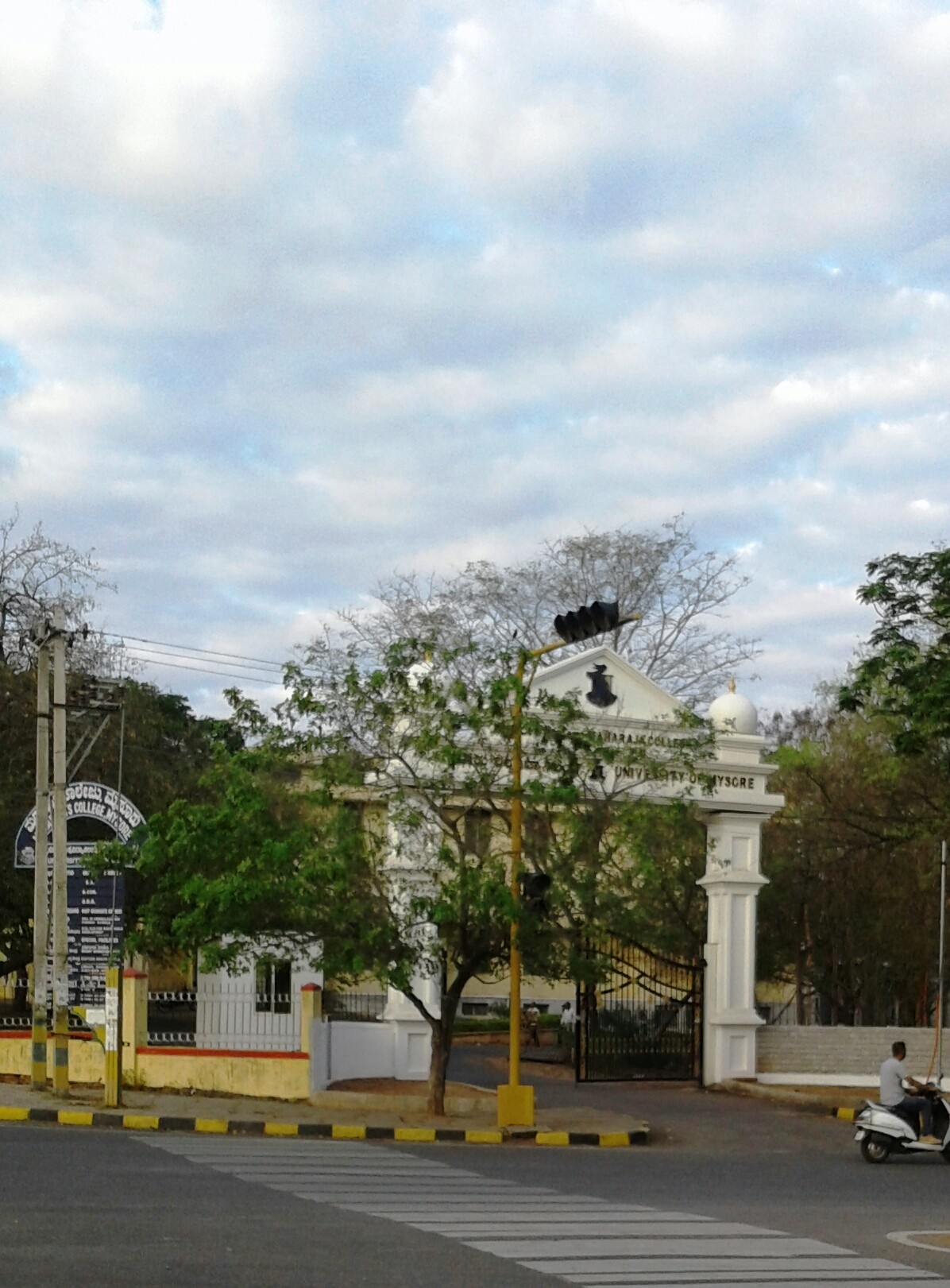
Maharajas College

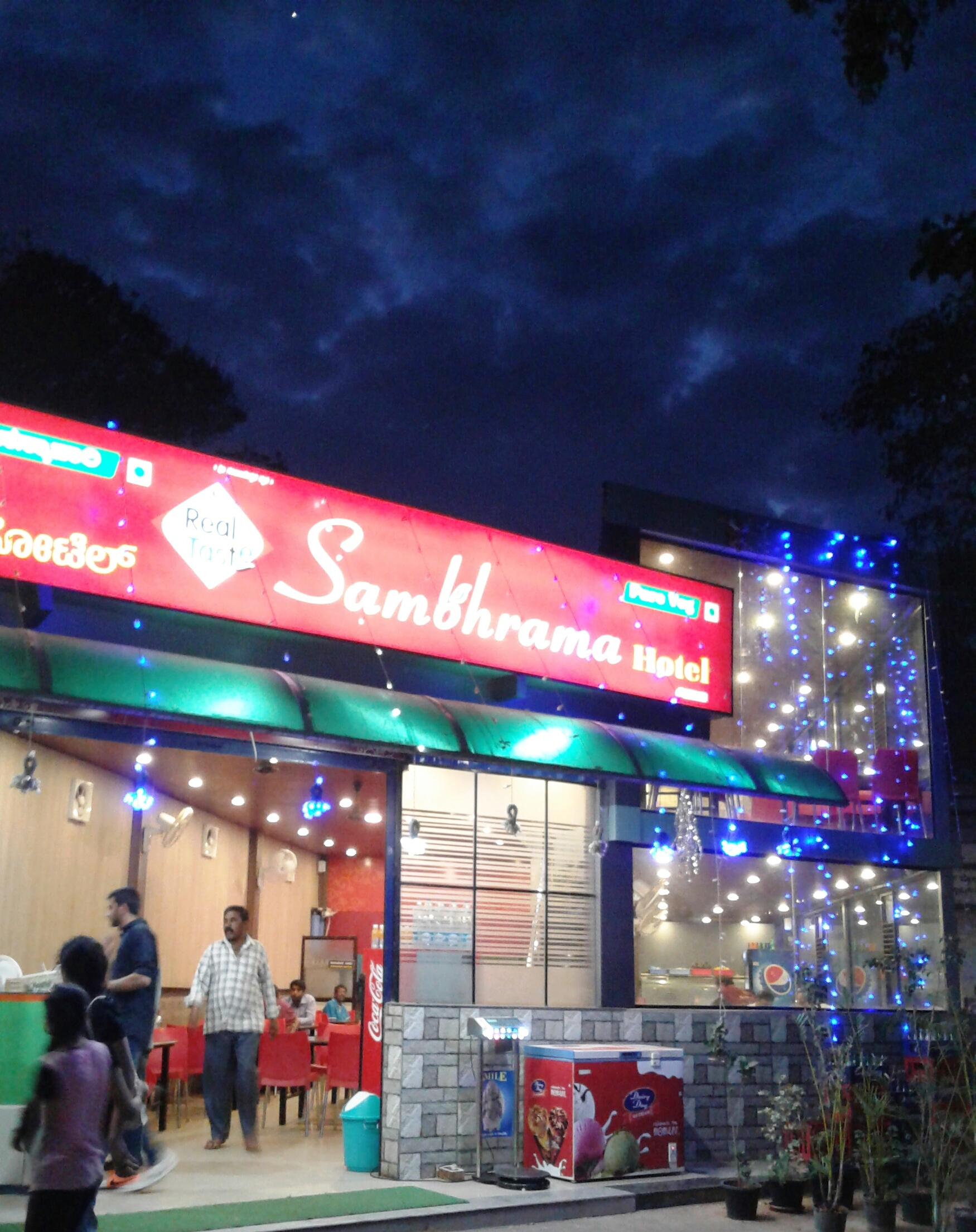
Nethradama Junction

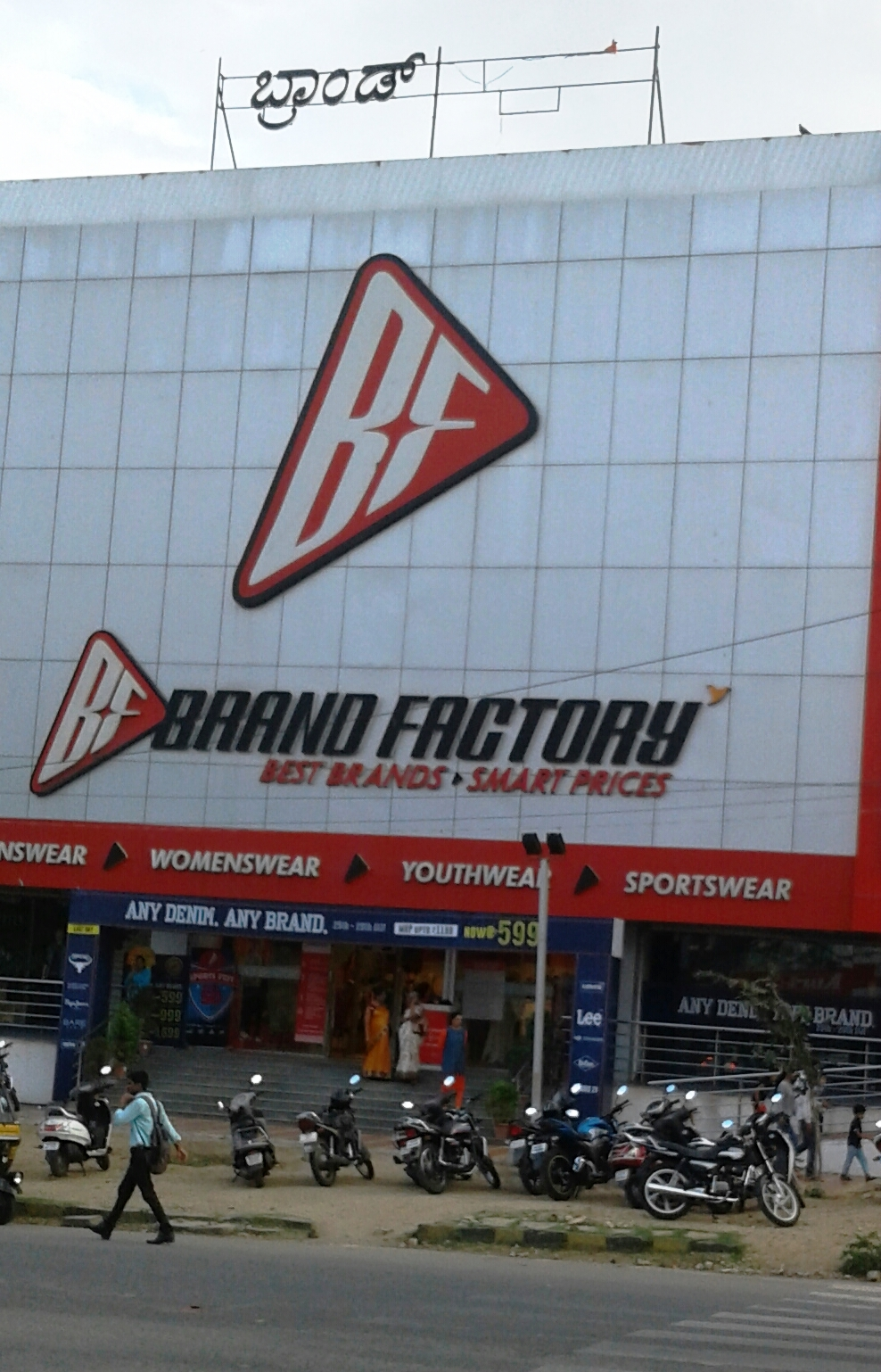
Underbridge junction

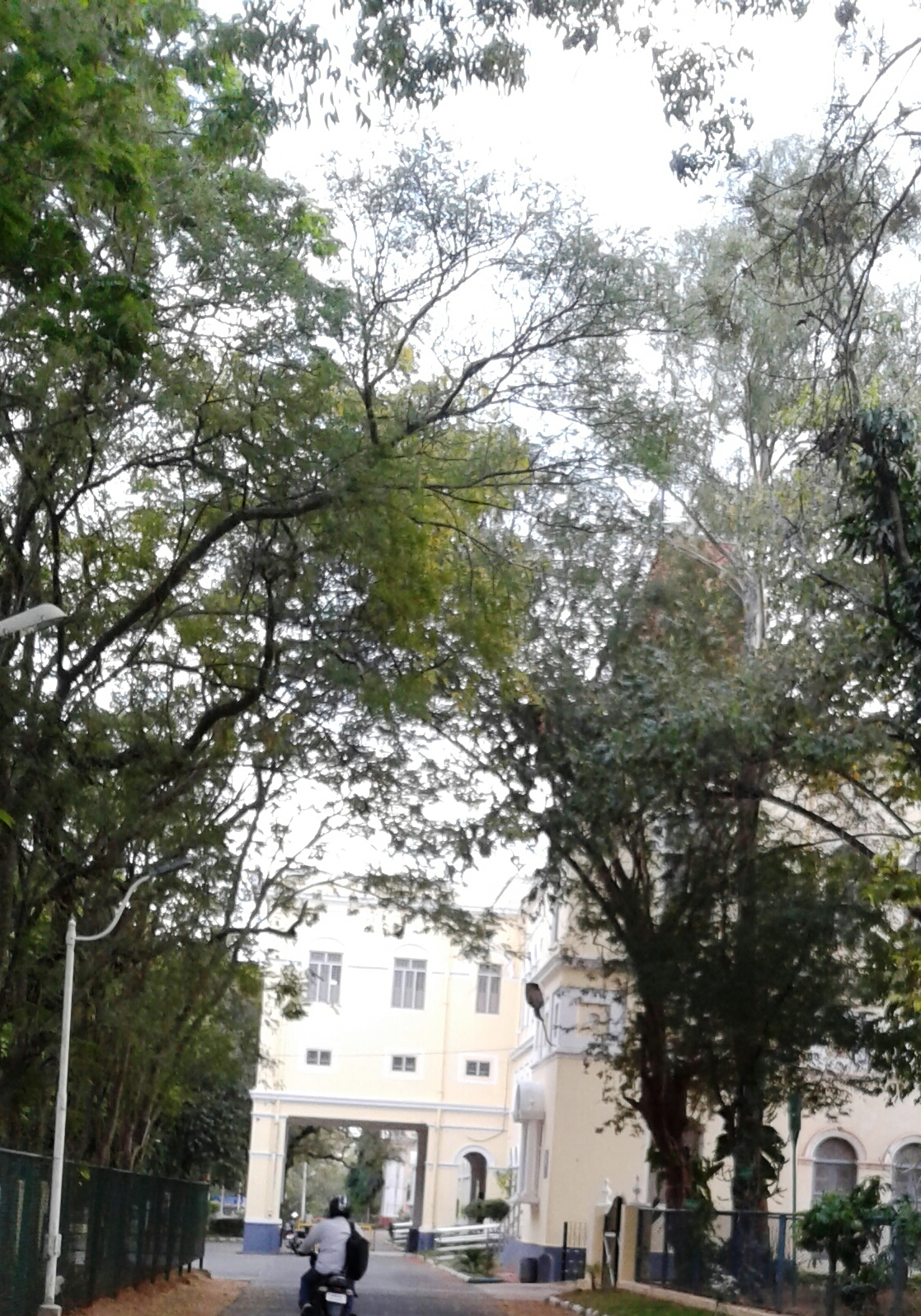
Yuvarajas College

== See also ==
- Oriental Library
- Maharajas College
- Chamarajapuram railway station
- Ballal Circle
- Crawford Hall
