= T. N. Srikantaiah =

Indian Kannada grammarian, academic, scholar and poet (1906–1966)

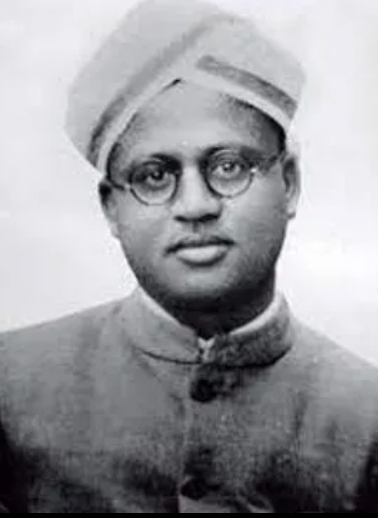
- T. N. Srikantaiah (1937)
- Born: 26 November 1906; Teerthapura, Chikkanayakanahalli, Tumkur district, British India
- Died: 7 September 1966 (aged 59); Kolkata, West Bengal, India
- Education: B.A., M.A.
- Occupations: Professor; Writer; Poet; Grammarian
- Writing career
- Pen name: Thi. Nam. Shri
- Genres: Grammar; Literary Criticism; Fiction
- Subjects: Grammar and literary criticism
- Movement: Navya
- Website: T. N. Srikantaiah

Theerthapura Nanjundaiah Srikantaiah (26 November 1906 – 7 September 1966) commonly known as 'Thee. Nam. Shree, was a Kannada poet, essayist, editor, translator, linguist and teacher. He was awarded the Pampa Prashasthi for his work on the history and tradition of Indian poetics spanning two millennia titled Bharathiya Kavyamimamse. T. N. Srikantaiah was instrumental in preparing and publishing the Kannada version of the Constitution of India in 1952. He is credited with the use of the vernacular equivalent of Rashtrapathi for the English 'President', a usage which is still in vogue. Srikantaiah was responsible for guiding the doctoral theses of Kannada litterateurs like S. Anantanarayan and M. Chidananda Murthy. An active participant in the Kannada Dictionary Project, Srikantaiah later laid the foundations for the Post Graduate Department at Manasa Gangotri campus at University of Mysore.

== Early years ==
Srikantaiah was born in Theerthapura village in Tumkur district to Shanbog Nanjundaiah and Baluvaneeralina Bhagirathamma. He had his preliminary schooling at the local government school. Srikantaiah assumed the pen name of Bharathi Dasa under which he wrote articles for the School Folk magazine. His mother Baluvaneeralina Bhagirathamma died when he was nine years of age.

== Education ==
Srikantaiah began his studies in his native village of Theerthapura in 1916 and attended middle school in Chikkanayakanalli, which was not far from his village. Three years hence he was admitted to the Govt. Collegiate High School at Tumkur. By 1926, T. N. Srikantaiah had completed his B.A. in Kannada. Nalwadi Krishna Raja Wodeyar had awarded him six gold medals at the convocation. As the M. A. qualification was not yet available in Kannada, Srikantaiah pursued his M.A. in English and secured first rank for the university (1929). While studying for his M. A., Srikantaiah had also cleared his civil service exams (MCS) by 1928. This qualification along with a M. A. degree helped him secure an employment at the Revenue offices in Srirangapatna. by 1930, B. M. Srikantaiah had founded the M. A. course in Kannada and T. N. Srikantaiah took the course. He passed his M.A. in Kannada in 1931 and was awarded three gold medals. About two decades hence, by 1955, Srikantaiah was granted the Rockefeller Scholarship which enabled him to visit the United States for a year to do research at Michigan University, Pennsylvania.

== Academician ==
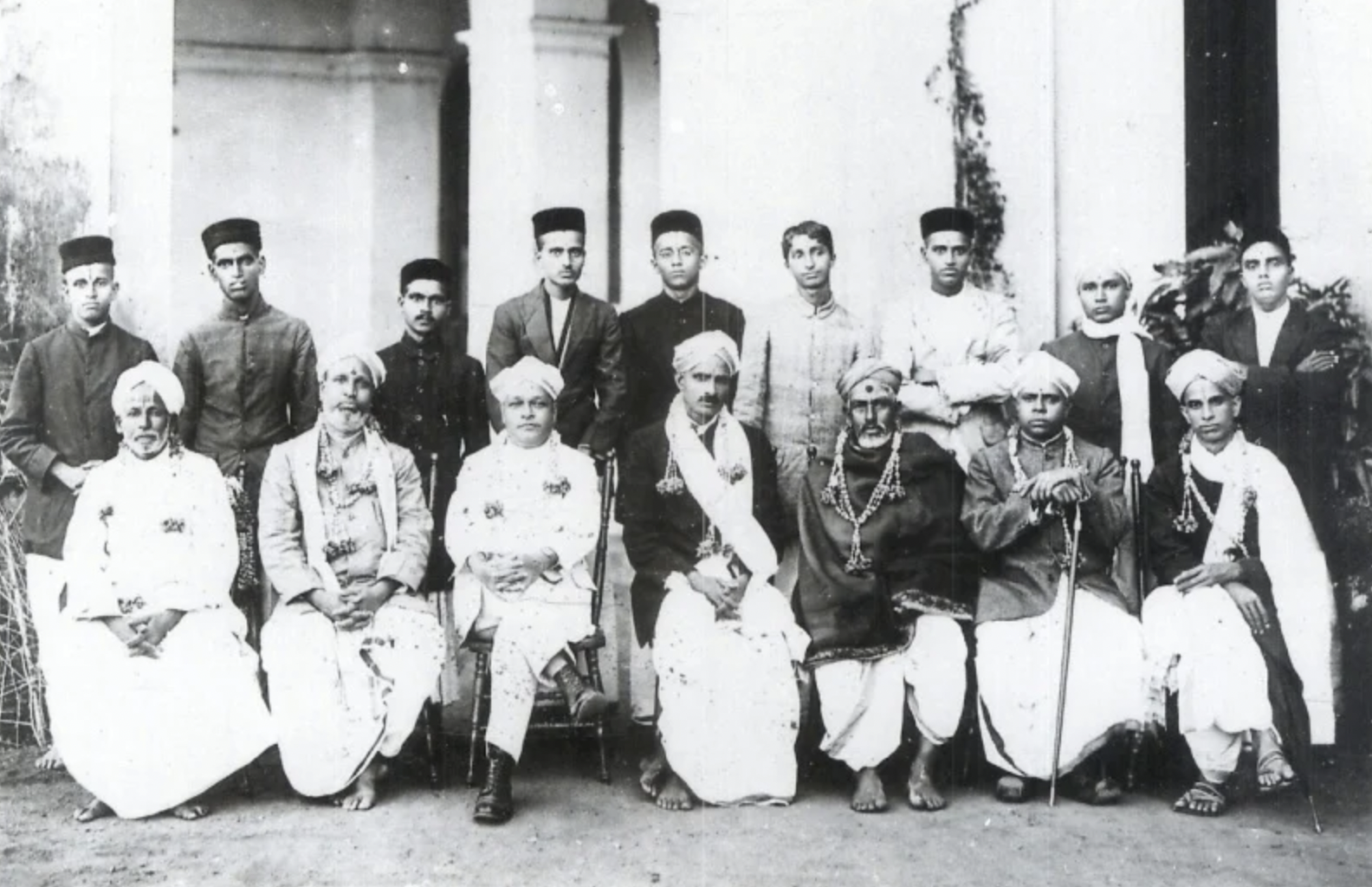
Maharaja College Group Photo (1940s): L – R – Standing 6 from left (Kuvempu), 7 from left (T. N. Srikantaiah); Sitting on Chairs – L – R – 3 from left (B. M. Srikantaiah), 4 from left (T. S. Venkannayya)

T. N. Srikantaiah began his teaching career at Maharaja College, Mysore. B. M. Srikantaiah and T. S. Venkannayya persuaded T. N. Srikantaiah to join the Kannada department at the college. By 1943, T. N. Srikantaiah was promoted as associate professor at Central College, Bangalore. Till 1950, Srikantaiah was associated with Kannada Dictionary project along with A. R. Krishnasastry. For two years between 1948 – 50, Srikantaiah was associated with Mysore Samvidhana Parishat. From 1950 – 52, Srikantaiah taught at colleges in Kolar and Davangere districts of Karnataka. Dharwad Karnataka University had just founded the Kannada department in 1952 and invited T. N. Srikantaiah to be its first Kannada professor. While at Dharwad, Srikantaiah was in close correspondence with his peers at Deccan College, Pune. For eight months between 1955 – 56, Srikantaiah did research at the Michigan University, Pennsylvania before returning to University of Mysore in 1957.

== Works ==
T. N. Srikantaiah's first published work was a collection of his poems in Kannada titled Olume. A collection of thirteen essays came out in 1963 under the title of Nantaru. T. N. Srikantaiah's first foray into translation was a Kannada translation of select passages from Amara Shataka (originally in Sanskrit) titled Bidi Muthu which was published in 1970. Srikantaiah, at the behest of T. S. Venkannayya wrote Rakshasana Mudrike, which was a Kannada version of the popular Sanskrit play Mudrarakshasa authored originally by Vishakadatta in 3rd century B. C. Srikantaiah's work on Kannada grammar titled Kannada Madhyama Vyakarana was first published in 1939 and was a standard text book on grammar.

=== Bharatiya Kavya Mimamse ===
His critically acclaimed work Bharatiya Kavya Mimamse (Kannada: ಭಾರತೀಯ ಕಾವ್ಯ ಮೀಮಾಂಸೆ) was about Indian poetics across millennia. It was a detailed analysis of the relationship between 11th century Alankara poetry (Figure of speech) and various Indian prose & poetic styles. T. N. Srikantaiah's book delved deep into the tradition of Kavyalankara and related classical texts and asserts that Rasa-Dhvani principles are an integral part of this comparison between different streams of poetry. This seminal work was brought forth under the guidance of M. Hiriyanna and B. M. Srikantaiah at Mysore. Bharathiya Kavya Mimamse became the second work to receive the prestigious Pampa Prashasthi in Karnataka.

=== Editorial works ===
- Hennu Makkala Padagalu
- Hariharakaviya Nambiyannana Ragale
- Gadāyuddha Saṅgrahaṃ: Kāvyabhāga Mattu Tippaṇigalu

=== Collected works ===
- Pampa
- Kāvya samīkṣe
- Samalokana
- Kavyanubhava
- Imagination in Indian Poetics and other literary studies
- Nantaru
- Tī. Naṃ. Śrī. śēṣa-viśēṣa
- Tī. Naṃ. Śrī samagra gadya
- Affricates in Kannada speech and other linguistic papers

=== Translations ===
- Bidi Muthu
- Rakshasana Mudrike

=== Poetry ===
- Olume
- Indian Poetics

=== Grammar ===
- Kannada Madhyama Vyakarana

=== Guide for Doctoral Theses ===
- S. Anantanarayan's Hosagannadada Sahityada Mele Paschatya Kavyada Prabhava
- M. Chidanandamurthy's Kannada Shasanagala Samskruthika Adhyayana
- M. R. Ranganatha's Morphophonemic Analysis of the Kannada Language – Relative Frequency of Phonemes and Morphemes in Kannada

== Recognition ==
T. N. Srikantaiah's suggestion for the use of the vernacular word Rashtrapathi in place of the English word President was welcomed and adopted into vogue at the Indian Constitutional Committee meeting in 1949. Srikantaiah was granted the Rockefeller Scholarship which enabled him to visit the United States for a year to do research at Michigan University, Pennsylvania in 1955. T. N. Srikantaiah presided over the Sahitya Sammelana Bhasha Bandavya Ghosti (Literary Festival) in 1943. In 1957, he chaired the Dravida Samskruthi Ghosti (South Indian Literary Conference). Srikantaiah was secretary of the Summer School of Linguistics, Mysore from 1958 – 60. In 1960, he was appointed as secretary of The All India Linguists' Association. T. N. Srikantaiah had the honour of being the first Kannada Professor in the Kannada Department at Karnatak University, Dharwad. His work Bharathiya Kavya Mimamse became the second work to receive the prestigious Pampa Prashasthi in Karnataka. The Department of Kannada and the Ti Nam Sri Birth Centenary Committee initiated a year long celebration of Srikantaiah's life in 2006 to commemorate his birth centenary. This was done in coordination with a number of educational institutions including the Central Institute of Indian Languages – Mysore, Deccan College – Pune and the Central Sahitya Academy – New Delhi. South End Circle in Jayanagar, Bangalore has a statue of T. N. Srikantaiah and has been named after him.

== Later years ==
T. N. Srikantaiah retired in 1962 after 34 years of service. Following his retirement, he was made a UGC Professor at the University of Mysore. He was invited to be an adjunct professor at Delhi University. He declined it owing to many ongoing commitments. While on a tour of North India, T. N. Srikantaiah succumbed to a heart attack on 7 September 1966 at Calcutta (present day Kolkata), India.

== Bibliography ==
- Chidanandamurthy, M.; Sri Nagabhushana (1976). Śrīkaṇṭhatīrtha: Tī. Naṃ. Śrī. Smārakagrantha (1st ed.) – Ti. Naṃ. Śrīkaṇṭhayya's Festschrift. pp 20–110
- Javare Gowda, D; Chaluve Gowda; Bhairavamurty (2006). Śrīkaṇṭha Darśana (1st ed.) – Commemoration volume on Ti. Naṃ. Śrīkaṇṭhayya, 1906–1966. ppXIV – XXV
- Murthy Rao, A. N. (1988). Samagra Lalita Prabandhagalu. (1st ed.) – Complete Collection of Essays. pp 36 – 42
- Murthy Rao, A. N. B. M. Srikantaiah (1st ed.) – Biography. pp XII
- Sanna Guddayya, H. G. Ti Nam Srikantaiah – Jeevana, Vyakthithva Mathu Kruthigala Sameekshe – Biography of T. N. Srikantaiah. pp 200
- Akkamahadevi (Editor) (2020). Ranna Gadāyuddham – The Duel of the Maces. Published by Manohar – United Kingdom. pp 36
- Amur, G. S. (2001). Essays on Modern Kannada Literature. Karnāṭaka Sāhitya Akāḍemi. pp 59, 60.
- Sinhā, Madhubālā (2009). Encyclopaedia of South Indian Literature – Volume 2. Anmol Publications. pp 259
- C. Panduranga Bhatta, G. John Samuel, Shu Hikosaka, M. S. Nagarajan (1997). Contribution of Karnāṭaka to Sanskrit. Institute of Asian Studies (Madras, India). pp 17
- The Indian P.E.N. – Volume 33. P.E.N. All-India Centre, Bombay. (1967) pp 16, 17.
- Nāyaka, Harōgadde Mānappa; Translators: M. Rama Rao, Subōdha Rāmarāya (1967). Kannada Literature – A Decade. Published by Rao and Raghavan. pp 74, 79
- Balakrishnan, Raja Gopal (Editor)(1994). The Rashtrakutas of Malkhed – Studies in the History and Culture. Mythic Society (Bangalore, India) pp 399.
