= A. R. Krishnashastry =

Indian writer, researcher and translator in the Kannada language (1890–1968)

- Born: Ambale Ramakrishna Krishnashastry; 12 February 1890; Amble, Kingdom of Mysore
- Died: 1 February 1968 (aged 77); Bangalore, Mysore State, India
- Occupations: Writer; professor; journalist
- Writing career
- Genres: Fiction, Mythology
- Movement: Navodaya
- Website: A. R. Krishnashastry

Ambale Ramakrishna Krishnashastry (1890–1968) was an Indian writer, researcher and translator in the Kannada language. Krishnashastry has remained popular four decades after his death through his work Vachana Bharata, and his narration of the Hindu epic Mahabharata in the Kannada.

== Early life ==
Krishnashastry was born on 12 February 1890, in Ambale, Kingdom of Mysore (in present-day Karnataka, India), into a Smarta Hoysala Karnataka Brahmin family. His parents were Ramakrishna Shastry, grammarian and principal of Sanskrit school in Mysore, and Shankaramma, a homemaker; she died of disease when he was ten. Due to poverty, he was compelled to study Kannada and Sanskrit for his Bachelor of Arts degree (1914) though he wanted to pursue a career as a scientist. He started his first job as a clerk in the Attara Kacheri (secretariat) in Mysore. He worked as a tutor and a researcher at Oriental Library (later renamed the Oriental Research Institute) at Mysore before enrolling for his Master of Arts degree at the Madras University. He later served as a professor in Kannada and researcher at the Mysore University until his retirement. Krishnashastry married at the age of sixteen to Venkatalakshamma who was only ten at that time.

Krishnashastry was called as Kannada Senani by writer and folklorist H. M. Nayak. He was the first to start a Karnataka association at the Central College, Bangalore. Later, similar associations spread throughout Karnataka.

Some of Krishnashastry's notable disciples include Kuvempu, T. N. Srikantaiah, M. V. Seetharamiah, S. Srikanta Sastri and G. P. Rajarathnam.

== Literary works ==
Krishnashastry was a polyglot. Apart from his mother tongue Kannada, he could speak fluently in Sanskrit and English. He was also proficient in Pali, Bengali (self taught), Hindi, and German. He had a good working knowledge of English and German and this helped him to work and translate some of the great works from those languages to Kannada. Krishnashastry brought out many of nuances of great Sanskrit plays of Kālidāsa, Bhavabhuti and Bhasa during his translations to Kannada. Krishnashastry's biography of Bankim Chandra Chattarjee, a noted Bengali novelist earned him a Central Sahitya Academy award. Krishnashastri wrote numerous other short stories and novels including Vachana bharata, Nirmalabharati and Kathaamruta. Vachanabharata and Nirmalabharati are an abridged versions of the Hindu epic Mahabharata. Kathaamruta is a collection of stories from Kathasaritsagara, huge anthology of hundreds of fables, parables and other stories in Sanskrit. Kathaamruta has a well written introduction to Indian and western cultural traditions. In 1918, Krishnashastry started Prabuddha Karnataka, a Kannada language newspaper and worked as its editor.

== Awards and honors ==
- Sahitya Academy award
- D. Lit of Mysore University

== Writings ==
=== Novels ===
- Vachana bharata
- Nirmalabharati

=== Biographies ===
- Sri Ramakrishna Paramahamsa charitre
- Bannkim Chandra

=== Short story collections ===
- Shreepatiya Kategalu
- Kathaamrutha - Kannada translation of Kathasaritsagara

=== Plays ===
- Samskruta Nataka
- Harischandrakavya Sangraha

=== Other ===
- Alankara ( kannada handbook on Alankara shastra - 1927, Mysore university)
- Bhasa Kavi ( A critique on Sanskrit playwright Bhasa - Central college Karnataka Sangha - 1922)
- Sarvajnana Kavi
- Bhashanagalu Mattu Lekhanagalu ( Speeches and Writings )
- Nagamahashaya (Author: Sarat Chandra Chakravarty) translated from Bengali to Kannada - 1937

== See also ==
- Kannada
- Kannada literature
