= Ballal Circle =

Coordinates: 12.29530°N 76.64185°E

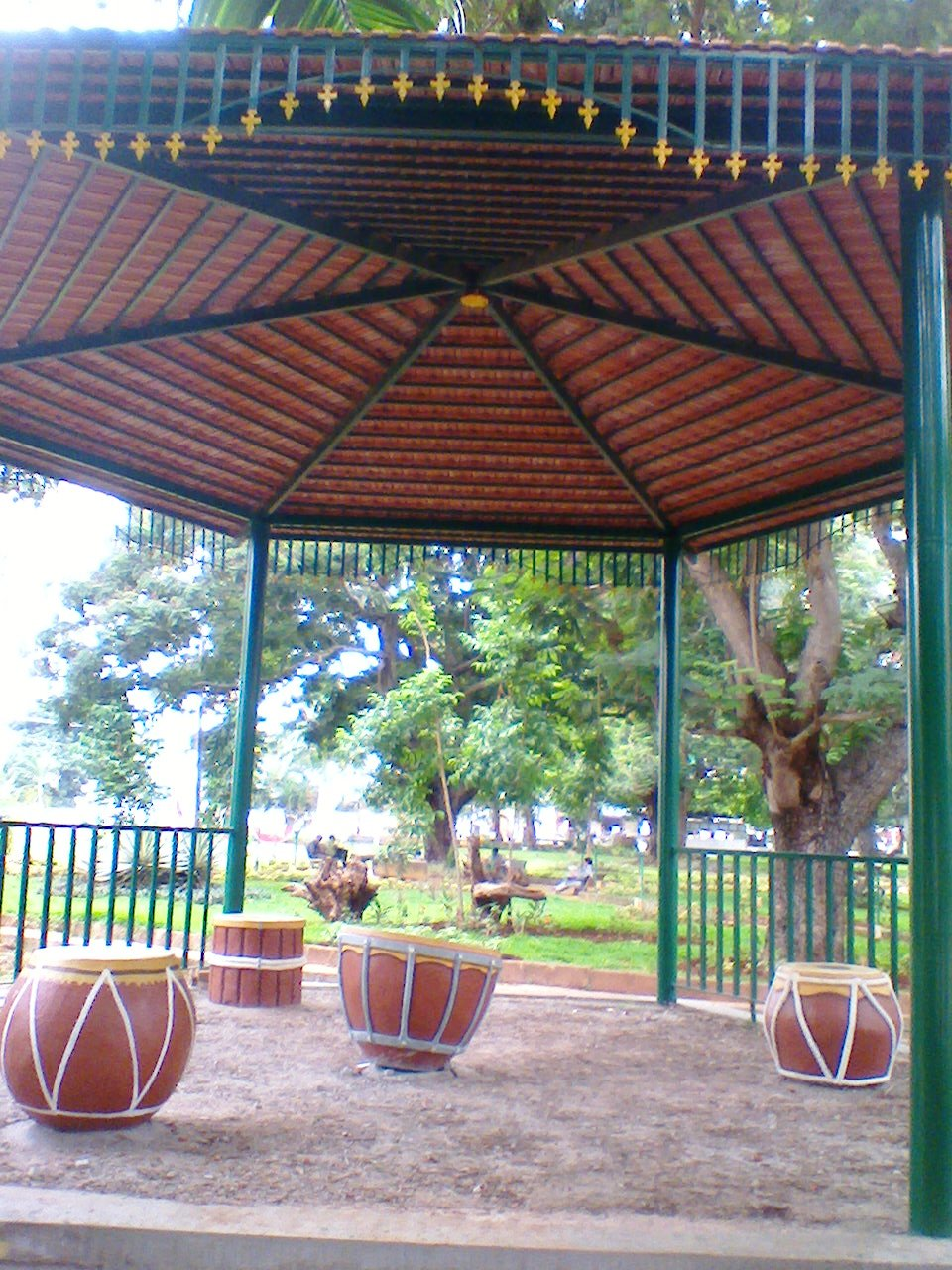
Ganesha Park Near Ashoka Circle

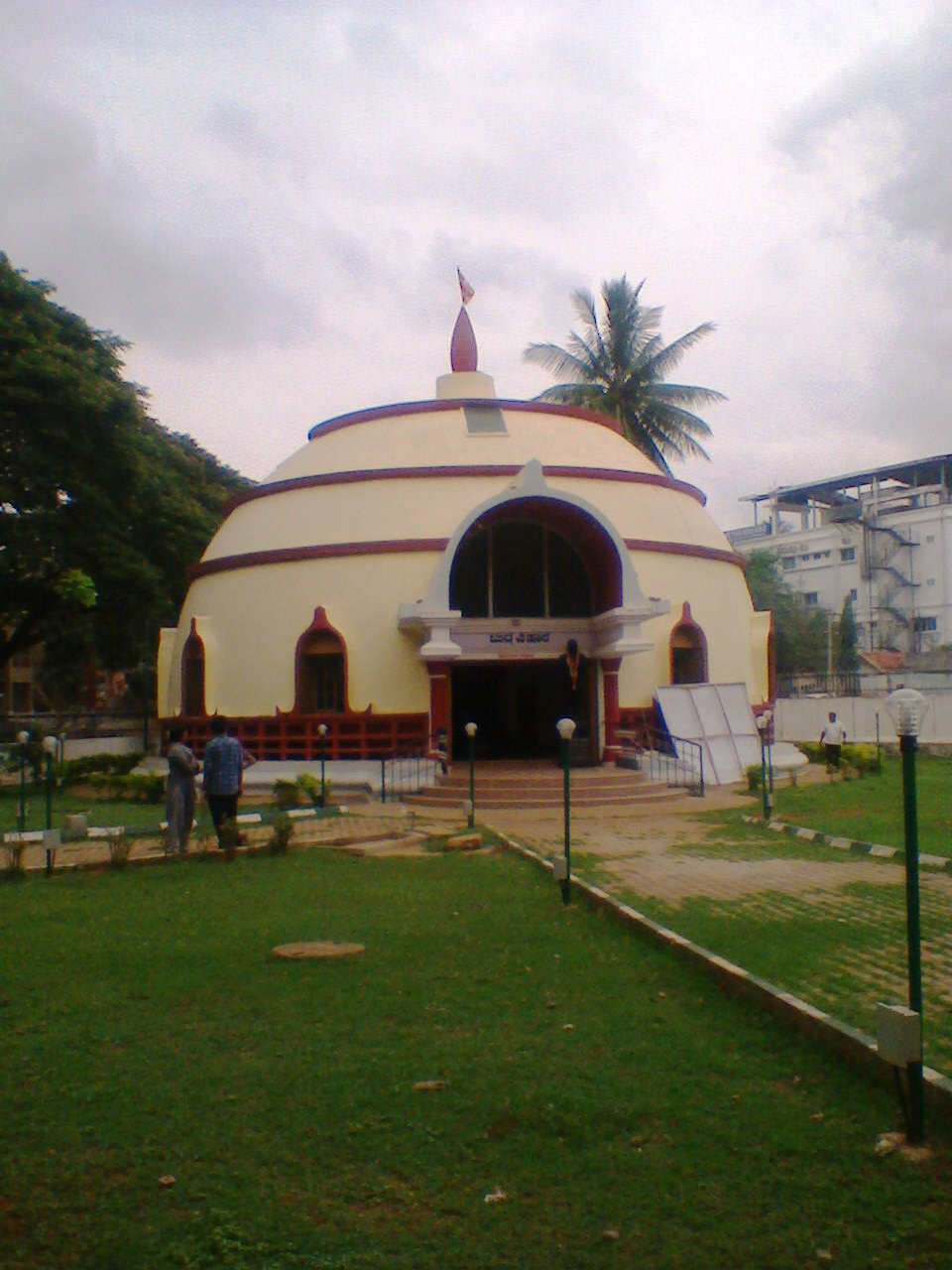
Vishwa Maithri Buddha Vihara Ashoka Circle.

Ashoka Circle, officially known as Ashokapuram, is one of the major traffic junction in Mysore city, Karnataka state, India.

== Location ==
Asoka Circle is located between Kuvempunagar and Mysore Palace. There is an old park near Ashoka Circle commonly called as Ganesha Park with big trees of long growth.

It got its name from the simple "Ballal Hotel" which adorned the corner towards RTO / Ramaswami circle.

== Vishwa Maithri Buddha Vihara ==
Vishwa Maithri Buddha Vihara Near Ashoka Circle. This is one of the Buddhist Vihara in Mysore City With a Mini Prayer Hall and Dome Shaped Exterior as you see in Buddha Viharas Across the world.

== Temples ==
There are many temples in Asoka Circle. The oldest temple is in Krishnamurthypuram 2nd cross Aralikatte Ganapathi Temple and Guru raghavendra temple opp to Ganesha Park.

== Important Landmarks ==
- S.D.M.I.M.D. Women's college
- Nithyotsava Choultry
- Vedanta Hemmige Circle
- Santhosa Hospital
- Mysore Hatha Yoga
- Annapurna Hospitals
- Ashwini Hospitals
- Madhavachar Circle
- Sri Ashoka Stores

== Image gallery ==
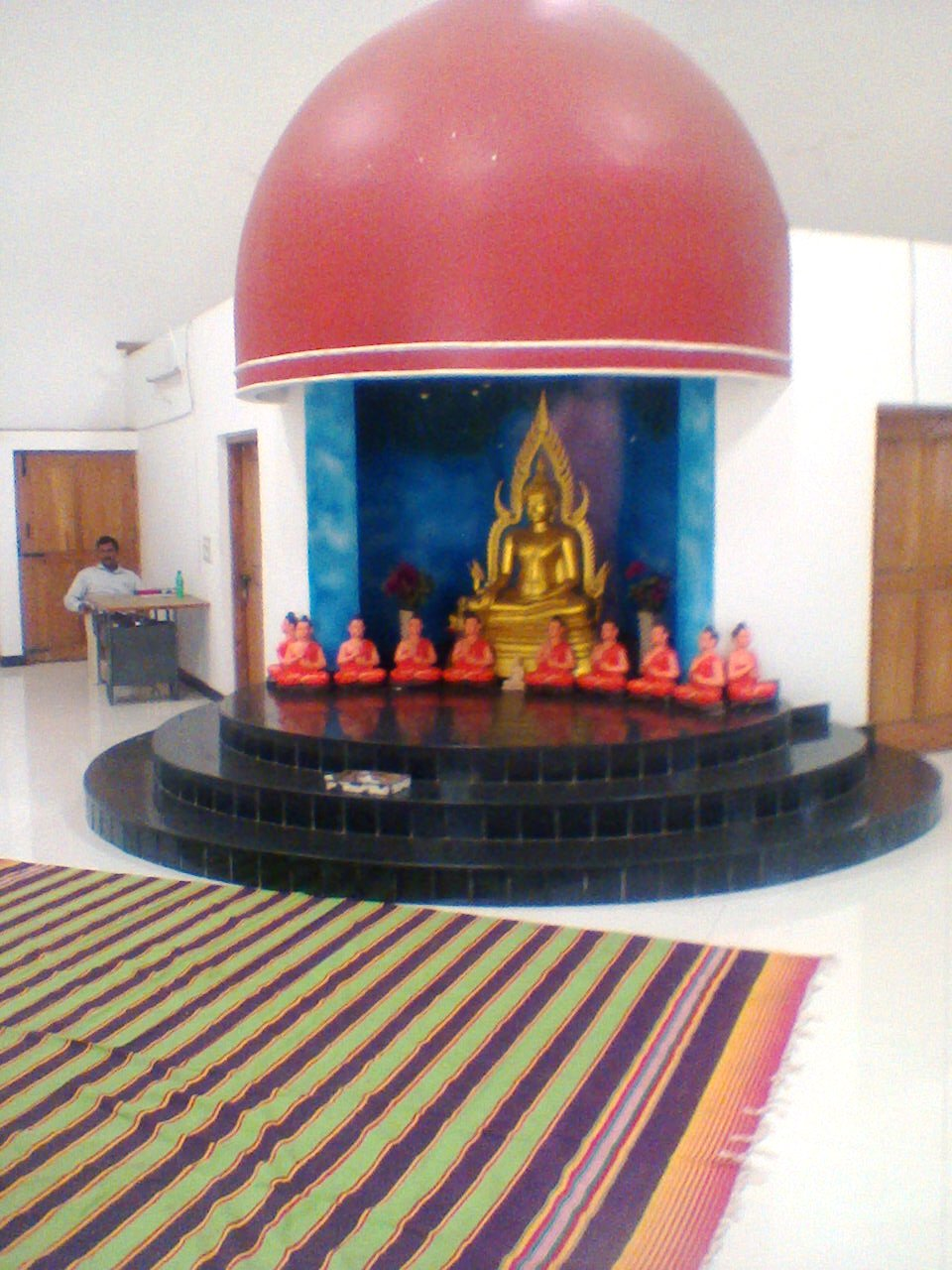
Ambedkar Memorial

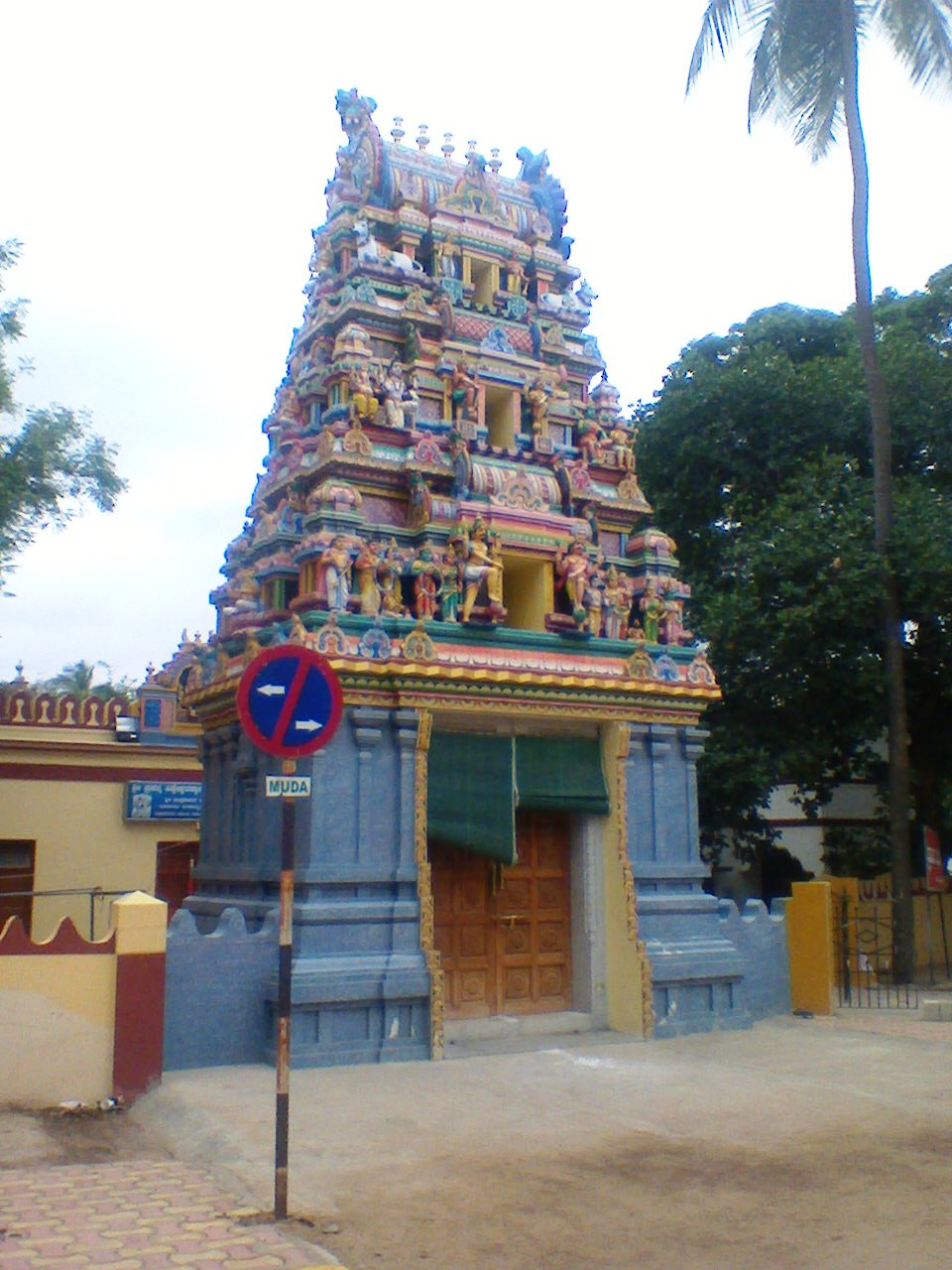
Anjaneya Temple

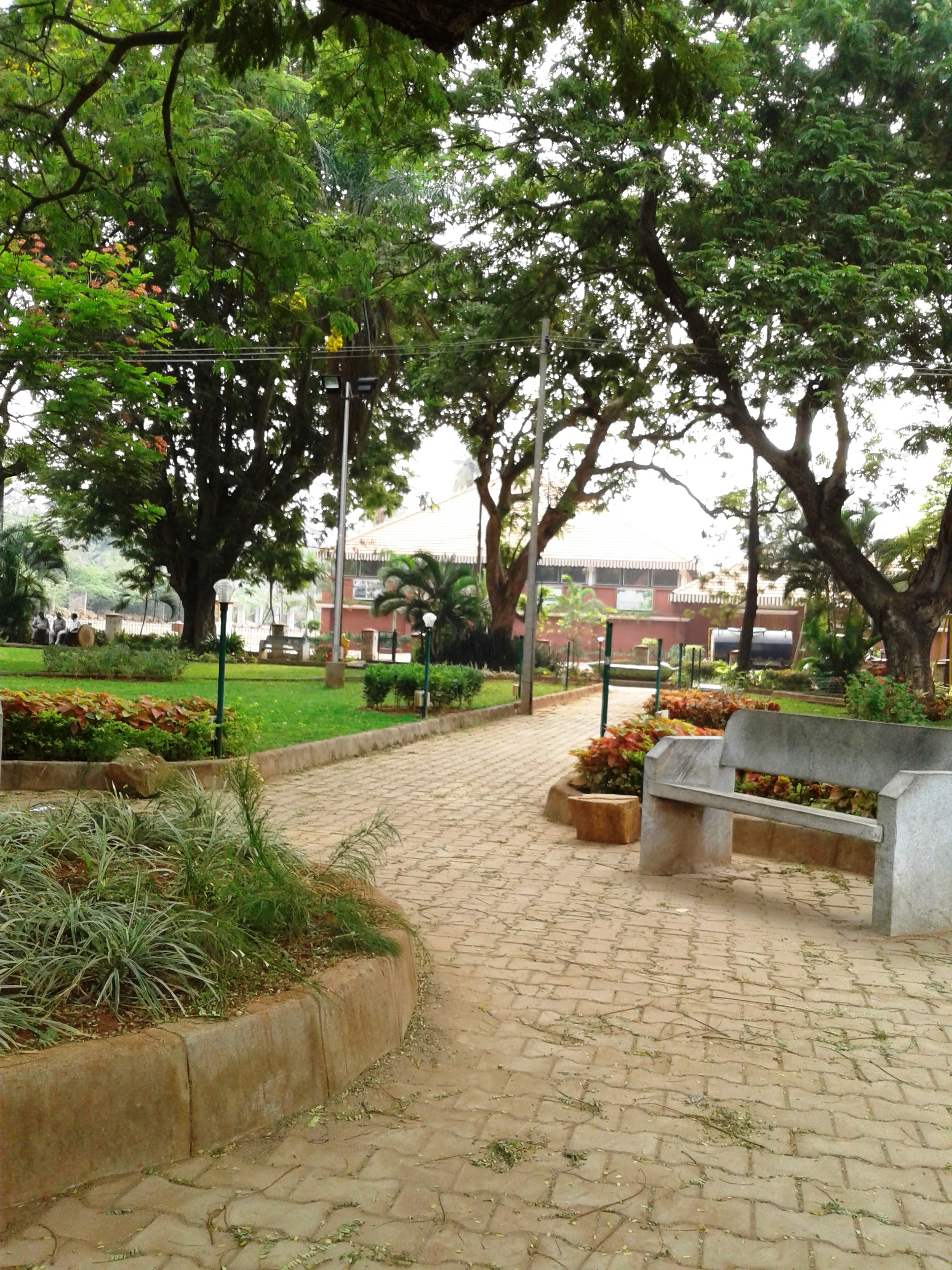
Ballal Park

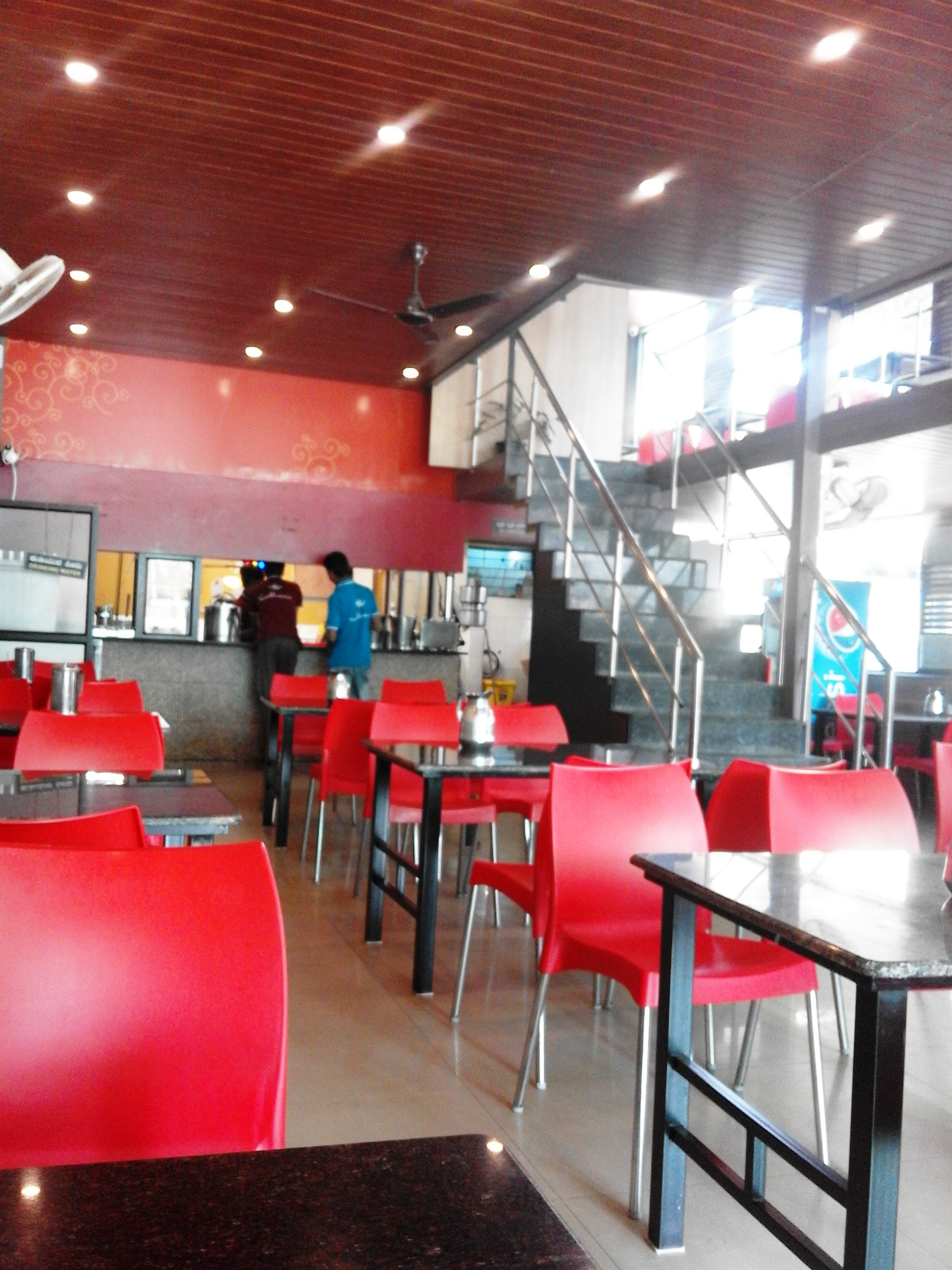
Sambhrama Restaurant

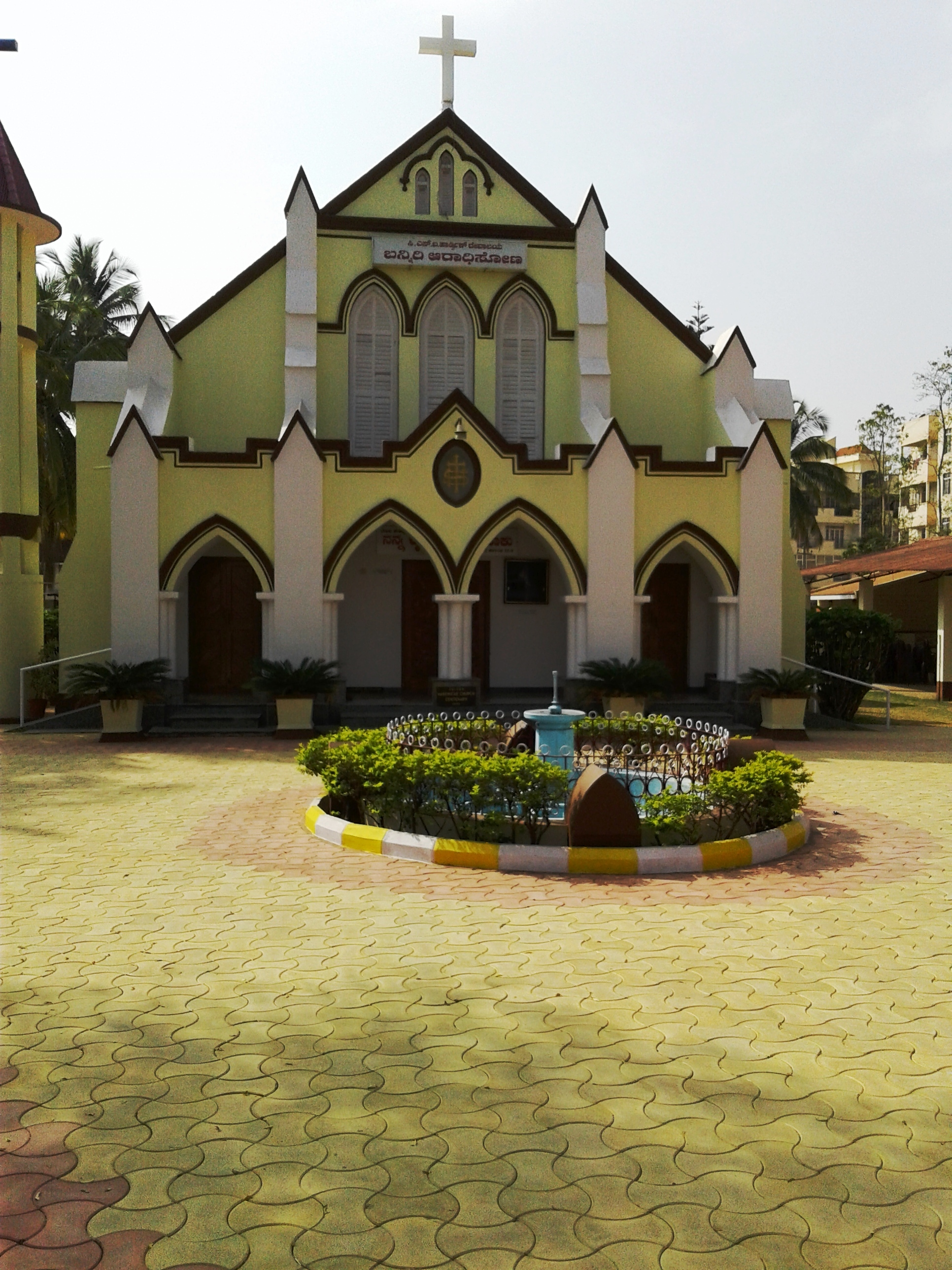
CSIKSD Church

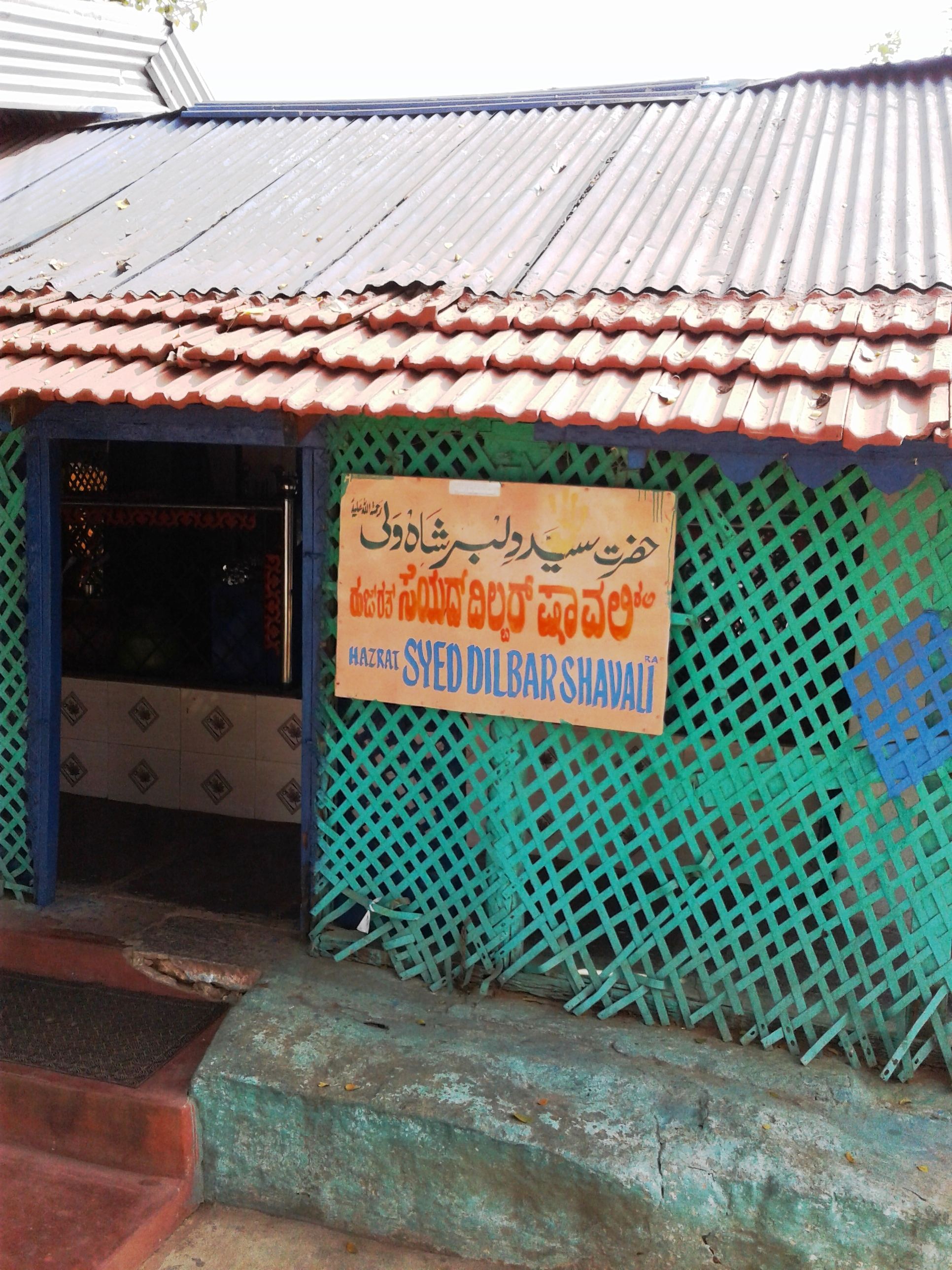
Gadichowk Dargah

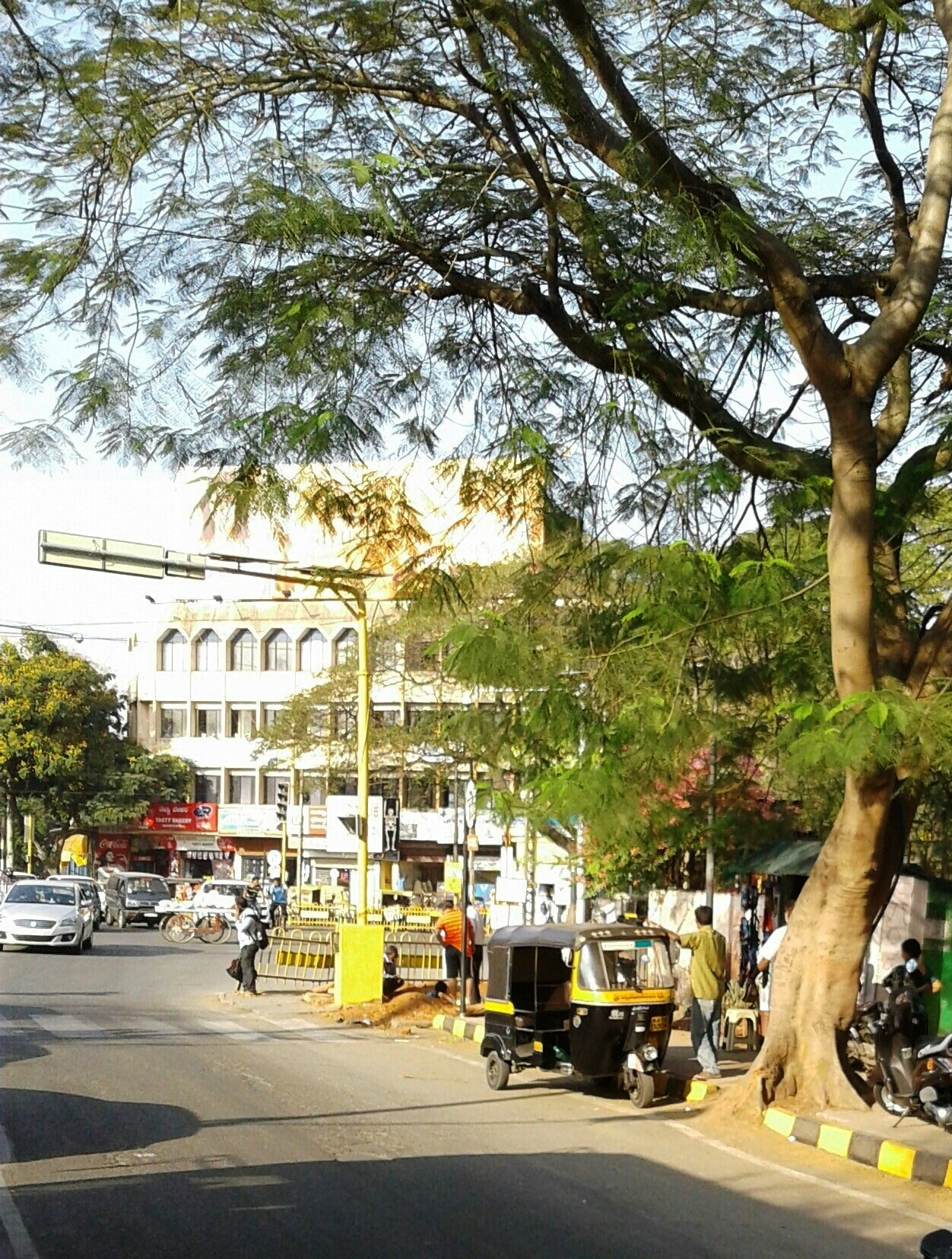
Ramaswamy Junction

== See also ==
- Krishnaraja Boulevard
- Chamarajapuram railway station
- Kuvempunagar
- Ramakrishna nagar
- Chamarajapuram, Mysore
