= University of Mysore =

State University in Karnataka

- Coat of arms of the University of Mysore
- Motto in English: Nothing is equal to knowledge
- Type: Public
- Established: 27 July 1916; 110 years ago
- Affiliations: UGC, NAAC, AIU
- Chancellor: Governor of Karnataka
- Vice-Chancellor: Lokanath N. K.
- Academic staff: 762
- Students: 10,946
- Undergraduates: 5,250
- Postgraduates: 3,623
- Doctoral students: 766
- Location: Mysuru, Karnataka, India; 12°18′29.45″N 76°38′18.83″E
- Campus: Urban
- Colours: Navy blue & white
- Website: www.uni-mysore.ac.in

The University of Mysore is a public state university in Mysore, Karnataka, India. The university was founded during the reign of Maharaja Krishnaraja Wadiyar IV and the premiership of Sir M. Visvesvaraya. The university is recognised by the University Grants Commission for offering higher studies degree courses on-campus as well as online. It was inaugurated on 27 July 1916. Its first chancellor was the maharaja himself; the first Vice-Chancellor was H. V. Nanjundaiah. This was the first university outside of British administered Indian provinces, the sixth in the Indian subcontinent as a whole, and the first in Karnataka. It is a state university of the affiliating type, and was deemed autonomous within the Republic of India on 3 March 1956, when it gained recognition from the University Grants Commission.

The Mysore University Library comprises over 800,000 books, 2,400 journal titles, and 100,000 volumes of journals. The main campus features an amphitheater, an auditorium, a swimming pool, and hostel accommodations for men and women. As of July 2013, the University of Mysore was accredited "Grade A" by National Assessment and Accreditation Council (NAAC).

== History ==
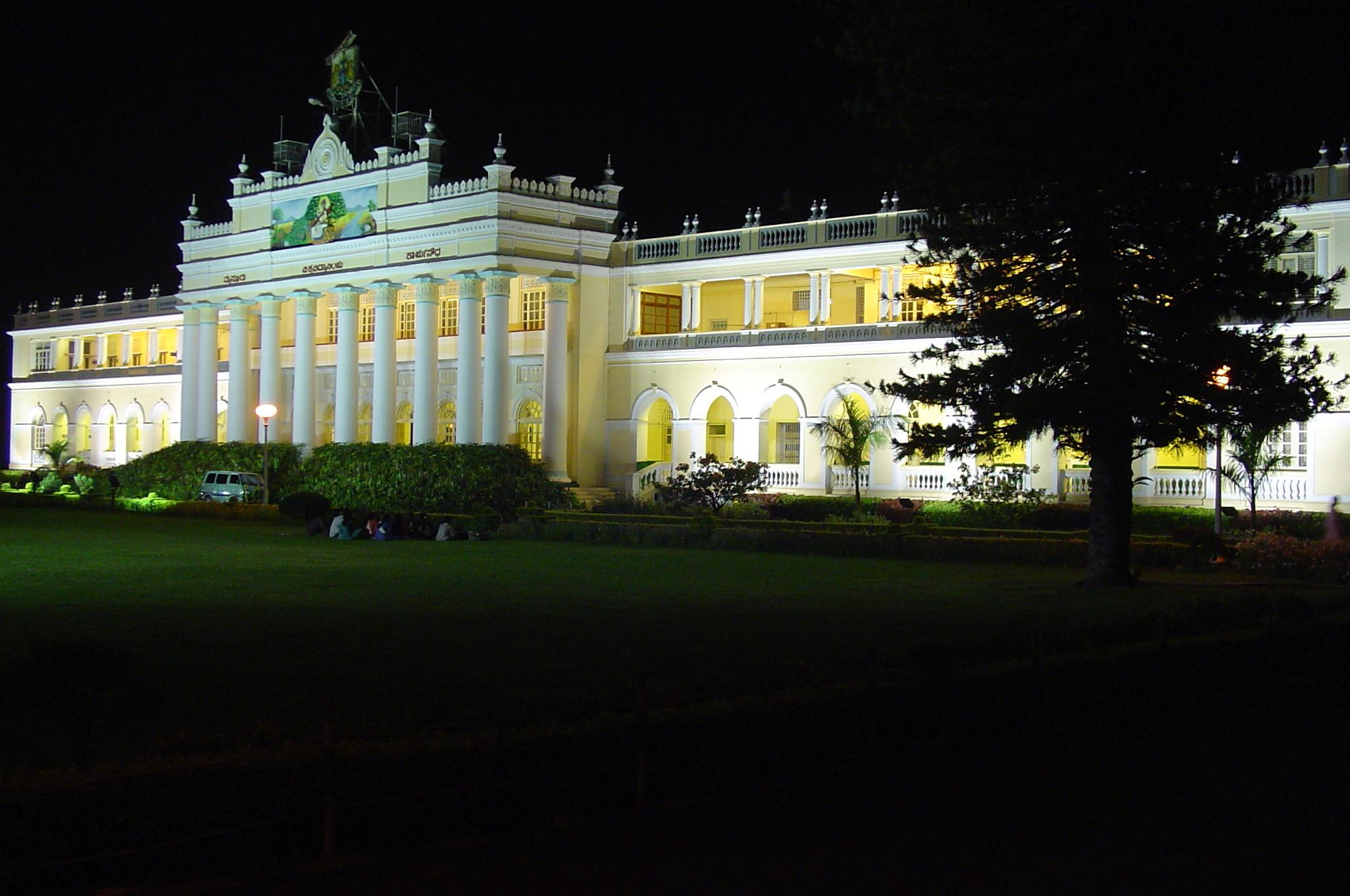
Crawford Hall, administrative complex of the University of Mysore

=== Recent academic restructuring ===
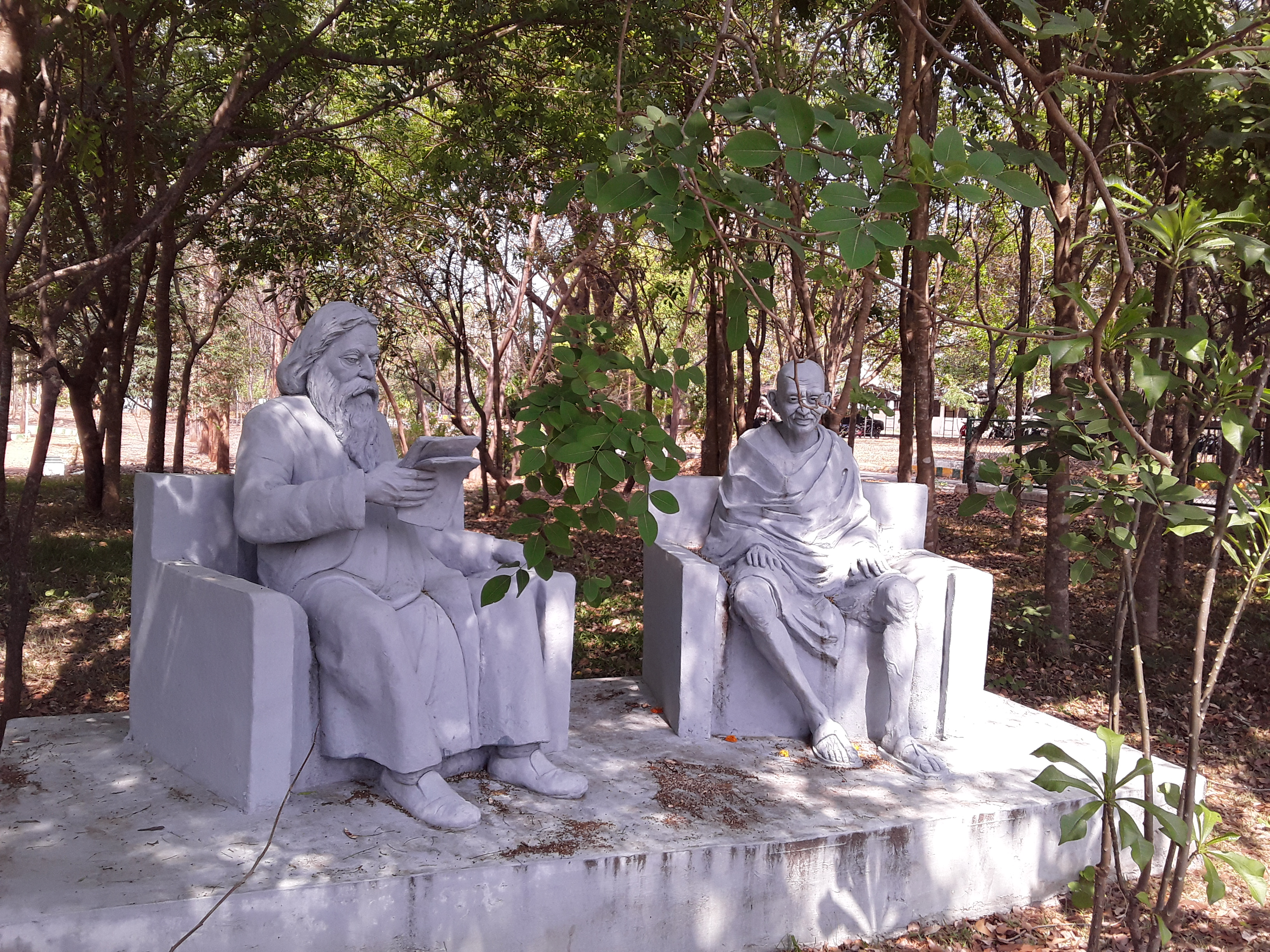
Statues of Tagore and Gandhi inside the campus

The International School of Information Management, was created in 2005 through the collaboration of three US universities, as well as Dalhousie University of Canada, and IIIT, Bangalore. Faculty members from these partnering institutions teach at ISiM.

The Third Sector Research Resource Centre (TSRRS) was established in 2004. The aim of the centre is '...to undertake and promote interdisciplinary [sic] studies and research in the domain of civil society,' with a secondary aim of developing and offering Diploma and Masters programs in the management of non-profit organisations.

More recently, the Department of Law in the university was incorporated into the Mysore University School of Justice (MUSJ). Continuing with the university's initiative to introduce five-year integrated courses to produce professionals with in-depth knowledge, the MUSJ has introduced a program leading to a degree in law, as a bid to enhance the quality of legal education in Karnataka. University of Mysore along with Institute of Astrophysics has signed an MoU to build a planetarium in Mysore.

== Crest and motto ==
The university's motto, "Na Hi Jñanena Sadrusham" (Nothing compares with knowledge) is taken from the Bhagavad Gita.

== Ranking ==
University rankings

General – India
- NIRF (Overall) (2024): 86
- NIRF (Universities) (2024): 54

Mysore University was ranked 54th among universities in India by the National Institutional Ranking Framework (NIRF) in 2024 and 86th overall.

== Notable people ==
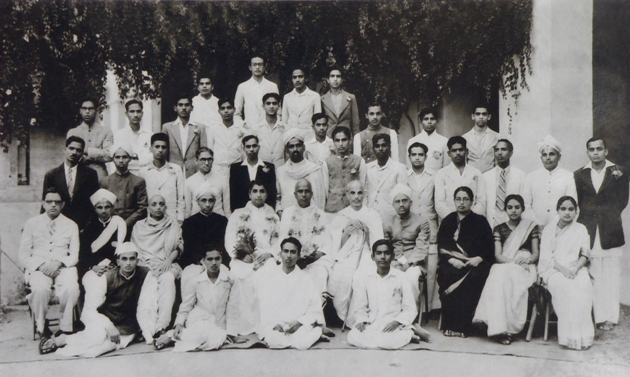
Group photograph of students of Maharaja's College (Class of 1929), featuring S. Srikanta Sastri, Kuvempu, AR Krishnashastry, RAK Sharma, and MV Seetharamaiah.

- Venkatraman Radhakrishnan, Physicist
- S. V. Rajendra Singh Babu, filmmaker
- T. S. Venkannayya, Kannada writer
- Sadhguru, Indian guru and founder of Isha Foundation
- A. R. Krishnashastry, writer, researcher and translator
- T. S. Krishnamurthy, former Chief Election Commissioner of India
- Kuvempu, writer
- R. K. Laxman, cartoonist
- Devanur Mahadeva, writer
- N. R. Narayana Murthy, billionaire
- Nima Poovaya-Smith, museum curator, art historian and writer
- M. Yamunacharya - Philosopher, Writer, Gandhian
- S. Srikanta Sastri, Indian historian, Indologist, and polyglot
- RAK Sharma, composer, singer and writer
- MV Seetharamaiah, writer
- G. S. Shivarudrappa, writer
- M. N. Venkatachaliah, former Chief Justice of India
- Priyadarshini, playback singer
- Mysore Manjunath, Indian Violinist
- Archna Sharma, Actress.
- George Njaralakatt, Archbishop of the Archeparchy of Tellicherry, theologian.
- Avinash, actor
- U. R. Ananthamurthy, writer
- Akhilesh Yadav, MP and former Chief Minister of Uttar Pradesh
- Arun Yogiraj, famous Indian sculptor.

== Online programs ==
The university launched several new online degree programs during the COVID pandemic, in an attempt to ensure students completing their school leaving exams in 2020–21 did not lose an academic year due to colleges and universities being in lockdown. Its programs were approved by the University Grants Commission (India) in early 2020 itself, making it one of the first public universities to try an initiative of this nature. The university had started projects in the field of online programs in 2014, partnering with University18 as a platform partner, making it an early adopter of technology in education.

Vice-Chancellors
- H. V. Nanjundaiah, 1916–1920
- Brajendra Nath Seal, 1921–1929
- E. P. Metcalfe, 1930–1937
- N. S. Subba Rao 1937–1942
- E. G. McAlpine, 1942–1944
- T. Singaravelu Mudaliar, 1944–1946
- M. Sultan Mohiyuddin, 1946–1948
- R. Kasturi Raj Chetty, 1948–1950
- B. L. Manjunath, 1950–1954
- V. L. D'Souza, 1954–1956
- K. V. Puttappa, 1956–1960
- N. A. Nikam, 1960–1962
- K. M. Panikkar, 1963–1964
- K. L. Shrimali, 1964–1969
- Javare Gowda, 1969–1975
- D. Vijaydevraj Urs, 1976–1979
- K. S. Hegde, 1979–1985
- Y. P. Rudrappa, 1985–1988
- P. Selvie Das, 1988–1991
- M. Madaiah, 1991–1997
- S. N. Hegde, 1997–2003
- Shashidhara Prasad, 2003–2007
- V. G. Talwar, 2009–2012
- K. S. Rangappa, 2013–2017
- Yashawanth Dongre, 2017
- Dayanand Mane, 2017
- C. Basavaraj, 2017–2018
- Ningamma. C. Betsur, 2018
- T. K. Umesh, 2018
- Aisha M. Sheriff, 2018
- G Hemantha Kumar, 2018–2024
- Lokanath N.K, 2024–present

== See also ==
- List of educational institutions in Mysore
- List of Heritage Buildings in Mysore
- Krishnaraja Boulevard
- Oriental Library
- Maharaja's College, Mysore
