= B. M. Srikantaiah =

Indian writer and translator (1884–1946)

Belluru Mylaraiyya Srikantaiah
- Born: Turuvekere, Kingdom of Mysore, British India
- Died: Bangalore, Kingdom of Mysore, British India
- Occupations: Poet, writer
- Relatives: Anasuya Shankar (niece); Aryamba Pattabhi (niece)
- Writing career
- Genre: Fiction
- Movement: Navodaya

Belluru Mylaraiah Srikantaiah (3 January 1884 – 5 January 1946), was an Indian author, writer and translator of Kannada literature. He was born in Sampige village of Turuvekere Taluk, his mother house and his father haled from Bellur in Nagamangala.

== Prominent Students ==
- V. Seetharamaiah
- K. V. Puttappa

== Works ==
- Gadayuddha Natakam (ಗದಾಯುದ್ಧ ನಾಟಕಂ) (play)
- Aswatthaaman (ಅಶ್ವತ್ಥಾಮನ್) (play)
- Honganasugalu (ಹೊಂಗನಸುಗಳು) (poetry)

== Translations ==
- English Geetegalu (ಇಂಗ್ಲಿಷ್ ಗೀತೆಗಳು) (English Songs, 1921)
- Karunalu Ba Belake (ಕರುಣಾಳು ಬಾ ಬೆಳಕೆ), a translation of John Henry Newman's hymn "Lead, Kindly Light"
- Kural (1940, Bangalore)

== Literary criticism ==
- Kannadigarige olleya saahitya (Good literature for Kannada People)
- Kannada Kaipidi (History of Kannada Literature)

== See also ==
- Kannada language
- Kannada literature
- Kannada poetry
