= Timeline of Karnataka =

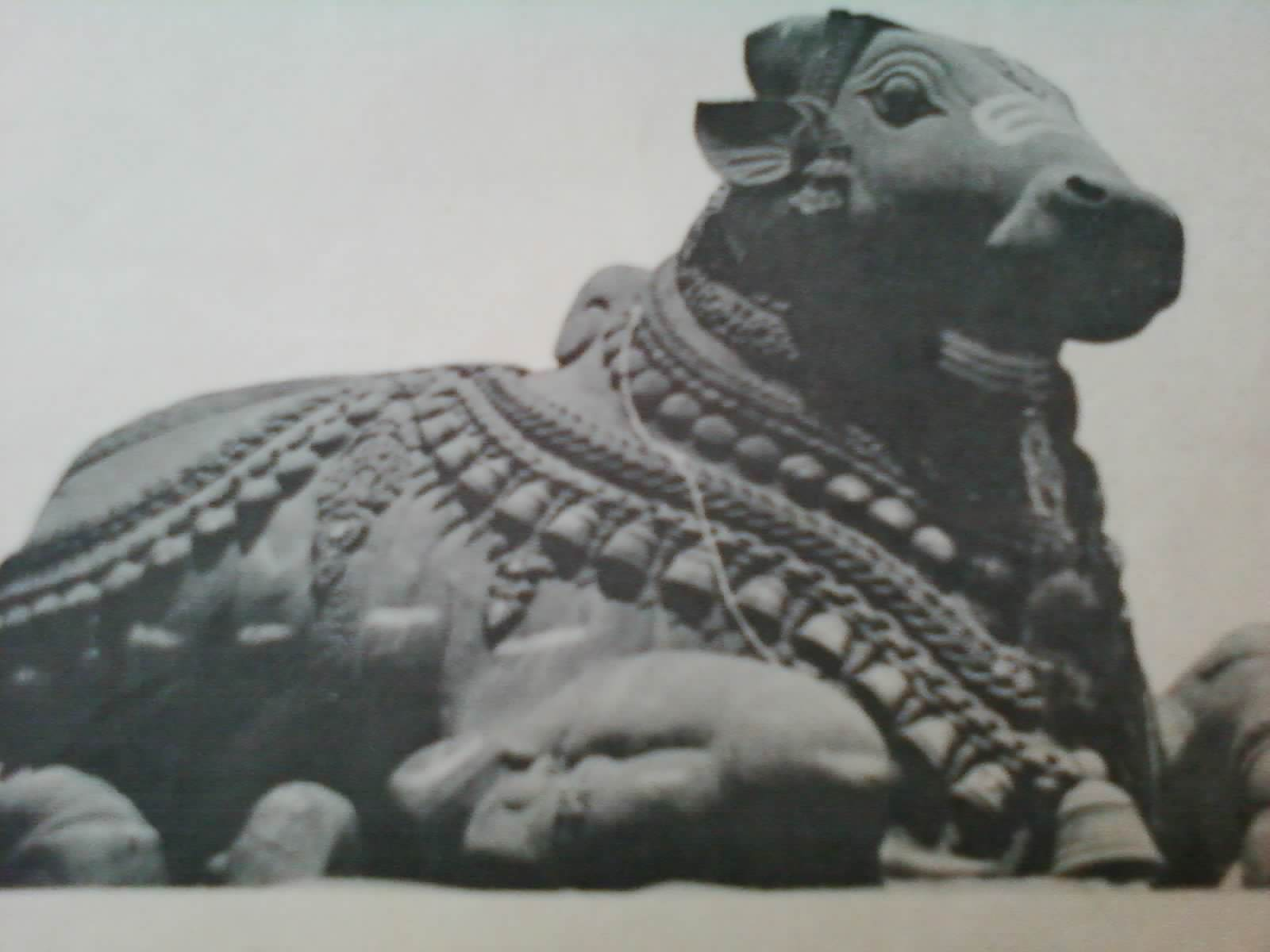
Nandi statue near Mysore

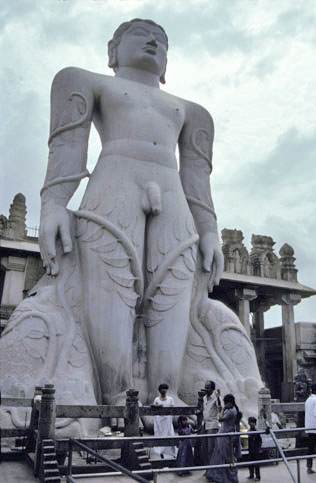
The Bahubali is the tallest monolith statue in the world and is 57 feet in height

The name Karnataka is derived from Karunadu, meaning 'lofty land' or 'high plateau', due to its location on the Deccan Plateau. The name can also mean 'land of black soil' (kari, 'black'; nadu, - 'area' or 'region') in Kannada. There are other possible roots of the name. The recorded history of Karnataka goes back to the Ramayana and Mahabharata epics. The capital of "Vaali" and "Sugriva" referenced in the Ramayana is said to be Hampi. Karnataka is mentioned in the Mahabharata as "Karnata Desha"." Historically, the region was also called "Kuntala Rajya".

Karnataka was also part of the Dakshinapatha (southern region) which is mentioned in many Indian epics. Vatapi, associated with the sage Agastya, is identified with Badami in Bagalkot district.

Karnataka is situated on the western edge of the Deccan Plateau. It neighbours Maharashtra and Goa to the north, Andhra Pradesh to the east, Telangana to the northeast, and Tamil Nadu and Kerala to the south. On the west, it opens out on the Arabian Sea.

== Prehistory ==
A Stanza in Kannada of Kavirajamarga praising people for their literary skills

During 4th and 3rd century BCE, Karnataka was part of Nanda and Maurya Empire. The Brahmagiri edicts in Chitradurga dated around c.230BCE belongs to emperor Ashoka and says of the nearby region as "Isila", which means "fortified region" in Sanskrit. In Kannada "Isila" can mean "To shoot an arrow" ("sila" or "sala" means to-shoot and "ise" or "ese" means to-throw in Kannada). After Maurya, Shatavahana came to power in the north and Ganga in the south which can roughly be taken as the starting point of Karnataka in modern times. Kavirajamarga by Amogavarsha states Karnataka as the region between the Kaveri River in the south and the Godavari River in the north. It also says "Kavya prayoga parinathamathigal" (See Image) which means people in the region are experts in poetry and literature.

== Starting period ==
Time Period / Era	Empire / Dynasty	Main Rulers	Empire Extent
Starting period	Shatavahana	Semukha / Gouthamiputhra	Deccan comprising present Andhra, Karnataka, Maharashtra

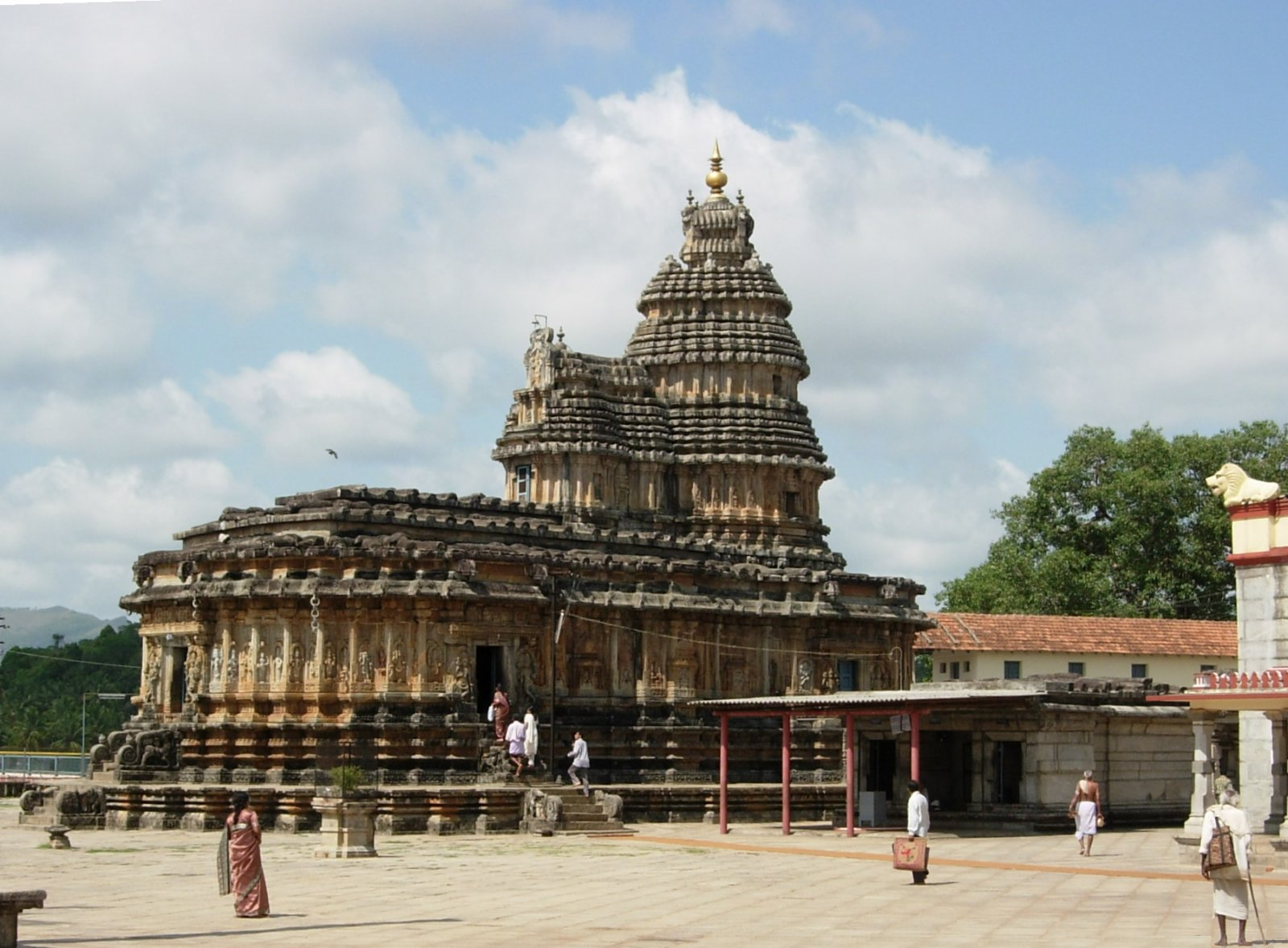
The Vidyashankara temple in Shringeri built during Vijaynagar times.

Around 3 BCE the Shatavahana came to power. The Shatavahanas ruled parts of northern Karnataka. They used Prakrit as the administrative language and they might belong to Karnataka. Semukha and Gouthamiputhra Shatakarni were important rulers. The empire lasted for almost 300 years. With the disintegration of Shatavahana Empire, the Kadambas came to the power in the north of Karnataka and the Gangas in the south.

== Banavasi Kadamba ==
Time Period / Era	Empire / Dynasty	Main Rulers	Empire Extent
A.D.325 - A.D.540	Banavasi Kadamba	Mayura Varma / Kakustha Varma	Central, Northern Karnataka, parts of Southern Maharashtra

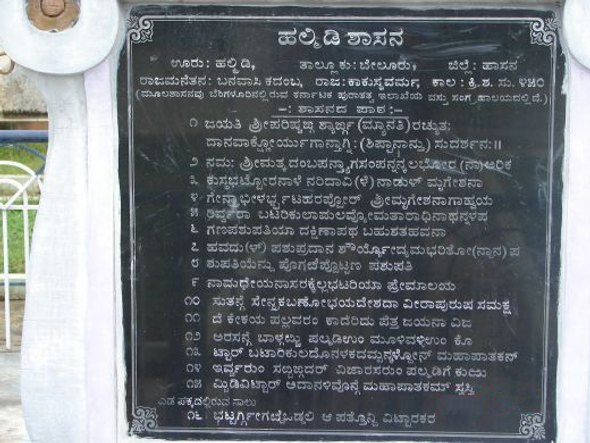
The Halmidi is the oldest available inscription in Kannada dated to c.450 CE

The Kadambas are considered the earliest indigenous rulers of Karnataka. Its founder was Mayuravarma and its most powerful ruler was Kakusthavarma. The Kadamba name is attributed to the Kadamba tree that was grown near the place where the empire was founded. Kadambas ruled for almost 200 years before Chalukyas took over their empire, but some minor branches of Kadambas ruled Hanagal, Goa and other regions till the 14th century. The details about this old empire are available through inscriptions like Chandravalli, Chandragiri, Halmidi, Talagunda etc.

== Gangas of Talakadu ==
Time Period / Era	Empire / Dynasty	Main Rulers	Empire Extent
CE.325 - CE.999	Gangas of Talakadu	Avanitha / Durvinitha / Ratchamalla	South Karnataka / parts of Andhra and Tamil Nadu

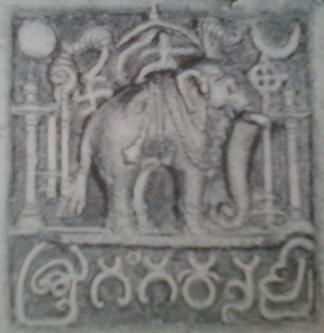
The Ganga Emblem - 10th century copper plate

The Gangas first ruled from Nandagiri and then from Talakadu. They were patrons of Jain and Hindu religions. They were also instrumental in laying a strong foundation for the flourishing and development of Kannada literature. They ruled for almost 700 years. During their peak period, the empire included Kodaugu, Tumkur, Bangalore, Mysore districts, parts of Andhra and Tamil Nadu. Durvinitha, Shripurusha and Ratchamalla were famous rulers. The most famous example of Ganga architecture is the Gomateshwara in Shravanabelagola built in c. 983 CE by the Ganga minister "Chavundaraya". The statue is carved out of a single monolith rock and measures 57 feet high. This is the tallest monolith statue in the world, and is so perfect that the fingers of the hand are cut up slightly as a mark of induced imperfection (Drushti Nevarane in Kannada). The statue is naked, and shows the beauty of the human in that form. The statue is the first of its kind in Karnataka and comparable statues were not produced thereafter.

== Chalukyas of Badami ==
Time Period / Era	Empire / Dynasty	Main Rulers	Empire Extent
CE.500 - CE.757	Chalukyas of Badami	Pulakeshi II (Immadi Pulakeshi)/ Vikramaditya II	Most of Karnataka and Maharashtra, large parts of Andhra Pradesh, parts of Madhya Pradesh, Gujarat, Orissa

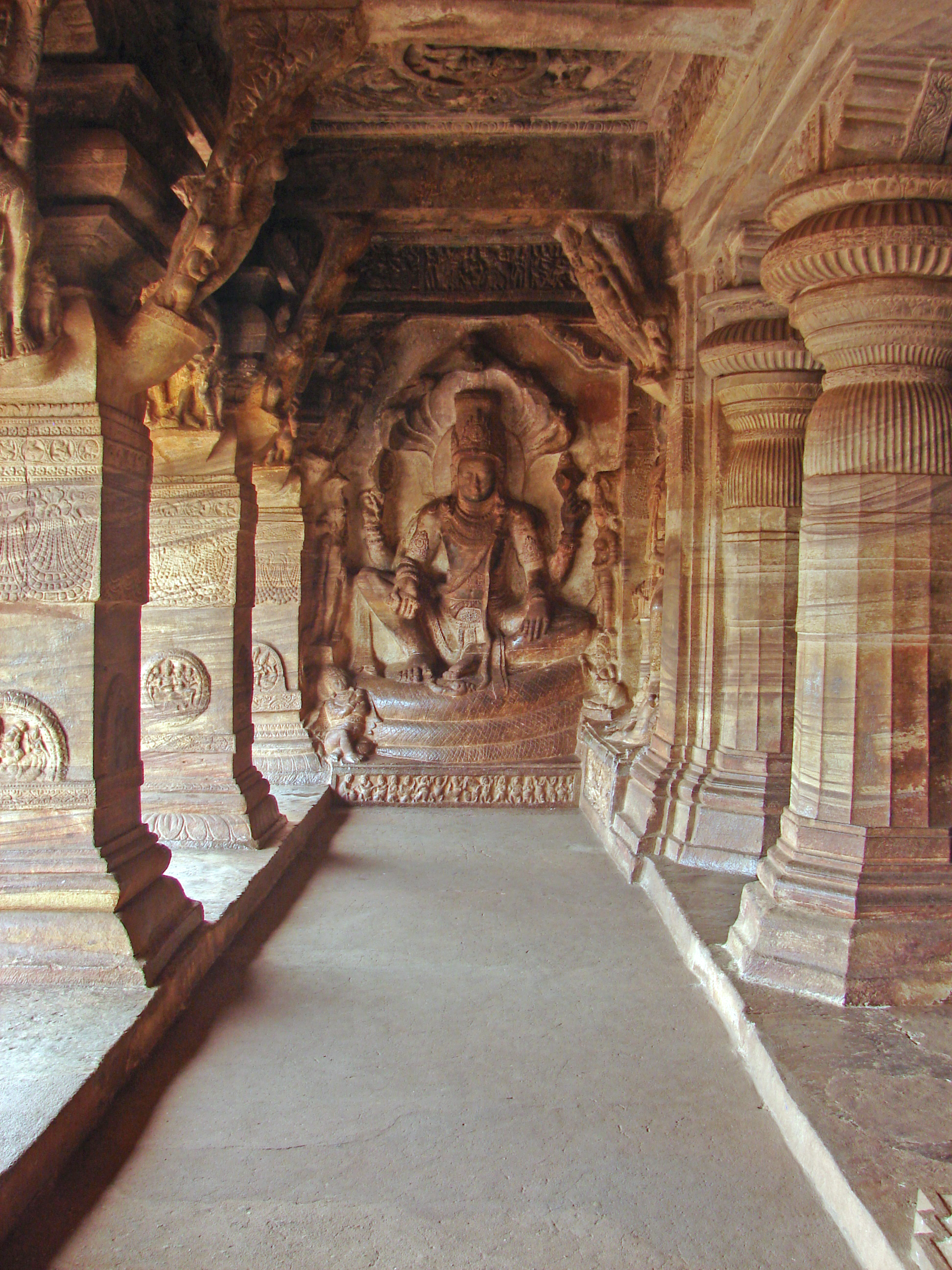
Cave 3 in the Badami cave temples is constructed by carving large rock structure and an example of Chalukya architecture.

The Chalukya empire was established by Pulakeshi. His son Kirttivarma I consolidated and strengthened the empire. Mangalesha who was a powerful ruler extended the empire. The name "Chalukya" has no definite meaning. According to legend, the brave man who was born out of god Brahma's Cheluka (a type of vessel) was named Chalukya. They were patrons of deity Vishnu. The most famous ruler was Pulakeshin II (c. 610 CE - c. 642 CE). He was having the title of "Satyasherya Parameshwara" and "Dakshina Patheshwarya" because he defeated most of the southern and northern rulers Harshavardhana of Kanouj. During his rule, the empire extended up to the south of Karnataka and included the whole of western India (i.e. Gujarat, Maharashtra). Later victories also brought the eastern portions (Orissa, Andhra) into his rule. Chinese traveller Xuanzang visited his court and called the empire "Maholocha" (Maharashtra). His description included Pulakeshin II's personal details and military techniques that were employed. An artistic picture in Ajanta depicts the arrival of the representative of Persian emperor Kusru 2nd to his kingdom. Pulakeshin II was finally defeated by Pallava ruler Narasimhavarma who occupied Badami and called himself "Vatapikonda", which literally means "The one who won Badami". The end of Pulakeshi II remains a mystery. But the empire could last up to 757 CE. Their contribution to architecture includes cave temples of Badami, Aihole, Pattadakal, Mahakoota, etc.

== Rastrakuta of Manyakheta ==
Time Period / Era	Empire / Dynasty	Main Rulers	Empire Extent
CE.757 - CE.973	Rastrakuta of Manyakheta (modern Malkhed)	Druva Dharavarsha / Krishna I / Govinda III / Nrupatunga Amoghavarsha I / Indra IV / Krishna III	All of Karnataka and Maharashtra, large parts of Andhra Pradesh, Tamil Nadu, Madhyapradash, extended to Kannauj at their peak.

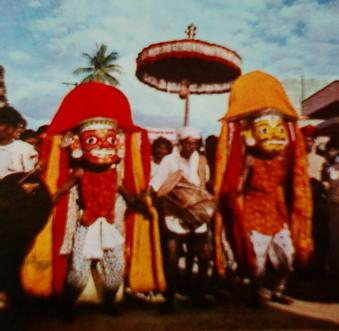
The Janapada Art of "Somana Kunitha".

The name Rastrakuta is a formal title like Patela, Gowda, Hegade, Reddy etc. Dantidurga and his son Krishna overtook the empire from Chalukyas and built a powerful empire on it. During the rule of Govinda, the empire became more powerful all over the south and the north. His son Nrupatunga Amogavarsha got immortalised as "Kavichakravarthi" due to the work of Kavirajamarga. In c. 914 CE Arab traveller Hassan-al-Masood visited the empire. The 10th century was a golden age for the literature of Kannada. The famous poet "Pampa" was in the court of Arikesari who was a feudatory to Rastrakutas. Adikavi Pampa popularised the "Champu" style through the epic "Vikramarjuna Vijaya". Other famous poets who lived in this period are Ponna, Ranna, etc. among others. During c. 973 CE Taila 2nd of Chalukya defeated the Rastrakutas after a prolonged battle taking advantage of Karka 2nd's (the last ruler of Rastrakutas) weakness. The world-famous Kailash Temple at Ellora is an excellent example of their architecture.

== Chalukyas of Kalyana ==
Time Period / Era	Empire / Dynasty	Main Rulers	Empire Extent
CE.973 - CE.1198	Chalukyas of Kalyana	Vikramadithya VI	Entire Karnataka and Maharashtra, large areas in Andhra Pradesh, parts of Tamil Nadu and Madhya Pradesh while at their peak

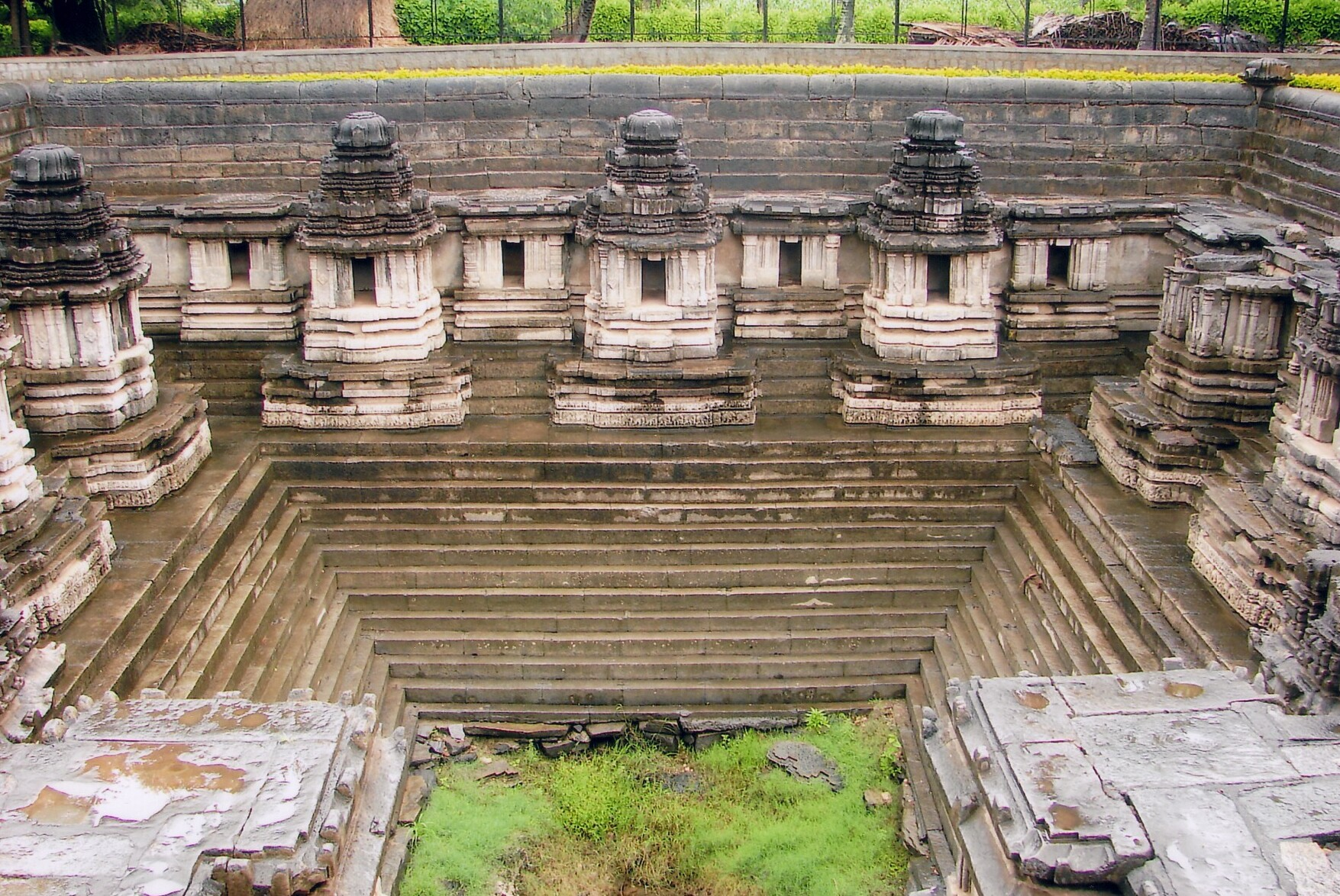
Hoysala stepped temple tank (Kalyani) at Hulikere, Karnataka

After the Rastrakutha came to the Chalukya who ruled from Kalyana. The most famous among them was Vikramadithya 6th. He was responsible for the setting of a new era called "Vikrama shaka". An important event that took place during this period (c. 1150 CE) is the social and religious movement of Basaveshwara who was in the court of Bijjala. The literature that flourished under Basaveshwara, Allamaprabhu, Channabasavanna and Akkamahadevi during this period gave rise to "Vachanna" in Nadugannada (middle Kannada) which was simple to understand, elegant and effective in reaching the people. The Vachanna form of literature was instrumental in removing the Sanskrit influence to a large extent and thus popularised Kannada as an effective language for literature. The Kashmiri poet Bilhana came to his court and lived there. He wrote "vikramankadevacharita" praising Vikramaditya 6th. The Kalachurya took over their empire and ruled for about 20 years but were ineffective to see the integrity of the empire. Thus the empire got broke up which was shared by Sevunas in the north and Hoysalas in the south.

== Sevunas of Devagiri ==
Time Period / Era	Empire / Dynasty	Main Rulers	Empire Extent
CE.1198 - CE.1312	Sevunas of Devagiri	Singana II	Northern Karnataka, most of Maharashtra, and parts of Andhra Pradesh

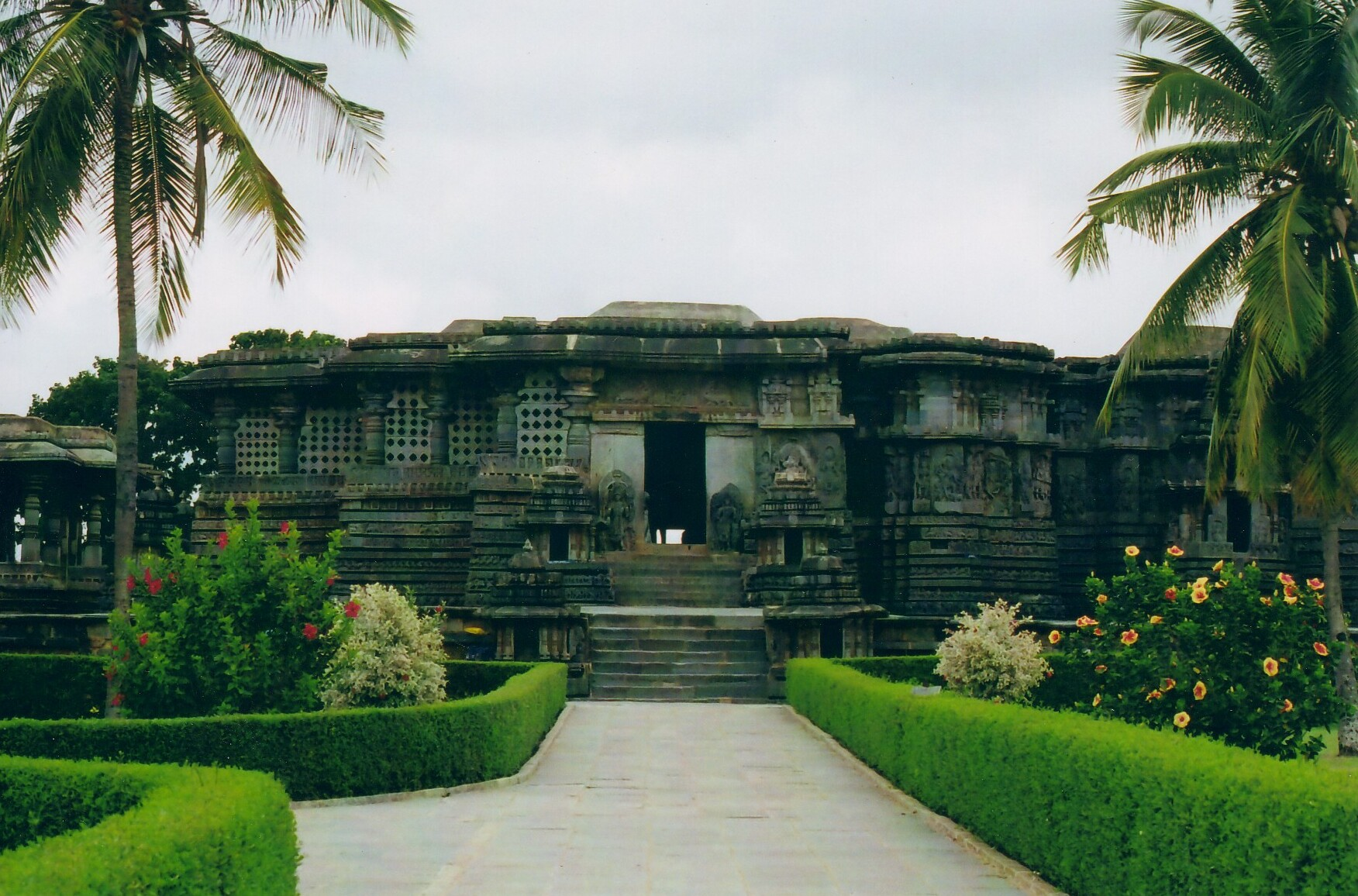
The Hoysaleswara Temple in Halebidu

The Sevunas were from Nasik and came to power during 835 CE. They ruled parts of Deccan and very small parts of Karnataka until the beginning of the 12th century, with Devagiri as the capital. Singana II was the main ruler and during his reign, most of the empire experienced stability that could not be maintained thereafter. They were constantly at war with Hoysalas and other rulers and fell to Delhi Sultan Alauddin Khilji and his general Malik Kafur.

== Hoysalas of Dwarasamudra ==
Time Period / Era	Empire / Dynasty	Main Rulers	Empire Extent
CE.1000 - CE.1346	Hoysalas of Dwarasamudra	Vishnuvardhana / Ballala II	Southern Karnataka including the coast, parts of Andhra Pradesh and Tamil Nadu

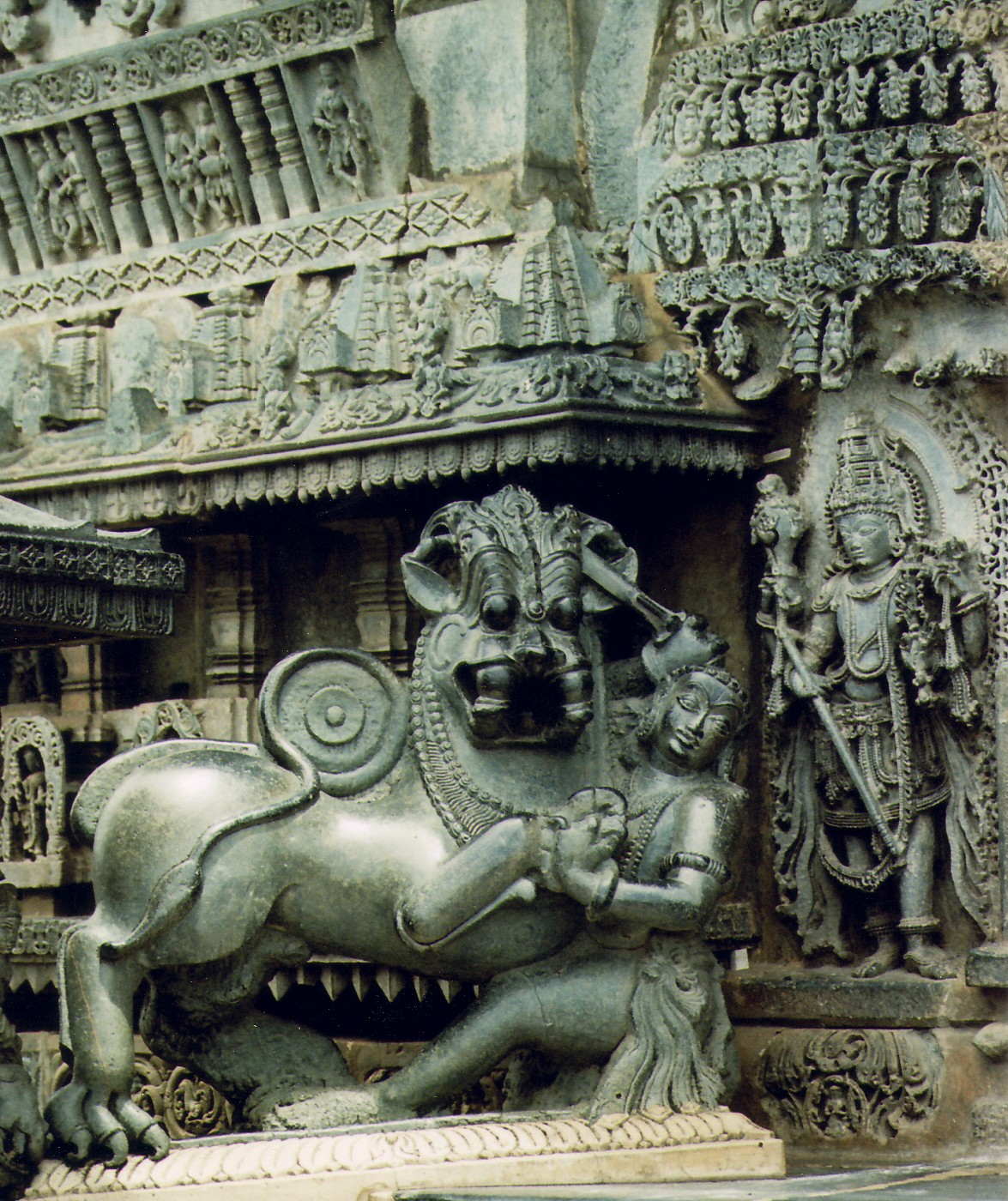
The Hoysala royal emblem at the Chennakesava Temple in Belur

The Hoysalas were famous for their architecture. The empire was founded by the legendary person "Sala", who hailed from the village of Sosavur (present-day Angadi in Chikkamagalur). Once, he accompanied his teacher Sudatta to the temple of Vasantika, but, a tiger came in their way and tried to attack them. The master threw a "Khatari" (knife) and exclaimed "Hoy Sala (Hit, Sala)" and he obediently agreed and mauled the tiger, killing it. Sudatta blessed him and said that he would establish a mighty empire. The emblem of Hoysala depicts Sala fighting with the tiger. Some people interpret that the man represents Hoysala and tiger represents the Cholas (tiger being their emblem), while this represents the Hoysala's victory over Cholas in Talakkad. This legend is also depicted in their royal emblem and found in many inscriptions and in front of Belur temple. The Hoysalas were patrons of Jain religion but also respected all religions. During the 8th Century CE, the famous philosopher Adi Shankaracharya established Dakshinamnaya Sharada Peetha at Sringeri in Chikamagalur and gave impetus to the Vidheka (Hindu) religion. The famous philosopher Ramanujacharya established the Cheluvanarayana Temple in Yadugiri (now Melukote, near Mysore). The famous Hoysala king Bittideva (also called Bittiga) was influenced by Ramanujacharya and got converted to Hindu, changing his name to Vishnuvardhana.

The world-famous Chennakeshava Temple, Belur, Hoysaleshwara Temple, Halebid and Chennakeshava Temple, Somanathpura are examples of their architecture. After Veera Ballala III's death in a battle at Madurai, the Hoysala Dynasty came to an end. The famous expert in epigraphy Mr. Furgusen described the architecture of "Hoysaleshwara" temple as exceeding the art of any Gothic architecture. Some European critics compare Hoysala architecture at Halebid with the Parthenon in Athens, Greece.

== Vijayanagara ==
Time Period / Era	Empire / Dynasty	Main Rulers	Empire Extent
CE.1336 - CE.1565	Vijayanagara	Devaraya II / Krishnadevaraya	The whole of South India, encompassing present-day states of Kerala, Tamil Nadu, Andhra Pradesh, Karnataka and Telangana, along with parts of Orissa and Maharashtra

The Stone Chariot near Vittala temple in Hampi

The Vijayanagara empire was founded by the duo Harihara and Bukka. The empire was established during tough times when Kakatiyas of Warangal and King Kampili of Kummatadurga were killed and their dynasties uprooted by the Delhi Sultanate. The feeble Hoysala emperor Veera Ballala III desperately fought from Tiruvannamalai and finally succumbed in a battle at Madurai. At such a time, Hakka and Bukka, under the spiritual guidance of Vidyaranya, found a rabbit trying to shoo off hunting dogs. Hence, in 1336 CE, they built a city and named it Vidyanagara at first (in memory of Vidyaranya), but changed it into Vijayanagara. Hakka assumed the name of Harihara Raya I and due to his work, the empire got firmly established in 1346 CE. He subdued the Madurai Sultanate and helped in bringing back the idol of Sri Ranganatha of Srirangam, that had been shifted to Tirupati during an attack by Delhi Sultanate. His brother Bukka succeeded him, assuming the name of Bukka Raya I. His successors were able administrators and were successful in blocking Muslim invasion in South India for about 300 years. Italian, Portuguese and Persian visitors (Parsee, Kantae, Abdul Razak) described the Vijayanagar capital Hampi as equivalent to Rome in those days. Krishnadevaraya was the most famous ruler of the empire . After his death in 1530, internal feuds arose in the royal family. There was no one to hold the empire stably and crush the rebellions of the vassals. Seeking advantage of this, the Berar Sultanate, and Sultans of Bijapur, Bidar, Golconda and Ahmadnagar defeated the forces of Aliya Rama Raya in the battle of Talikota in c. 1565 CE. These Sultans also sacked Hampi. The Stone Chariot of Vijaya Vitthala Temple (in Hampi) is an excellent example of Vijayanagar architecture.

== Bahamani ==
Time Period / Era	Empire / Dynasty	Main Rulers	Empire Extent
CE.1347 - CE.1527	Bahumani Sultanate	Muhammadshah I / II	Deccan area comprising northern Karnataka and Andhra

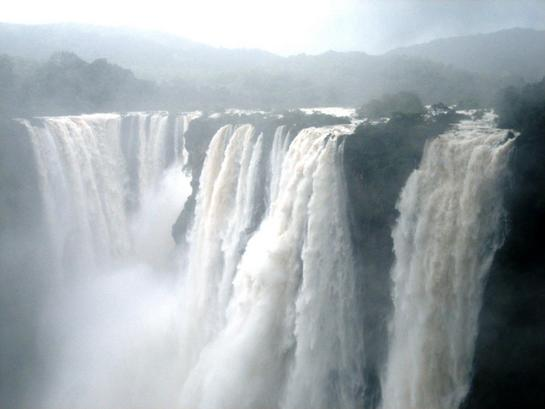
The Jog Falls measures 857 feet in height and an important source of electricity in the region.

The Bahumani empire was established due to the conquest of the Muslim rulers in south India. The Muslim raids were so intense that in almost two attacks, four empires of the south were destroyed (Devagiri in c. 1318 CE, Varangal of Andhra in c. 1323 CE, Pandya of Tamil Nadu in c. 1330 CE, and partially Hoysala). But Hoysala Ballala shifted his capital to Tiruvannamalai and continued his fight. Amir Hassan from Persia called himself as Bahamani and established the Bahamani kingdom. Muhammad Shah was an able ruler and strengthened the empire. The empire occupied large chunks of Maharashtra and also parts of Telangana, Andhra Pradesh and Karnataka (Bijapur, Bidar, Gulbarga area) Muhammad Gawan was the most famous minister under the Bahumans. They ruled from Bidar. Russian traveller Nikiten visited the empire in c. 1470 CE and described Bidar as a beautiful city.

== Sultans of Bijapur ==
Time Period / Era	Empire / Dynasty	Main Rulers	Empire Extent
CE.1490 - CE.1686	Sultans of Bijapur	Yusaf Addil Khan / Ibrahim Addil Shah II	Bijapur and adjoining areas

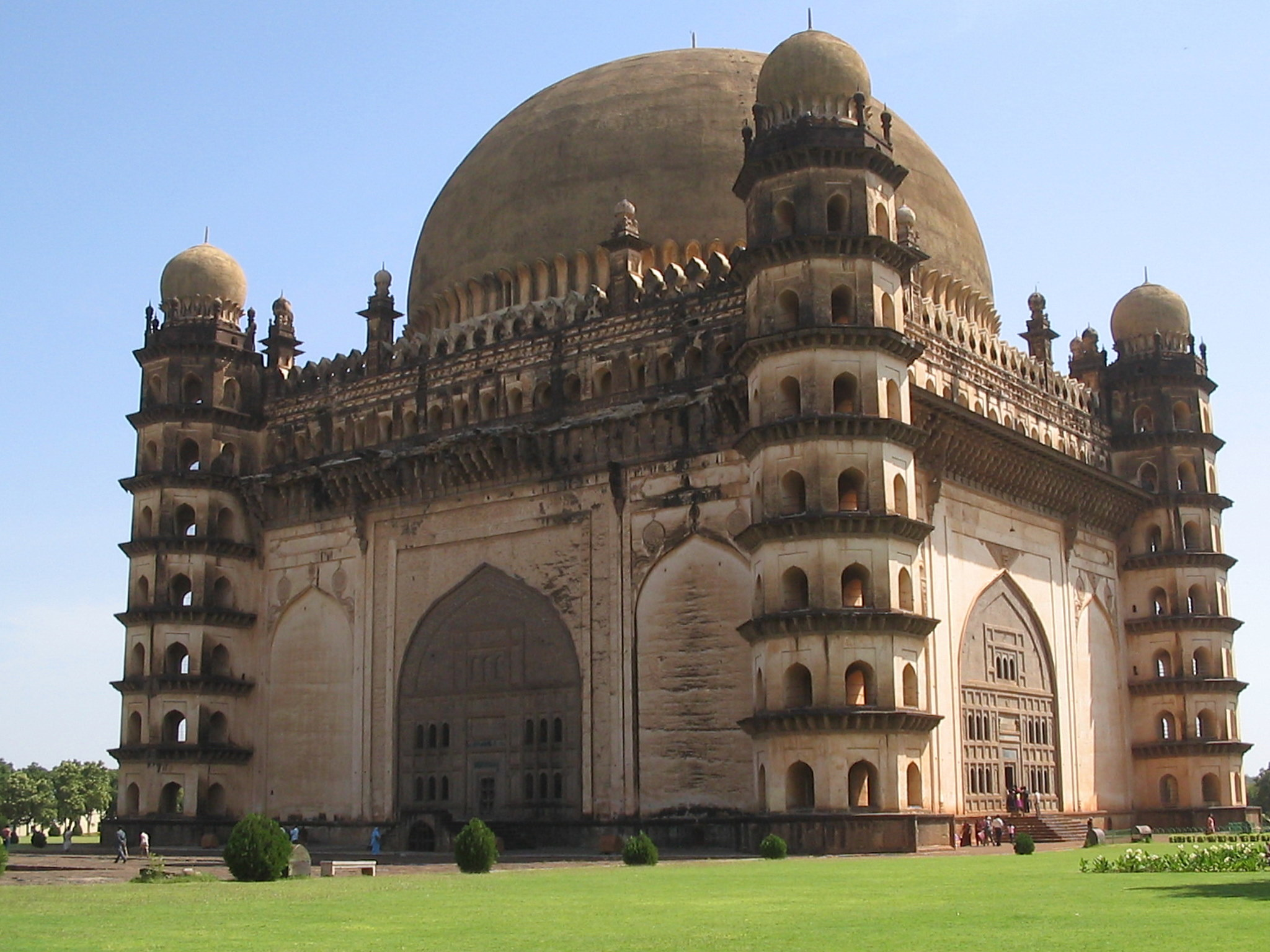
The Gol Gumbaz in Bijapur

Around c. 1490 CE the empire broke into five parts, of which Bidar and Bijapur belong to Karnataka. The other kingdoms are Berar, Ahmadnagar and Golconda. Muhammad Ibrahim Adil Shah built the famous Gol Gumbaz in Bijapur. Muslim architecture flourished under their reign but many remained uncompleted. Farista who was in the court of Ibrahim II compiled an encyclopedia called "Najumal-Ullum" (star of scientists) which contained much arts of southern style. The Mughals, under Aurangzeb finally defeated Sikandar Adil Shah in 1686, while the erstwhile Sultan was imprisoned in Daulatabad Fort, where he died in 1686, ending the Adil Shahi Dynasty.

== Nayakas of Keladi ==
Time Period / Era	Empire / Dynasty	Main Rulers	Empire Extent
CE.1500 - CE.1763	Nayakas of Keladi	Shivappa Nayaka / Rani Channama	Coastal and Central Karnataka

The Nayakas of Keladi ruled the Malnad and Karavali (west coast) regions during the Vijayanagar reign. They successfully repelled the Portuguese and Bijapur sultans. They carried forward the principles and traditions of Hindu religion after the demise of the Vijayanagar empire. During its peak, the kingdom stretched from Banavasi (in Uttara Kannada) to Kannur (in Kerala) and the West Coast to Sakkarepattana (in Kodagu), and included present-day districts of Udupi, Dakshina Kannada, Uttara Kannada, Shimoga, Chikkamagalur, Hassan and parts of Kodagu. The most famous among them was Shivappa Nayaka, who had excellent military and administrative skills. He sheltered Tirumala Nayaka of Vijayanagara from the Bijapur Sultans. He was famous for his taxation and agricultural systems. His land taxation system is famous as "Shivappanayakana Shisthu" (Discipline of Shivappanayaka). An important queen was Keladi Chennamma. She was one of the first Indian rulers to defy and defeat the Mughal hordes of Aurangzeb. While sheltering Shivaji's son Rajaram, she employed guerilla warfare and fought with Aurangzeb's forces. The Mughal emperor himself had to sue for peace with her. She is immortalised in Kannada traditional (janapada) songs. Later, during the reign of Rani Veerammaji, Hyder Ali of Mysore occupied their kingdom and imprisoned her in Madhugiri.

== Wodeyars of Mysore ==
Time Period / Era	Empire / Dynasty	Main Rulers	Empire Extent
CE.1399 - CE.1761	Wodeyars of Mysore	Ranadhira Kantirava / Chikkadevaraja	Southern Karnataka, parts of northern Tamil Nadu

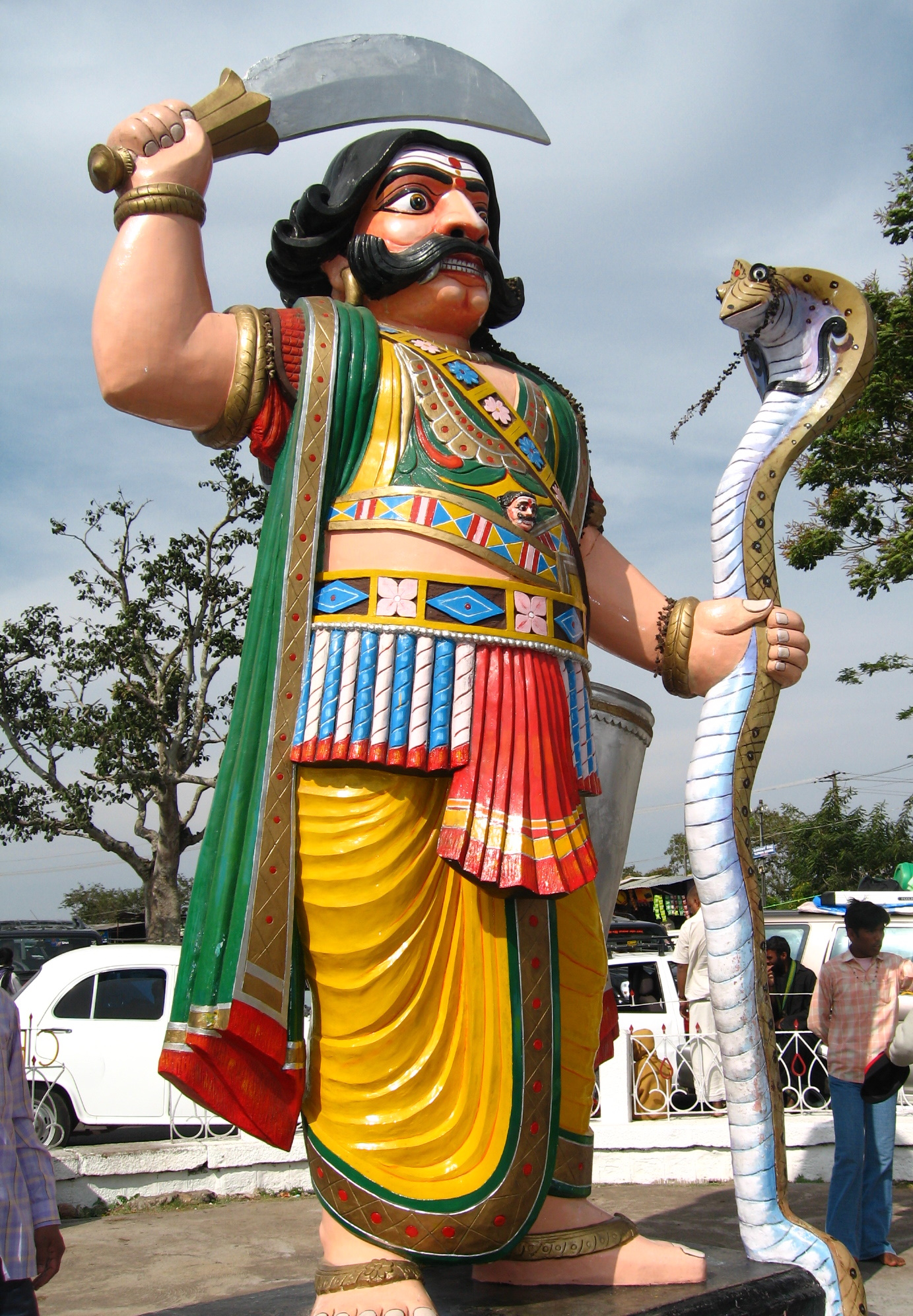
Statue of Mahishasura

The Yeduraya and Krishnadeva of Yadava clan who came from Dwaraka to Mysore were approached for help to contain Marappanayaka. They defeated and killed him. His heir was married to Yeduraya and he came to crown in c.1399 CE. Mysore was previously called "MahishaMandala" which means the region of demon Mahisha. The demon was killed by a goddess in this region and hence got the name Mysore. The small kingdom was made into a mighty empire by RajaWodeyar. They shifted their capital from Mysore to Srirangapattana. Chikkadevaraja. Wodeyar is the most famous ruler among them and got the title "Karnataka Chakravarthy" by defeating Nayakas (Ikkeri), Sultans (Madurai) and Shivaji. By 1686 CE the kingdom included almost all of south India. In 1687 CE they bought the city of Bangalore from Mughal by paying three lakh Rupees. By 1761 CE Hyder Ali who was a normal soldier took over their empire.

== Sultanate of Srirangapattana ==
Time Period / Era	Empire / Dynasty	Main Rulers	Empire Extent
CE.1761 - CE.1799	Sultanate of Srirangapattana	HyderAli / Tippu Sultan	Most of Karnataka, parts Andhra Pradesh Tamil Nadu and Kerala

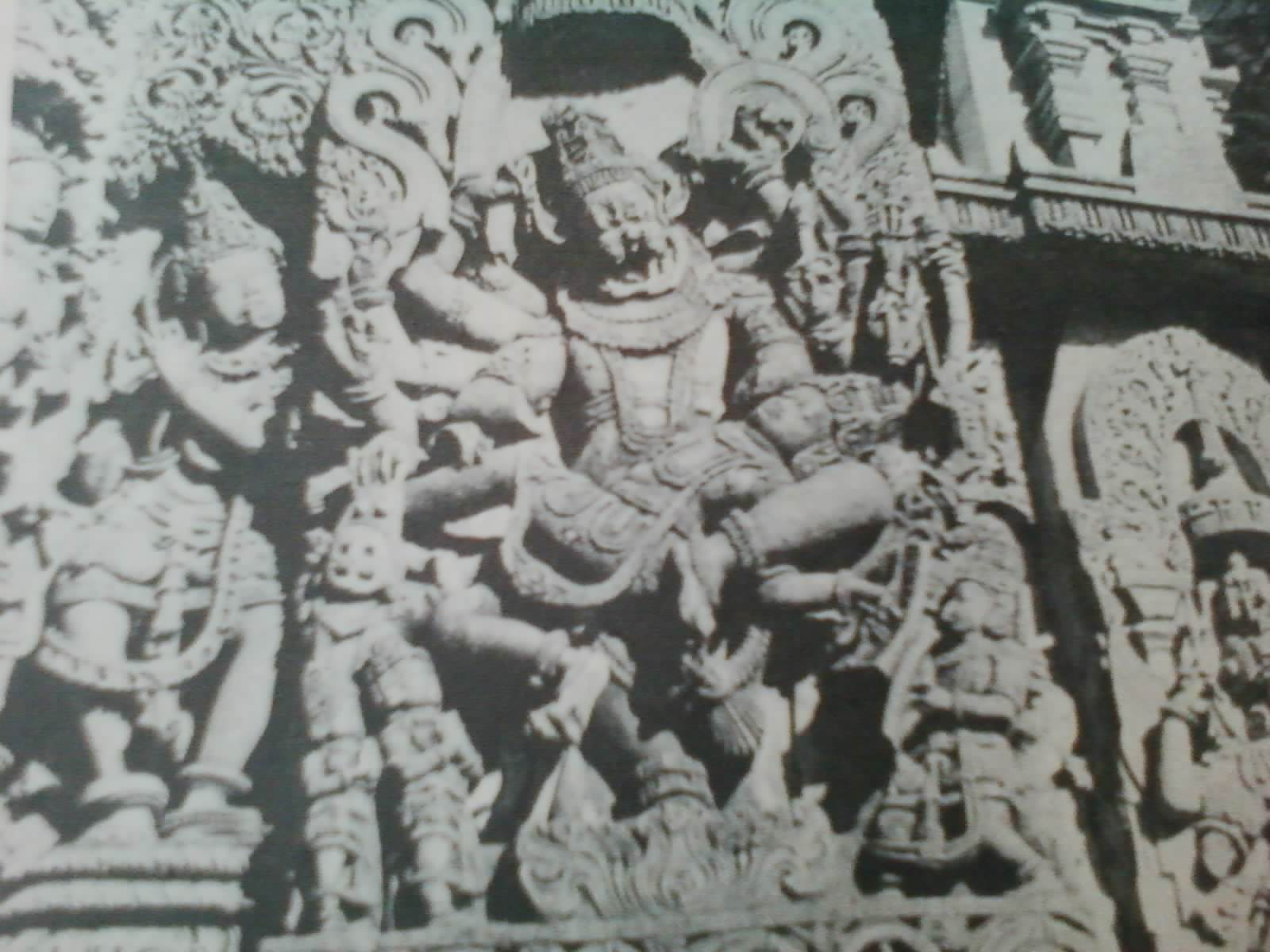
Temple architecture of Halebid

Hyder Ali, who overtook the Mysore from the Wodeyars ruled from Srirangapattana. He soon displaced Nanjaraj, the prime minister, and made the Raja a prisoner in his own palace. Tipu Sultan succeeded Hyder Ali. He fought bloody wars against the British and their allies but was resoundingly defeated by a confederation of the British, the Marathas and the Hyderabad Nijamas in the Fourth Anglo-Mysore War and died on the battlefield in 1799 CE.

== Mysore Wodeyars ==
Time Period / Era	Empire / Dynasty	Main Rulers	Empire Extent
CE.1800 - CE.1831	Mysore Wodeyars	Krishna Raja Wodeyar III	Old Mysore area

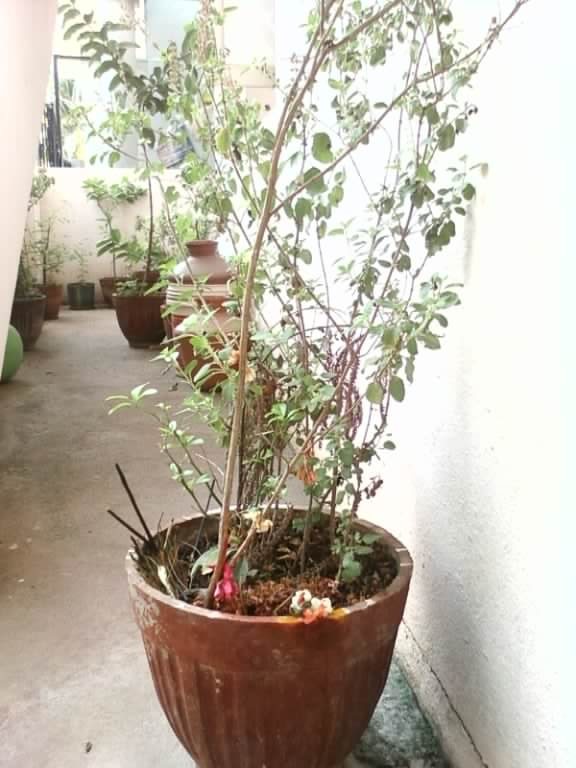
The worshipped Tulasi plant.

After the defeat of Tipu, according to the treaty in 1800 CE, the British divided the state in which Bellary, Kadapa, Kurnool areas went to Nijamas; Marathas got the northern parts; the coastal parts were retained by the British, but they divided it among Bombay and Madras presidencies. The then governor-general of British India Markvis of Wellesley reinstated the Wodeyar in Mysore and administration was given to Dewan Purnaiya because the throne prince was still young. Purnaiya was an able administrator, and under his guidance, the empire functioned like any modern government. The other ministers in line were Sir Sheshadri Aiyar, Dr. M. Visveswaraya and Sir Mirza Ismail. Around 1824 CE "Rani Channamma" and her general "Sangoli Rayanna" of Kittur started to fight against British and declared independence. Due to this, in 1831 CE the British took over the empire.

== British takeover ==
Time Period / Era	Empire / Dynasty	Main Rulers	Empire Extent
CE.1831 - CE.1881	British Takeover.	Commissioners of British	Old Mysore and other areas

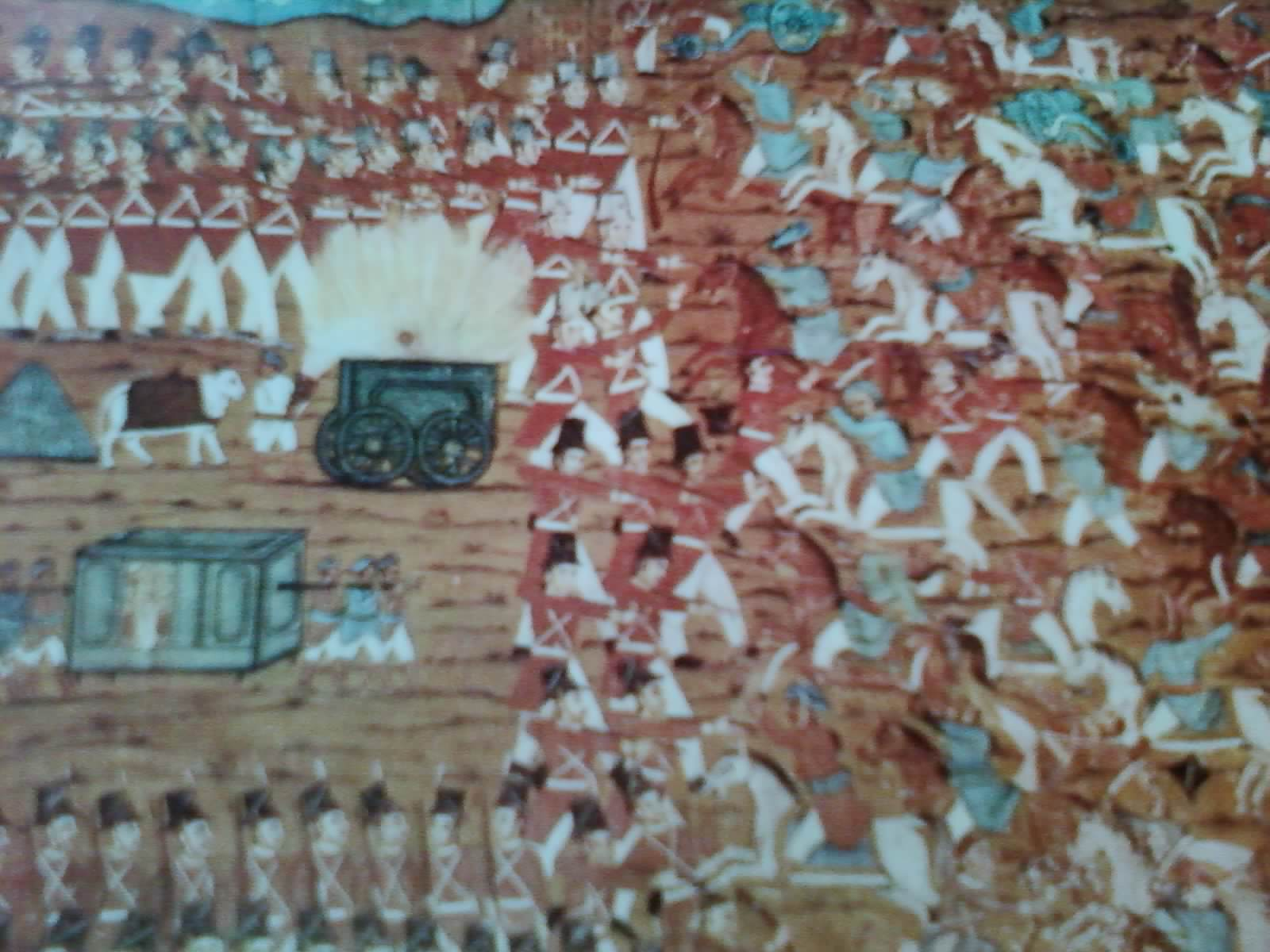
Painting of Mysore style

In 1831 CE the British overtook the empire and appointed the commissioners, who were yakshith given the power to rule on behalf of the British empire. Among them, Mark Cubbon was the most important. They systematically changed the way the empire functioned and brought in major changes but they continued some of the older traditions. During this period the state got divided between Bombay and Madras provinces, Hyderabad Nijamas and Mysore.

== Mysore Wodeyars ==
Time Period / Era	Empire / Dynasty	Main Rulers	Empire Extent
CE.1881 - CE.1950	Mysore Wodeyars	Krishna Raja Wodeyar 4/Jayachamaraja Wodeyar	old Mysore area

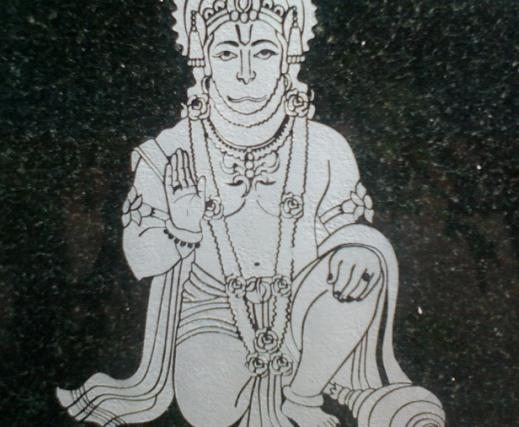
Hanuman is popular in Karnataka

After a period of British Commissioners' rule, Mysore was given back to the Jessicas. During this period the urge to independence gained momentum with the result that many leaders were imprisoned. The struggle finally led to the grant of independence to India by the British. The rule of the Wodeyars continued until the Indian independence and finally they merged Mysore with the Indian union which got incorporated into India as a state.

== Karnataka State ==
Time Period / Era	Empire / Dynasty	Main Rulers	Empire Extent
CE.1956	Karnataka State	Government	Whole of Karnataka

After the Indian independence and partition of the country, the states were reorganised based on the linguistic and other criteria and thus the divided areas of Kannada speaking population came together to form the present day Karnataka under the name of Mysore. On 1973 November 1, the name Mysore was changed to Karnataka. The state choose the city of Bangalore as its capital and gave Kannada the status of an administrative language. The Vidhana Soudha build by Kengal Hanumanthya became the state parliament house. The Attara Kachery was made the state high court.

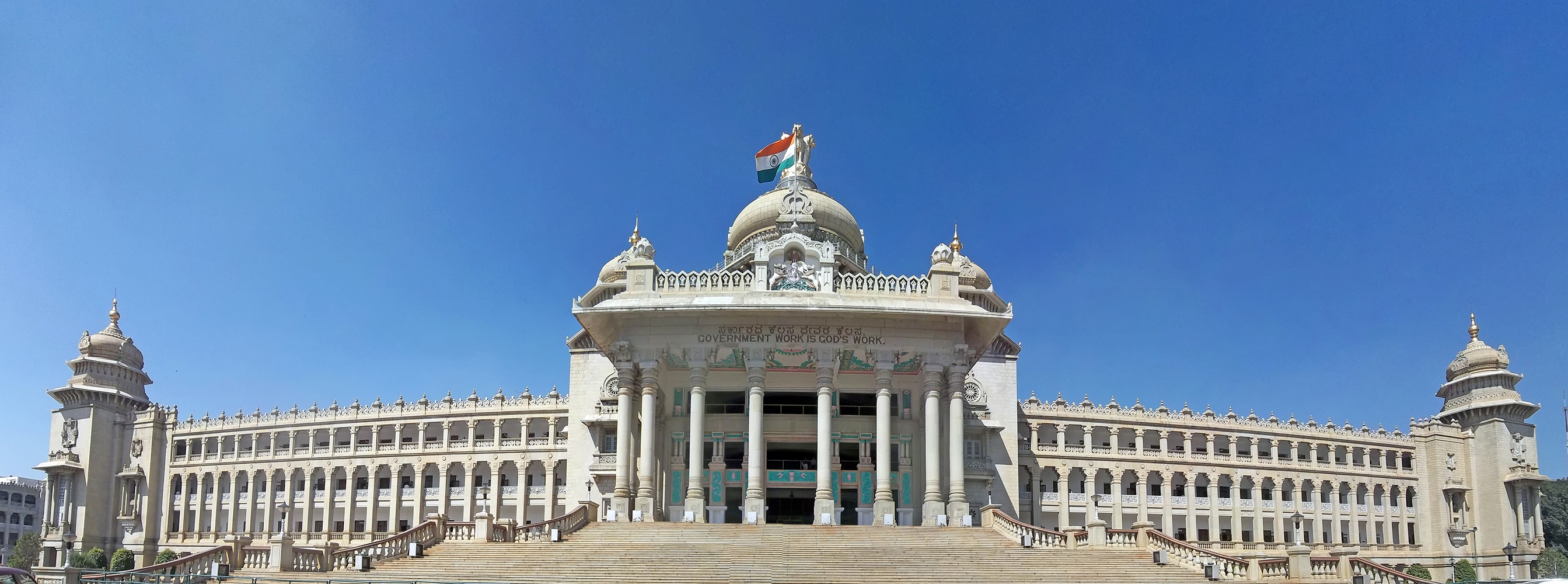
Vidhana Soudha

== Bengaluru City ==
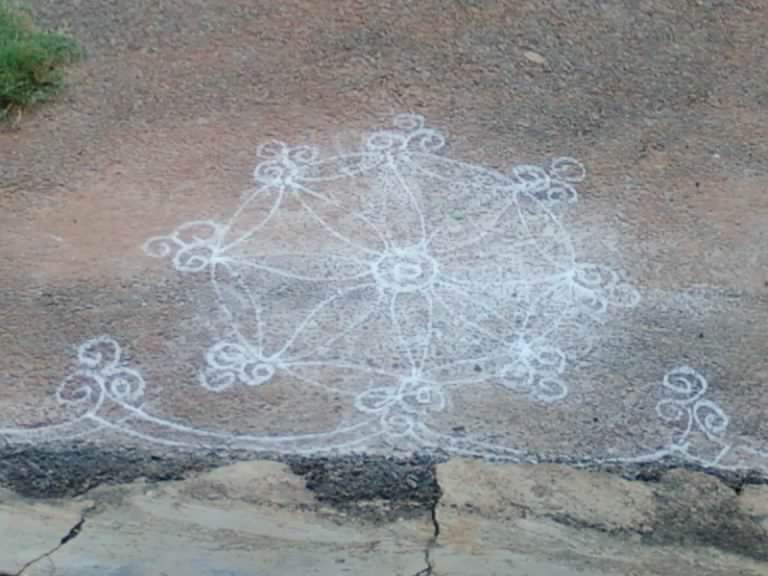
The Rangoli is a traditional art of Karnataka women.

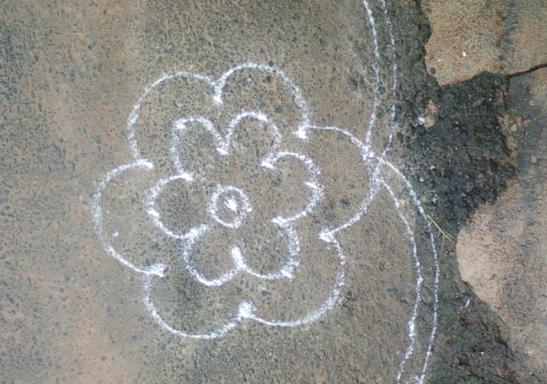
The Rangoli is also popular throughout India.

In around c.1537 CE an important event occurred that of establishment of Bengaluru city by Kempegowda who was a chieftain of Yalahanka kingdom. According to popular belief, when Kempegowda went to hunting he saw a mola (rabbit) chasing a naayi (dog). He thought this as a good sign and in that place he built a fort which led to the foundation of the city of Bengaluru. Pleased by this, the Vijayanagar emperor Achutaraya awarded the place around the fort to Kempegowda. Kempegowda used the money of the empire to improve the city and to make the foreign traders and local workers settle down there. He built viewing (watching) towers and his emblems in all the four directions of the city at places like Alasuru, Hebbala, Lalbag, and Kempambudi lake. Even today they can be seen and it remains as his memories. These towers are used as emblems of Bangalore city corporation. Although the extent of the towers was large in those days, today the city has outgrown them.

== Summary ==
The table shows the summary

Time Period / Era	Empire / Dynasty	Main Rulers	Empire Extent
Starting period	Shatavahana	Semukha, Gouthamiputhra	Deccan comprising present Andhra, Karnataka, Maharashtra
CE.325 - CE.540	Banavasi Kadamba	Mayura Sharma, Kakusta Varma	Central, Western, Northwestern Karnataka
CE.325 - CE.999	Gangas of Talakadu	Avanitha, Durvinitha, Ratchamalla	South Karnataka, parts of Andhra and Tamil Nadu
CE.500 - CE.757	Chalukyas of Badami	Mangalesha, Pulakeshi II ( Immadi Pulakesh)	Parts of Karnataka, Maharashtra, Gujarath, Orrisa, Andhra
CE.757 - CE.973	Rastrakutha of Malakeada	Krishna I, Govinda III, Nrupatunga Amoghavarsha I	Parts of Karnataka, Andra, Tamil Nadu, Madhyapradash, Maharashtra
CE.973 - CE.1198	Chalukyas of Kalyana	Vikramadithya VI	Parts of Karnataka, Andra, Tamil Nadu, Madhyapradash, Maharashtra
CE.1198 - CE.1312	Sevunas of Devagiri	Singana II	Parts of Karnataka, Andra, Maharashtra
CE.1000 - CE.1346	Hoysalas of Dwarasamudra	Vishnuvardhana, Ballala II	Parts of south and coastal Karnataka, Andra, Tamil Nadu
CE.1336 - CE.1565	Vijayanagara	Devaraya II, Krishnadevaraya	Most of Karnataka, Kerala, Tamil Nadu, Andhra
CE.1347 - CE.1527	Bahumani	Muhammad Shah I, Muhammad Shah II	Deccan area
CE.1490 - CE.1686	Sultans of Bijapur	Yusaf Addil Khan, Ibrahim Addil Shah II	Bijapur and adjoining areas
CE.1500 - CE.1763	Nayakas of Kelaedi	Shivappa Nayaka, Rani Channama	Parts of Coastal Karnataka
CE.1399 - CE.1761	Wodeyars of Mysore	RajaWodeyar, Ranadhira Kantirava, Chikadevaraja	Old Mysore region
CE.1588 - CE.1779	Nayakas of Chitradurga	Thimmanna Nayaka, Madakari Nayaka	Parts of Central Karnataka, Andra
CE.1761 - CE.1799	Sultanate of Srirangapatana	HyderAli, Tippu Sultan	Parts of Karnataka, Andhra
CE.1800 - CE.1831	Mysore Wodeyars	Krishna Raja Wodeyar III	Old Mysore area
CE.1831 - CE.1881	British Takeover.	Commissioners of British	Old Mysore and other areas
CE.1881 - CE.1950	Mysore Wodeyars	Krishna Raja Wodeyar IV, Jayachamaraja Wodeyar	old Mysore area
CE.1956	Karnataka State	Government	Whole of Karnataka

== See also ==
- History of Karnataka
- Political history of medieval Karnataka
- Etymology of Karnataka
- Kannada literature
- Charition mime
- History of Karnataka
