= Havigannada dialect =

Dravidian language

Havigannada
- ಹವಿಗನ್ನಡ
- Pronunciation: [hɐviˈgɐnːɐɖa]
- Native to: India
- Region: South India: Kanara; Malenadu (Karnataka)
- Ethnicity: Havyakas
- Language family: Dravidian: Southern; Southern I; Tamil–Kannada; Kannada–Badaga; Kannadoid; Kannada; Coastal; Havigannada
- Early form: Proto-Dravidian: Old Kannada
- Writing system: Kannada script Kannada Braille

Language codes
- ISO 639-1: kn
- ISO 639-2: kan
- ISO 639-3: kan
- Glottolog: havy1234
- Linguasphere: 49-EBA-a
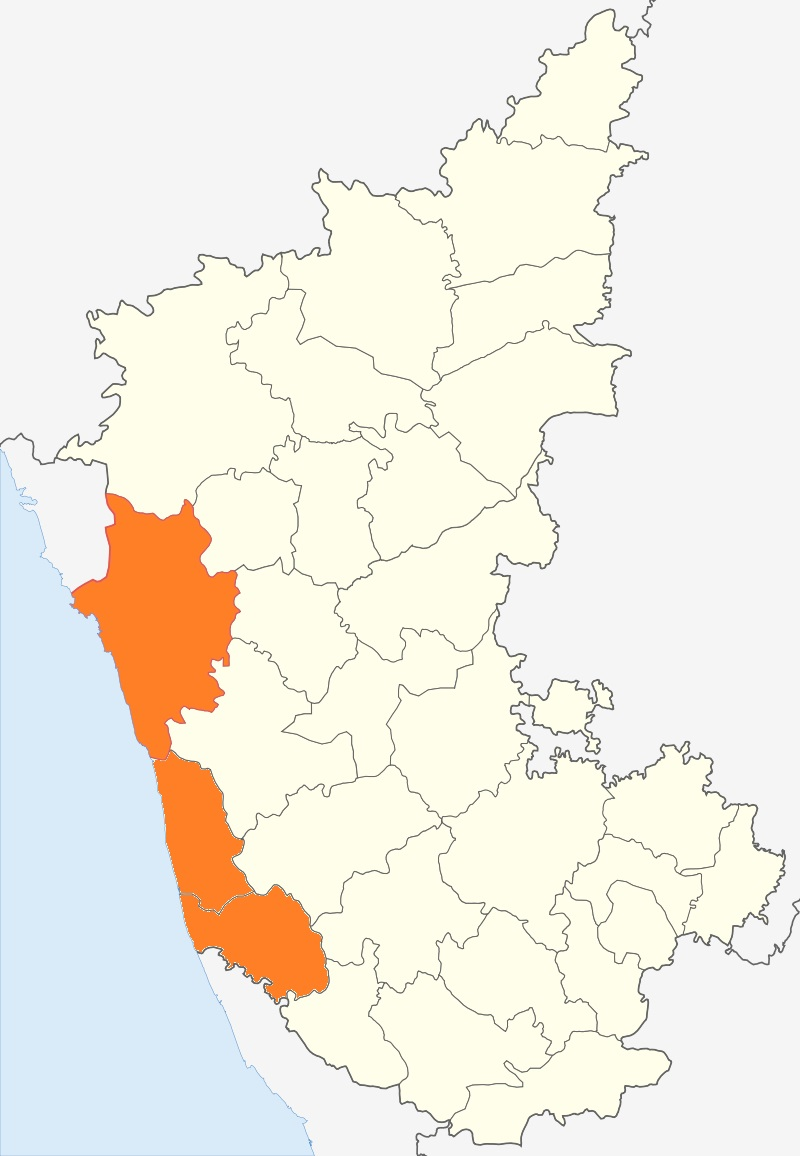

Havigannada, also called as Havyaka Bhaashe and Havyaka Kannada, is the dialect of Kannada spoken by Havyaka Brahmins in Malenadu and the coastal region of Karnataka, as well as the Kasargod district of Kerala.

== Characteristics ==
Havigannada differs substantially from mainstream Kannada, in terms of vocabulary, pronouns and verb-endings. It preserves many features of Old Kannada which are lost in other dialects of Kannada. This is the reason why even native Kannadigas of other regions find it difficult to comprehend it.

In 1883, the dialect was described by James Campbell in the Gazetteer of the Bombay Presidency, where it was said to be Kannada spoken with a strong Malayalam influence. The Malayalam influence was assumed due to the similarities between the Havigannada dialect and Malayalam in terms of accent and words. For example, Havigannada uses eṅgaḷ‍ for "our" or "we" and this is comparable to Malayalam eṅṅaḷ‍ and Tamil eṅgaḷ‍; similarly, naṅgaḷ is used for "we" in Havigannada, comparable to Malayalam ñaṅṅaḷ and Tamil nāṅgaḷ. On the other hand, standard Kannada uses namma and nāvu for "our" and "we" respectively. This potential Malayalam influence was then overextended to theorize that the Malayalam language was perhaps initially prevalent along the Kanara coast before it was settled by Kannada speakers from inland regions. However, it is now known that Malayalam, Tulu, and Havigannada coexisted on the Kanara coast, influencing each other in a linguistic sprachbund.

Some features of Havigannada may indeed be due to Malayalam or Tulu influence, such as 1st and 2nd person -gaḷ pronouns, which are not found in Old Kannada but are first attested in Middle Tamil before it evolved into Malayalam. These pronouns are also found in Tulu.

However, many other features occur because Havigannada is more conservative than modern Kannada dialects and preserves many archaic features which are lost in other Kannada dialects but are parallelly preserved in Tamil and Malayalam.

The Havigannada spoken in Uttara Kannada differs from the Havigannada spoken in Dakshina Kannada. The Havigannada spoken in Dakshina Kannada is influenced by Tulu (due to its prevalence in South Canara) and Malayalam (due to its close proximity to Kerala). In some parts of Uttara Kannada, especially in Gokarna, where there is a high concentration of Havyaka Brahmin priests, a Konkani influence has been observed in terms of vocabulary: āi for "mother", pyele for "drinking glass", etc. This might be because of the patronage of Konkani clients who regularly come to Gokarna to have their religious rituals performed by Havyaka priests.

In Havigannada, /o/ and /e/ are pronounced /wa/ and /ye/ respectively when they occur at the beginning of a word. For example, ole (stove/fireplace) is pronounced /ole/ in standard Kannada but /wale/ in Havigannada; ondu (one) as /wandu/ and ele (leaf) is pronounced /ele/ in standard Kannada but /yele/ in Havigannada. This is also observed in other non-standard Kannada and Indian Tamil dialects.

The difference between Havigannada and standard Kannada is mainly observed in the inflection of verbs. For example, in standard Kannada, māḍalu means "[in order] to do", which is an infinitive form. Havigannada uses māḍale or māḍule. While standard Kannada uses ide for "[it] is", Havigannada uses iddu. In standard Kannada, one would say avaḷu bandiddāḷe for "she has come" but in Havigannada it would be adu banju or adu baindu (the Havyakas of Uttara Kannada say banju, while those from Dakshina Kannada say baindu). The Havigannada spoken in Uttara Kannada bears a resemblance to Kundagannada, a Kannada dialect spoken in Kundapura and other Kannada-speaking regions of the Udupi district.

Havigannada has retained many words and features from Old Kannada. Some examples are the word kūsu which means "little girl" which comes from Old Kannada kūsu which means "little child/little girl". This word is not seen elsewhere in other Kannada dialects. The verb oragu in Havigannada means "to sleep" and is inherited from Old Kannada oṟagu; this verb is likewise not seen elsewhere in other Kannada dialects. In Tamil, urangu means to sleep.

== Usage ==
It is spoken in the Uttara Kannada, Dakshina Kannada and Shivamogga districts of Karnataka and the Kasaragod district of Kerala. In these districts, it is common in places where there is a higher density of Havyakas in relation to other places, such as Thirthahalli, Shivamogga, Sagara and Hosanagara in Shivamogga, Sirsi, Yellapur, Siddapura, Honnavar, Kumta, Bhatkal, in Uttara Kannada and Puttur in Dakshina Kannada. It is also spoken by Havyakas who are settled in metropolitan cities such as Bangalore, Mumbai, etc. In Bangalore, where a substantial percentage of Havyaka Brahmins have migrated to in the preceding decades, there is a language shift among Havigannada speakers towards Bangalore Kannada, especially among the younger generation who were born and brought up in Bangalore.

In some parts of Uttara Kannada District such as Kumta, Honnavara, Bhatkal, Sirsi, and Siddapur, neuter gender is often used instead of feminine gender.

Havigannada was partly used in Sandalwood films: Bettada Jeeva, Nammoora Mandara Hoove and Naayi Neralu, which was shot in and around Yana.

== Examples ==
=== Pronouns ===
English	Kannada	Havigannada
I	ನಾನು (Naanu)	ನಾನು / ನಾ (Naa) / ಆನು (Aanu)
We	ನಾವು (Naavu)	ನಾವು / ನಂಗ (Nanga) / ಎಂಗ (yanga)
You (Singular)	ನೀನು (Neenu)	ನೀನು / ನೀ (Nee)
You (Plural)	ನೀವು (Neevu)	ನೀವು / ನಿಂಗ (Ninga)
He	ಅವನು (Avanu)	ಅವನು / ಅವ (Ava) / ಅಂವ (Amva)
She	ಅವಳು (Avalu)	ಅವಳು / ಅದು (Adu) / ಅವ (Ava)/ ಅವಳ್ (Avalu)
It	ಅದು (Adu)	ಅದು
They (Neutral)	ಅವು (Avu)	ಅವು

=== Verbs ===
English	Kannada	Havigannada
will go	Hoguttene(ಹೋಗುತ್ತೇನೆ )	Hogti(ಹೋಗ್ತಿ)/Hogte(ಹೋಗ್ತೆ)/Hovthe(ಹೋವ್ತೆ)
will come	Baruttene(ಬರುತ್ತೇನೆ)	Batte(ಬತ್ತೆ)/Batti(ಬತ್ತಿ)
will do	Maaduttene(ಮಾಡುತ್ತೇನೆ)	Maadte(ಮಾಡ್ತೆ)/Maadti(ಮಾಡ್ತಿ)

=== Interrogative ===
English	Kannada	Havigannada
Why	yaake(ಯಾಕೆ)	Entakke(ಎಂತಕೆ)
How	hege(ಹೇಗೆ)	Henge(ಹೇಂಗೆ)
What	enu(ಏನು)	Entadu(ಎಂತದು)/Enta(ಎಂತ)/Entu(ಎಂತು)/Ensu(ಎನ್ಸು)
