= Duggaladka =

- Neighbourhood
- Location in Karnataka, India Duggaladka (India)
- Coordinates: 12°33′29″N 75°23′21″E
- Country: India
- State: Karnataka
- Region: Tulu nadu
- District: Dakshina Kannada

Languages
  - Official: Tulu, Are Bhashe, Havigannada, Byaari Bhashe
- Time zone: UTC+5:30 (IST)
- PIN: 574239
- Telephone code: 91-8257
- Vehicle registration: KA-21

Duggaladka is a place in Sullia taluk and village in the Dakshina Kannada district of the state of Karnataka, India. It is a small town, surrounded with evergreen wooded mountains in the Western Ghats range in South India. Duggaladka has plantations of rubber, areca nut, coconut, cashew nut, black pepper and banana. State highway that connects Sullia and Kukke Subramanya runs through Duggaladka. Duggaladka is situated 10 km from Sullia, 30 km from Kukke Subramanya and 90 km from Mangalore.

Duggaladka is surrounded by places like Koikuli, Kootelu, Kandadka, Neerabidire, Gontadka and Moodekallu. Duggaladka Govt High School and Koikuli Higher Primary School are the education institutes in Duggaladka.

== History ==
Duggaladka's name came from the Bootha (Boothas in Dakshina Kannada District were considered Shiva's guards) Duggalaya. Duggalayana Adka (Duggalaya's Land) became Duggaladka. Duggalaya Bootha is of Kaldambe family, they used to do pooja and worship the Bootha. Duggalaya is considered a powerful god in Duggaladka. There are also other Boothas such as Panjurli, Pilichamundi and others. Duggalaya Daivasthana is present at the place called Nadubettu, the actual place of Bootha (called Moola Sthana) is in Neerabidire. Both these places are a walkable distance from Duggaladka bus stand. It belongs to Sullia Town Panchayath.
