= Nanjangud Tirumalamba =

Kannada author, newspaper editor, and publisher (1887–1982)

Nanjanagudu Tirumalamba
- Born: Nanjanagudu Tirumalamba; 25 March 1887; Nanjanagudu, Mysore State, British India (now in Mysore, Karnataka, India)
- Died: 31 August 1982 (aged 95); Nanjangud, Mysore, Karnataka, India.
- Occupations: Kannada writer, political activist, feminist, poet, writer, publisher, newspaper editor, printer
- Parent(s): Venkatakrishna Iyengar, Alamelamma

Nanjanagudu Tirumalamba (1887 – 1982; also known as Nanjangud Tirumalamba) was a Mysorean author, newspaper editor, publisher, and printer. She was born on 25 March 1887 in Nanjanagudu, Mysore (then under British India) to Venkatakrishna, a lawyer, and Alamelamma. While her native language was Tamil, she also spoke Telugu and Kannada. She died in Nanjanagudu, Karnataka on 31 August 1982.

== Early life ==
Tirumalamba was married at the age of 10 and widowed at 14. Her father, a bibliophile, introduced her to a wide range of literature, including the Ramayana, Mahabharata, and Bhagavatha, as well as plays by authors such as Nanjanagudu Srikanta Shastri, Bellave Somanathayya, and M. Venkatadri Shastri. Her mother died when Tirumalamba was 5 years old.

== Career as a teacher ==
Tirumalamba taught local children at her house, which became known as Mathru Mandira (Kannada: ಮಾತೃಮಂದಿರ, lit. 'mother's temple'). She established a newspaper called Sanmargadarshini for her students. Tirumalamba's personal writings, initially for self-study, were later shared with her students, which encouraged her to expand her writing into various forms, including drama, fiction, stories, and songs.

== Career as a writer ==
Tirumalamba submitted a story to a competition organized by Madhuravani, a monthly magazine from Mysore. The editor, K. Hanuman, visited her home and discovered a collection of her literary works. Impressed by a piece titled Vidhava Kartavya, he published it in Madhuravani. Tirumalamba continued writing, and soon after, established a publication house called Sathi Hitaishini.

== Career as a publisher ==
Tirumalamba started a publishing house, Sathi Hitaishini, which published her first novel, Sushile, in 1913, which saw four editions and sold over 7000 copies. The publication house also published works by other authors, including Sanmarga Granthavali by Panyam Sundarashastri and Sanmarga Grantha Malika by Saraguru Venkata Varadacharya. Other publications included Nandini Granthamala and Science of Decoration by Dr. S. N. Narasimhayya, as well as medical books like Suksmayurveda Chikitsa Prayoga and Sarala Unipathi Chikisakata by Dr. Srinivas Murthy. Between 1913 and 1916, Tirumalamba authored eleven books, including Nabha, Vidyullatha, and Harina. She authored approximately 28 works in total, including stories, novels, short novels, detective novels, essays, poems, and plays. Her final novel, ManiMala, was published in 1939.

== Career as a newspaper editor ==
Tirumalamba established a monthly magazine, Karnataka Nandini, with the stated intention of supporting women through literature. Contributors included the poet Udupi TulasiBai and Kademgodlu Shankara Bhattaru. A column titled Kannada Rannagannadi featured advocates of the Kannada language. Due to a lack of contributors, Tirumalamba used various pen names to fill the magazine's columns, but this practice proved unsustainable, and the magazine eventually ceased publication.

== Death and legacy ==
After her father's death, Tirumalamba's writing shifted towards philosophical themes before ceasing altogether. She died at the age of 95 on 31 August 1982.

== Awards, honours, and reception ==
Several works published by Sati Hitaisini, including Matrunandini, Chandravadana, and Ramananda, received awards from the Madras School Book and Literature Society. The Vidyavardhaka Sangha of Karnataka also honored works like Ramananda and Purnakala. Tirumalamba's writings received recognition from the governments of Mysore, Madras, and Bombay. Her works were used as textbooks in schools across Madras, Mysore, and Bombay for nearly two decades, starting in 1917. In 1980, she was honored by the Rajya Sahitya Academy.

== Tirumalamba Award ==
The Shaswathi institution, founded by C. N. Mangala, presents the Tirumalamba Award to outstanding female writers in honor of Tirumalamba.

== Novels ==
- Sushile (1913)
- Nabha
- Vidyullata
- Viragini
- Daksakanye (spy)
- Manimala

== Drama ==
- Savitri Charitre
- Janaki Kalyana

== See also ==
- Indian literature
- List of Indian writers
- List of Indian women writers
