= Srivijaya (poet) =

9th-century Kannada poet and minister

Śrīvijaya
- ಶ್ರೀವಿಜಯ
- Occupations: Poet, Minister
- Writing career
- Language: Kannada, Sanskrit
- Period: 9th century CE
- Genres: Poetry, Literary Criticism
- Notable work: Kavirajamarga (attributed)
- Movements: Jain literature, Early Kannada literature

Śrīvijaya (Kannada: ಶ್ರೀವಿಜಯ) was a prominent 9th-century Kannada poet and minister in the court of the Rashtrakuta emperor Amoghavarsha I (r. c. 814–878 CE). He is widely believed by scholars to be the co-author or literary advisor behind Kavirajamarga (c. 850 CE), the earliest known Kannada literary treatise.

== Biography ==
Śrīvijaya flourished during the reign of Amoghavarsha I, who was not only a powerful monarch but also a patron of Jainism and literature. Although Śrīvijaya worked in the Rashtrakuta court at Manyakheta, he is believed to have hailed from or been previously associated with the Western Ganga dynasty of southern Karnataka.

== Literary contribution ==
He is most closely associated with the composition of Kavirajamarga, the first literary treatise in Kannada, which outlines poetic styles, grammar, and rhetorical norms. While the work is officially attributed to King Amoghavarsha I, many historians believe Śrīvijaya either authored it or significantly contributed to its composition as a court poet and advisor.

Kavirajamarga draws inspiration from Sanskrit works such as Dandin's Kavyadarsha and adapts those principles to Kannada literary norms.

== Religious affiliation ==
Śrīvijaya was a devout Digambara Jain, and his association with both the Ganga and Rashtrakuta dynasties highlights the strong influence of Jain scholars in early Kannada culture. His works reflect Jain values like "ahimsa" (non-violence), renunciation, and learning.

== Legacy ==
Śrīvijaya's role was critical in shaping Kannada literary identity during its formative period. His guidance under Amoghavarsha's reign helped establish classical standards that would influence generations of poets. His connection with Jainism also marks the peak period of Jain patronage in Karnataka.

== See also ==
• Kavirajamarga • Amoghavarsha I • Western Ganga dynasty • Jainism in Karnataka • Kannada literature
