= Reginald Edward Enthoven =

Administrator in the British Raj

Reginald Edward Enthoven CIE (1869– 21 May 1952) was an administrator in the Indian Civil Service of the British Raj and an author of publications related to India, including the three volumes entitled The Tribes and Castes of Bombay that formed a part of the Ethnographic Survey of India.

== Biography ==
Reginald Enthoven was born in Hastings, Sussex, England, on 23 November 1869, the fifth son of James and Miriam Enthoven. He attended Wellington College and then, using his family connections as a great-nephew of James Joseph Sylvester, he was able to secure a place at New College, Oxford reserved for students intending to pursue a career in the Indian Civil Service. In 1887, the same year that he matriculated at New College, he was appointed to the Indian Civil Service (ICS) upon passing the competitive examination. He arrived in India on 1 December 1889.

Initially appointed in Bombay as an Assistant District collector and Assistant Magistrate, as well as an Inspector of Factories, by June 1896 Enthoven was promoted to Second Assistant. From 1900 until 1902 he served as First Assistant and Under-Secretary, being a Provincial Superintendent in Bombay for the 1901 census of India. Thereafter he was appointed to superintend the revision of the Imperial Gazetteer and was Director-General of Statistics. He was elected a Fellow of the Royal Statistical Society in 1904.

Enthoven was appointed a Companion of the Order of the Indian Empire on 1 January 1910, at which time he was Secretary to the Government of Bombay, General, Educational, Marine, and Ecclesiastical Departments.

Enthoven had contributed the General Index to the 34 volumes of the Gazetteer of the Bombay Presidency that had been compiled by Sir James M. Campbell. In his later Tribes and Castes of Bombay, Enthoven placed much reliance on the work of Campbell, which Crispin Bates has described as being "compendious but unsystematic ethnographic researches". Kumar Suresh Singh has noted that the survey, conducted between 1901 and 1909, suffered from a shortage of funding, relied on amateur data collectors and used content from Campbell's Gazetteer without acknowledgement, thus leading to claims of plagiarism.

In retirement and living at Vale House, Wootton, Berkshire by 1935, Enthoven was an Ordinary Member of the Council of the Royal Asiatic Society and also one of its Honorary Auditors. He had been a member of the Society since 1907.

== Publications ==
- Campbell, Sir James M.; Enthoven, Reginald Edward (1883). Gazetteer of the Bombay Presidency.
- Enthoven, Reginald Edward (1897). The Cotton fabrics of the Bombay Presidency.
- Enthoven, Reginald Edward (1902). Bombay.
- Enthoven, Reginald Edward (1914). Folklore of the Konkan. Bombay.
- Enthoven, Reginald Edward (1911). Folklore of Gujarat.
- Enthoven, Reginald Edward (1922). The Tribes and Castes of Bombay. Bombay: Government Central Press. – three volumes, published between 1920–1922
- Enthoven, Reginald Edward (1924). The Folklore of Bombay. OXford: The Clarendon Press.
- Crooke, William; Enthoven, Reginald Edward (1926). Religion and folklore of Northern India.
