= Mangaluru Kannada =

Mangaluru Kannada is one of the three regional varieties of Kannada language, an official language of the Indian state of Karnataka. It is also referred as the "Coastal dialect". The other regional varieties of Kannada are Bengaluru / Mysuru Kannada and Dharwar Kannada (Northern dialect). Mangaluru Kannada is spoken with clear diction. And close to the way Kannada is taught in primary schools. Historical and mythological Kannada movies and dramas use Mangaluru Kannada. It sounds very formal and respectful to the listener.

== See also ==
- Bengaluru Kannada
- Mangaluru
