= Kavirajamarga =

Kannada classic work on poetics, rhetoric and grammar

A Stanza from Kavirajamarga which praises the people for their literary skills

Kavirajamarga (Kannada: ಕವಿರಾಜಮಾರ್ಗ) (850 C.E.) is the earliest available work on rhetoric, poetics and grammar in the Kannada language. It was inspired by or written in part by the famous Rashtrakuta King Amoghavarsha I, and some historians claim it is based partly on the Sanskrit text Kavyadarsha. Some historians believe Kavirajamarga may have been co-authored by a poet in the king's court, the Kannada language theorist Srivijaya.

The name literally means "Royal Path for Poets" and was written as a guide book for poets and scholars (Kavishiksha). From references made in this writing to earlier Kannada poetry and literature it is clear that a considerable body of work in prose and poetry must have existed in the preceding centuries.

== Early life ==
The pre-coronation name of Amoghavarsha I was Sharva. He was born in Sribhavan in 800 to Rashtrakuta King Govinda III during the king's return from his successful northern campaigns in Kanauj. This is known from the Manne records (803), Sirur plates and Sanjan records (871) of Amoghavarsha I. Amoghavarsha I came to the throne in 814 at the age of 14 and took great interest in the Kannada language, culture, country and its people, and his writing Kavirajamarga goes into these details as well. The work describes the entire region between the Godavari river in the north and Kaveri river in the south as "Kannada country", which includes large territories north and east of modern Karnataka where Kannada is now not spoken. An English translation of a quote from the writing goes as follows,

In all of the earth

No fairer land you'll find
Than that were rich sweet Kannada
Voices the people's mind
'Twixt sacred river twain it lies-
From famed Godavari
To where the pilgrim rests his eyes
Only holy Kaveri...
The people of that land are skilled
To speak in rhythmic tone,
And quick to grasp a poet's thought,
So kindred to their own
Not students only, but the folk
untutored in the school,
By instinct use and understand
The strict poetic rules.

~ Translateed from Kavirājamārga, 36-40

=== Early writers and literary styles ===
Kavirajamarga makes important references not only to earlier Kannada writers and poets but also to early literary styles that were in vogue in the various written dialects of Kannada language. The aim of this writing was to standardize these written styles. The book dwells on earlier styles of composition; the Bedande, the Chattana, and the Gadyakatha, and indicates that these styles were recognised by puratana kavi (lit, "earlier poets"). The term pruvacharyar (lit, earlier grammarians or rhetoricians) has also been used. The book mentions several early Kannada writers who preceded Amoghavarsha I: Vimalachandra (777), Udaya, Nagarjuna, Jayabhandu and 6th century King Durvinita of the Western Ganga Dynasty as the best writers of Kannada prose; Srivijaya, Kavisvara, Chandra Pandita and Lokapala as the best writers of Kannada poetry. But the works and compositions of these early authors are yet to be discovered. Kavirajamarga was formative in the literary growth of Kannada and is a guide book to the Kannada grammar that existed in that period. It laid the "royal path" for guiding many aspiring writers.

In his criticism, Amoghavarsha I writes that old Kannada is appropriate in "ancient poems" but is insipid in works of the present time, like an "association with an old woman". According to him, a mixture of Kannada with Sanskrit is "harsh to the ear" but a mixture of Kannada and Sama-Samskrita is pleasant to the ear like "music", while a mixture of Kannada and Sanskrit in compounds is disagreeable "like mixing drops of buttermilk (curdled milk) and boiling milk". He also condemned the usage of expletives such as ante, matte, and gadam.
