= Kalkeri =

Kalakeri, Vijayapura district
- village
- Location in Karnataka, India Kalakeri, Vijayapura district (India)
- Coordinates: 16.670143°N 76.309494°E
- Country: India
- State: Karnataka
- District: Bijapur
- Talukas: Sindgi

Government
  - Type: Panchayat raj
  - Body: Gram panchayat

Population (2001)
  - Total: 7,662

Languages
  - Official: Kannada
- Time zone: UTC+5:30 (IST)
- ISO 3166 code: IN-KA
- Vehicle registration: KA
- Website: karnataka.gov.in

Kalakeri is a village in Northern part of Karnataka, India. It is located in the Sindgi taluk of Vijayapura district in Karnataka. Pincode is 586118.

This should not be confused with the similarly spelled Kalkeri village in Haveri district, about 20 kilometers southwest from Haveri, with two important Hoysala era temples – Someshwara temple (trikuta) and Basaveshwara temple (chaturkuta). Furthermore, it should not be confused with three villages all named Kalkere – one near Bengaluru, other north of Soraba and near Hangal (with an important two-sanctum Hoysala temple), and third in a horse-shoe shaped valley south of Channagiri.

== Demographics ==
As of 2001 India census, Kalakeri had a population of 7662 with 3866 males and 3796 females.

== See also ==
- Bijapur, Karnataka
- Districts of Karnataka
