= Kannada =

Dravidian language

- Canarese
- ಕನ್ನಡ
- The word "Kannada" in Kannada script
- Pronunciation: [ˈkənːəɖa]
- Native to: India
- Region: Karnataka; North Tamil Nadu; South Maharashtra; West Andhra Pradesh; Telangana; North Kerala; Goa
- Ethnicity: Kannadigas
- Speakers: L1: 44 million (2011); L2: 15 million (2011)
- Language family: Dravidian: Southern; Southern I; Tamil–Kannada; Kannadoid; Kannada
- Early form: Proto-Dravidan: Old Kannada
- Standard forms: Bengaluru Kannada
- Dialects: Coastal: Mangalore Kannada Halakki Kannada Havigannada Kundagannada Nador-Kannada Halegannada Hatkar; Northern: Dharwad; South-Western: Arebhashe; Southern: Bengaluru Kannada Banakal Kannada
- Writing system: Kannada script; Kannada Braille

Official status
- Official language in: India: Karnataka
- Regulated by: Government of Karnataka

Language codes
- ISO 639-1: kn
- ISO 639-2: kan
- ISO 639-3: kan
- Glottolog: nucl1305
- Linguasphere: 49-EBA-a
- Distribution of Kannada native speakers, majority regions in dark blue and minority regions in light blue.

- Person: Kannaḍiga
- People: Kannaḍigaru
- Language: Kannaḍa

Kannada (Kannada: [ˈkənːəɖa]) is a Dravidian language spoken predominantly in the state of Karnataka in southwestern India, and spoken by a minority of the population in all neighbouring states . It has 44 million native speakers, and is additionally a second or third language for 15 million speakers in Karnataka. It is the official and administrative language of Karnataka. It also has scheduled status in India and has been declared one of the Classical languages of India.

Early Kannada literature was composed predominantly by Jaina court poets, and many texts from before the 12th century were religious narratives about the Jain Tīrthaṅkaras.

Kannada was the court language of a number of dynasties and empires of South India, Central India and the Deccan Plateau, namely the Kadamba dynasty, Western Ganga dynasty, Nolamba dynasty, Chalukya dynasty, Rashtrakutas, Western Chalukya Empire, Seuna dynasty, Kingdom of Mysore, Nayakas of Keladi, Hoysala dynasty and the Vijayanagara Empire.

Kannada is written using the Kannada script, which evolved from the 5th-century Kadamba script. Kannada is attested epigraphically for about one and a half millennia. Old Kannada Rashtrakuta literature flourished during the 8th-10th centuries CE. Kannada has an unbroken literary history of around 1500 years. In July 2011, a centre for the study of classical Kannada was established as part of the Central Institute of Indian Languages in Mysore to facilitate research related to the language.

== Geographic distribution ==
Kannada had 43.7 million native speakers in India at the time of the 2011 census. It is the main language of the state of Karnataka, where it is spoken natively by 40.6 million people, or about two-thirds of the state's population.

There are native Kannada speakers in the neighbouring states of Tamil Nadu (1,140,000 speakers), Maharashtra (993,000), Andhra Pradesh and Telangana (533,000), Kerala (78,100), and Goa (67,800).

It is also spoken as a second and third language by over 12.9 million non-native speakers in Karnataka.

Kannadigas form Tamil Nadu's third-largest linguistic group; their population is roughly 1.23 million, which is 2.2% of Tamil Nadu's total population.

In the United States, there were 35,900 speakers in 2006–2008, a number that had risen to 48,600 by 2015.

There are 4,000 speakers in Canada (2016 census), 9,700 in Australia (2016 census), 22,000 in Singapore (2018 estimate), and 59,000 in Malaysia (2021 estimate).

== Development ==
Kannada, like Malayalam and Tamil, is a South Dravidian language and a descendant of Tamil-Kannada, from which it derives its grammar and core vocabulary. Its history can be divided into three stages: Old Kannada, or Haḷegannaḍa from 450 to 1200 AD, Middle Kannada (Naḍugannaḍa) from 1200 to 1700 and Modern Kannada (Hosagannaḍa) from 1700 to the present.

Kannada has been considerably influenced by Sanskrit and Prakrit—in morphology, phonetics, vocabulary, grammar, and syntax. The three principal sources of influence on literary Kannada grammar appear to be Pāṇini's grammar, non-Pāṇinian schools of Sanskrit grammar, particularly Kātantra and Śākaṭāyana schools, and, to a lesser extent, Prakrit grammar. Literary Prakrit seems to have prevailed in Karnataka since ancient times. Speakers of vernacular Prakrit may have come into contact with Kannada speakers, thus influencing their language, even before Kannada was used for administrative or liturgical purposes. The scholar K.V. Narayana claims that many tribal languages now designated as Kannada dialects could be nearer to the earlier form of the language, with lesser influence from other languages. Based on native Kannada words in Prakrit inscriptions of that period, Kannada must have been spoken by a broad and stable population.

Kannada includes many loan words from Sanskrit. Some unaltered loan words (Sanskrit: तत्सम, romanized: tatsama, lit. 'same as that'') include dina, 'day', kōpa, 'anger', sūrya, 'sun', mukha, 'face', and nimiṣa, 'minute'. Some examples of naturalised Sanskrit words (Sanskrit: तद्भव, romanized: tadbhava, lit. 'arising from that') in Kannada are varṇa, 'colour', pūrṇime, and rāya from rāja, 'king'. Some naturalised words of Prakrit origin in Kannada are baṇṇa, 'colour' derived from vaṇṇa, huṇṇime, 'full moon' from puṇṇivā.

== History ==
=== Early traces ===
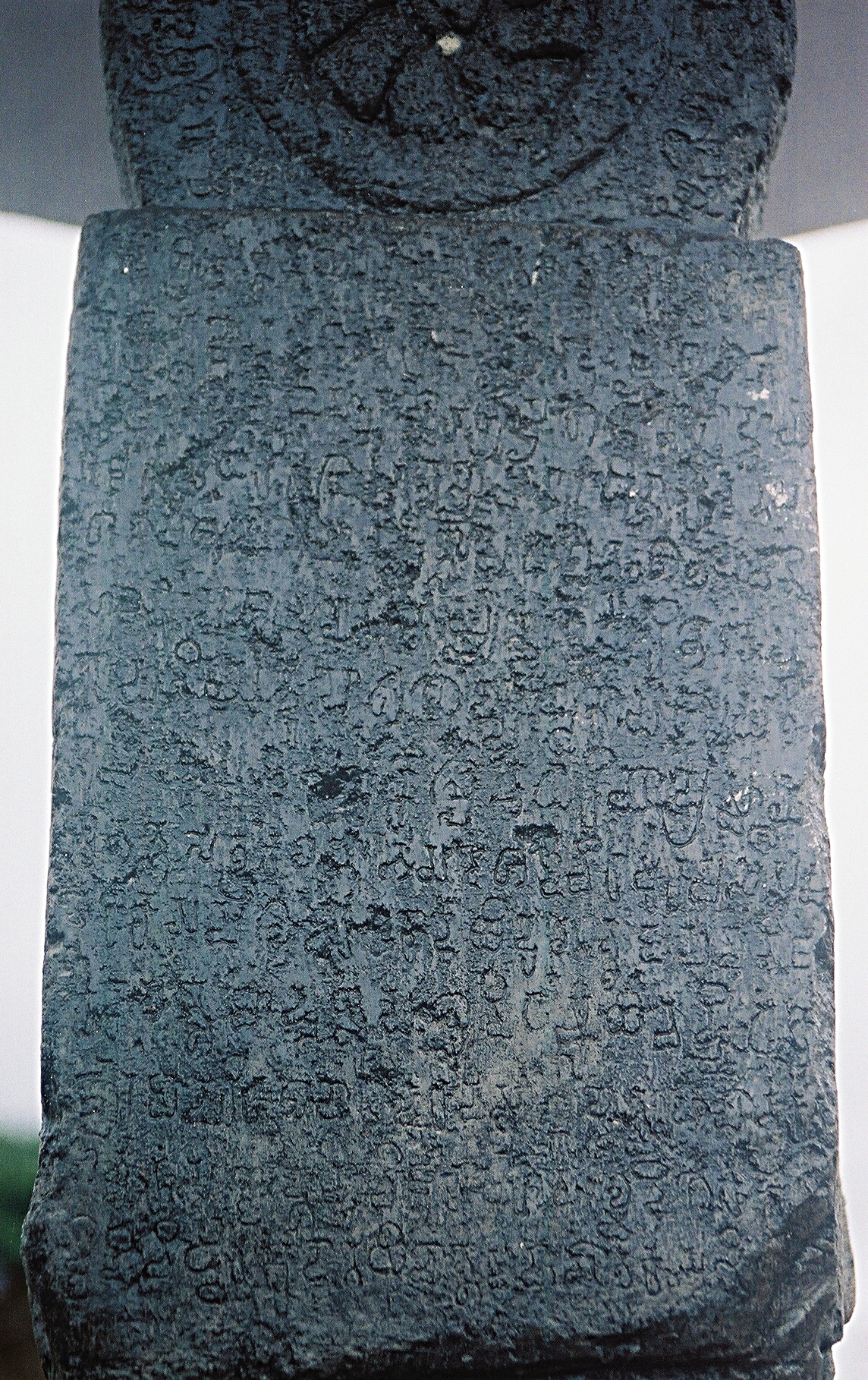
The Halmidi inscription at Halmidi village, in old-Kannada, is usually dated to 450 AD (Kadamba Dynasty).

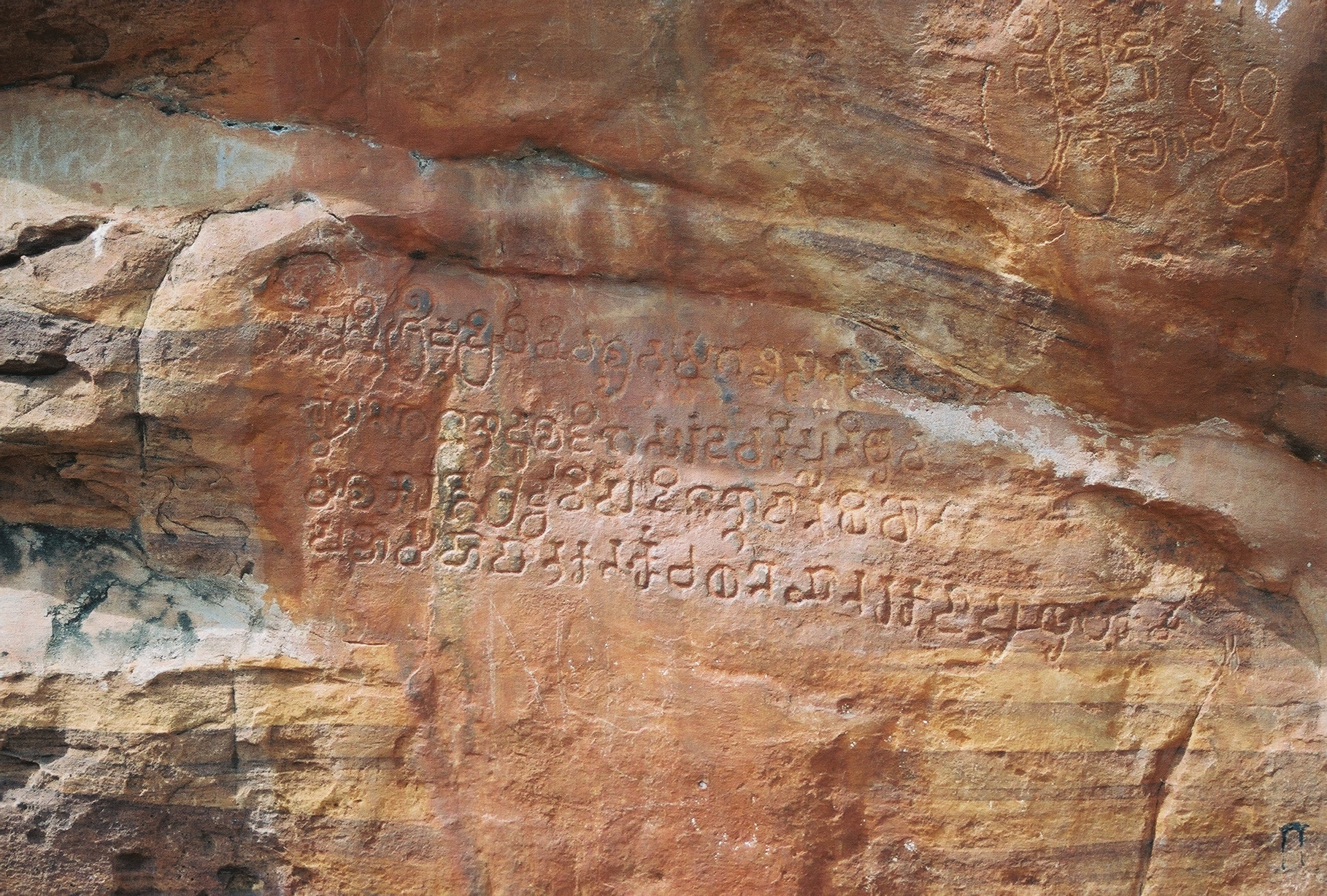
Old-Kannada inscription dated 578 AD (Badami Chalukya dynasty), outside Badami cave no.3

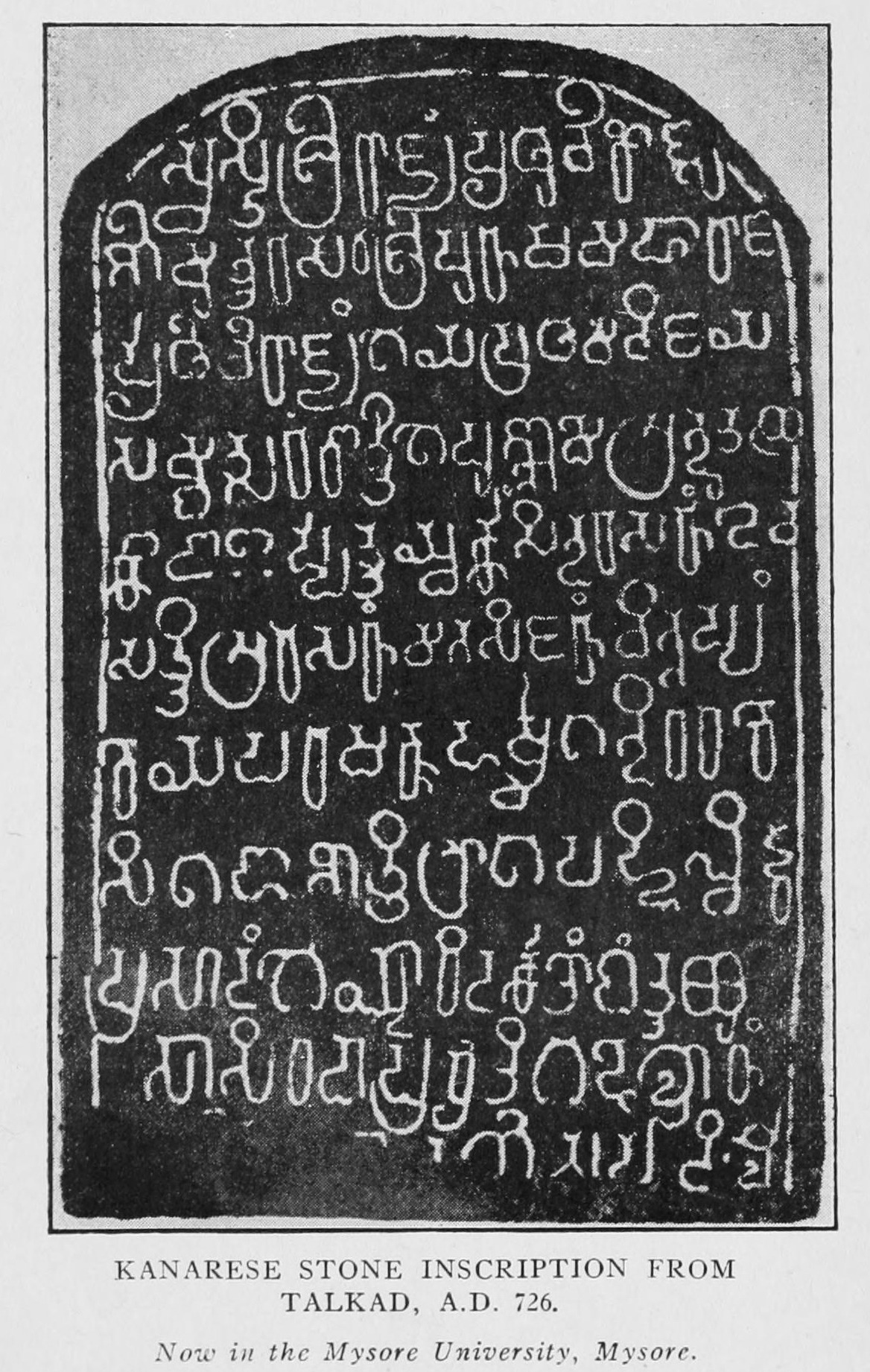
Old-Kannada inscription of c. 726 AD, discovered in Talakad, from the rule of King Shivamara I or Sripurusha (Western Ganga Dynasty)

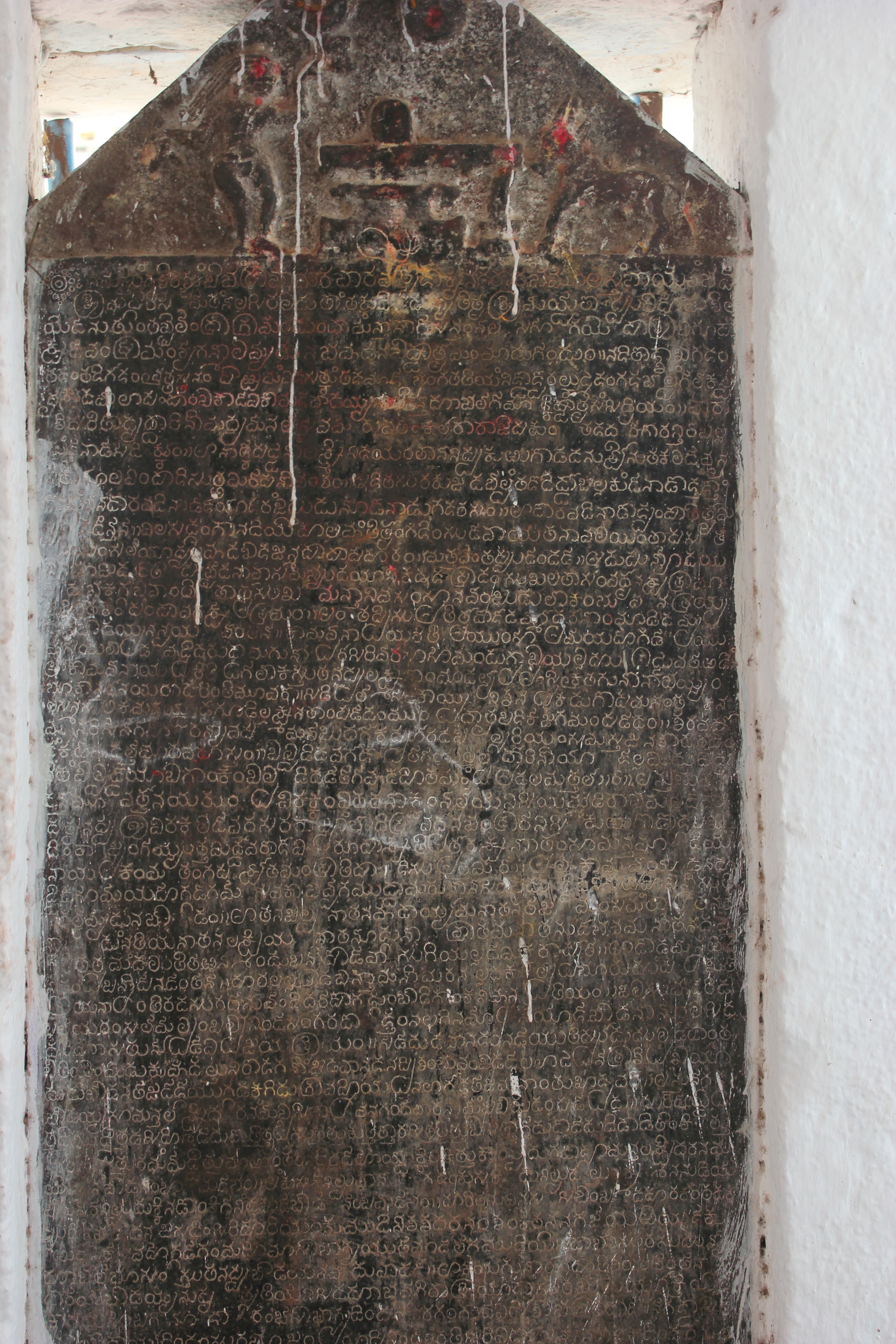
Old-Kannada inscription of the 9th century (Rashtrakuta Dynasty) at Durga Devi temple in Hampi, Karnataka

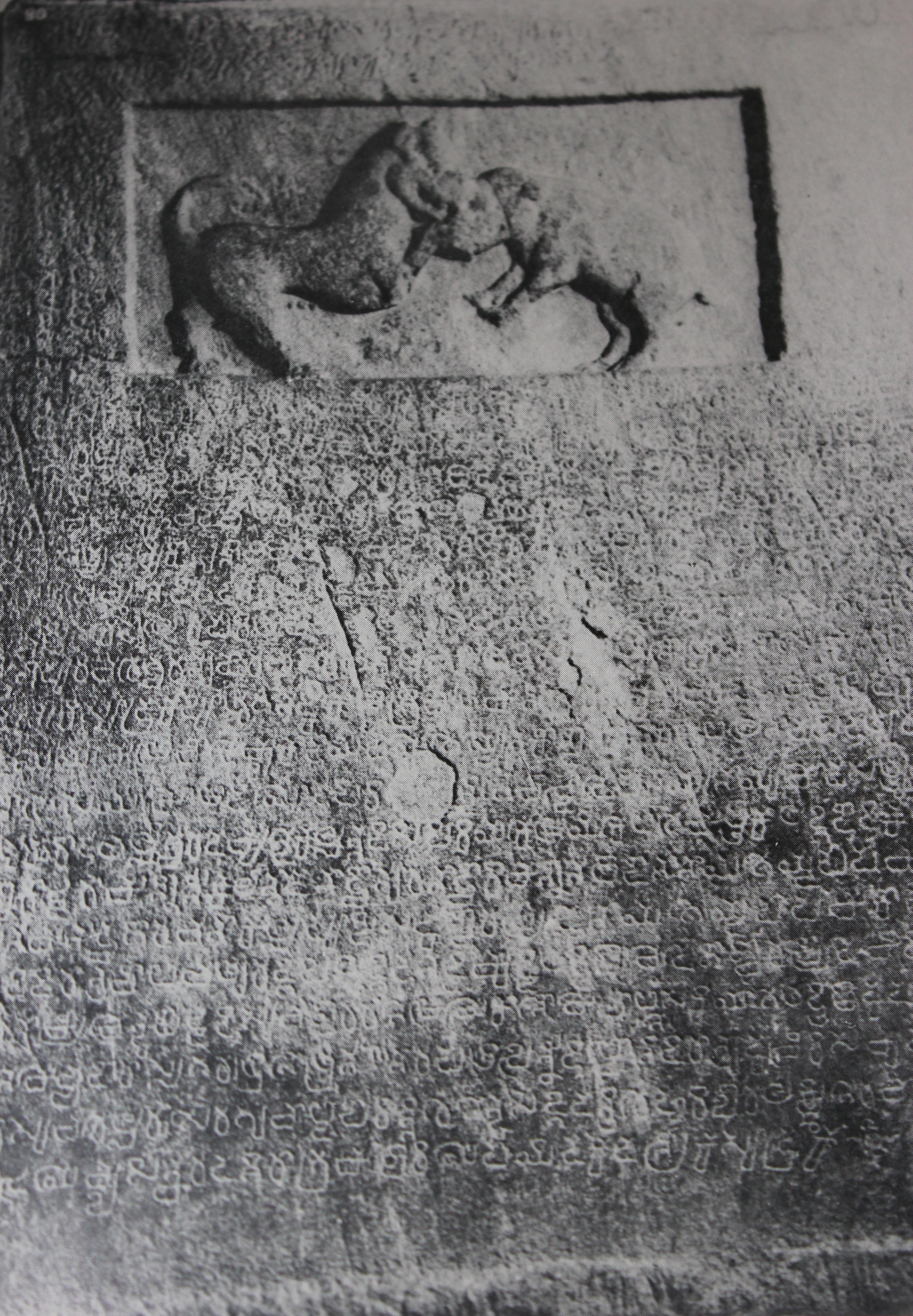
The famous Atakur inscription (AD 949) from Mandya district, a classical Kannada composition in two parts; a fight between a hound and a wild boar, and the victory of the Rashtrakutas over the Chola dynasty in the famous battle of Takkolam

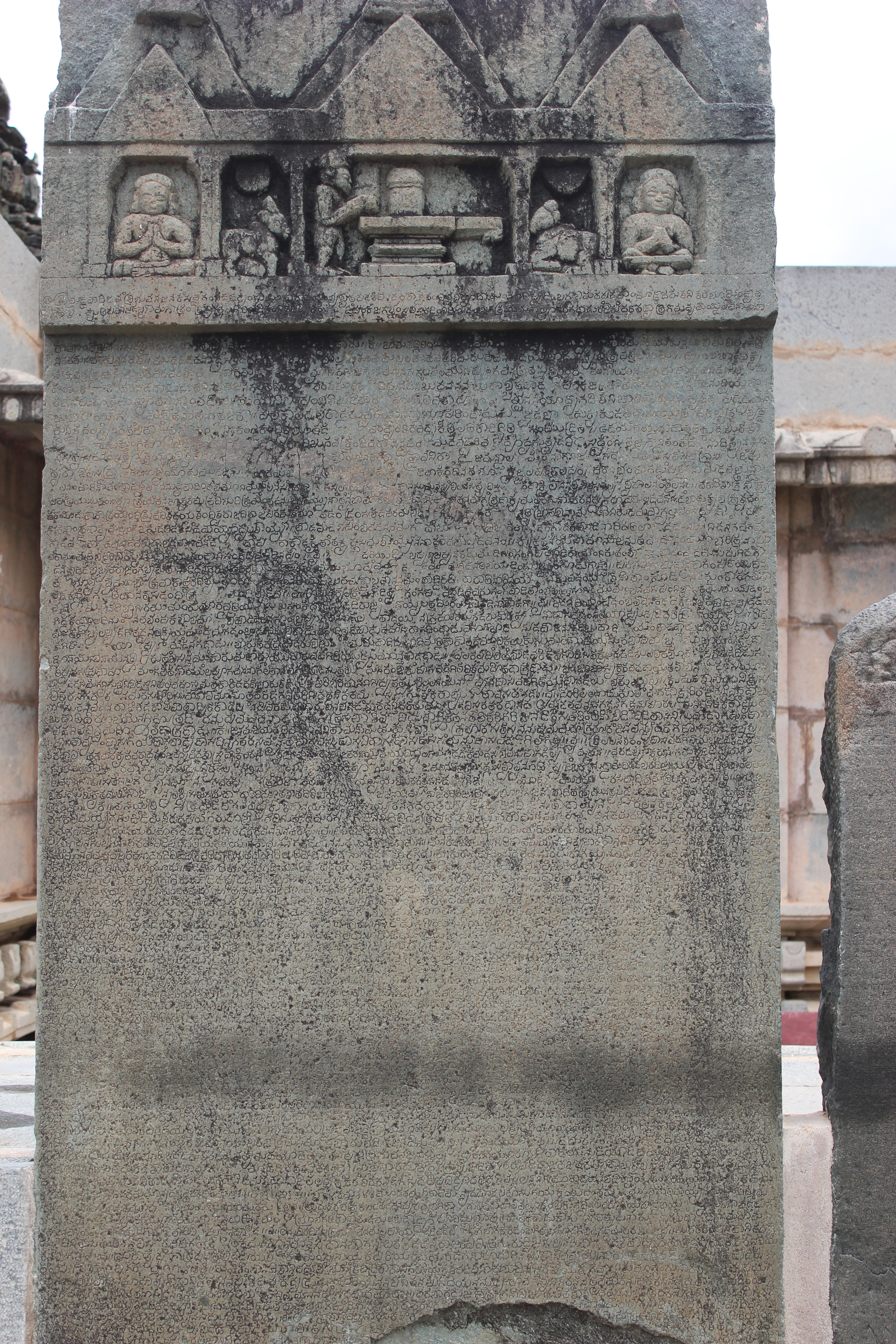
Old Kannada inscription dated 1057 AD of Western Chalukya King Someshvara I at Kalleshwara Temple, Hire Hadagali in Bellary district

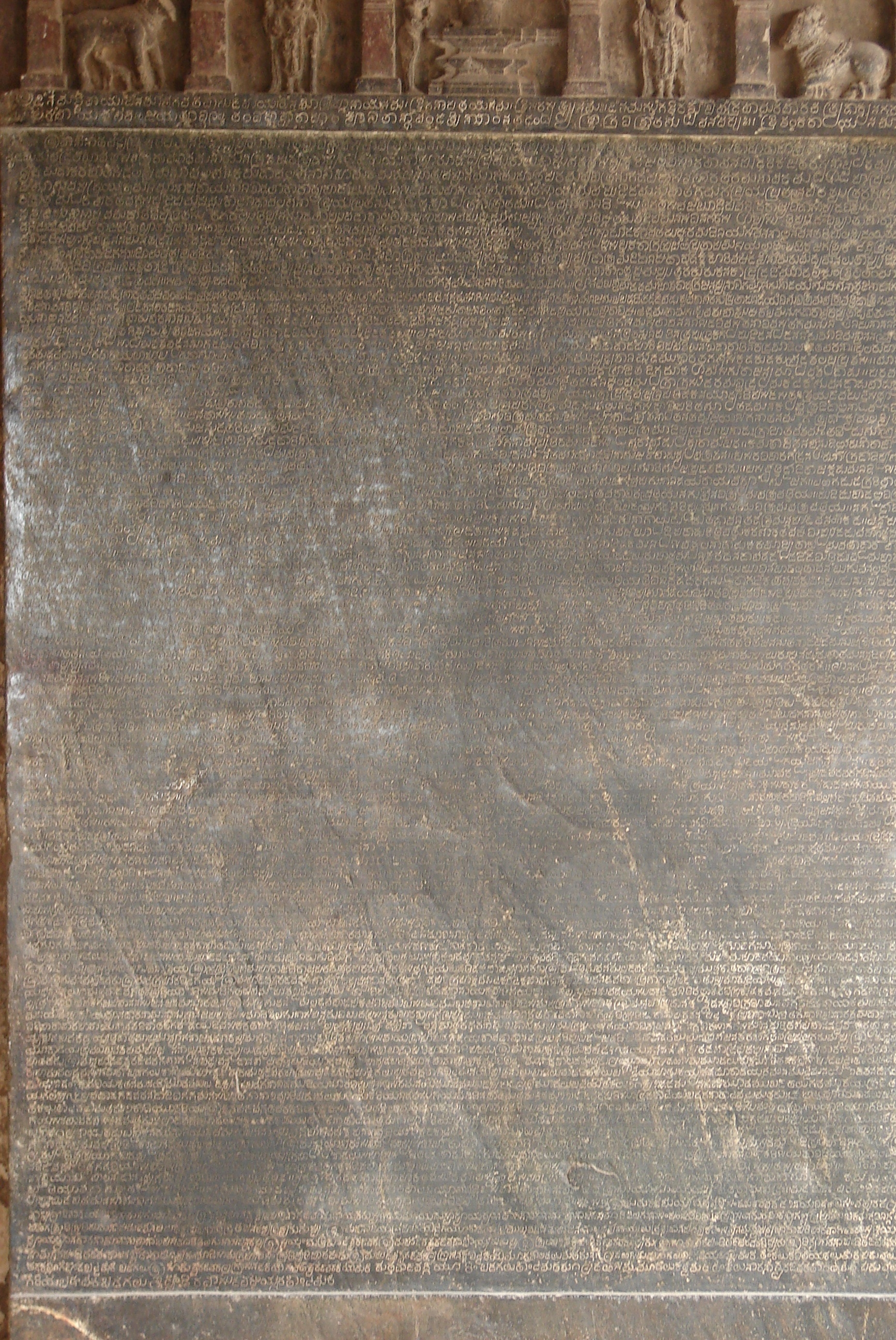
Old-Kannada inscription ascribed to King Vikramaditya VI (Western Chalukya Empire), dated AD 1112, at the Mahadeva Temple in Itagi, Koppal district of Karnataka state

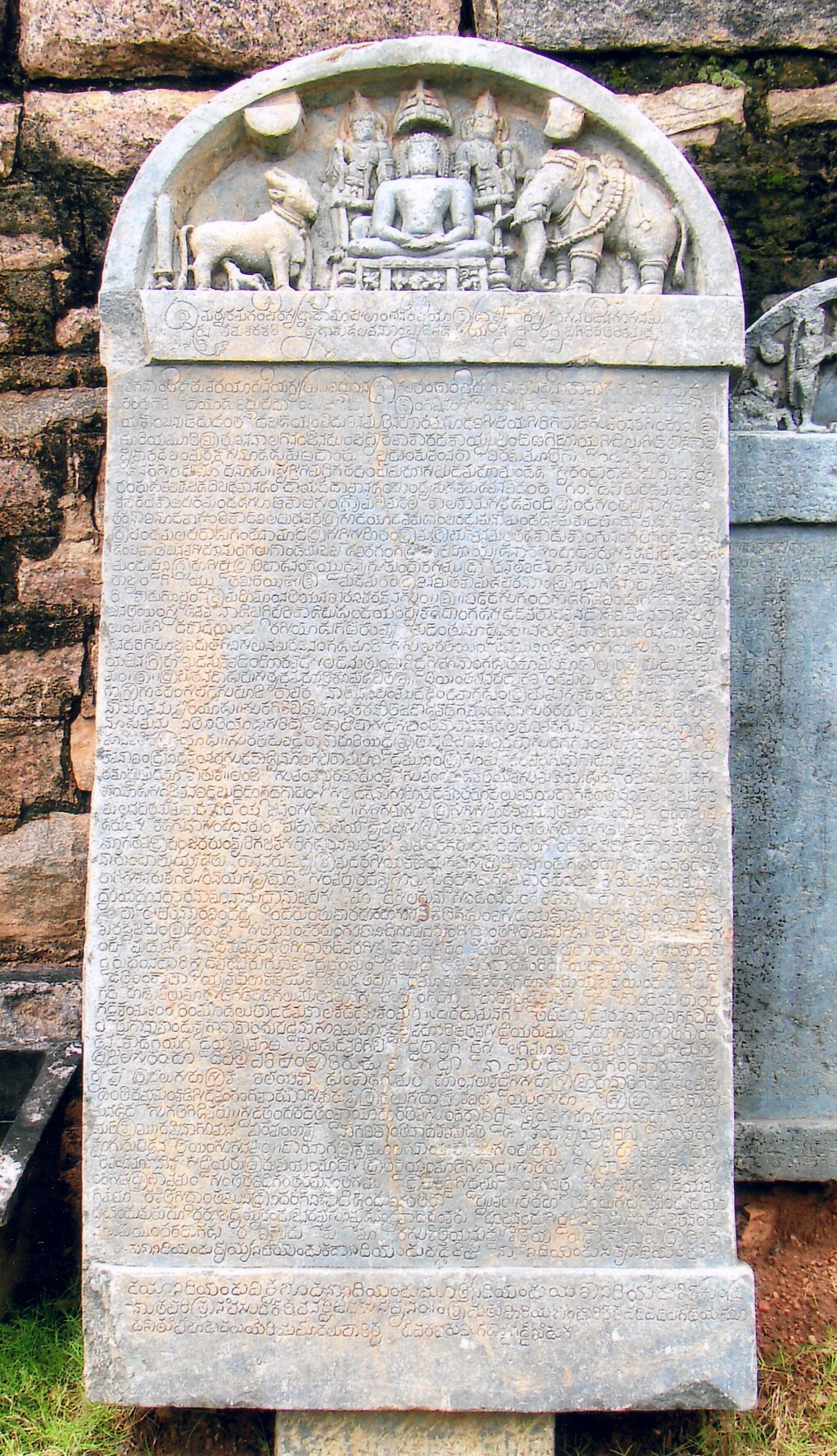
Old-Kannada inscription of 1220 AD (Hoysala Empire) at Ishwara temple of Arasikere town in the Hassan district

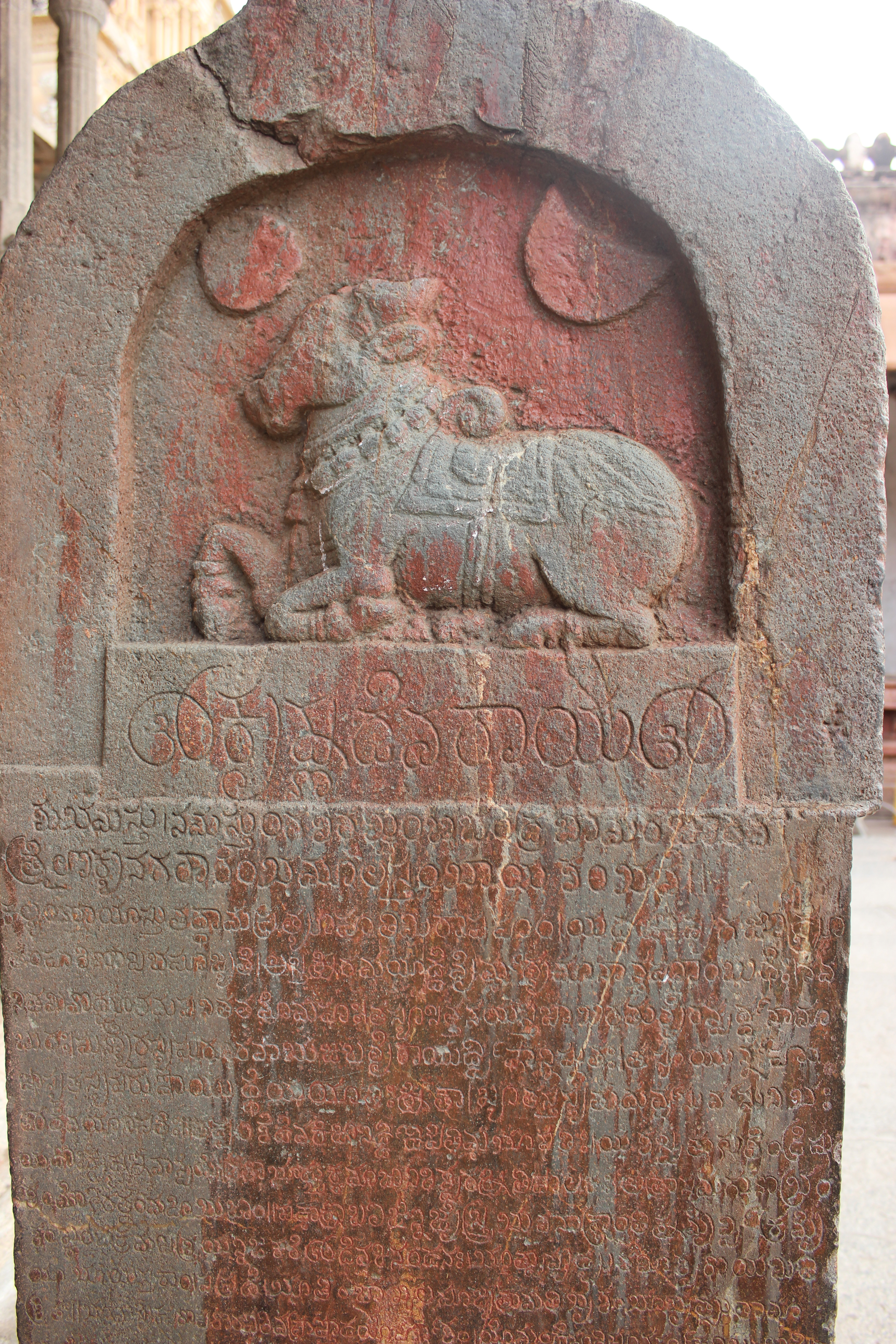
Kannada inscription dated 1509, of King Krishnadevaraya (Vijayanagara Empire), at the Virupaksha temple in Hampi describes his coronation

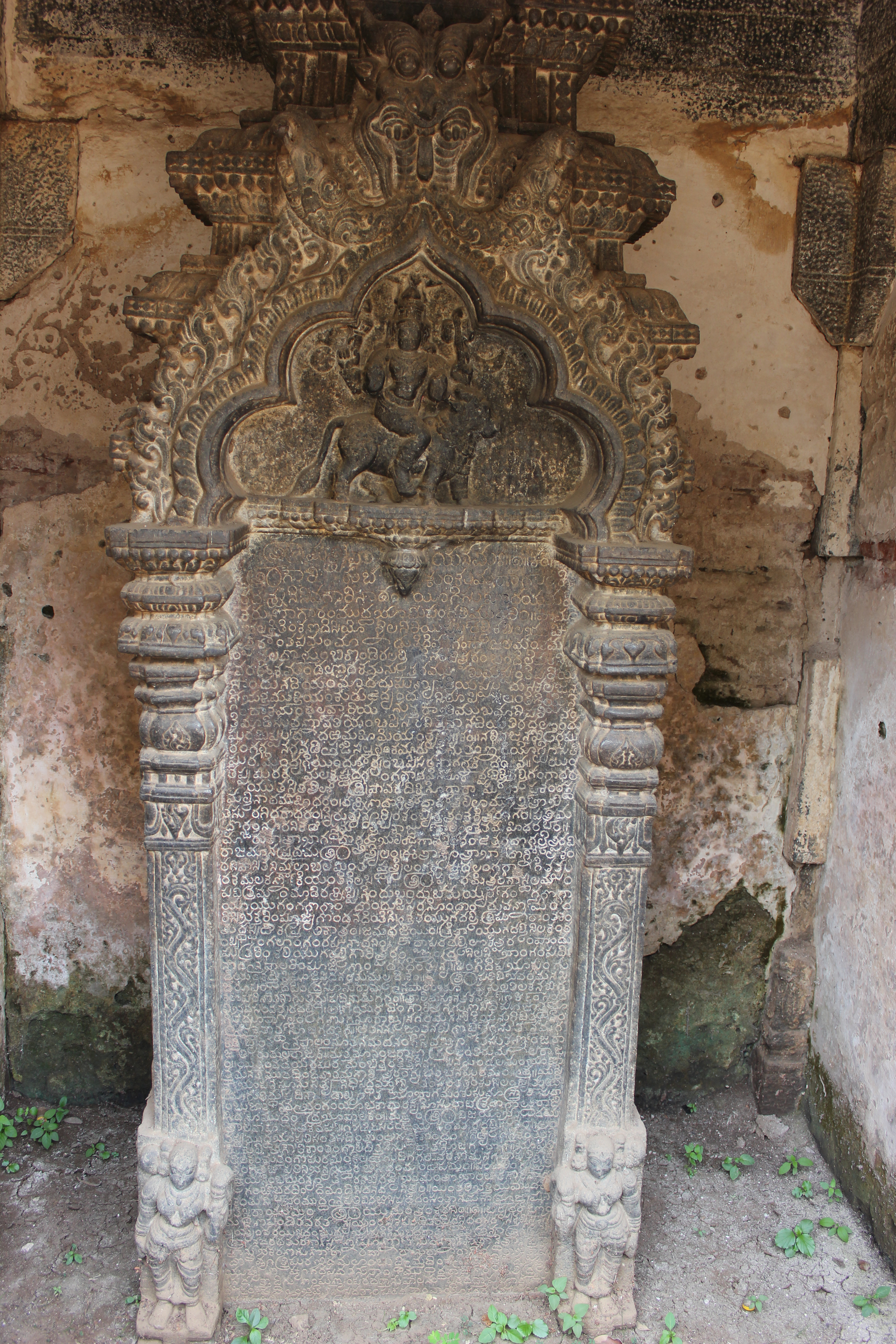
Kannada inscription dated 1654, at Yelandur with exquisite relief

The earliest Kannada inscriptions are from the middle of the 5th century AD, but there are a number of earlier texts that may have been influenced by the ancestor language of Old Kannada.

Iravatam Mahadevan, author of a work on early Tamil epigraphy, argued that oral traditions in Kannada and Telugu existed much before written documents were produced. Although the rock inscriptions of Ashoka were written in Prakrit, the spoken language in those regions was Kannada. He pointed out that Prakrit inscriptions of that period contained large numbers of Kannada personal and place names.

The Ashoka rock edict (c. 250 BCE) found at Brahmagiri contains Kannada words such as words (isila, meaning to fire an arrow in modern Kannada).

Old Kannada words are also found in inscriptions in Northern Tamil Nadu and Kerala First-century Sittanavasal Cave inscriptions contain words such as such as erumi-nadu (a location) and pocil (entrance). Other examples include kaavithi (village officer's wife) from 1st century CE Tirumlai and thaayiyaru (mothers) in the 4th century CE Nekanurpatti inscription..

Extensive trade relations between the Deccan region - comprising janapadas such as the Kuntalas, Mahishakas, Punnatas, Mahabanas, Asmakas, etc.where Prakrit and early South Dravidian dialects including proto-Kannada were spoken - and the Hellenistic, Roman, Egyptian and Greek worlds led to exchange of people and ideas. The claim that The Library of Alexandria supposedly held a Kannada palm-leaf manuscript, suggesting Kannada literature flourished before 285–48 BCE, has been put forward by some Kannada scholars. However, there is no verifiable catalogue or archaeological evidence for such a manuscript in Alexandrian sources, and the claim remains contested among historians. The assertion was cited in the report submitted for Classical Languages of India. Pliny the Elder, a Roman historian, wrote about pirates between Muziris (Chera port city) and the Netravati River, and also mentions Barcelore , possibly modern Mangaluru (a Tulu City presently located in the state of Karnataka) upon its mouth. The Greek geographer Ptolemy (writing c. 150 CE) mentions ten Kannada place names from Northern Karnataka, between Bhima River in the north and Banaouasei (Banavasi) in the south: Nagarouris (Nagur), Tabaso (Tavasi), Inde (Inde), Tiripangalida (Gadhinglaj), Hippokoura (Huvina Hipparagi), Soubouttou (Savadi), Sirimalaga (Malkhed), Kalligeris (Kalkeri), Modogoulla (Mudgal), and Petirgala (Pattadakal).

Pliny also mentions King Sire Polemaios (Vasishthiputra Pulumavi (c. 85–125 AD)), whose name might have derived from Kannada: puli, lit. 'tiger', perhaps indicating a native Kannada origin for the Satavahanas and explaining the presence of Kannada language and culture in the southern Kuntala country during the period when Pulumavi ruled from Paithan in the north and his son or Pulumayi Kumara ruled from Huvina Hipparagi in present Karnataka in the south.

An early ancestor of Kannada (or a related language, possibly Tulu) may have been spoken by Indian traders in Roman-era Egypt and it may account for the Indian-language passages in the ancient Greek play known as the Charition mime.

=== Epigraphy ===
The earliest well-attested example of a full-length Kannada language stone inscription containing Brahmi characters with characteristics of old Kannada script can be found in the Halmidi inscription, usually dated c. 450 AD. Its existence indicates that Kannada had become an administrative language by that time. The Halmidi inscription provides invaluable information about the history and culture of Karnataka.

A set of five copper plate inscriptions discovered in Mudiyanur, though in the Sanskrit language, is written in the Kadamba script. Some epigraphers have suggested that the plates are contemporary with the Halmidi inscription, but detailed study places them more than a century later, in 338 CE.

The 5th century poetic Tamatekallu inscription of Chitradurga and the Siragunda inscription from Chikkamagaluru Taluk of 500 AD are further examples. Recent reports indicate that the Old KannadaGunabhushitana Nishadi inscription discovered on the Chandragiri hill, Shravanabelagola, is older than Halmidi inscription by about fifty to hundred years and may belong to the period AD 350–400. Shravanabelagola is a major Jain pilgrimage centre and an important epigraphic site, with numerous inscriptions useful for the study of Kannada language and literature.

Early Kannada inscriptions have been discovered in Andhra Pradesh and Telangana, Maharashtra, Tamil Nadu, Madhya Pradesh and Gujarat in addition to Karnataka. This indicates the spread of the influence of the language over the ages, especially during the rule of large Kannada empires.

The earliest copper plates inscribed in Old Kannada script and language, date to the early 8th century CE, are associated with Alupa King Aluvarasa II include the double crested fish, his royal emblem.

The oldest well-preserved palm leaf manuscript in Old Kannada is a copy of the Dhavala, dating to around the 9th century. It is preserved in the Jain Bhandar, Mudbidri, Dakshina Kannada. The manuscript contains 1478 leaves written using ink.

=== Coins ===
Some early Kadamba Dynasty coins bearing the Kannada inscription Vira and Skandha were found in Satara collectorate. A gold coin bearing three inscriptions of Sri and an abbreviated inscription of king Bhagiratha's name called bhagi (c. 390–420 AD) in old Kannada exists. A Kadamba copper coin dated to the 5th century AD with the inscription Srimanaragi in Kannada script was discovered in Banavasi, Uttara Kannada district. Coins with Kannada legends have been discovered spanning the rule of the Western Ganga Dynasty, the Badami Chalukyas, the Alupas, the Western Chalukyas, the Rashtrakutas, the Hoysalas, the Vijayanagar Empire, the Kadamba Dynasty of Banavasi, the Keladi Nayakas and the Mysore kingdom, the Badami Chalukya coins being a recent discovery. The coins of the Kadambas of Goa are unique in that they have alternate inscription of the king's name in Kannada and Devanagari in triplicate, a few coins of the Kadambas of Hangal are also available.

== Literature ==
=== Old Kannada ===
The oldest known literary work in Kannada is the Kavirājamārga (ಕವಿರಾಜಮಾರ್ಗಾ, "The Way of Poet-Kings"), a work of literary criticism and poetics meant to establish a literary standard for Kannada. Nṛpatuṅga Amoghavarṣa I (850 CE) is generally the patron of the work, but the precise identity of the text's author has been the subject of scholarly debate. Muliya Timmappaya has suggested that the work was a collaboration between Amoghavarṣa I and one of his court poets, Śrīvijaya. Building on the model of Daṇḍin's Kāvyādarśa (a Sanskrit treatise on poetics widely read across South Asia), the Kavirājamārga presents a systematic overview of meters, literary devices, and language for use in literary Kannada. The work refers to Kannada works by early writers such as King Durvinita of the 6th century and Ravikirti, the author of the Aihole record of 636 CE. The text praises earlier poets and briefly outlines paḻagannaḍa ("old Kannada"), an older form of the language which was regarded as no longer suitable for literature; this suggests the existence of an earlier tradition.

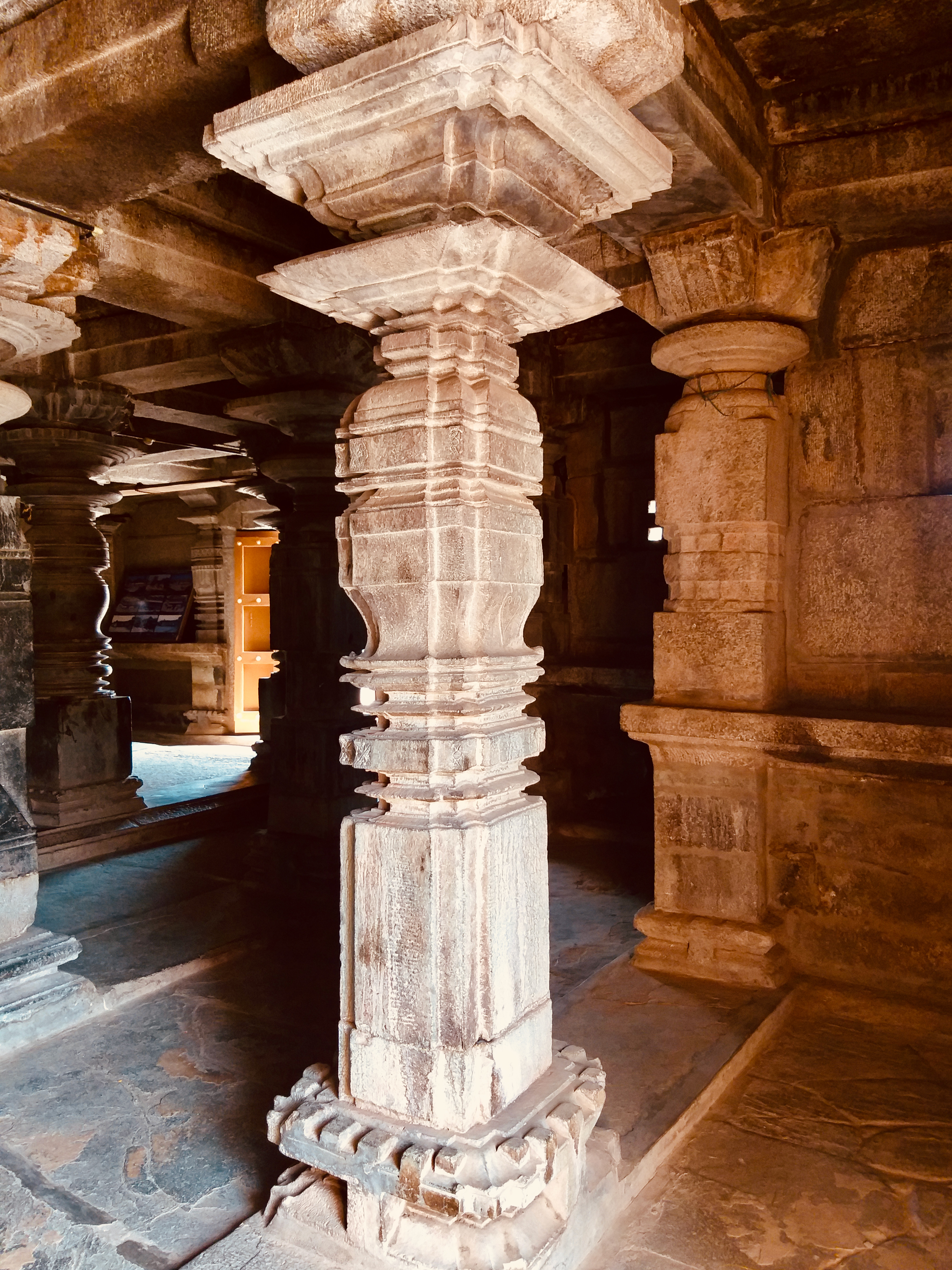
Shankha Jain Basadi temple at Lakshmeshwar where Adikavi Pampa wrote the Ādi purāṇa

Pampa, regarded as "first poet" (ādikavi) of Kannada, was one of the "three gems" (ratnatraya) of Jaina literature and Kannada language, along with Ponna and Ranna; his major works include Vikramārjunavijaya and Ādipurāṇa. These three authors were widely revered throughout the premodern tradition, and were frequently named in the benedictory portions of poetic works that praise earlier and senior poets (kavipraśaṃse). There is also an early extant prose work, the Vaḍḍārādhane (ವಡ್ಡಾರಾಧನೆ) by Shivakotiacharya of 900 CE provides an elaborate description of the life of Jain Acharya Bhadrabahu at Shravanabelagola.

Early Kannada writers regularly mention three poets as of special eminence among their predecessors – Samanta-bhadra, Kavi Parameshthi and Pujyapada. Since later Kannada poets so uniformly name these three as eminent poets, it is probable that they wrote in Kannada also Samantabhadra is placed in the 2nd century CE by Jain tradition. Pujyapada, a renowned grammarian and acharya lived around 510 CE to 600 CE. Kaviparameshthi probably lived in the 4th century CE.

The work also mentions earlier composition forms peculiar to Kannada, such as gadyakathā, cattāṇan and bedaṇḍe. Some of these styles included several stanzas that were meant to be sung with the accompaniment of musical instrument. The oldest known existing record of Kannada poetry in tripadi metre is the Kappe Arabhatta, a verse inscription of the eponymous Chalukya warrior, inscribed c. 700 CE. In the Old Kannada period (8th-12th century CE), the campū was the dominant literary form. Most of the Jaina works of this period are campūs, such as the Vikramārjunavijaya of Pampa (also known as the Pampabhārata), the Śāntipurāṇa of Ponna, and the Gadāyuddha (also known as the Sāhasabhīmavijaya) of Ranna.

The turn of the second millennium saw great innovations in poetic style, including the ragaḷe (a type of couplet popularised by Harihara), sāṅgatya (a style developed for musical performance) and ṣaṭpadi (a six-line form whose earliest use is by Rāghavāṅka). The vacana sāhitya tradition also emerged at this time, being distinctly unassociated with the forms and practices of courtly literature. This corpus features broadly Śaiva religious, mystical, and devotional themes, which later served as an important part of the Vīraśaiva tradition. Some of the important writers of vacana literature include Basavanna, Allama Prabhu and Akka Mahadevi. Writing predominantly in the common form of Kannada, the vacana literature was a critical phase in the transition of the Kannada literature broadly to its Middle Kannada phase.

=== Middle Kannada ===
Between the 13th and 18th centuries CE, local devotional traditions of Hinduism had become prominent social presences in South India. This had a great influence on the literature of Middle Kannada (ನಡುಗನ್ನಡ, naḍugannaḍa), as a great deal of literature began to deal with devotional themes. Harihara, writing in the 13th century CE, began the Śaiva hagiographic tradition in Kannada, being followed by his nephew Rāghavaṅka and others.

The Haridāsas of the Mādhva Vaiṣṇava tradition, such as Kanakadāsa, Purandaradāsa, Naraharitīrtha, Vyāsatīrtha, Srīpādarāya, and Vādirājatīrtha were prominent in this period. The haridasa sāhitya ("literature of the servants of Hari") played a major role in popularising bhakti literature, especially in the form of music. Purandara Dasa is widely considered the main predecessor of Carnatic music. Forms associated with music generally became more popular, particularly the sāṅgatya.

Kumara Vyasa, who wrote the Karṇāṭa Bhārata Kathāman̄jari (ಕರ್ಣಾಟ ಭಾರತ ಕಥಾಮಂಜರಿ), was widely celebrated for his decision to write in the Kannada of his time rather than imitating the language of earlier masters. His work, entirely composed in bhāmini ṣaṭpadi, is an adaptation of the first ten books of the Mahabharata. During this period, several Hindi and Marathi words came into Kannada, chiefly relating to feudalism and militia.

=== Modern Kannada ===
By the 19th century, Modern Kannada had emerged as its own literary idiom, shaped by the influences of colonial education and native literary practice. Kannada writers such as Vinayaka took to Western literary forms, including the novel and non-native metrical forms. The Navōdaya (modernist) poet Da Rā Bēndre wrote in 1940 that "individuality is the characteristic of the age", arguing for Kannada literature to speak about individuals rather than traditions or communities. Among Kannada's many renowned writers, Kuvempu is widely regarded as one of the greatest Kannada writers of his generation. Mamta Sagar writes that Kuvempu, along with other writers of "Kannada romanticism", were strongly influenced by the rise of English language education in colonial Mysore.

Even as this modernist movement developed, a number of poets and scholars in the court of Mysore continued to write new works in classical style. One such writer was Siddhānti Śivaśaṅkara Śāstri, who belonged to a lineage of palace scholars going back to Kuṇigaḷa Rāmaśāstri. Women also began to publish more widely, exemplified by Nanjangud Tirumalamba, who wrote a number of plays and novels, and established her own publishing house, Sati Hitaiṣini.

In the 1970s, the "Boosa" movement saw strong criticism of earlier Kannada writers (including Kuvempu) for ignoring the enduring reality of caste discrimination and other social issues. Contemporary Kannada literature has generally been characterised by an interest in social criticism. In the 20th century CE, there have been several distinct movements in Kannada literature, including the modernist Navodaya and Navya, the radical Dalita and the progressive Bandaya.

Works of Kannada literature have received eight Jnanpith Awards, the highest number awarded to any Indian language. Banu Mushtaq's Heart Lamp won the first International Booker Prize in 2025.

=== Dictionaries ===
The oldest known Kannada-Kannada, dictionary, Ranna Kanda was composed by the poet Ranna in 996 AD. Other pre-modern Kannada dictionaries include Abhidanavastukosa, a dictionary of Sanskrit words for Kannada users, composed in 1054 by Nagavarma and 'Abhinavaabhidaana', by Abhinava Mangaraja (1398). Missionary Ferdinand Kittel published a Kannada–English dictionary of more than 70,000 words. and A Grammar of the Kannada language in English (1903).

G. Venkatasubbiah edited the first modern Kannada–Kannada dictionary, the 9,000-page, 8-volume Kannaḍa nighaṇṭu, published by Sahitya Parishat. He also wrote a Kannada–English dictionary and a dictionary of difficult words.

== Dialects ==
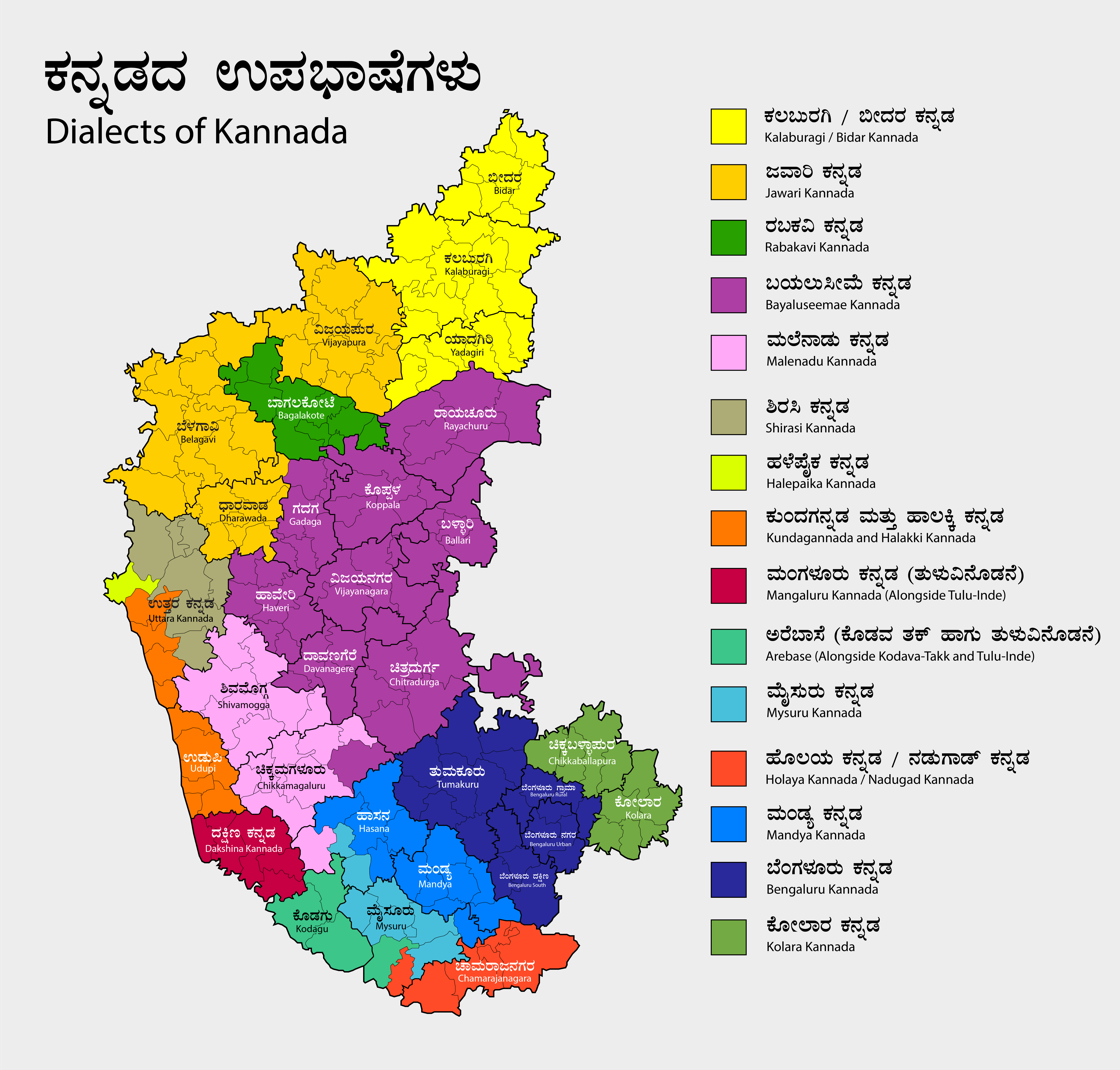
Map of Kannada dialects in the state of Karnataka.

There is considerable difference between the spoken and written forms of the language. Modern standard Kannada and its written form, primarily based on the Mysore–Bangalore variety, is more or less consistent throughout Karnataka. Spoken Kannada tends to vary from region to region, though most dialects remain mutually intelligible. Linguists broadly group Kannada dialects into Southern, Northern, Central, and Coastal varieties, though the boundaries between them often overlap.. Northern Kannada dialects preserve older phonological features not found in southern dialects. Coastal dialects show lexical influence from Tulu and Konkani due to prolonged language contact.

Dialects of Kannada language fall into include:

Coastal

- Mangalore Kannada
- Halakki Kannada (Halakki Vokkaligas of Uttara Kannada and Shimoga).
- Havigannada (used mainly by Havyaka Brahmins)
- Kundagannada (Kundapura, Brahmavara, Bynduru and Hebri)
- Nador-Kannada (used by Nador (caste))
- Halegannada (spoken by Komarpant in Goa, Uttara Kannada and Khanapur, Karnataka.
- Hatkar - a conservative dialect that preserves many Old Kannada terms, spoken by Hatkars in the Nasik district, Maharashtra. Kannada speakers formed 0.12% of Nasik district's population as per 1961 census.

Northern

- Dharwad (Dharwad, Belagavi, Haveri, and Gadag) - preserves some older phonological features not found in southern dialects.

South-Western

- Arebhashe (Spoken in the Gowda community, mainly in Madikeri and Sullia)

Southern

- Bengaluru Kannada
- Banakal Kannada

== Writing system ==
The language uses forty-nine phonemic letters, divided into three groups: swaragalu (vowels – thirteen letters); vyanjanagalu (consonants – thirty-four letters); and yogavaahakagalu (neither vowel nor consonant – two letters: anusvara ಂ and visarga ಃ). The character set is almost identical to that of other Indian languages. The Kannada script is almost entirely phonetic, but for the sound of a "half n" (which becomes a half m). The number of written symbols, however, is far more than the forty-nine characters in the alphabet, because different characters can be combined to form compound characters (ottakshara). Each written symbol in the Kannada script corresponds with one syllable, as opposed to one phoneme in languages like English—the Kannada script is syllabic.

== Phonology ==
Spoken Kannada

=== Consonants ===
| | | Labial | Dental/ alveolar | Retroflex | Post-alv./ palatal | Velar | Glottal |
|---|---|---|---|---|---|---|---|
| Nasal | | m (ಮ) | n (ನ) | ɳ (ಣ) | (ɲ) (ಞ) | (ŋ) (ಙ) | |
| Plosive/ Affricate | voiceless | p (ಪ) | t̪ (ತ) | ʈ (ಟ) | tʃ (ಚ) | k (ಕ) | |
| Plosive/ Affricate | aspirated | pʰ (ಫ) | t̪ʰ (ಥ) | ʈʰ (ಠ) | tʃʰ (ಛ) | kʰ (ಖ) | |
| Plosive/ Affricate | voiced | b (ಬ) | d̪ (ದ) | ɖ (ಡ) | dʒ (ಜ) | ɡ (ಗ) | |
| Plosive/ Affricate | breathy | bʱ (ಭ) | d̪ʱ (ಧ) | ɖʱ (ಢ) | dʒʱ (ಝ) | ɡʱ (ಘ) | |
| Fricative | | | s (ಸ) | ʂ (ಷ) | ʃ (ಶ) | | h (ಹ) |
| Approximant | | ʋ (ವ) | l (ಲ) | ɭ (ಳ) | j (ಯ) | | |
| Rhotic | | | ɾ (ರ) | | | | |

- Most consonants can be geminated.
- [ŋ, ɲ] are allophones before other palatal and velar consonants respectively.
- Aspirated consonants very rarely occur in native vocabulary only in a few numerals like the number 9 and 80, which can be written with a /bʱ/, as in ombhattu, embhattu. However, it is usually written with a /b/, as in ombattu, embattu; they formed from the Proto Dravidian laryngeal *H, like in Telugu. Most of the aspirated words are loanwords and the aspiration of consonants depends entirely on the speaker and many do not do it in non-formal situations.
- In old Kannada at around 10th-14th century, most of the initial /p/ debuccalised into a /h/ e.g. OKn. paḍagu, balupu, keḍapu, Kn. haḍahu, baluhu, {keḍavu, keḍahu} "ship, strength, to pull down".
- The proto Dravidian laryngeal sporadically appears in middle Kannada, eg. ahaṅge/hāṅge < PD. *aH-, after h got natively phonemised.
- Middle Kannada RP, RB > Modern Kannada P:, B:, mostly formed from deletion of the second vowel in the syllable form -VCVP- > -VCP- (note that old ḻ became r in clusters), similarly to other nearby languages like Telugu but unlike literary Tamil and Malayalam which largely preserved them, eg. Tamil iruppai, Middle Kannada irpe, Modern Kannada ippe.
- The alveolar trill /r/ may be pronounced as an alveolar tap [ɾ].
- The voiceless retroflex sibilant /ʂ/ is commonly pronounced as a /ʃ/ except in consonant clusters with retroflex consonants.
- There are also the consonants /f, z/ which occur in recent English and Perso-Arabic loans but they may be replaced by the consonants /pʰ, dʒ/ respectively by speakers.
- Some northern Kannada dialects have developed a /ts, dz, tʃ, dʒ/ distinction like in Marathi, Telugu and Southern Odia.

Additionally, Kannada included the following phonemes, which dropped out of common usage in the 12th and 18th century respectively:

- /r/ ಱ (ṟ), the alveolar trill.
- /ɻ/ ೞ (ḻ), the retroflex central approximant.

Old Kannada had an archaic phoneme /ɻ/ under retroflexes in early inscriptions that merged with /ɭ/ intervocalically or /r/ in clusters and it maintained the contrast between /r/ (< PD ∗ṯ) and /ɾ/ from (< PD ∗r). Both merged in Medieval Kannada.

Historically, the Tamil-Malayalam languages and, independently, Telugu, phonemically palatalised /k/ before a front vowel; Kannada never developed such phonemic palatalisation (cf. Kn. /kiʋi/, Ta. /seʋi/, Te. /tʃeʋi/ "ear"); however, phonetically, Kannada speakers frequently palatalise velar consonants before front vowels, for example, realising /kiʋi/ "ear" as [ciʋi] and /ɡiɭi/ "parrot" as [ɟiɭi].

Kannada and other languages like Telugu simplified NP, NPP into NB, NP and later on {-V:NC-, -V:C:-}, -VCVC:- into -V:C-, -VCVC-, eg. PD. *ampu, *eṇṭṭu, *āṭu, *āṭṭu, *tōṇṭṭampu, Kn. ambu, eṇṭu, āḍu, āṭu, tōṇṭa > tōṭa.

=== Vowels ===
| | Front | | Central | | Back | |
| | short | long | short | long | short | long |
|---|---|---|---|---|---|---|
| Close | i (ಇ) | iː (ಈ) | | | u (ಉ) | uː (ಊ) |
| Mid | e (ಎ) | eː (ಏ) | | | o (ಒ) | oː (ಓ) |
| Open | | | a (ಅ) | aː (ಆ) | | |

- /ɐ/ and /aː/ are phonetically central [ɐ, äː]. /ɐ/ may be as open as /aː/ ([ä]) or higher [ɐ].
- The vowels /i iː e eː/ may be preceded by /j/ and the vowels /u uː o oː/ may be preceded by /ʋ/ when they are in an initial position.
- The short vowels /a i u e o/, when in an initial or a medial position tend to be pronounced as [ɐ ɪ ʊ ɛ ɔ]. In a final position, this phenomenon occurs less frequently.
- /æː/ occurs in English loans but can be switched with /aː/ or /ja:/.

At around the 8th century, Kannada raised the vowels e, o to i, u when before a short consonant and a high vowel, before written literature emerged in the language, e.g. Kn. kivi, Ta. cevi, Te. cevi "ear".

=== Colloquial speech ===
Sources:

- Initial i/e have a y- onset and w- for u/o.
- In many dialects, e/o gets lowered to [æ, ɔ] when followed by non high vowels. Some dialects have /a/ as [ə] when a high vowel comes after it and [a] elsewhere.
- Final -e's become i's, in the south its mostly with verbs but in the north it happens everywhere, eg. bere > bære > bæri. This along with the previous change can create some surface minimal pairs, eg. [bæ:ɖə] "don't" vs [be:ɖə] "ask!" (conj of /be:ɖu/).

== Grammar ==
The canonical word order of Kannada is SOV (subject–object–verb), typical of Indian languages. Kannada is a highly inflected language with three genders (masculine, feminine, and neuter or common) and two numbers (singular and plural). It is inflected for gender, number and tense, among other things. The first available Kannada book, a treatise on poetics, rhetoric and basic grammar is the Kavirajamarga from 850 AD.

The most influential account of Kannada grammar is Keshiraja's Shabdamanidarpana (c. 1260 AD). The earlier grammatical works include portions of Kavirajamarga (a treatise on alańkāra) of the 9th century, and Kavyavalokana and Karnatakabhashabhushana (both authored by Nagavarma II in the first half of the 12th century).

=== Compound bases ===
Compound bases, called samāsa in Kannada, are a set of two or more words compounded together. There are several types of compound bases, based on the rules followed for compounding. The types of compound bases or samāsas: tatpurusha, karmadhāraya, dvigu, bahuvreehi, anshi, dvandva, kriya and gamaka samāsa. Examples: taṅgāḷi, hemmara, kannusanne.

=== Pronouns ===
In many ways the third-person pronouns are more like demonstratives than like the other pronouns. They are pluralised like nouns and the first- and second-person pronouns have different ways to distinguish number.

== Significance to modern linguistics ==
While an early account of Kannada's grammar is available in Shabdamanidarpana, it has played a central role in the modern linguistics thanks to its unique semantic and syntactic properties that have been significant to studies of language acquisition and innateness. Jeff Lidz is a significant Western linguist to have studied Kannada. His investigations found at least two properties of Kannada to be very impactful in developing contemporary understandings of language acquisition. The first observation was that Kannada has a causative morpheme (like -ify for English, in personify or deify), which appears whenever a verb with causative meaning is expressed. This was significant, because it allowed him to test whether an observation of English-learning infants, that they worked out novel verb meanings based on the number of overt NPs they took, applied cross-linguistically. Given that the presence of the aforementioned causative morpheme would be a more obvious and reliable indicator for differentiating meanings, Kannada was a perfect language to test this observation; Lidz et al. (2003) found that Kannada-learning infants relied more heavily on the number of overt NPs than the presence of the causative morpheme. This has been used by generativists and UG nativists to argue that verb meaning acquisition based on syntactic bootstrapping is language universal and innate.

The second property of major significance to develop in modern linguistic understandings lies in the fact that in Kannada, negation comes at the end of the sentence and the quantified object linearly precedes it. This means there is no capacity for confounding linear order and hierarchical relations, as there is in English. This can be used to test whether the observation for English-speaking infants of considering hierarchical organisation more than linear order when deciding scope ambiguity is cross-linguistic, or just a product of English's confounded linear order. Specifically, analysing the sentence "I didn't read two books" (in Kannada), if what matters is linear order, Kannada speaking children's preferred interpretation would be one where 'two books' has wider scope than negation (i.e., there are two books I did not read), and if what matters is hierarchical organisation, their preferred interpretation would be the opposite (i.e., that it is not the case that I read two books). Lidz and Musolino (2002) found that they prefer the second, hierarchical interpretation, just like English-speaking children. This observation has been used to argue that infants universally represent sentences not as mere strings of adjacent words, but as hierarchical objects, an important point among Chomskyans and nativists.

== Sample text ==
The given sample text is Article 1 from the United Nations Universal Declaration of Human Rights.

=== English ===
All human beings are born free and equal in dignity and rights. They are endowed with reason and conscience and should act towards one another in a spirit of brotherhood.

=== Kannada ===
ಎಲ್ಲಾ ಮಾನವರು ಸ್ವತಂತ್ರರಾಗಿ ಹುಟ್ಟಿದ್ದಾರೆ ಹಾಗೂ ಘನತೆ ಮತ್ತು ಅಧಿಕಾರಗಳಲ್ಲಿ ಸಮಾನರಾಗಿದ್ದಾರೆ. ತಿಳಿವು ಮತ್ತು ಅಂತಃಸಾಕ್ಷಿಯನ್ನು ಹೊಂದಿದವರಾದ್ದರಿಂದ, ಅವರು ಒಬ್ಬರಿಗೊಬ್ಬರು ಸಹೋದರ ಭಾವದಿಂದ ನಡೆದುಕೊಳ್ಳಬೇಕು.

=== Romanisation (ISO 15919) ===
Ellā mānavaru svatantrarāgiyē huṭṭiddāre hāgu ghanate mattu adhikāragaḷalli samānarāgiddāre. Tiḷivu mattu antaḥsākṣīyannu paḍedavarāddarinda avaru obbarigobbaru sahōdara bhāvadinda naḍedukoḷḷabēku.

=== IPA ===
/ellaː maːn̪ɐʋɐɾu sʋɐt̪ɐn̪t̪ɾɐɾaːɡijeː huʈʈid̪d̪aːɾe haːɡu gʱɐn̪ɐt̪e mɐt̪t̪u ɐd̪ʱikaːɾɐɡɐɭɐlli sɐmaːn̪ɐɾaːɡid̪d̪aːɾe ǁ t̪iɭiʋu mɐt̪t̪u ɐn̪t̪ɐkkɐɾɐɳɐɡɐɭɐn̪n̪u pɐɖed̪ɐʋɐraːd̪d̪ɐɾin̪d̪ɐ ɐʋɐɾu obbɐɾiɡobbɐɾu sɐhoːd̪ɐɾɐ bʱaːʋɐd̪in̪d̪ɐ n̪ɐɖed̪ukoɭɭɐbeːku ǁ/

== See also ==
- Bangalore Kannada
- Gokak agitation
- Hermann Mögling
- Kannada cinema
- Kannada dialects
- Kannada flag
- Kannada in computing
- Kuvempu
- List of Kannada-language radio stations
- List of Karnataka literature
- List of languages by number of native speakers in India
- Siribhoovalaya
- Timeline of Karnataka
- Yakshagana

== Bibliography ==
- Bhat, Thirumaleshwara (1993). Govinda Pai. Sahitya Akademi. ISBN 978-81-7201-540-4.
- Encyclopaedia of Indian literature-vol 2. Sahitya Akademi. 1988. ISBN 978-81-260-1194-0.
- Garg, Ganga Ram (1992). "Kannada literature". Encyclopaedia of the Hindu World. New Delhi: Concept Publishing Company. ISBN 978-81-7022-374-0.
- Kamath, Suryanath U. (2002) [2001]. A concise history of Karnata.k.a. from pre-historic times to the present. Bangalore: Jupiter books. LCCN 80905179. OCLC 7796041.
- Kittel, F (1993). A Grammar of the Kannada Language Comprising the Three Dialects of the Language (Ancient, Medieval and Modern). New Delhi, Madras: Asian Educational Services. ISBN 978-81-206-0056-0.
- Kloss, Heinz; McConnell, Grant D. (1978). The Written languages of the world: a survey of the degree and modes of use. Vol. 2 part 1. Université Laval. ISBN 978-2-7637-7186-1.
- Kuiper, Kathleen, ed. (2011). "Dravidian Studies: Kannada". Understanding India-The Culture of India. New York: Britannica educational Printing. ISBN 978-1-61530-203-1.
- Narasimhacharya, R. (1988). History of Kannada Literature. New Delhi, Madras: Asian Educational Services. ISBN 978-81-206-0303-5.
- Narasimhacharya, R. (1934). History of Kannada Language. University of Mysore.
- Ramesh, K. V. (1984). Chalukyas of Vatapi. New Delhi: Agam Kala Prakashan.
- Rice, E. P. (1982) [1921]. Kannada Literature. New Delhi: Asian Educational Services. ISBN 978-81-206-0063-8.
- Rice, B. L. (2001) [1897]. Mysore Gazetteer Compiled for Government-vol 1. New Delhi, Madras: Asian Educational Services. ISBN 978-81-206-0977-8.
- Sastri, Nilakanta K.A. (2002) [1955]. A history of South India from prehistoric times to the fall of Vijayanagar. New Delhi: Indian Branch, Oxford University Press. ISBN 978-0-19-560686-7.
- Shapiro, Michael C.; Schiffman, Harold F. (1981). Language And Society in South Asia. New Delhi: Motilal Banarsidass Publishers. ISBN 978-81-208-2607-6.
- Steever, S. B. (1998). "Kannada". In Steever, S. B. (ed.). The Dravidian Languages. Routledge Language Family Descriptions. London: Routledge. pp. 129–157. ISBN 978-0-415-10023-6.
- Zvelebil, Kamil (1973). Smile of Murugan: On Tamil Literature of South India. Leiden, Netherlands: Brill. ISBN 978-90-04-03591-1.
