= Gazetteer of the Bombay Presidency =

Historical publication of the British Raj

Gazetteer of the Bombay Presidency is a publication of the erstwhile British India first published in the year 1884 and printed at the Government Central Press, Bombay (now Mumbai) in 1884. Since the early 19th Century the English East India Company and later the British Empire annexed most of Western India and collectively named the provinces in Western India as Bombay Presidency.

Each volume in the publications consists of the historic, geographic and demographic information of the numerous British and princely states under the presidency. The general editor of the first edition was James Macnabb Campbell.

== Volumes ==
- Volume 1, Part 1 History of Gujarat 1896
- Volume 1, Part 2 History of the Konkan, Dakhan and Southern Maratha Country 1896
- Volume 2 Gujarat, Surat and Broach 1877
- Volume 3 Kaira and Panch Mahals 1879
- Volume 4 Ahmedabad 1879
- Volume 5 Cutch, Palanpur and Mahi Kantha 1883
- Volume 6 Rewa Kantha, Narukot, Cambay and Surat States 1880
- Volume 7 Baroda 1883
- Volume 8 Kathiawar 1884
- Volume 9, Part 1 Gujarat Population Hindus 1901
- Volume 9, Part 2 Gujarat Population Musalmans and Parsis 1899
- Volume 10 Ratnagiri and Savantvadi 1880
- Volume 11, Kolaba and Janjira 1883
- Volume 12 Khandesh 1880
- Volume 13, Part 1 Thana 1882
- Volume 13, Part 2 Thana 1882
- Volume 14 Thana Places of Interest 1882
- Volume 15, Part 1 Kanara 1883
- Volume 15, Part 2 Kanara 1893
- Volume 16 Nasik 1883
- Volume 17 Ahmadnagar 1884
- Volume 18, Part 1 Poona 1885
- Volume 18, Part 2 Poona 1885
- Volume 18, Part 3 Poona 1885
- Volume 19 Satara 1885
- Volume 20 Sholapur 1884
- Volume 21 Belgaum 1884
- Volume 22 Dharwar 1884
- Volume 23 Bijapur 1884
- Volume 24 Kolhapur 1886
- Volume 25 Botany 1886
- Volume 26, Part 1 Materials towards a statistical account of the Town and Island of Bombay - History 1893
- Volume 26, Part 2 Materials towards a statistical account of the Town and Island of Bombay - Trade and Fortifications 1894
- Volume 26, Part 3 Materials towards a statistical account of the Town and Island of Bombay - Administration 1894
- Volume 27 General Index 1904

All of these volumes are available free to read online at the Internet Archive via the links above.

=== Volume 1, Part I ===
Part I consists of

- History of Gujarat
- History of other minor states - Sholapur, Belgaum, etc.

=== Volume 1, Part II ===
Part II consists of five books, namely;

- Book I - History of The Konkan, By The Reverend Alexander Kyd Nairne.
- Book II - Early History Of The Dakhan down to the Mahomedan Conquest, By Professor Ramkrishna Gopal Bhandarkar
- Book III - The Dynasties of the Kanarese Districts of The Bombay Presidency from the earliest historical times to the Musalman Conquest, By John Faithfull Fleet
- Book IV - Dakhan History, Musalman and Maratha, AD 1300–1818, Part I-Poona Satara and Sholapur, Part II-Khandesh Nashik and Ahmadnagar, By W.W.Loch
- Book V - History of the Bombay Karnataka, Musalman and Maratha, A.D 1300–1818, Colonel E.W.West
