= Kannada in computing =

Main Page of Kannada Wikipedia

The Kannada language has come a long way in the computing field starting from initial software related to desktop publishing to portals and internet applications in the current age. Kannada is the official language of the state of Karnataka in India whose capital city of Bangalore is known as the Silicon Valley of India. Kannada also entered the Wikipedia world when Kannada Wikipedia was started in September 2004.

== History ==
In the mid-1980s, software development in Kannada was started mainly to meet the needs of desktop publishing in Kannada. In those days, the Kannada keyboard was non-existent and existing English keyboard was used to enter Kannada characters. Shabdaratna, Venus, Prakashak, and Sediyapu were some of the Kannada editing software that were developed in those days. They started the era where computers started to replace typewriters and typesettings for Kannada publications. These were joined by more advanced software like Srilipi and Akruti which were Windows compatible. Shabdaratna was released with an advanced version called Winkey and another editing software called Surabhi was also released.

In the mid-1990s, Windows started to replace DOS as the operating system of choice. The biggest customer for Kannada software was the Government of Karnataka. Each piece of Kannada software was developed using a specific format, and hence portability of data across applications proved difficult.Some other issues that needed attention was the standardisation of a keyboard for entering Kannada characters and also to see how Kannada can be used in other software apart from the then existing desktop publishing applications. A group of researchers got together and started to discuss about these problems and brought them to the notice of the Government. In order to address these issues, a conference known as Kannada and computers was convened by the Government. The people invited to this conference included members of the Adivesha Co-operative Bank in Shimoga who had computerised all the bank's transactions in Kannada by using a software called as Gistcard which was developed by the Centre for Development of Advanced Computing. Members of the bank made a presentation to the delegates on the advantages of using Kannada for its day-to-day computer transactions. The conference was influential in making the Government understand the usefulness and the need of standardising Kannada for computing. Meanwhile, a group of interested people formed an organisation called Ganaka Parishath who followed these developments and started to bring pressure on the Government to address the issues of standardisation.

== Growth ==
A pioneer who standardised Kannada keyboard was K. P. Rao who modified the existing English QWERTY keyboard layout to suit the needs of the Kannada language. The entire set of Kannada characters could now be printed using the 26 alphabet keys on the English keyboard. After few modifications, this keyboard was announced as the standard Kannada keyboard by the Government. All Kannada software vendors were requested to adhere to this keyboard.

Initially, it was suggested to use the IISCI language code devised by CDAC to enable portability of Kannada across different software. This code however was unsuitable for transliteration and it was difficult to navigate across different languages using it. This was because the code could not address issues like change in grammar across languages. In March 2000, a technical committee was set up by the Government of Karnataka to look into this problem. Ganaka Parishath came up with a glyph code called "Kannada Script Code for Language Processing" (KSCLP) in 2001. This glyph code enabled easy movement of data across different software and its development is considered as a milestone in the history of Kannada software. The technical committee suggested that all software developers should adhere to this code.

In October 2000, the Government having solved the problems of standardisation, decided to have a benchmark software that will be the standard for usage of Kannada in computing. A software called Nudi was developed by Ganaka Parishath using a common code and also providing the ability to enter Kannada characters in different fonts. This was selected as the benchmark and all private software vendors were advised to adhered to the standards set by Nudi. There were some minor database-related issues which were solved by using a new improved code that was released by CDAC. Nudi was later converted into an advanced software by the Parishath and in 2002, the Government accepted it as an official software. Due to economic reasons, private software vendors put pressure on the Government to revoke the decision of standardisation. This was because if all Kannada software vendors produced the same standardised software, allowing their customers to have a choice to choose among the software vendors and hence an impact on existing business. As a final nail to the coffin, Ganaka Parishath decided to offer Nudi for free and this almost brought the Kannada software development industry to a halt.

Baraha was another software that was released by engineer Sheshadrivasu Chandrashekhar which became popular due to its free cost and the ease with which a user could edit Kannada characters. The emergence of Unicode and standardisation of Unicode characters for Kannada ensured that Kannada can now be used across any application that supports Unicode.

English to Kannada transliteration, as promoted by Google], is a yet another development in the advent of Kannada in computing.

== Kuvempu Kannada Thantramsha ==
Kuvempu Kannada Thantramsha was another Kannada software released by Kannada University, Hampi in the memory of Kuvempu. This is a source-on-demand software. This has 4 keyboard layouts and 4 text-to-text converters, in compliance with older version of Anu fonts, SRG, Sree lipi. This is built is accordance with GOK standards. Some of the other important software developed in Kannada are:

Latest version of Kuvempu Kannada Thantramsha 2.0 was released on 2-Feb-2010. Also Unicode version 1.0 is released. The source code is also made available.

- Bhoomi software used by Karnataka Government for Standardisation of Land records
- Ration Card application developed by Comat Technologies Pvt. Ltd.

== Kannada on mobile ==
A keyboard for using Kannada on Nokia n800/n810 has also been developed. This works on maemo(OS2008) running on Nokia n800/n810. This is an onscreen keyboard and is still in pre-alpha stage.

== Other free software ==
Kannada version of LOGO: A programming language for children and winner of the Manthan Award. LOGO Kannada Keyboard for Windows 7 and Windows 8. Kannada Keyboard.

== Portals ==
Vishvakannada.com by U. B. Pavanaja was one of the first websites to display Kannada characters on a website. It was the first Internet magazine in Kannada and also the first website in an Indian language to use dynamic fonts. The usage of dynamic fonts avoided the problem of users having to download website-specific fonts to view the Kannada characters on the website. Wikipedia in the Kannada language was started in June 2003.
