= Banakal =

- Village
- Location in Karnataka, India Banakal (India)
- Coordinates: 13.1386158°N 75.5504693°E
- Country: India
- State: Karnataka
- District: Chikmagalur

Languages
  - Official: Kannada
- Time zone: UTC+5:30 (IST)
- PIN: 577 113
- Telephone code: 08263

Banakal is a town in Mudigere Taluk, Chikmagalur district of Karnataka, India, in the Charmadi hills in the Western Ghats and on the banks of the Hemavati River. The geographical location of Banakal is 13°0'59" North and 75°53'9" East.
