= James Macnabb Campbell =

Scottish administrator in India and ethnologist

Sir James Macnabb Campbell, KCIE (1846–1903) was a Scottish administrator in India and ethnologist. During the 1890s he was a leading figure in the intellectual life of British Bombay.

== Life ==
Born at Partick, Lanarkshire, on 4 October 1846, he was a younger son among the six children of John McLeod Campbell and his wife Mary Campbell. Of his three brothers, the eldest, Donald (d. 1909), was rector of Oakford, Devon.

Campbell was educated at Glasgow Academy and Glasgow University, graduating M.A. in 1866. Passing the Indian Civil Service examination in 1867, he went out to Bombay in November 1869, and served as an assistant collector. Two of his brothers lived with him in Bombay, John McLeod Campbell (d. 1888) of the Bombay civil service, and Robert Story Campbell, a merchant.

From April to August 1877, Campbell was on famine work in the Kaladgi district. From April 1880 to near the close of 1881 he held successively the posts of municipal commissioner of Bombay, under-secretary to government in the political, judicial, and educational departments, and collector of Bombay. Campbell was made CIE in January 1885, and going home on his first furlough in that year was created hon. LL.D. of Glasgow University.

After serving as collector of various districts, Campbell was from November 1891 stationed at Bombay as collector of land revenue, customs, and opium. In 1895 and 1897 he acted also there as commissioner of customs, salt, opium, and abkari. At times he served also as chairman of the port trust.

Campbell was recalled from furlough early in 1897 to aid in measures against the third plague pandemic. In June 1897 he succeeded General Sir William Gatacre as chairman of a new plague committee at Bombay, and was made KCIE The committee's measures of sanitation provoked rioting and attacks against officers on plague duty (22 June 1897). There was famine in the country and thousands of refugees in Bombay. Campbell encouraged voluntary co-operation in inspection and other work. In June 1898 the plague administration was restored to the municipality.

== Last years ==
On 29 April 1898 Campbell left Bombay in bad health, resigning, on the expiry of his furlough, in April 1900. Residing with his brother Robert at his father's old home, Achnashie, Rosneath, Dumbartonshire, he found recreation in gardening. He died unmarried at Achnashie on 26 May 1903, and was buried in Roseneath churchyard, beside his parents.

== Legacy ==
A memorial tablet on the ruined wall of the old Rosneath church paid tribute to the example set by Campbell during the plague outbreak in Bombay, attributing to it his premature death. Friends also founded a gold medal, conferred triennially by the Bombay branch of the Royal Asiatic Society, for work on Indian folklore, history, or ethnology. The first medal was presented on 1 March 1909 to Aurel Stein, for his Ancient Khotan.

== Works ==
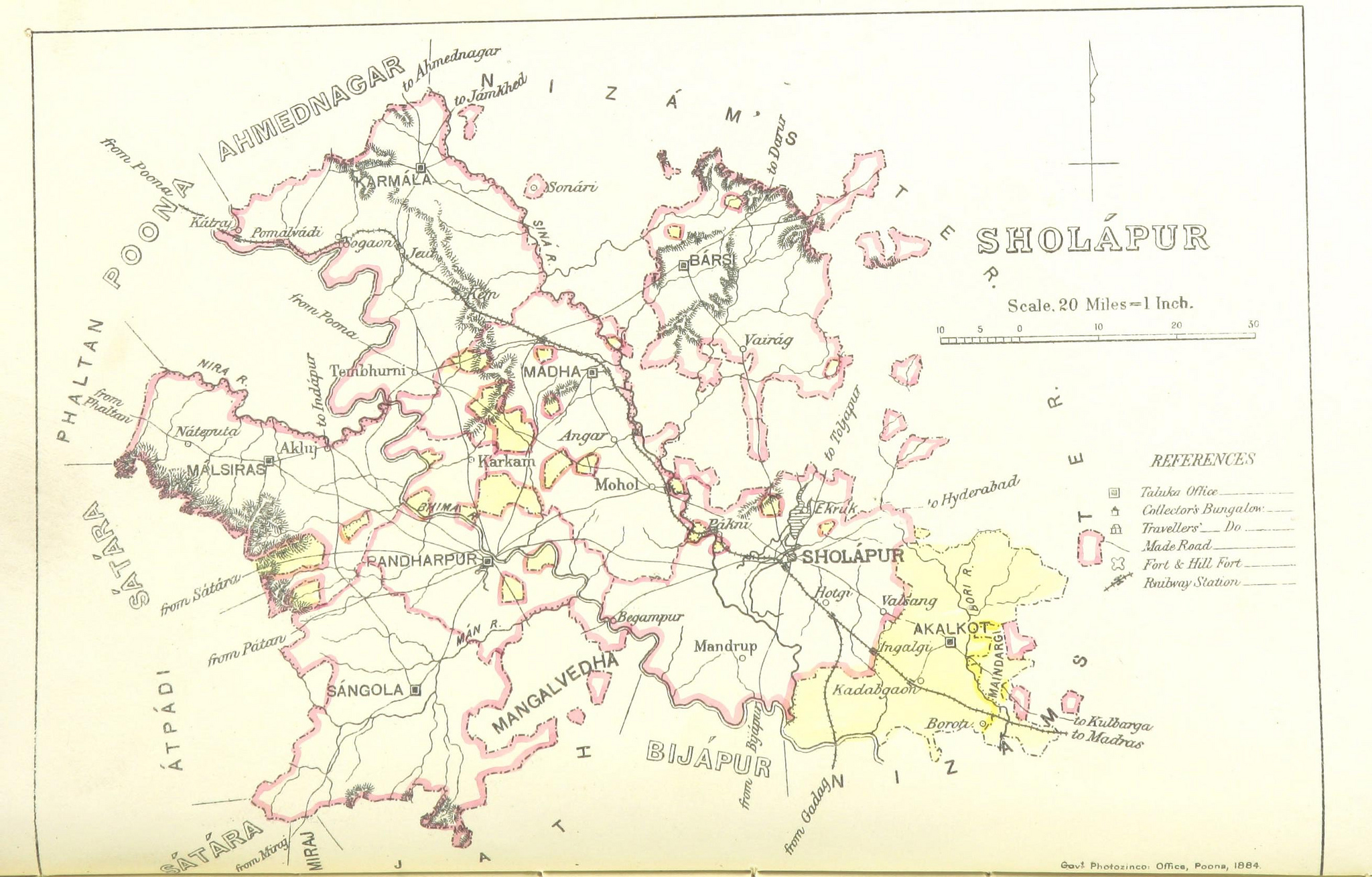
Solapur district map from the Gazetteer of the Bombay Presidency

In June 1873 Campbell was asked to take on the compilation of the Gazetteer of the Bombay Presidency. By August 1884 the statistical accounts alone occupied 27 volumes averaging 500 pages each. William Wilson Hunter as editor of The Imperial Gazetteer of India largely based the Bombay portions on Campbell's work. Campbell completed his Bombay Gazetteer at the end of 1901, in 34 volumes, and 26 sections; he himself wrote in those dealing with ethnology. In 1904 Reginald Edward Enthoven added an index volume, and updated some earlier statistics; in 1910 Stephen Meredyth Edwardes added three further volumes on the history of the town and island of Bombay.

Campbell collected material on Indian history and folklore. He published a history of Mandogarh in the Journal of the Bombay Branch, Royal Asiatic Society (vol. xix. 1895–7); papers in the proceedings of the Bombay Anthropological Society; and studies of demonology, under the title of Notes on the Spirit Basis of Belief and Custom, in the Indian Antiquary from 1894.

== Notes ==
Attribution

This article incorporates text from a publication now in the public domain: Lee, Sidney, ed. (1912). "Campbell, James Macnabb". Dictionary of National Biography (2nd supplement). Vol. 1. London: Smith, Elder & Co.
