= Komarpant =

Regions with significant populations

Languages
- Halegannada (Old Kannada), Marathi, Konkani

Religion
- Hinduism

The Komarpant (or Komarpant Naik or Komarpant Metri or komarpaik) are a social group centred in and around Karwar, which is a coastal town in Karnataka and also in various parts of Goa. Prominent surnames used by the community include Naik, Pujari, Phondekar, Belurkar, and Metri.

== Surnames and Regional History ==
Historically, the Kshatriya Komarpanth served in both martial and civic roles. Within this community, families bearing the Metri surname historically served as military headmen and regional administrators. Prominent surnames used by the broader community include Naik, Pujari, Phondekar, and Belurkar.

== Culture ==
Historically, the Komarpant community acknowledged the religious authority of the Sringeri Sharada Peetham and followed the decisions of its representatives in religious matters. Historical accounts also record different Brahmin groups serving the community in different regions, including Karnataka Brahmins, Havyaka Brahmins and Gaud Saraswat Brahmins, for religious and ceremonial purposes.

== Government Classification ==
The Komarpanth community is officially recognized under the Other Backward Classes (OBC) category. In Karnataka, the community is included in the Central List of OBCs and the state-level OBC list as Category 2(A). In Goa, the community is likewise recognized in the State Backward Classes list for social and educational revitalization.
