= Bengaluru Kannada =

Indian vernacular dialect

Bangalore Kannada is a vernacular dialect of the Indian language, Kannada, which serves as the official language of the state of Karnataka, as the native language by the majority people of Karnataka classical languages of India.

This dialect is primarily spoken by youth and in informal discourse between locals. This slang is quickly picked up by the outsiders who live in Bangalore.

Bangalore Kannada is spoken by the native people almost everywhere: at home, in educational institutions and other places. Bangalore and Mysore Kannada are the most commonly used in other mediums such as plays and movies.

Localities/areas in which Kannada is dominant include Basavanagudi, Basaveshwaranagar, Chamrajpet, Malleshwaram, Rajajinagar, Banashankari, Sadashivanagar, Vijayanagar, Jayanagar, J P Nagar, Shivaji Nagar, K.R market, Madhavnagar, Rajarajeshwari Nagar, Hebbala, Hosakerehalli, Kalasipalya, Konanakunte, Padmanabhanagar, Hanumanthnagar, V.V.Puram, Kumarswamy layout, Kathriguppe, Kengeri, Bidadi, Chandra layout, Kamakshipalya, Kamalanagar, Mahalaxmi layout, Nandini layout, Yeshwanthpur, Peenya Industrial Area, Jalahalli, Yelahanka, Dollars colony, RMV extension, Jnanabharti campus & surroundings, Hesaraghatta, Nagarbhavi, Vidyaranyapura etc. In other newer areas, one may hear other languages along with Kannada.

Through the years various radio stations have been popularising the language amongst youth and the large IT workforce of this city.

Some commonly used phrases, slangs or words specific to Bangalore Kannada are:transl. kan – transl. bombaat, Sakkath - Awesome/Cool

- transl. kan – transl. bejaan - A lot
- transl. kan – transl. kudumi - Bookworm
- transl. kan – transl. Chamak, dose - To scare someone in a funny way
- transl. kan – transl. Sisya - Your trusted buddy
- transl. kan – transl. Chindi - Amazing
- transl. kan – transl. Boni - First sale of the day (borrowed from Telugu)
- transl. kan – transl. KD - Cunning guy
- transl. kan – transl. Tight aagbittidaane - Literal "He's become tight" - highly drunken man (borrowed from Kerala)
- transl. kan – transl. Meter - A measure of someone's braveness
- transl. kan – transl. Thukaali - Foolish or Useless person
- transl. kan – transl. Kirik aagthide - Literal "A (brawl) is occurring" - A fight happening between 2 people or groups

These words can be slang or catchy words, and can also be combined into Kanglish [Kannada+English].

For instance, "just maja maadi", meaning, "chill out", is a phrase popularized by one of the city's radio stations "Enjoy maadi" and "swalpa adjust maadi" are other such popular Kanglish phrases. ("Maadi" literally means "do" or "make".)

== See also ==
- Languages of India
- Mangalore Kannada
- Kannada dialects
- Mixed languages
