= Kannada inscriptions =

Inscription

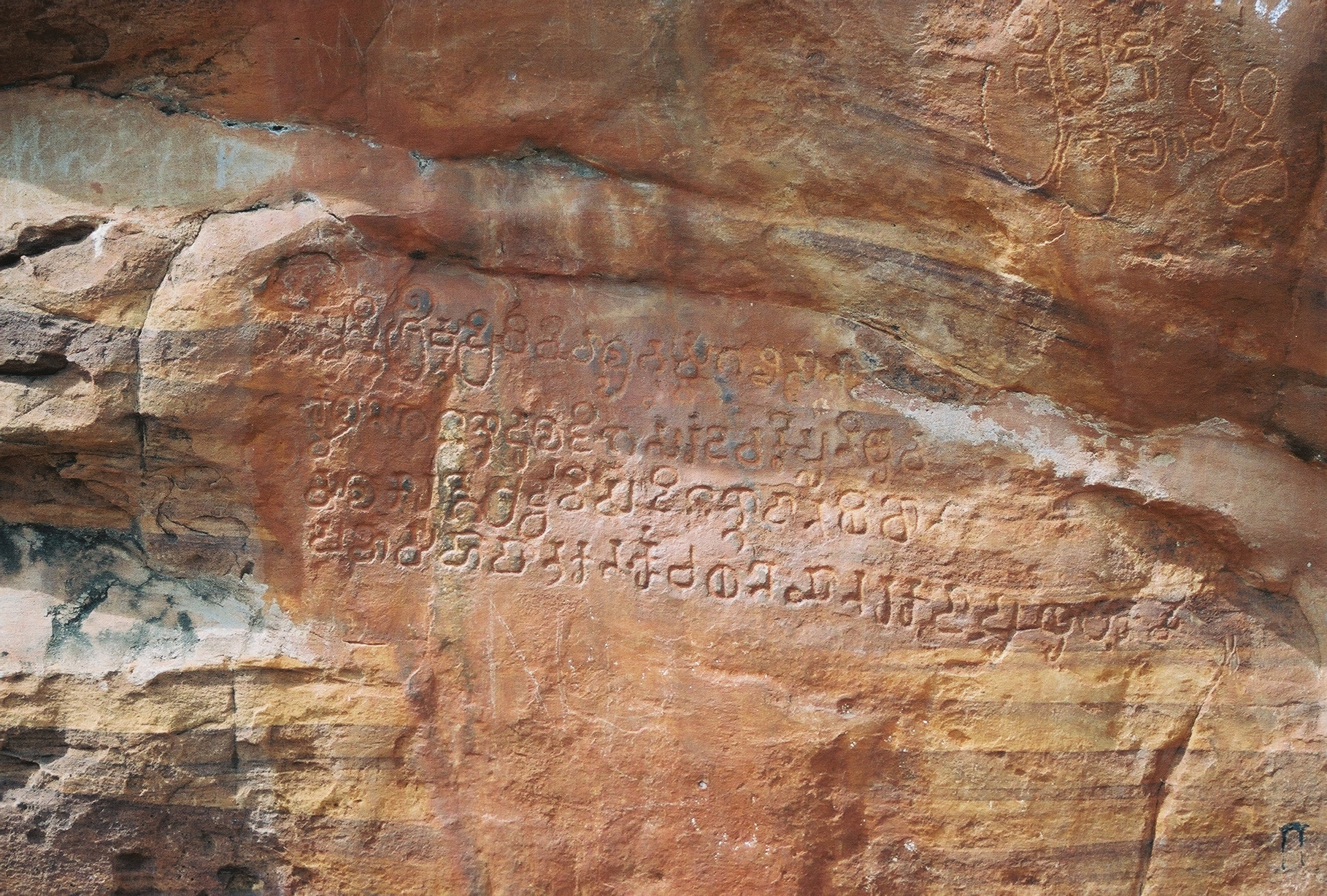
578 CE Mangalesha Kannada inscription in Cave temple # 3 at Badami

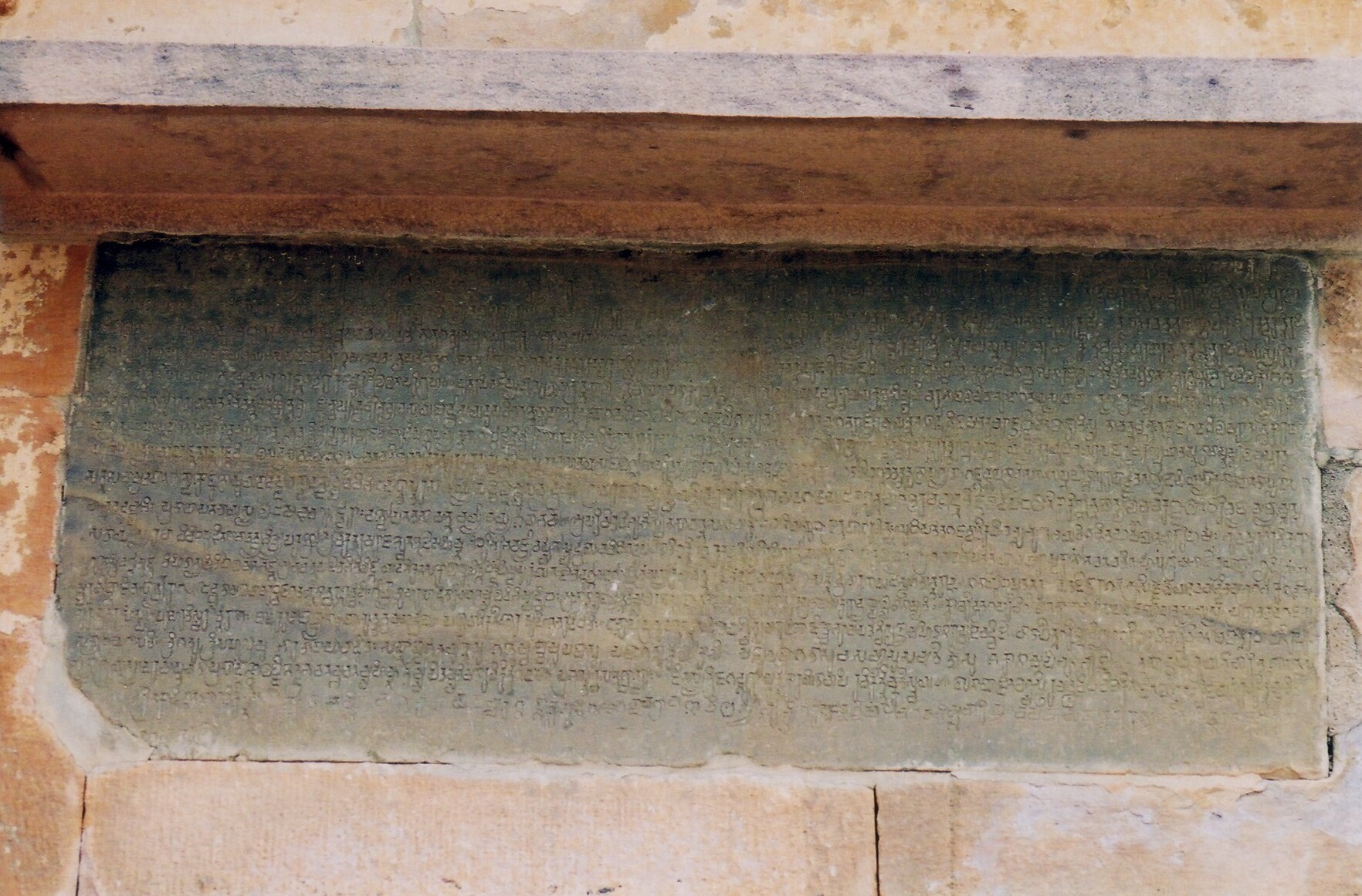
634CE Aihole inscription of Ravi Kirti

About 35,000 inscriptions found in Karnataka and nearby states belong to historic Kannada rulers, including the Kadambas, the Western Ganga Dynasty, the Rashtrakuta, the Chalukya, the Hoysala and the Vijayanagara Empire. Many inscriptions related to Jainism have been unearthed. The inscriptions found are generally on stone (Shilashasana) or copper plates (Tamarashasana). These Kannada inscriptions (Old Kannada, Kadamba script) are found on historical hero stones, coins, temple walls, pillars, tablets and rock edicts. They have contributed towards Kannada literature and helped to classify the eras of Proto Kannada, Pre Old Kannada, Old Kannada, Middle Kannada and New Kannada. Inscriptions depict the culture, tradition and prosperity of their era. The literature of Ramayana and Mahabharata are transferred through the generations by these inscriptions. The Hazara Rama Temple and Aranmula Parthasarathy Temple are the best examples of temples associated with Kannada inscriptions.

== Earliest Kannada inscriptions ==
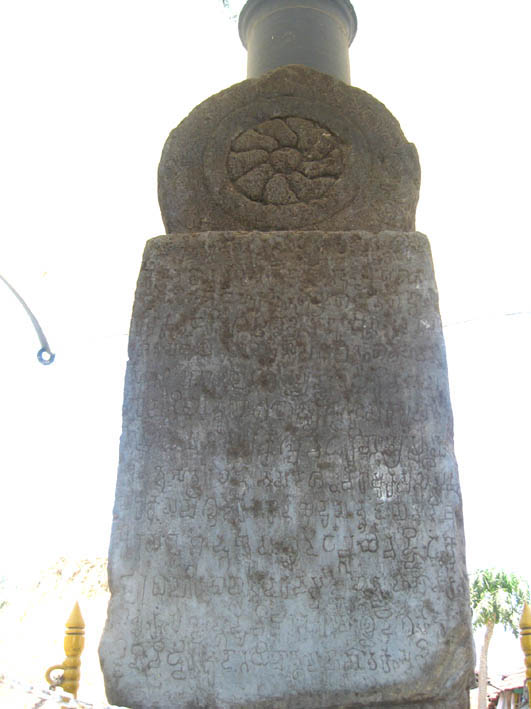
Halmidi inscription of 450 AD

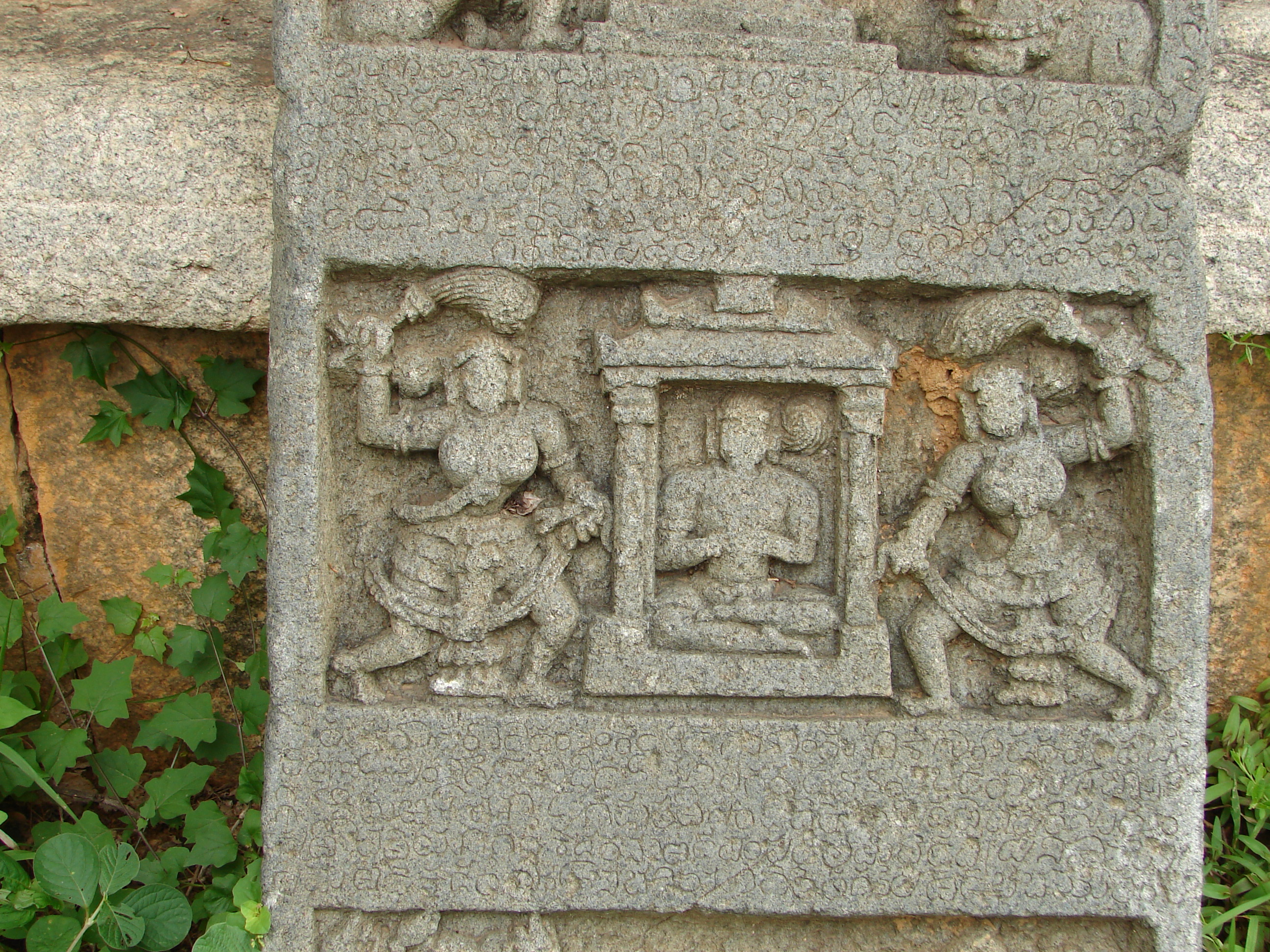
9th century AD Old Kannada inscription on Hero Stone in Kalleshvara Temple at Aralaguppe

The stone inscription (dated 370 CE) found at Talagunda near Shiralakoppa in the taluk during excavation by the Archaeological Survey of India (ASI) in 2013-14 is now said to be the earliest Kannada inscription. Nishadi Inscription of 400 AD of Chandragiri hill (Shravanabelagola), Halmidi inscription of 5th century AD and Aihole inscriptions are very important in the history of Kannada and Karnataka. 5th century Tamatekallu inscription of Chitradurga and 500 CE Chikkamagaluru inscription. The earliest known Kannada inscription in Bengaluru region traced to the reign of Sripurusha was discovered in 2018 in Hebbal. There are few Kannada words found in the edicts and inscriptions those are prior to the Christian era in places as far as Egypt.

Brahmagiri rock inscription of Ashoka

Ashoka rock edict at Brahmagiri in Chitradurga district is the ancient site of Ishila. An inscription there contains this most ancient Kannada word. The earliest recorded word of Kannada is Isila occurring in the Brahmagiri rock inscription of 252 BC (similar to many other inscriptions with Kannada words).

Tagarthi inscription

A Dr. S. Shettar completed a detailed palaeographic study over 10 years, finding five to six inscriptions that are older than Halmidi inscription (in Poorvada Halegannada dialect). The inscription is a mix of Brahmi, Kannada and Nagari scripts. One of those found at Tagarthi (within the Gangavadi region in Shimoga district) dates to 350 AD, during the Ganga dynasty. This study pushed the date push back by at least a century. The historian Suryanath Kamath also agree with the findings of Dr S. Shettar.

Gunabhushitana Nishadi inscription

M. G. Manjunath an epigraphist Mysore based scholar discovered 400 AD Gunabhushitana Nishadi inscription of Jainism one of the 271 inscriptions on Chandragiri hill of Shravanabelagola found near Parshwanatha Basadi, which is 50 years older than Halmidi inscription. It is mentioned in the Epigraphia Karnataka. There are Prakrit, Sanskrit and Purvada Halegannada (Old Kannada words. The four lined inscription has six words. The inscription is in Shatavahana Brahmi and Aadi Ganga script. M. Chidananda Murthy also agree that Gunabhushitana Nishadi Shasana was a Kannada inscription (in Purvada Halegannada script).

Halmidi inscription

The 5th century AD Halmidi inscription 16-line earliest Kannada inscription found at Halmidi in Belur taluk of Hassan district on rectangular sandstone ( 2.5 ft height and 1 ft width) has a Vishnu Chakra on its top. The language of the inscription is in Poorvada Halegannada ( Proto-Kannada). Archaeologist M. H. Krishna found the Brahmi script in the inscription. Shifted the inscription to Archaeological Museum, Mysore and later to Government Museum in Bangalore. Epigraphia Karnataka has dedicated a chapter to study of the inscription. The linguists and writers Govinda Pai, M. Chidananda Murthy, T. V. Venkatachala Sastry, Ram Sri Mugali, R.S. Panchamukhi, D.L. Narasimhachar, and M. M. Kalburgi studied the inscription and published papers. Writers including G. S. Gai, T. A. Gopinatha Rao, T. N. Srikantaiah, Shivarama Aithala, S. Nagaraju, S. Srikanta Sastri, M. Mariyappa Bhatta, M. B. Neginahal, K. V. Ramesh, Devarakondareddy and K. M. Hanumantha Rao have discussed the important issues raised by Halmidi inscription in their books.

Tamatakallu inscriptions

Chitradurga district is home for most ancient inscriptions written in archaic Kannada script. As per epigraphist Dr. B. Rajashekharappa the inscriptions known as Veeragallu at Tamatakal village written in Kannada script belongs mostly to end of Fifth Century or beginning of Sixth Century, describes the nature and achievements of Gunamadhura who ruled Masikapura (ancient name of Tamatakal), he was frivolous, generous and kind person. he was a favourite among women (Despite being of dark complexion), because of his kind nature. In 1903 by the historian late B. L. Rice discovered the inscriptions, Dr. Rajashekharappa found new aspects.

== Karnataka inscriptions of Kannada dynasties ==
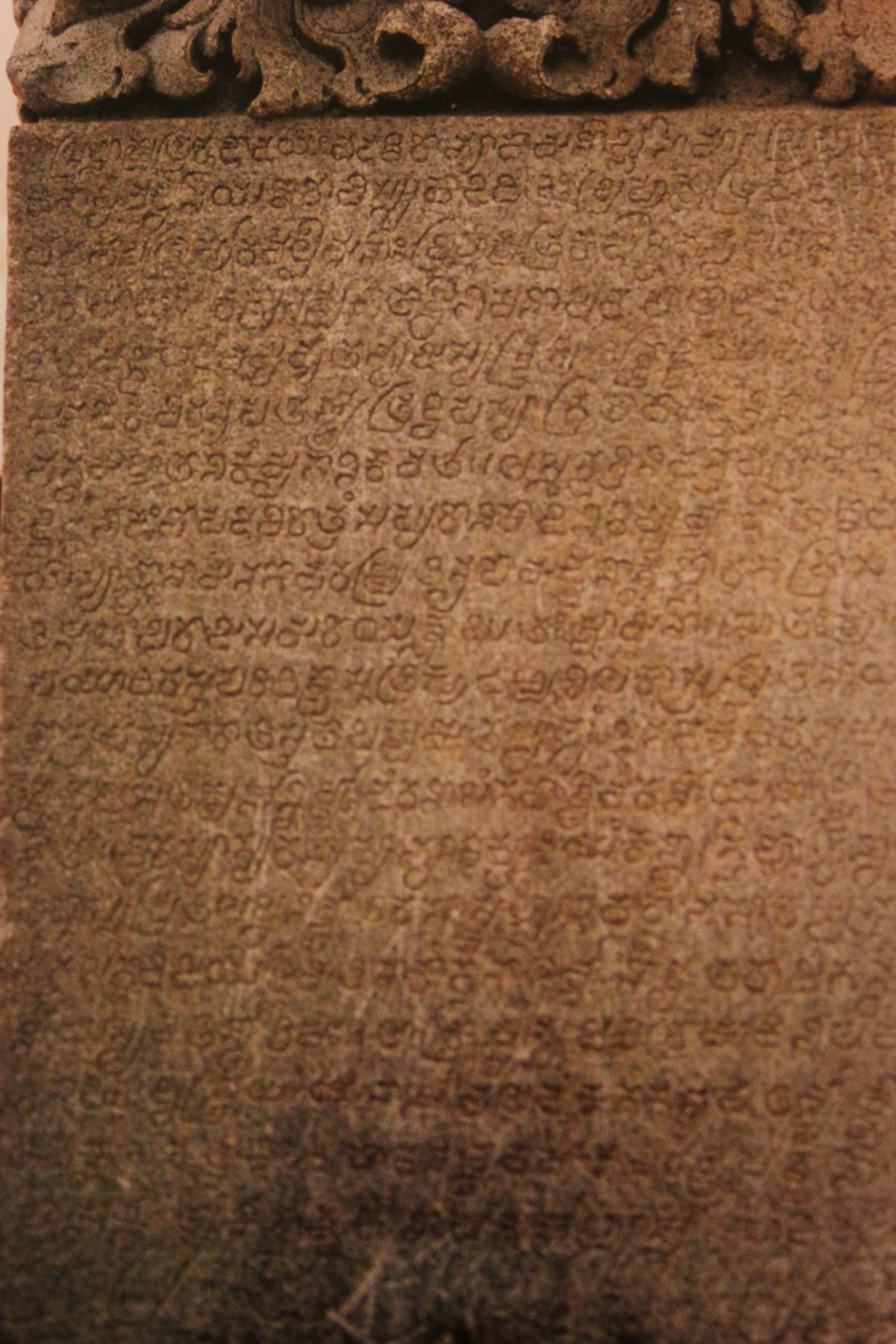
Old Kannada inscription of 983 CE on Tyagada Brahmadeva Pillar at Shravanabelagola

The Karnataka inscriptions are categorized as follows:

Kadambas inscriptions

- Halmidi inscription - Kadamba Coins and the earliest Kannada inscription
- Talagunda pillar inscription
- Halasi Inscriptions of Kadambas of Halasi
- Chandravalli rock inscription.
- In AD 475-490 Mrigesavarman of Kadambas of Halasi inscription there is mention about Yapaniya.

Western Ganga Dynasty inscriptions

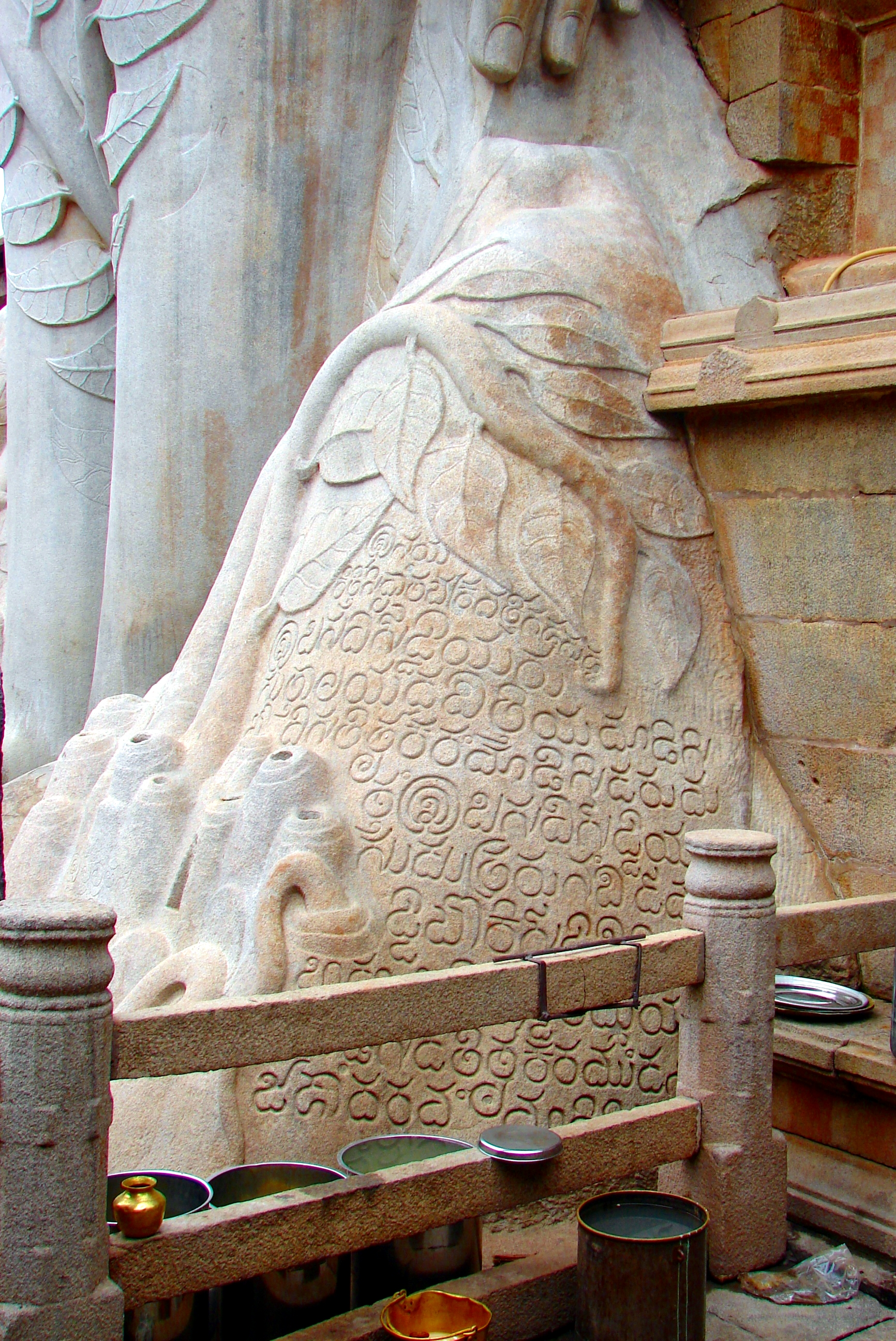
Old Kannada inscription at Vindyagiri Shravanabelagola

- The 981 CE Old Kannada inscription at Vindyagiri Shravanabelagola
- Hebbal-Kittayya inscription at Hebbal, Bangalore
- Doddahundi nishidhi inscription
- Atakur inscription
- The 983 CE Tyagada Brahmadeva Pillar at Shravanabelagola
- Shravanabelagola inscription of Nandisena
- Tumbula inscriptions of 444 AD, Sanskrit-Kannada inscription, the Kannada words are used to describe the land boundaries.
- Western Ganga Kannada writings

Chalukya inscriptions

- The 634CE Aihole inscription of Ravi Kirti (minister and poet of Badami Chalukya Pulakeshin II) available at the Meguti temple, the inscription is a eulogy of Pulakeshin II and his conquests.
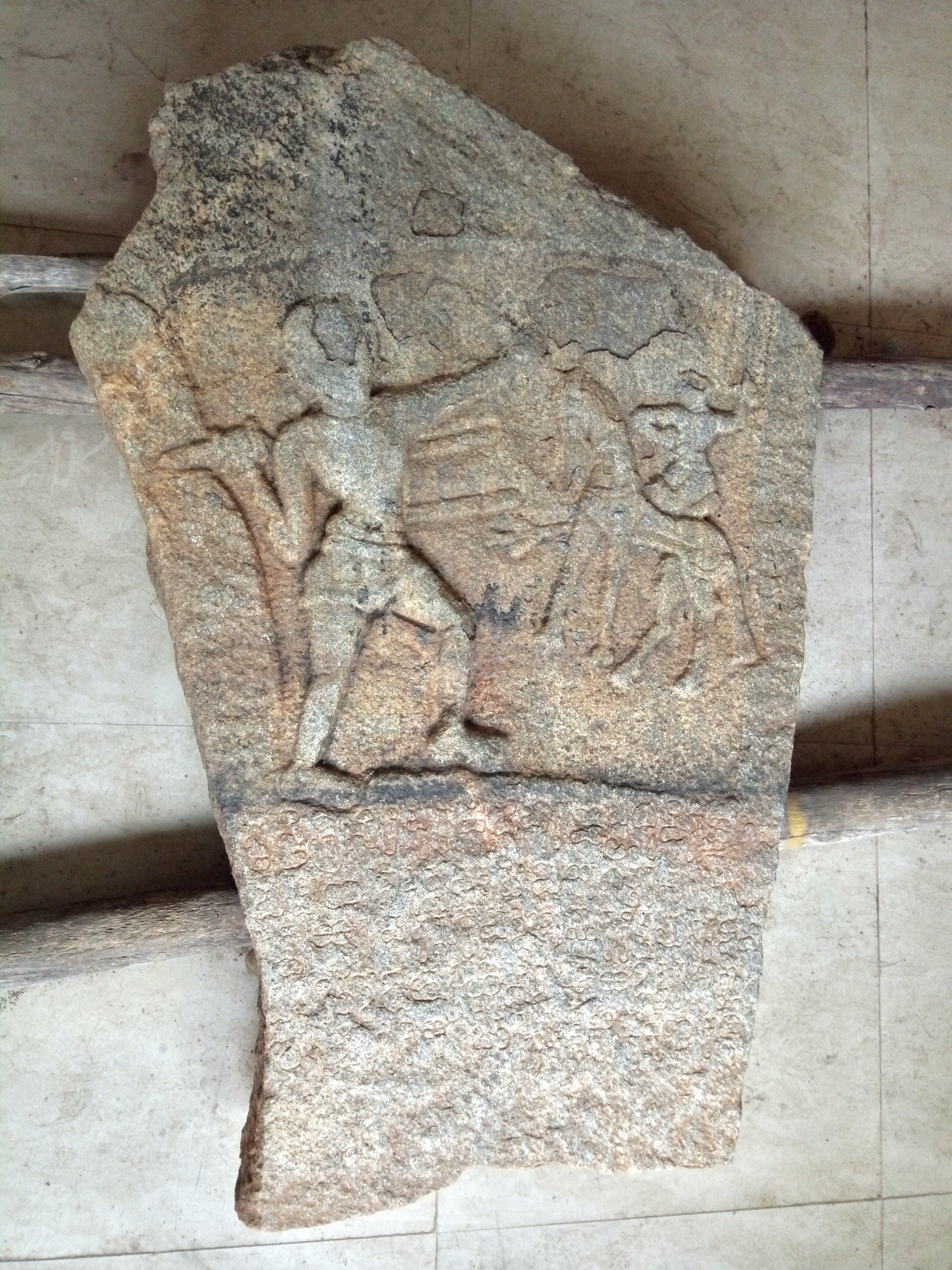
  750CE inscription stone found in 2018 at Hebbal referring to the region as Perbolu nadu
- Mahakuta Pillar
- Kappe Arabhatta
- Badami Inscriptions
- Gadag inscription of Vikramaditya VI
- Sudi Inscriptions
- 610AD Peddavaduguru inscription of Pulakeshin II

Rashtrakuta inscriptions

- Kavirajamarga
- Ninth century Kannada stone inscription of Rashtrakuta period unearthed near Tumbi Kere (tank) at Halekumur village in Byadgi Takuk. The inscription is about Rashtrakuta rulers donating 200 acres to Siddarevar Singh to construct a tank.
- Navalinga Temple inscriptions Kuknur.
- Northernmost Kannada inscription of the Rashtrakutas of 964 AD is the Jura record found near Jabalpur in Madhya Pradesh.
- Inscriptions related to Dantidurga

Hoysala inscriptions

Vijayanagara Empire inscriptions

- Nanjagud Taluk Inscription
- Jakkur Bengaluru inscriptions

Vengi Chalukya inscriptions

Yadava inscriptions

Kalachuri Inscriptions

== Kannada copper plates and manuscripts ==
- The 8th century AD oldest Kannada copper plate inscription found at Belmannu in Karkala taluk of Udupi district.
- Western Ganga Dynasty Tumbula inscriptions of 444 AD
- The 8th century AD Aluvarasa II of Alupas copper plate inscription in Kannada.
- The 1430 AD Vijayanagara empire Devarajapuram copper plate inscription having state-deity Virupaksha's signature at the bottom in Kannada script to certify a grant of land to Brahmins (by King Devaraya II (1425-1446)).

== Coins bearing Kannada inscription ==
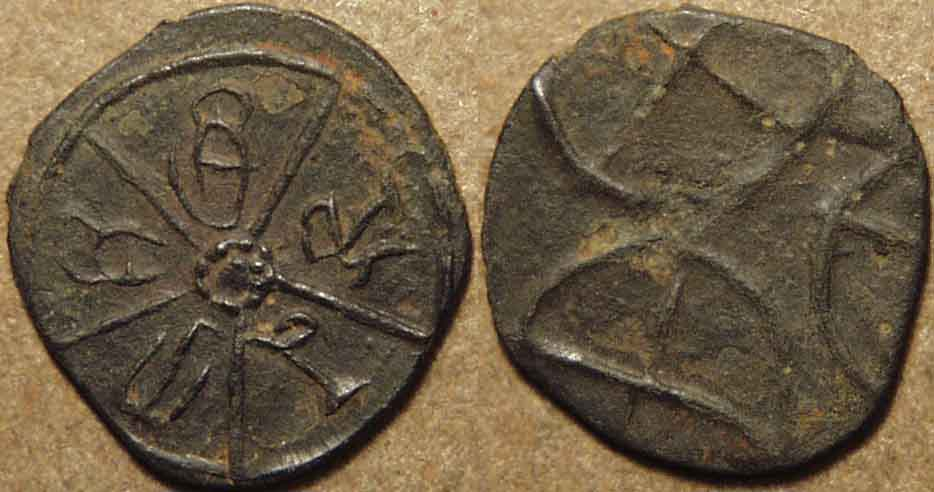
Kadamba Coin of Shanthivarma, 5th century Kannada legend Sri Manarashi

- The 5th Century copper coin in archaic Kannada script found at Banavasi. One side has five letter inscription Sri Manaragi and symbol of Ujjain on other side.
- Coins bearing Kannada inscription
- Pagodas and Fanams with Kannada inscription were the coinage of Alupas.
- Kadamba Coins
- Lari (fish hook money)
- Sudi and Lakkundi coins mint (Tankhashaley)
- Honnu or Gadyana of Hoysala
- Kalachuri Kannada Coinage

== Kannada inscriptions found outside Karnataka ==
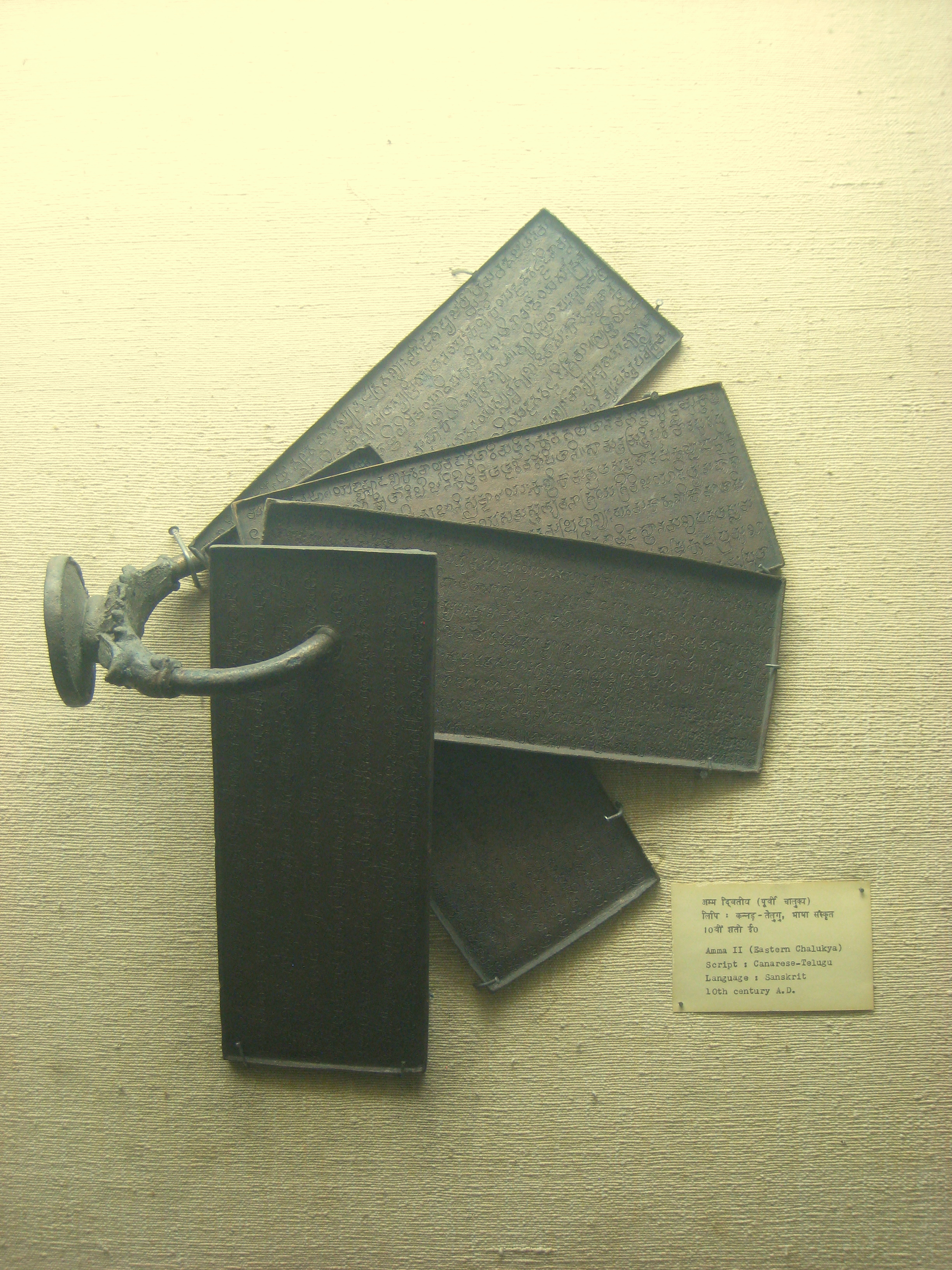
10th century AD Copper plates inscription in Kannada-Telugu script

Many Kannada inscriptions are found outside Karnataka, mainly in Maharashtra, Tamil Nadu and Andhra Pradesh.

=== Kannada inscriptions found in Andhra Pradesh ===
Andhra Pradesh has numerous Kannada inscriptions.

- Kannada inscription of Gooty in Andhra Pradesh.
- At Tirumala Venkateswara Temple at Tirupati there are about 50 inscriptions available in Telugu and Kannada.
- Inscription (in Kannada-Telugu script) of Vijayanagara empire found at Kadimetla in Yemmiganur mandal of Kurnool district.
- The 10th century AD copper plates of Amma II of Eastern Chalukya in Kannada-Telugu script available at National Museum New Delhi.
- A 15th Century inscription written in Kannada found in a mango orchard in Krishnampalle of T. Kammapalle panchayat (in Pullampet mandal) in Kadapa district. The inscription with the portrait of Tallapaka Pedda Tirumalarayudu (eldest son of saint lyricist Tallapaka Annamacharya) and Sankham, Chakram and Namam of Lord Vishnu.

=== Kannada inscriptions found in Maharashtra ===
- The Karhad copper plates in Kannada from Maharashtra is about after the defeat of Rajaditya in Takkolam the Krishna III's distribution of the raid of war; among his people at Melpadi military camp (Tamil Nadu) and also there is mention that Krishna III's invasion of the Chola territory was also to provide livelihood for his people.
- Majority of the inscriptions found at Bombay (Mumbai) are in Prakrit, Sanskrit and few are in Kannada. Out of the inscriptions found two belongs to Chalukyas, one to Kadambas, two to Rashtrakutas, eight to Shilaharas, one to Yadavas of Devagiri.
- Shilaharas Kannada inscriptions, Silharas of Kolhapur used Kannada in inscriptions.
- Maharashtra is mentioned as Maharashtraka (Great districts or provinces) in 580 CE Chalukya inscription.
- Many historical inscriptions mentioned Kolhapur as Kollgiri, Kolladigirpattan, Kshullakpur Kollapur and Kollpur, particularly the word Kollpur originated from Kannada language.
- Kannada inscriptions of Solapur district in Maharashtra
- Inscriptions at Ellora
- The 11th - 12th Century AD period Kannada Inscription of Chalukya Vikramaditya VI found at Beed Maharashtra

=== Kannada inscriptions found in Tamil Nadu ===
The Kannada inscription of Rashtrakuta king Krishna III period (of Tenth century CE) found at Melpadi village in Vellore district of Tamil Nadu. It is mentioned as the endowment was made in the presence of Krishna III's feudatories (Rattas and Bitti Raja of Melpadi). Krishna III was praised as Akalavarsha Deva, Prithvi Vallabha, Maha Rajathiraja, Parameshvara, Parama Bhattaraka and Chaleka Nallathan and it indicats that he was about to accomplish his conquests of Kancheepuram and Thanjavur. The Kannada inscriptions found at Kanchipuram, Dharmapuri region, Vazhaithottam in Nilgiri District, Jain Palli at Alathur in Avinasi taluk, Coimbatore District and Karamadai copper plate inscription. Avinashi Temple inscription in Coimbatore, Kanchi inscription of Vikramaditya, Sittannavasal inscription, Melpadi inscription of Rastrakuta Krishna III, Madras Kannada Herostone inscription, Kodumbalur inscription of Irukkuvelir Chiefs and Hero-stone inscriptions in Kondaharahalli are the inscriptions in Kannada.

Other parts of the world

- The stone scripture found in Doleshwor of Nepal written in Kannada.
- Pyu sites of Myanmar yielded variety of Indian scripts including Kannada inscription.
- The Deopara inscription describes the Senas as Karnata Kshatriyas and Brahma-Kshatriyas.

== Research institute of Kannada manuscripts ==
- Oriental Research Institute Mysore
- Oriental Research Institute & Manuscripts Library

== Authors of Kannada inscriptions and manuscripts ==
- Shivakotiacharya
- Nagavarma I
- Phakirappa Gurubasappa Halakatti
- Aluru Venkata Rao

== Kannada scholars ==
- Colin Mackenzie (1754 - 1921)
- John Faithfull Fleet (1847 - 1917)
- Arthur Coke Burnell (1840 – 1882)
- B. Lewis Rice (1837 – 1927)
- S. Srikanta Sastri (1904 - 1974)
- B. A. Saletore (1900 - 1963)
- P. B. Desai (1910 - 1974)
- A. N. Narasimhia (? - ?)
- G. S. Gai (1917 - 1995)
- M. Chidananda Murthy (1931 - 2020)
- Suryanath U. Kamath (1937 - 2015)
- M. M. Kalburgi (1938 - 2015)

== See also ==
- Sritattvanidhi
- Kannada language#Epigraphy
- Shabdamanidarpana
- Extinct Kannada literature
- List of State Protected Monuments in Karnataka
- Kannada-Telugu script
- Linguistic history of the Indian subcontinent#History of Kannada
- List of museums in Karnataka
- Kalya Inscriptions
