= Extinct Kannada literature =

Extinct Kannada literature is a body of literature of the Kannada language dating from the period preceding the first extant work, Kavirajamarga (ca. 850 CE).

Although no works of this period are available now, references to them are found in the Kavirajamarga and a handful of other extant works. While a few scholars may have expressed reservations regarding the extent of this literature, noted modern scholars such as A.K. Ramanujan, K.A. Nilakanta Sastri, R. S. Mugali, and A. K. Warder, to name a few, have hypothesized that a body of literature must have existed in an earlier period.

== Some early writings and forms ==
The earliest available examples of a Kannada inscriptions are the Halmidi inscription, allegedly a Kadamba royal edict commonly dated to fifth or sixth century CE, the Tamatekallu inscription which has been identified by some scholars to be from the 5th century, the Siragunda inscription of 500 CE, and the dated Badami cave inscription of King Mangalesha (578 CE). The Kappe Arabhatta record of the 7th century and the Shravanabelagola inscription of Nandisena, also from the 7th century, form the earliest surviving record of Kannada poetry.

The earliest surviving literature in rich manuscript form, the Kavirajamarga ("Royal Path for Poets") is dated to 850 CE; references are made in it to earlier prose writers such as Durvinita, Vimalachandra, Udaya, Nagarjuna, Jayabhandu and to poets including Kavisvara, Srivijaya, Pandita Chandra, Ravi Kirti (634) and Lokapala. Vaddaradhane by Shivakotiacharya, Literary works of three Ratna's of Kananda namely, Adikavi Pampa, Ponna (poet) and Ranna (Kannada poet) are noteworthy.

== Extinct writings and forms ==
Kavirajamarga discusses earlier composition forms peculiar to Kannada, the gadyakatha, a mixture of prose and poetry, the chattana and the bedande, poems of several stanzas that were meant to be sung with the optional use of a musical instrument. Regarding earlier poetry in Kannada, the author of Kavirajamarga states "Hala Gannada (lit old Kannada) is appropriate in ancient poems but insipid in works of the present time, like an association with an old woman" .

Other writers, whose works are not in existence now but titles of which are mentioned in independent references are Syamakundacharya (c. 650), who authored the Prabhrita, and Srivaradhadeva (also called Tumubuluracharya, c. 650 or earlier), who wrote the Chudamani ("Crest Jewel"), a 96,000-verse commentary on logic. The Karnatheshwara Katha, a eulogy of the Chalukya King Pulakesi II, is ascribed to the 7th or 8th century. The Gajashtaka, a lost ashtaka (eight line verse) composition, was authored by King Shivamara II in c. 800. The composition served as the basis for two popular folk songs, ovanige and onakevadu, which were sung either while pounding corn or to entice wild elephants into a pit (ovam).

Srivijaya, a court poet of Amoghavarsha I, wrote the Chandraprabha Purana in the early 9th century. His writing has been mentioned by Vijayanagara poets Mangarasa III and Doddiah (also spelt Doddayya, c. 1550) and praised by Durgasimha (c. 1025). During the same period, the Digambara Jain poet Asaga (or Asoka) authored, among other writings, Karnata Kumarasambhava Kavya and Varadamana Charitra. His works have been praised by later poets, although none of his works are available today. Gunagankiyam, the earliest known prosody in Kannada, was referenced in a Tamil work dated to the 10th century or earlier (Yapparungalakkarigai by Amritasagara). Gunanandi, who was known as an expert in logic, Kannada grammar and prose lived in the 9th century. Around c. 900, Gunavarma I wrote Shudraka and Harivamsha (also known as Neminatha Purana). In Shudraka he compared his patron, Ganga king Ereganga Neetimarga II, to a noted king called Shudraka. Jinachandra, who is referred to by Sri Ponna (c. 950) as the author of Pujyapada Charita, had earned the honorific "modern Samantha Bhadra".
