= A. N. Narasimhia =

A. N. Narasimhia (Agaram Narasimha Narasimhia) was an epigraphist and scholar of the Kannada language, especially its historical aspects.

== Career ==
Narasimhia received his PhD, under the supervision of Professor R. L. Turner, from the School of Oriental and African Studies, University of London in 1933. Upon his return to India, he became the librarian and part-time professor of philology at the Maharaja College of Mysore. In 1941, the University of Mysore published his PhD thesis, A Grammar of the Oldest Kanarese inscriptions, as the first volume in its series "Studies in Dravidian Philology." The book was reviewed by Thomas Burrow, in the Bulletin of the School of Oriental and African Studies, University of London, Vol. 11, No. 1 (1943), pp. 230–231, and along with G. S. Gai's later published A Historical Grammar of Old Kannada, is regarded as a pioneering study in the field.

== See also ==
- Kappe Arabhatta
- Tripadi
- Halmidi inscription
