= Origin of the Western Ganga Dynasty =

The Western Ganga Dynasty ruled large parts of southern Karnataka from the fourth century CE till the late tenth century CE with their regal capital initially at Kolar (then called as Kuvalala) and later at Talakad in Mysore district, Karnataka. The origin of the Ganga clan prior to the fourth century is shrouded in legends and myths. Clarity into their history comes from such contemporaneous writings as Chavundaraya Purana in Kannada and Lokhavibhaga in Prakrit and from numerous inscriptions excavated in the Mysore, Bangalore and Kolar districts (southern region of modern Karnataka) and Anantapur district (of modern Andhra Pradesh). The Western Gangas played a pivotal role in the development of polity, culture and literature during their long rule in the region, at times as independent monarchs and at other times as subordinates of their larger neighbors: the Badami Chalukyas and later the Rashtrakutas of Manyakheta. Their patronage to literature in Kannada and Sanskrit, their achievements in architecture including the famous monolith of Gomateshwara, their Hindu temples in the southern Karnataka, and their Jain Basadi's of Shravanabelagola and Kambadahalli are testimony to the rich contribution they made to the region..

== Origin ==
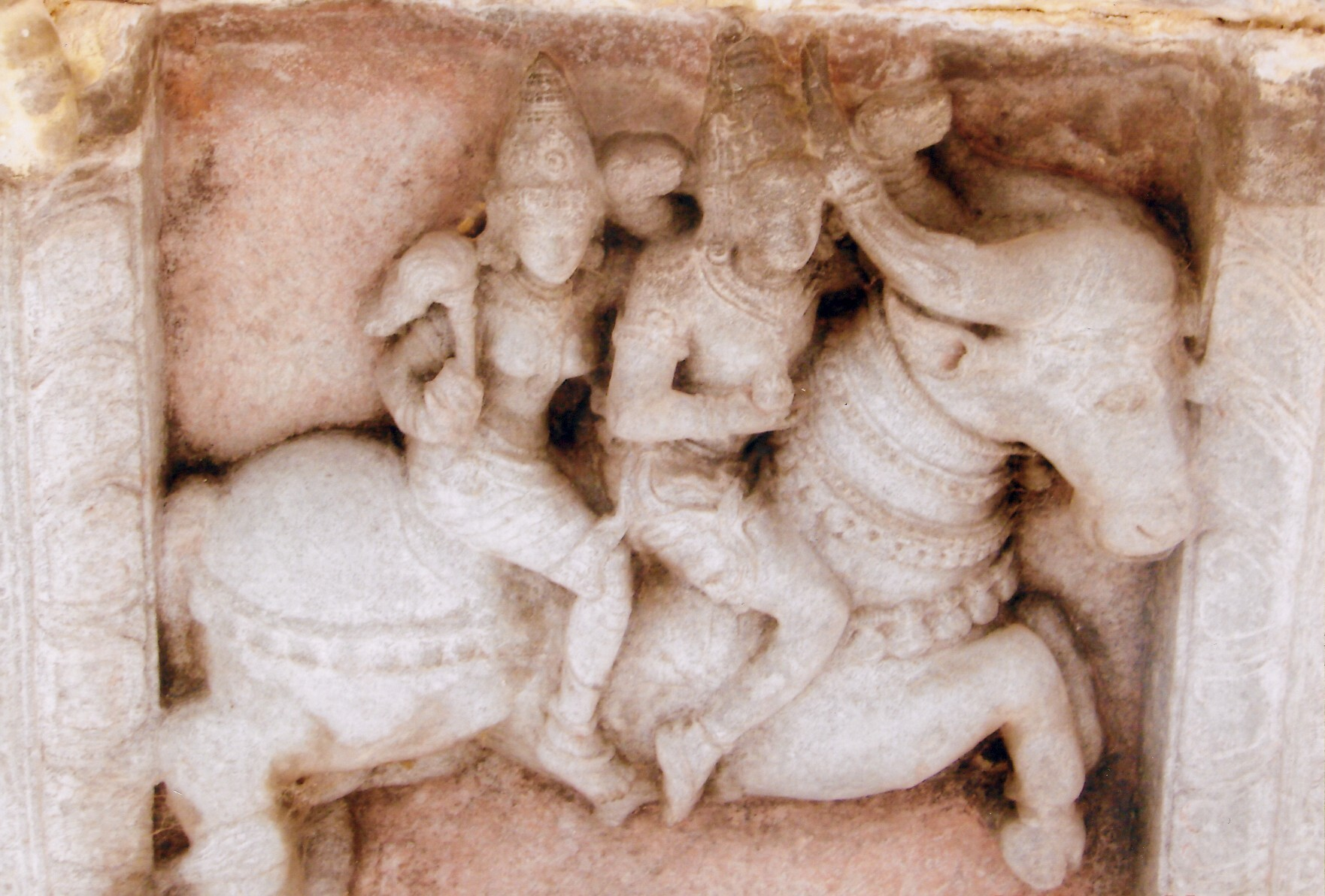
Roof sculpture, Panchakuta Basadi, Kambadahalli

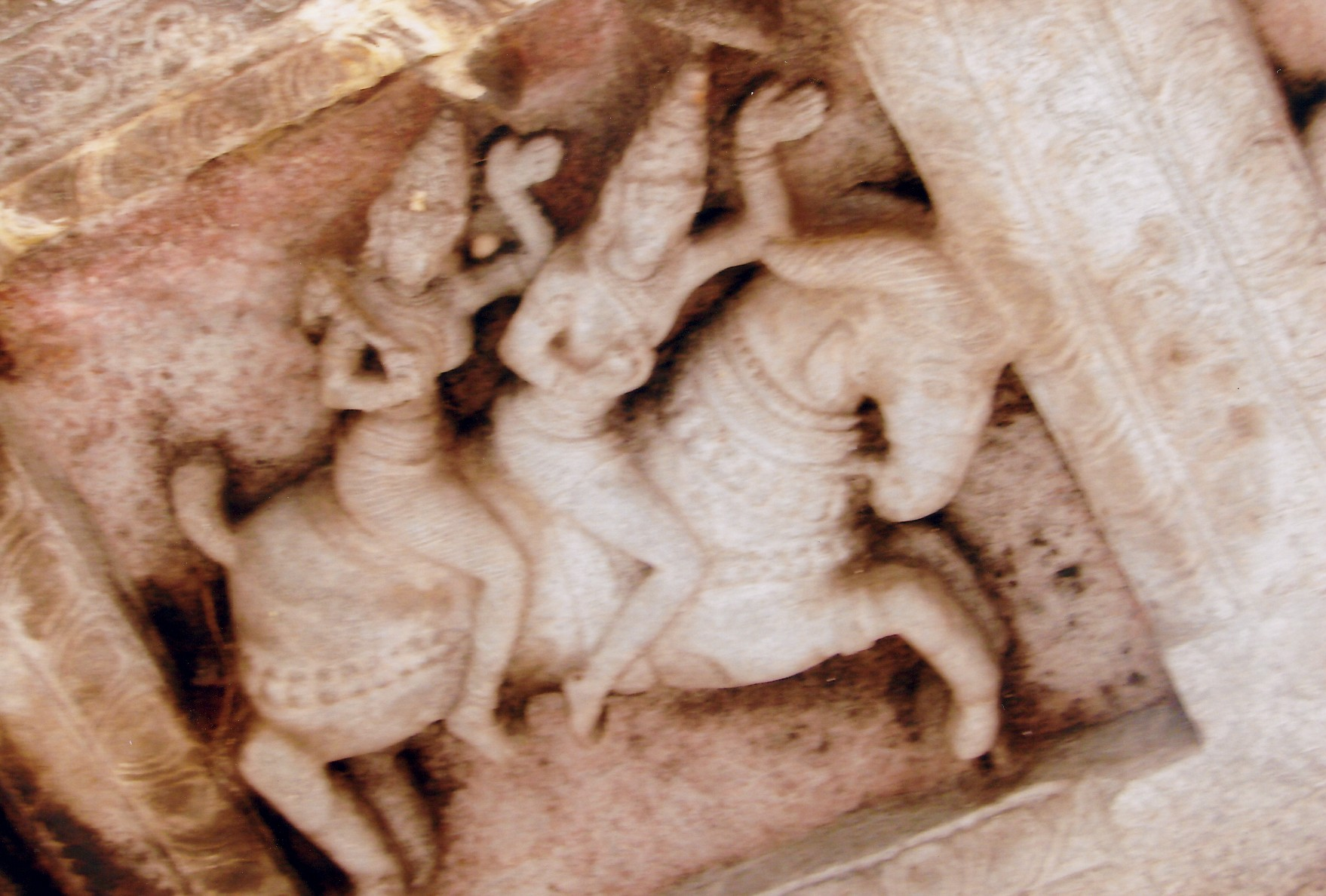
Roof sculpture, Panchakuta Basadi, Kambadahalli

Multiple theories have been proposed by historians regarding the ancestry of the founders of the Western Ganga dynasty (prior to the fourth century). One such theory claims that they were immigrants from northern India and another that they were natives of the southern Deccan region. While the northern origin theory is generally considered legendary in nature, historians such as L.K Iyer, Stein, Adiga, Rice, Sarma and Kamath have further debated whether the early petty chieftains of the clan (prior to their rise to power) originated from the southern districts of modern Karnataka, Kongu Nadu region of modern Tamil Nadu or southern districts of modern Andhra Pradesh.

Some of their early inscriptions claim that they belonged to the Kanvayana lineage (gotra) and Jahnveya family (kula). This has prompted historians Rice and Jayaswal to link them to the Kanva dynasty of Magadha (in modern Bihar state) implying a northern origin. But according to Adiga, this theory has failed to explain the difference of four centuries between the end of the Kanva rule in the north in the first century BCE and the rise of the Ganga dynasty in the south in the fourth century CE.

Some twelfth century inscriptions issued by their descendants trace their lineage to the kings of Ikshvaku dynasty of Ayodhya. They also give legendary accounts of their migration to the south, propitiation of the goddess Ganga (from whom the name of the dynasty is claimed to be derived) and the spiritual association of the two early immigrant princes, Dadiga and Madhava to a Jain preceptor Simhanandi at Perur (now identified as Cudappah, Andhra Pradesh). These princes are said to have later propitiated the goddess Padmavathi who rewarded them with a kingdom and throne to rule over. According to another legendary account, the goddess Padmavathi gave a sword to the Jain Guru, using which Madhava struck a stone pillar and broke the pillar into two. Hence the Guru is said to have crowned Madhava as the king.

Historian Krishna Rao has postulated that they were descendants of the Andhra Ikshvakus who were the successors of the Satavahanas in the third century. With the weakening of the Ikshvaku rule following the campaigns of King Samudragupta into southern India, they may have founded a new kingdom in Perur and later moved to Kolar in modern Karnataka in the fourth century. However, Adiga rejects this theory and points out that the early Ganga inscriptions themselves are silent on the subject of their descent from the Ikshvakus and any migration from northern India. Mention of the Jain Guru only starts from eighth century records and hence Adiga argues that the theory may have been popularised by Jains to gain royal patronage from the powerful Western Gangas, who from the beginning had been staunch champions of Vedic Brahminism. Robert Sewell and Vishwanath claim the earliest home of the Gangas was the Kongu region in Tamil Nadu, accepting in toto a twelfth century Shimoga inscription. They further qualify their reasoning with a seventeenth century chronicle called Kongidesarajakkal. They have identified Perur (the place where the princes supposedly met the Jain guru) as a location in the Coimbatore district of Tamil Nadu. This is because some Tamil inscriptions call them Konganiyarasas (kings of Kongu region). However Adiga has pointed out that this epithet may have come into use only because the Kongu region came under their control quite early in their rule.

Adiga and Sarma have pointed out that several Ganga inscriptions from the ninth and tenth centuries call the Gangas, Kuvalalapuravaresvara (lit, "Lord of Kolar") and Nandagirinatha (lit, "Lord of Nandi Hills"), both regions in south eastern Karnataka, when their capital had moved further west into the Kaveri River valley region of Talakad. Field surveys and inscriptional studies in the Bangalore-Kolar, Mandya-Mysore and Tumkur-Hassan regions by epigraphists R. Narasimhachar and K.V. Ramesh show they originated from these regions in modern south Karnataka. It has been noted that the Gangadikara Vokkaligas form the largest agricultural group in the old Mysore state (south Karnataka) even today. Burton Stein, I. M. Muthanna and L. K. Ananthakrishna Iyer feel the rulers were Gangadikara chiefs. No substantial artefactual data from neighboring southern Andhra Pradesh (Cuddapah, Anathpur, Chittor region ) has been obtained to prove their origin in that location. Also, the earliest epigraph records calling the Ganga kings Konganipattam (Kongani crown) starts only with the Serugunda inscription of 6th century, during the rule of King Avinita, indicating the conquest of the Kongu region by Avinita. This is proof enough, it is claimed by Sarma, that the Gangas were not natives of the Kongu region of modern Tamil Nadu either. All foreign origin theories are based on inscriptions that were inscribed several centuries after their coming to power and since they don't concur with the early Ganga copper plates, historians Adiga, Sheik Ali, R.S. Panchamukhi and Lakshminarayana Rao claim that the ancestors and the founders of the Western Ganga dynasty were natives of the south Karnataka region. Like their contemporaries, the Kadambas of Banavasi, they too may have taken advantage of the confusion caused by the campaigns of Samudragupta in South India and created an independent kingdom. Adiga claims most of the Western Ganga inscriptions from the early phase of their rule are from their first capital Kolar (and neighbouring regions) indicating this region was their original power base and home. It was only during the rule of King Harivarman that their rule expanded to include the Paruvi region (Hindupur taluk in Anantapur district, Andhra Pradesh) and the Kulungijya Rajya (possibly Kunigal Taluk, Tumkur district, Karnataka). From inscriptions it is known that the progenitor of the kingdom was King Konganivarman who expanded his kingdom by the force of arms.

There are also theories that during their early rule, multiple Ganga branches may have operated from Talakad (Mysore district), Kaivara (Kolar district) and Paruvi (Ananthpur district). The multiple branch theory has been rejected by other historians. It however seems clear that from the time of Harivarman and his successor Madhavavarman II, the Gangas had established themselves firmly from Talakad, with the other two possible branches becoming indistinguishable. It has been suggested that during their early rule from South Karnataka region, they were subordinates of the Pallavas of Kanchi, though contrary evidences are present in the early inscriptions of King Madhavavarman I.
