= G. S. Gai =

G. S. Gai (Govind Swamirao Gai) (3 March 1917 – 5 February 1995) was an Indian epigraphist, historical linguist, and historian, known for his expertise in early-medieval Kannada language inscriptions. From 1962 until 1976, Gai was the Chief Epigraphist for the Archaeological Survey of India.

Gai was awarded a Research Scholarship in 1939 at the Deccan College Post-Graduate Research Institute to investigate Kannada language inscriptions. The inscriptions had been the subject of earlier work by A. N. Narasimhia, whose University of London thesis (and later book), A Grammar of the Oldest Kanarese Inscriptions, concentrated on inscriptions from the sixth and seventh centuries. Gai's own graduate work picked up where Narasimhia's left off, and focused on the inscriptions from the eighth to the tenth centuries. Gai subsequently received his Ph.D. from the University of Bombay, and his thesis, A Historical Grammar of Old Kannada: based entirely on the Kannada inscriptions of the 8th, 9th and 10th centuries A. D. was published in book form by the Deccan College Post-graduate and Research Institute, Poona, in 1946. He is the first PhD awardee of Deccan College Postgraduate Research Institute, Pune. The book received a positive review by Thomas Burrow in Bulletin of the School of Oriental and African Studies, University of London, Vol. 12, No. 2 (1948), pp. 466–467, and is considered to be a pioneering study in the field.

In 1943, Gai joined the epigraphy branch of the Archaeological Survey of India, ultimately attaining, in 1962, the highest position in the department, the Government Epigraphist for India. In 1963, the position was changed to Chief Epigraphist, one which Dr. Gai retained until his retirement in 1976.

== Works ==
Gai is the author of many books; in addition to this Ph.D. thesis, he is the author of Introduction to Indian epigraphy : with special reference to the development of the scripts and language (1986), Some select inscriptions (1990), Studies in Indian history, epigraphy, and culture (1992), Inscriptions of the early Kadambas (1996) and Indian epigraphy: its bearing on the history of art (edited with F. M. Asher, 1985). Gai also authored over one hundred research papers on epigraphy, history, linguistics and archaeology. He edited South Indian Inscriptions Vol. XX and Epigraphia Indica vols XXXV to XXXVIII, published by the Archaeological Survey of India. He was also the joint editor of the revised Corpus Inscripionum Indicarum, Vol. III.

== See also ==
- D. C. Sircar
- Halmidi inscription
- Indian inscriptions
