= Tripadi =

Tripadi (Kannada, lit. tri: three, pad or "adi": feet) is a native metre in the Kannada language dating back to c. 700 CE.

== Definition ==
The tripadi consists of three lines, each differing from the others in the number of feet and moras (Sanskrit matras), but in accordance with the following rules:

- The first line has 4 feet, each with 5 moras, and a caesura at the end of the second foot.
- The 6th and 10th feet of the tripadi are each required to have the metrical pattern of a Brahma foot:

$-\smile \ \mathrm{or} \ \smile\smile\smile \ \mathrm{or} \ -- \ \mathrm{or} \ \smile\smile- \ \$

where $\smile$ (breve) denotes a short syllable, and $-$ (macron) a long one.

- The remaining feet have either 5 moras or 4, chosen to satisfy the rules of Nagavarma II:

Line 1 20 moras in four feet
Line 2 17 moras in four feet
Line 3 13 moras in three feet.

- There is alliteration of the second letter of each line.

== Metrical structure ==
An example, of a possible scansion (metrical structure) of a tripadi, is given in (Kittel 1875, p. 98), where it is also stressed that it is not the form of the moras, but the number that is important. (Here * denotes a caesura)

$\overbrace{\smile \smile \smile-}^{\mathrm{Foot 1}} | \overbrace{\smile\smile\smile-}^{\mathrm{Foot 2}} \star \overbrace{\smile\smile\smile-}^{\mathrm{Foot 3}} | \overbrace{-\smile-}^{\mathrm{Foot 4}}$ (Line 1: 20 moras in 4 feet)

$\overbrace{\smile \smile \smile\smile}^{\mathrm{Foot 5}} | \overbrace{\underbrace{--}_{\mathrm{Brahma}}}^{\mathrm{Foot VI}} | \overbrace{\smile\smile\smile-}^{\mathrm{Foot 7}} | \overbrace{\smile\smile\smile\smile}^{\mathrm{Foot 8}}$ (Line 2: 17 moras in 4 feet)

$\overbrace{\smile \smile \smile\smile}^{\mathrm{Foot 9}} | \overbrace{\underbrace{--}_{\mathrm{Brahma}}}^{\mathrm{Foot X}} | \overbrace{\smile\smile\smile-}^{\mathrm{Foot 11}} ||$ (Line 3: 13 moras in 3 feet)

Another example (Kittel 1875, p. 99) is:

$\overbrace{\smile \smile-\smile}^{\mathrm{Foot 1}} | \overbrace{--\smile}^{\mathrm{Foot 2}} \star \overbrace{\smile\smile-\smile}^{\mathrm{Foot 3}} | \overbrace{-\smile-}^{\mathrm{Foot 4}}$ (Line 1: 20 moras in 4 feet)

$\overbrace{\smile \smile \smile\smile}^{\mathrm{Foot 5}} | \overbrace{\underbrace{-\smile}_{\mathrm{Brahma}}}^{\mathrm{Foot VI}} | \overbrace{\smile\smile-\smile}^{\mathrm{Foot 7}} | \overbrace{-\smile\smile\smile}^{\mathrm{Foot 8}}$ (Line 2: 17 moras in 4 feet)

$\overbrace{\smile \smile -\smile}^{\mathrm{Foot 9}} | \overbrace{\underbrace{-\smile}_{\mathrm{Brahma}}}^{\mathrm{Foot X}} | \overbrace{\smile\smile\smile-}^{\mathrm{Foot 11}} ||$ (Line 3: 13 moras in 3 feet)

== Example ==
A well-known example of the tripadi is the third stanza in the inscription of Kappe Arabhatta (here the symbol | denotes the end of a line, and ||, the end of the tripadi):

Sādhuge^{1a} Sādhu^{1b} mādhuryange^{1c} mādhuryam^{1d} |
bādhippa^{1e} kalige^{2a} kaliyuga^{2b} viparītan^{2b} |
mādhavan^{2c} ītan^{2d} peran^{2e} alla^{2f} ||

The literal translation of the tripadi is:

To the good people,^{1a} good;^{1b} to the sweet,^{1c} sweetness;^{1d} |
causing distress^{1e} to the kali age,^{2a} an exceptional man in Kaliyuga,^{2b} |
Madhava (or Vishnu)^{2c} this man,^{2d} another^{2e} is not^{2f}||

== See also ==
- Kannada language
- Kannada literature
- Kannada meter (poetry)
