= Western Ganga literature =

Body of writings created in Gangavadi

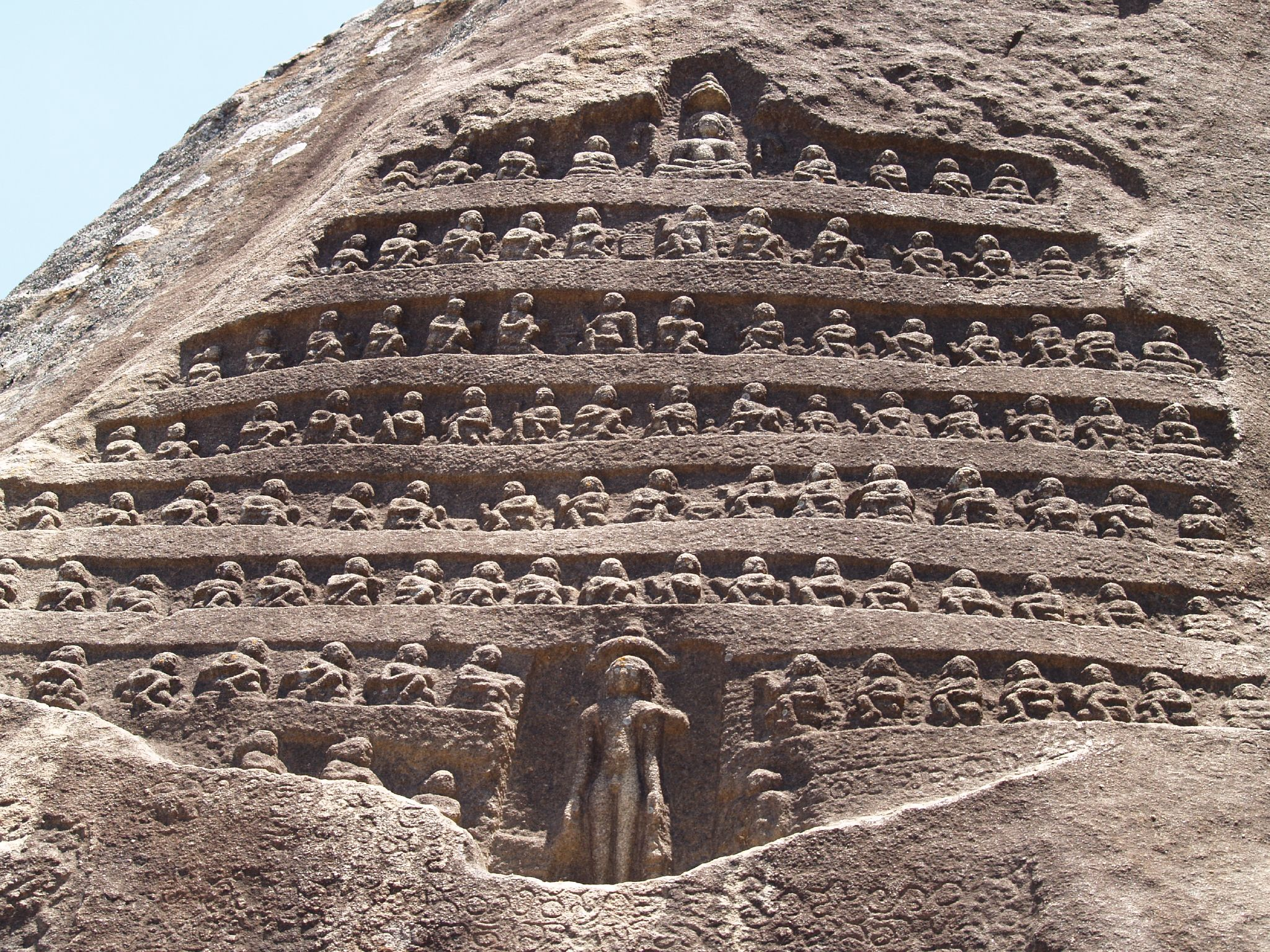
Rock carvings of Jainas at Shravanabelagola

Western Ganga literature (Kannada: ಪಶ್ಚಿಮ ಗಂಗ ಸಾಹಿತ್ಯ) refers to a body of writings created during the rule of the Western Ganga Dynasty, a dynasty that ruled the region historically known as Gangavadi (modern Southern Karnataka, India) between the 4th and 11th centuries. The period of their rule was an important time in the history of South Indian literature in general and Kannada literature in particular, though many of the writings are deemed extinct. Some of the most famous poets of Kannada language graced the courts of the Ganga kings. Court poets and royalty created eminent works in Kannada language and Sanskrit language that spanned such literary forms as prose, poetry, Hindu epics, Jain Tirthankaras (saints) and elephant management.

== Kannada writings ==
Kannada poets and writers in Western Ganga Kingdom (350–1000 CE)
Durvinita	529-579
Chavundaraya	978
Gunavarma I	900
Ranna	973
Nagavarma I	990
Gunanandi	9th century
Shivamara II	800

The prose piece of Chavundaraya, who was a famous Ganga minister and army commander, known as Chavundaraya Purana (or Trishashtilakshana mahapurana) written in 978 CE, is an early existing work in the genre in Kannada and is a summary of the Sanskrit writings, Adipurana and Uttarapurana, written by Jinasena and Gunabhadra during the rule of Rashtrakuta Amoghavarsha I. The prose, composed in lucid Kannada, was meant mainly for the common man and avoided any reference to complicated elements of Jain doctrines and philosophy. In his writing, the influences of his predecessor Adikavi Pampa and contemporary Ranna are seen. The work narrates the legends of twenty-four Jain Tirthankaras, twelve Chakravarti's, nine Balabhadra's, nine Narayana's and nine Pratinarayana's – narrations on 63 Jain proponents in all.

This writing states that along with the Tirthankaras, their mothers were also worshipped, particularly by women. The worship of Vaishravana, the keeper of celestial treasure was for acquiring moral and religious merit (punya), the worship of Dharnendra was for acquiring sons and of Shridevi for warding off influences of evil deities (vairi devategal). The author eulogises his preceptor Ajitasena Munindra thus :"He removes the stain of karma and awakens the spirit of those close to him (aptavarga), he astonishes rival disputants and secures the goddess of liberation (mokshalakshmi) to those desiring it. O Bhavya, worship the lotus feet of Ajitasena Munindra with a pure mind".

The earliest known Kannada writer from this dynasty is King Durvinita of the 6th century. Kavirajamarga of 850 CE, refers to him as an early writer in Kannada prose. It is claimed that the name Durvinita is found only in Kavirajamarga and Western Ganga inscriptions prior to the Magadi inscription of 966. This according to historians is proof enough that the Durvinita mentioned in Kavirajamarga is the Western Ganga king.

Gunavarma I, the Kannada epic writer authored Shudraka and Harivamsha (also known as Neminatha Purana), the earliest known purana in Kannada, around 900 CE. His works are considered extinct but are found referenced in later years. He is known to have been patronised by King Ereganga Neetimarga II in late 9th century - early 10th century. In his writing Shudraka, the author has favourably compared his patron to King Shudraka of ancient times. The great Kannada poet Ranna (who was also a soldier by training), who along with Sri Ponna and Adikavi Pampa are considered the "three gems of Kannada literature" was patronised by Chavundaraya, the Ganga minister in his early literary days. Ranna's classic Parashurama charite which is considered extinct may have been a eulogy of his patron who held such titles as Samara Parashurama. Ranna later went on to become the poet laureate of Western Chalukya Kings Tailapa II and Satyashraya.

Nagavarma I, a Brahmin scholar who came from Vengi in modern Andhra Pradesh (late 10th century) was also patronised by Chavundaraya. He wrote Chandombudhi (ocean of prosody) addressed to his wife. This is considered the earliest available Kannada writing in prosody. His other existing writing, Karnataka Kadambari written in sweet and flowing champu style (a composition written in a mixed prose-verse style) has found popularity with critics and is based on an earlier romance in Sanskrit by poet Bana. Gajashtaka (a hundred verses) a work on elephant management, known to have been written by King Shivamara II around 800 CE, is now considered extinct. Other writers from the close of the 10th century whose names are known are Manasiga and Chandrabhatta.

== Sanskrit writings ==
This was the age of classical Sanskrit literature. From the earliest times, Western Ganga kings showed a strong inclination towards the fine arts. King Madhava II (brother of King Vishnugopa) wrote a treatise Dattaka Sutravritti on an earlier work on erotics by a writer called Dattaka. To King Durvinita is ascribed the Sanskrit version of Vaddakatha, a commentary on Pāṇini's grammar called Sabdavathara and a commentary on the 15th chapter of a Sanskrit work called Kiratarjunneya by poet Bharavi (who was in King Durvinita's court). King Sripurusha wrote a treatise on elephants called Gajashastra and King Shivamara II is known to have written Gajamata Kalpana.

Hemasena, also known as Vidya Dhananjaya authored Raghavapandaviya, a narration of the stories of Rama and the Pandavas simultaneously through puns. His pupil Vadeebhasimha wrote in prose Gayachintamani and Kshatrachudamini based on poet Banas Kadambari and minister Chavundaraya wrote Charitarasara.
