= Hoysala administration =

South Indian Kannada dynasty

The Hoysala Kingdom (Kannada: ಹೊಯ್ಸಳ ಸಾಮ್ರಾಜ್ಯ) was a notable South Indian Kannada dynasty that ruled most of what is now the state of Karnataka between the 10th to the 14th centuries. The capital of the kingdom was initially based at Belur, and later transferred to Halebidu.

Hoysala administration was influenced by the Western Ganga Dynasty whom the Hoysalas replaced in present-day South Karnataka and their early overlords, the Western Chalukyas.

== Administration ==
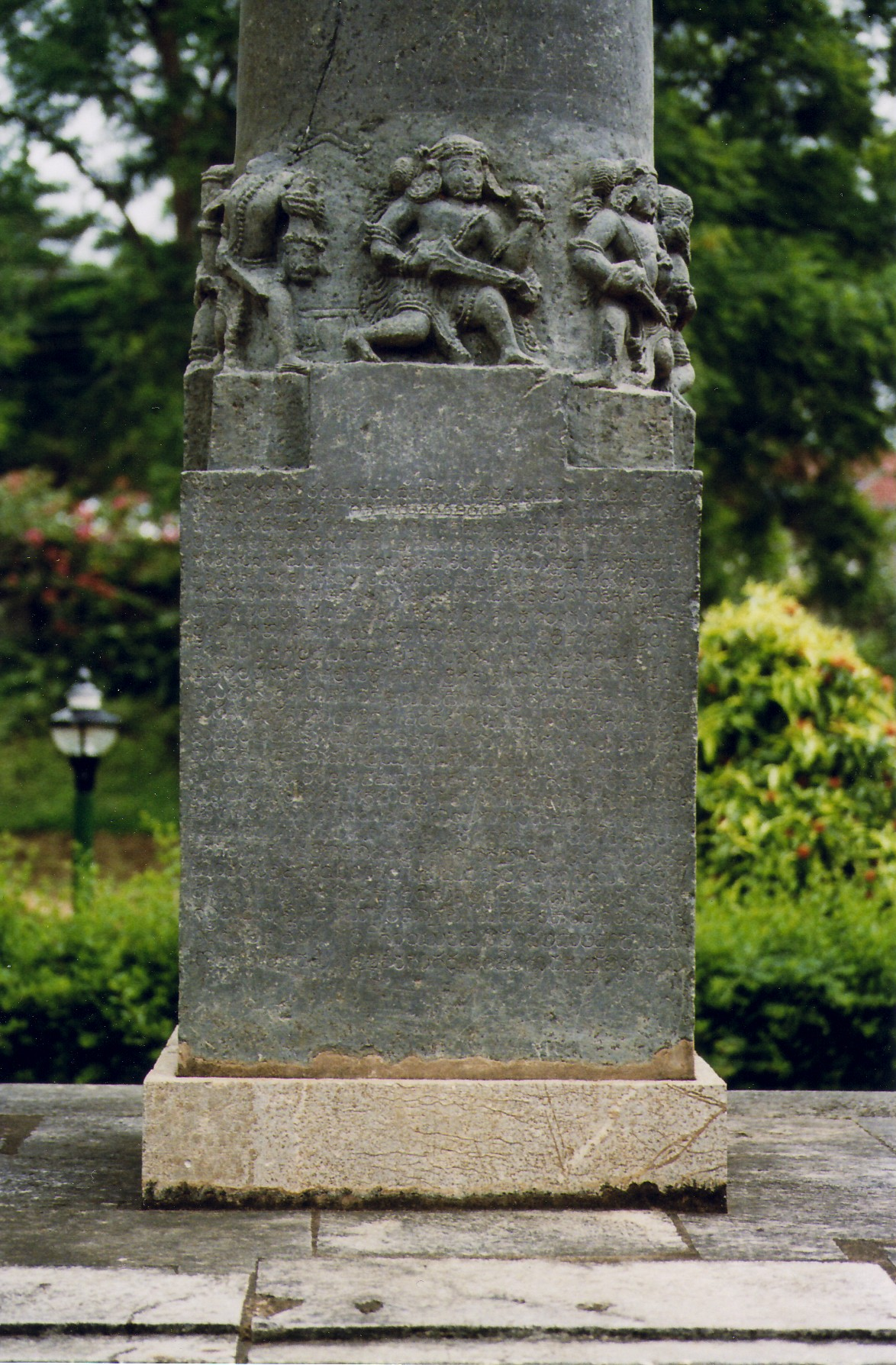
Garuda pillar, Halebidu

The Hoysala administrative machinery had many similarities with that of the Western Chalukya and Western Ganga Dynasties in matters of cabinet and command, local governing bodies and division of territory into provinces and districts. Several of the major feudatories of the Hoysalas were Gavundas of the peasant extraction. Some historians state that in the highly centralised Hoysala kingdom the king sought the advice of five major ministers (Pancha Pradhanas) while others claim a higher number. As the kingdom grew in the 13th century, the number of ministers also grew with each having limited authority. Inscriptions mention many names with responsibilities tied to such areas as foreign affairs (Sandhivigrahi), treasurer (Mahabhandari or Hiranyabhandari), personal secretary (Paramavishvasi), chief master of robes (Mahapasayita), justice (Dharmadhikari), central register (Kaditha), and head of the State Secretariat (Srikaranadhikari). Some ministers also oversaw clusters of departments (Sarvadhikari). Army commanders were called Dandanayaka (or Senadhipati).

The kingdom was divided into provinces (Nadu and Vishayas). Further division of land was into Kampanas and Deshas. Under the caretaker commander were minister (Mahapradhana), treasurer (Bhandari), clerk (Senabove) and junior officers (Heggades). Feudatory families such as Alupas, Santharas, Chengalvas, Kongalvas, Sindas were allowed to continue to govern their respective territories. The Hoysalas minted gold coins with Kannada and Devanagari legends. King Vishnuvardhana's coins had the legends "victor at Nolambavadi" (Nolambavadigonda), "victor at Talakad" (Talakadugonda), "victor of the hills" (Malaparolgonda). Their gold coin was called Honnu or Gadyana and weighed 62 grains of gold. Pana or Hana was 1/10 of the Honnu. Haga was ¼th of the Pana. Visa was ¼th of Haga. There were coins called Bele and Kani as well. Some of these terms Hana, Bele are still used in Kannada language and mean "money" and "cost" respectively.

The Garudas were the elite bodyguards of kings and queens. They were known as lenkas (heroes) or jolavalis (indebted to the king for food) and velavalis (those who stood by the king at all times). They served the king the way the mythical eagle Garuda served Lord Vishnu and committed suicide upon the demise of their master. Hero stones (virgal) erected in memory of such heroes are called Garuda pillars. The Garuda pillar at the Hoysaleswara temple in Halebidu depicts heroes brandishing knives and others cutting their own heads. Kuvara Lakshma, a minister and bodyguard of king Veera Ballala II took his own life and that of his wife and other bodyguards upon the death of his master. The details of his loyalty are etched on this inscription (Shasana).
