= Nanjagud Taluk Inscription =

The Nanjagud Taluk inscription is a record registering the grant of a village called Kavahalli or Kalihalli (same as the present village Kahalli) for services in the Kirtinarayana temple at Talakad on the Kaveri river in T.-Narsipur Taluk, Mysore District. It is located in the village Kahahalli in Hobali of Bilgere, on a stone lying near the village entrance.

== Description ==
The inscription is dated to the reign of the Vijayanagar king Krishnaraya and is dated S' 1434 Srimukha sam. Phal. ba. 5. This date corresponds to March 15, A. D. 1514, if we take S' 1434 expired or S' 1435 current Srimukha as the year intended.

The king Krishnaraya is here styled Krishnavarma-mahadhiraja (L.8) as is aged the case in two other inscriptions of the same Taluk (E. C. III. Nanjangud 190 and 195 of 1512 and 1513 A. D.). He is given some titles of the Western Gangas and Hoysalas. (Jitam bhagavata gata-Ghana-gaganabhena Another point to notice in this record is the mention of the king's visit to the southern part of his empire on a conquering expedition.

Saluva Timmarasa and his brother Saluva Govindaraja were ministers of Krishnaraja and Govindaraja was entrusted with the government of Terakanambi kingdom (see E. C. IV Gundlupet 3 of S 1435 and 1 of S 1444, etc.,) and his grants are frequently met with in the Nanjangud, Chamarajanagar and Gundlupet Taluks. (E. C. Ill Nanjangud 196 of S’ 1435; T.-Narsipur 42 of S’ 1445; T.-Narsipur 73 of S’ 1441 : E. C. IV Gundlup6t 1, 3, 35; Chamarajanagar 99 of S 1445, 111 etc.) In some of these records, their gotra is given as Kaundinya and not as Khandava. The temple of Kirtinarayana at Talakad is a Hoysala structure and is believed to have been constructed by king Vishnuvardhana (see M. A. R. 1912, p. 11).

Not only are the revenues of the village stated to have been granted for services in the temple, but also the utsava-images of the god and goddesses with ornaments either newly prepared or belonging to some other temple are said to have been sent from Vijayanagar, the capital.

The grant is stated to have been made at the insistence of a Brahman named Upavasi- Achariya. The usual imprecatory stanzas are found at the end of the grant.

== See also ==
- Indian inscriptions
- Indian copper plate inscriptions
- Early Indian epigraphy
- Epigraphia Carnatica
- History of Karnataka
- Timeline of Karnataka
- Etymology of Karnataka
- Old Kannada § Origin
