= Shravanabelagola inscription =

7th century inscription in Karnataka

The Shravanabelagola inscription of Nandisena, dated to the 7th century, is one of the early poetic inscriptions in the Kannada language. The inscription extols saint Nandisena of Shravanabelagola (a prominent place of Jain religious power and worship) and his journey to heaven ("world of gods", lit, devaloka). According to the Institute for Classical Kannada Studies the inscription, which it dates to 700 A.D., is suffused with literary characteristics and figure of speech. It is therefore important to the study of the development of Kannada literature. According to the scholar D.R. Nagaraj, exalting the "individual as the hero of the community" is the commonality the Nandisena inscription has with the other metrical Kannada inscriptions of the period; the Halmidi inscription and the Kappe Arabhatta inscription.

== Text of Inscription ==
Romanized	In the Modern Kannada script	English translation
surachApambOle vidyulltegaLa teRavOl manjuvOl tOri bEgaM parigum shrI rUpa lIlA dhana vibhava mahArAshigaL nillav Arggam paramArttham mechche nAn I dharaNiyuL iravAn endu sanyasanam ge ydurusatvan nandisEna pravara munivaran dEvalOkakke sandAn	ಸುರಚಾಪಂ ಬೋಲೆ ವಿದ್ಯುಲ್ಲತೆಗಳ ತೆರವೋಲ್ ಮಂಜುವೋಲ್ ತೋರಿ ಬೇ ಗಂ ಪರಿಗುಂ ಶ್ರೀ ರೂಪ ಲೀಲಾ ಧನ ವಿಭವ ಮಹಾರಾಶಿಗಳ್ ನಿಲ್ಲವಾರ್ಗ್ಗಂ ಪರಮಾರ್ತ್ಥಂ ಮೆಚ್ಚೆ ನಾನ್ ಈ ಧರಣಿಯುಳ್ ಇರವಾನ್ ಎನ್ದು ಸನ್ಯಸನಂ ಗೆ ಯ್ದುರುಸತ್ವನ್ ನನ್ದಿಸೇನ ಪ್ರವರ ಮುನಿವರನ್ ದೇವಲೋಕಕ್ಕೆ ಸನ್ದಾನ್.	Rapidly vanishing like the rainbow, like clustering flashes of lightning, or like a dewy cloud, to whom are the treasures of beauty, pleasure, wealth and power secure? Thus saying, having assumed the state of sanyasi, the great might one, Nandi Sena, best and most excellent of munis reached the world of gods (deva loka)

== See also ==
- Jainism in Karnataka
- Jainism in north Karnataka
- Jainism in Tulu Nadu
