= Tyagada Brahmadeva Pillar =

Pillar in Shravanabelagola, Karnataka, India

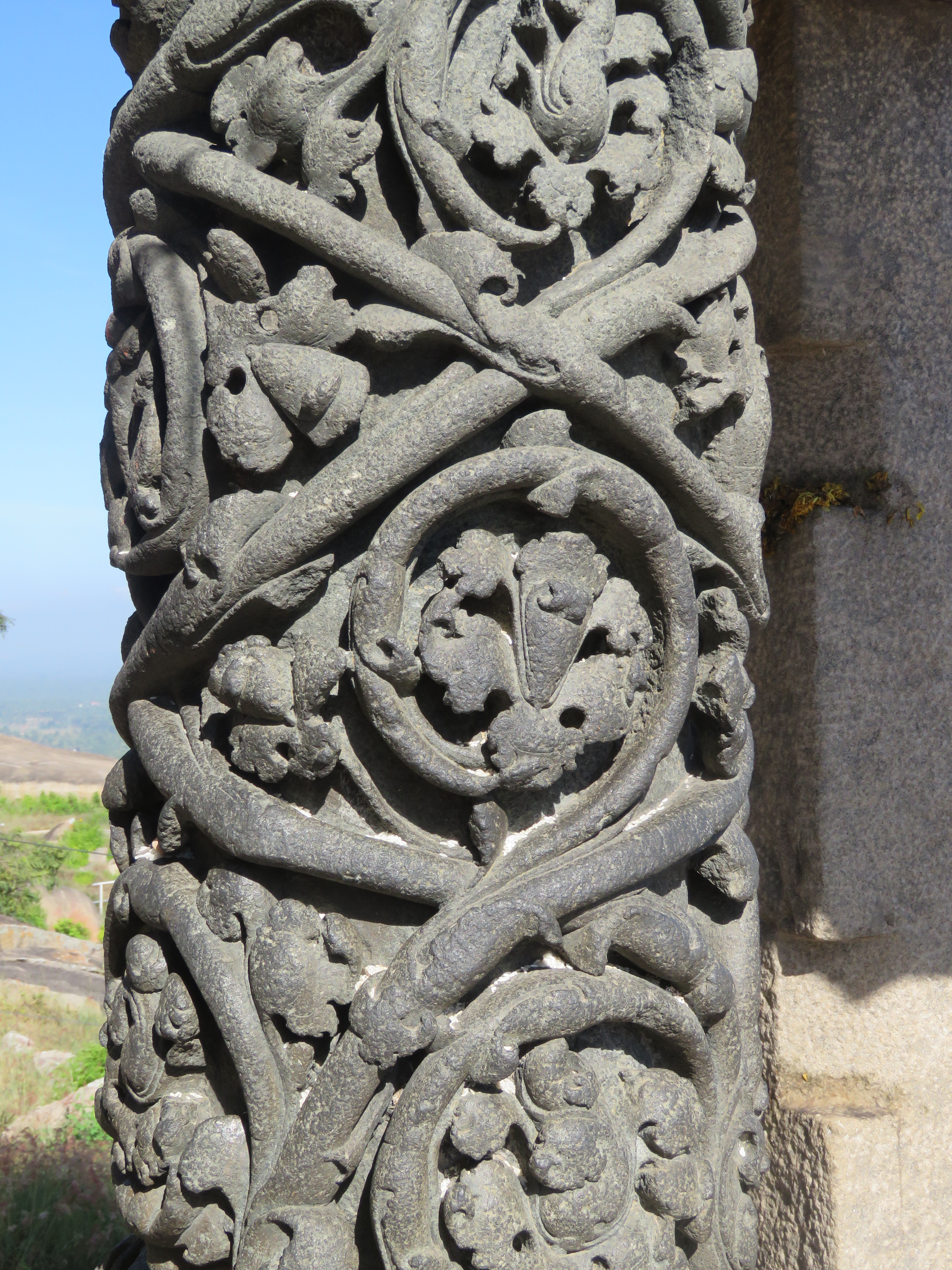
Section of the Tyagada Brahmadeva pillar with relief in floral design

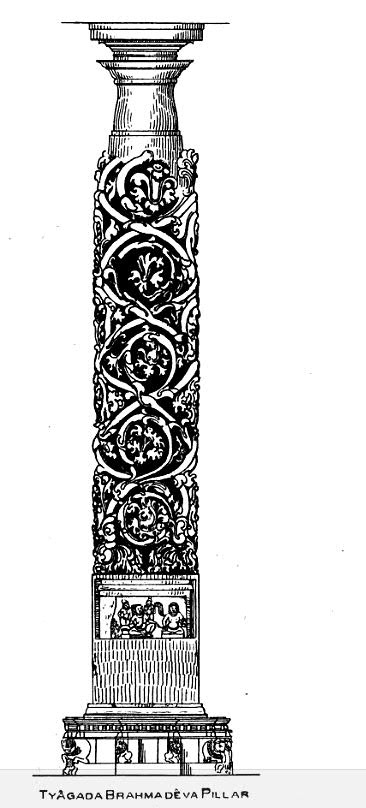
Tyagada Brahmadeva Pillar (2.3 m tall) at Shravanabelagola

The Tyagada Brahmadeva Pillar (or Chhagada Brahmadeva Pillar) is a decorated free standing pillar (lit, Stambha), 2.3 m tall, commissioned by Chamundaraya, an important minister and commander in the Western Ganga kingdom, during the rule of King Marasimha II (963–975), Rachamalla IV (975–986) and Rachamalla V. The pillar dates to around 983 C.E. and exists on the Vindyagiri hill (called Dodda Betta in local Kannada language) in the important Jain heritage town Shravanabelagola, in the Karnataka state, India. On the base of the pillar, on the north side, is an inscription in old Kannada language of the same period, which according to epigraphist and historian B.L. Rice confirms Chamundaraya's involvement in the erection of the pillar. Free standing pillars are a characteristic feature of the Western Ganga art and are broadly classified as "Mahastambha" (or "Manastambha", "Indrastambha") and "Brahmastambha".

The pillar was enclosed (around 1700) with an enclosure, open below, so that from the side only some of its length is visible.

== Features ==
The pillar stands facing the enclosure leading to the monolith of Gommateshwara (Bahubali). On the shaft of the pillar are floral carvings depicting creepers and bell-shaped flowers. It has a square base with images of two important 10th-century Jain personalities, Chamundaraya and his guru Nemichandra carved out is relief on one face of the base. They are seated on a platform (adhisthana) and the guru appears to be receiving an object from his disciple with his right hand. They are flanked by attendants (chouri or fan bearers) while Chamundaraya's queen Gagan, her hair tied in a knot, is seen in the background.

In the words of the art critic Fergusson,

"If any one wished to select one feature of Indian architecture which has its perfection and weakness there are probably no objects more suited for this purpose than these free-standing pillars.

It was a common practice among the 10th century kings of the Western Ganga dynasty to erect free-standing pillars in front of Jain basadis. According to the art critic and historian S. Settar, generally "Brahmadeva" pillars found in front of ancient Jain temples do not house sculptures of the Brahma Yaksha or the god Brahma, rather these pillars find their origins in the "Manastambha" and house an image of the Sarvanubhuti Yaksha (a benevolent spirit). According to the historian I. K. Sarma, the term may have originated from "Bhrm" meaning to "wander around".

== Old Kannada inscription ==
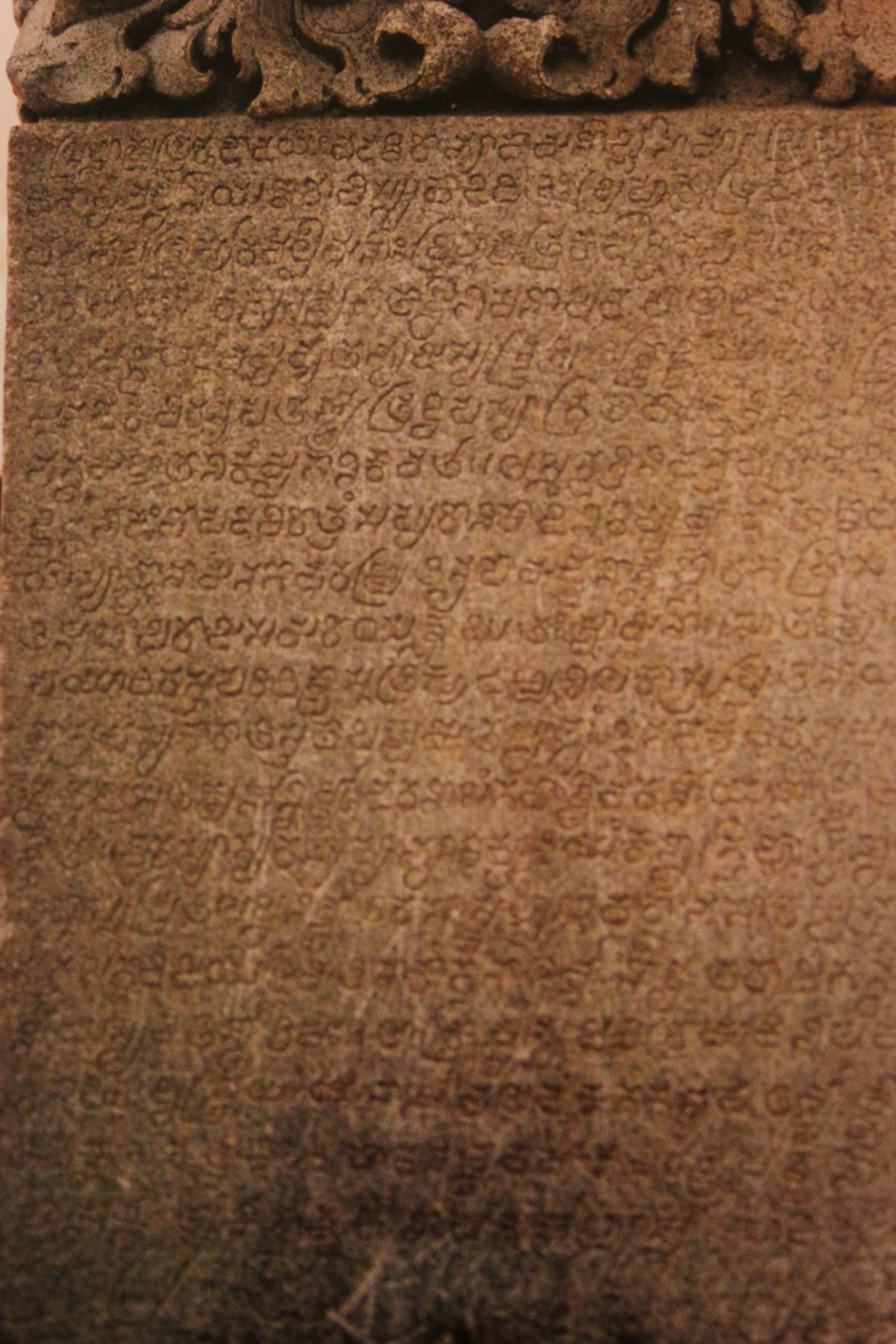
Old Kannada inscription (983 CE) on north face of Tyagada Brahmadeva pillar

According to B. L. Rice, the inscription on the north face contains an account by Chamundaraya himself. The original inscription (983 C.E.) was made on all four faces of the square base. However, at present, only the inscription on the north face is intact. According to Rice, the rest of the original inscription appears to have been erased at the instance of Heggade Kanna, a later day chief. Chief Kanna, while installing the image of a Yaksha (an attendant of the god of wealth Kubera) at the top of the pillar, had a minor inscription no longer than two and a half lines of old Kannada (dated to about 1180 A.D.) dedicated to his deed inscribed on the south face of the base. This according to Rice deprived historians from getting complete information about the erection of the pillar.

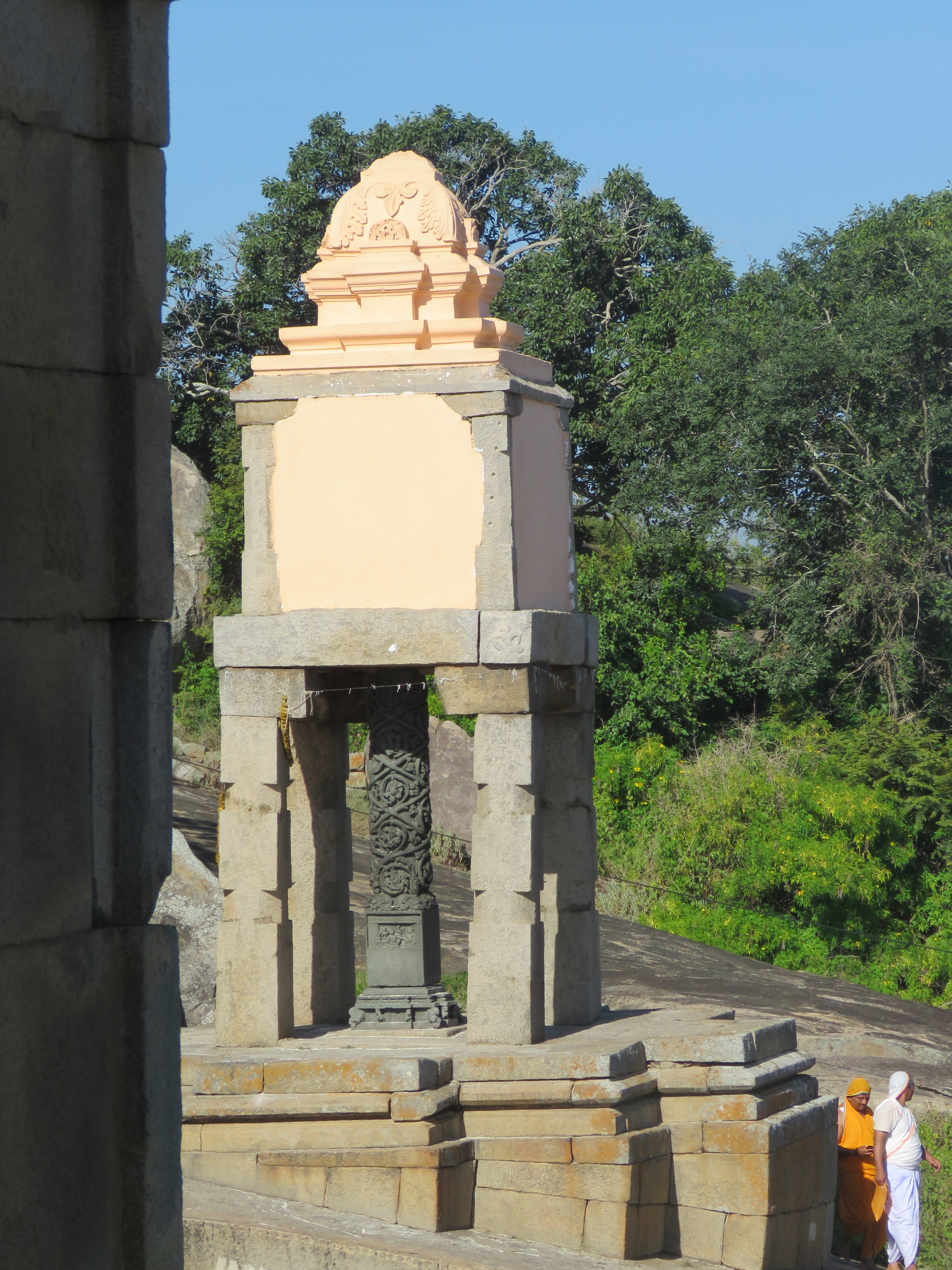
The pillar and its platform

== See also ==
- Jainism in Karnataka
- Jainism in north Karnataka
- Jainism in Tulu Nadu
