= Gunavarma I =

Indian writer

Gunavarma I was an early Kannada language poet who authored two Mahakavya (epic poems), the Shudraka and the Harivamsha around 900 CE.

His works are considered extinct but are found referenced in later years. According to historians Kamath and Narasimhacharya (also a Kannada language expert), he was patronised by Western Ganga Dynasty King Ereganga Neetimarga II (also called Ereyappa) in the late 9th century and early 10th century period.
