= Kappe Arabhatta =

- Location: Badami, Karnataka, India

Site notes
- Architectural style: inscription consists of five stanzas written out in ten lines

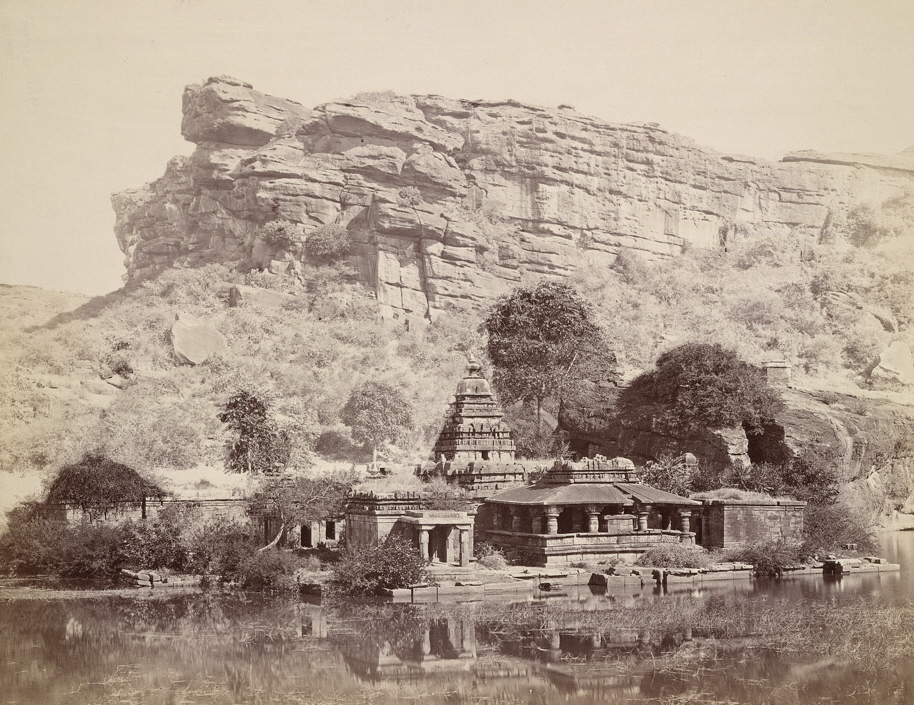
1880s photograph of cliff overlooking the Bhutanatha temple on the eastern end of the artificial lake in Badami. The Kappe Arabhatta inscription is carved on a cliff overlooking the northeast end.

Kappe Arabhatta (Kannada: ಕಪ್ಪೆ ಅರಭಟ್ಟ) was a Chalukya warrior of the 8th century who is known from a Kannada verse inscription, dated to c. 700 CE, and carved on a cliff overlooking the northeast end of the artificial lake in Badami, Karnataka, India. The inscription consists of five stanzas written out in ten lines in the Kannada script. Stanza 2 (Lines 3 and 4) consists of a Sanskrit śloka. Of the remaining stanzas, all except the first are in the tripadi, a Kannada verse metre.

Stanza 3 (lines 5 and 6), which consists of twelve words of which nine are Sanskrit words in Kannada, is well known in a condensed version, and is sometimes cited as the earliest example of the tripadi metre in Kannada. However, neither stanza 3 nor stanza 4 strictly conform to the precise rules of the tripadi metre; they each have more than 18 moras in line two, in excess of the allowed 17.

== Location ==
According to Gazetteer of the Bombay Presidency 1884, p. 558, the Kappe Arabhatta inscription overlooks the artificial lake (on the south-east corner) of Badami town, and:

Cut on the cliff, ten or twelve feet from the ground, on the north-west of the hamlet of Tattukoti, on the north-east corner of the lake, is an undated inscription of the sixth or seventh century. The way to the cliff is on the left going up from the reservoir by the rear or east ascent to the Bavanbande-kote or north fort and about half-way up to the shrine of Tattukoti Maruti. The writing covers a space of 3 feet 4½ inches high by 2 feet 10⅓ inches broad. The meaning is not clear, but it seems a record of Kappe Arabhatta, a saint of local fame. Below the inscription and covering a space of about 3 feet 7 inches is cut a round band with a floral device apparently a ten-leaved lotus inside it, and with what seems to be a fillet, with a ribbon crossed in a double loop, handing from it.

== Kappe Arabhatta inscription text ==
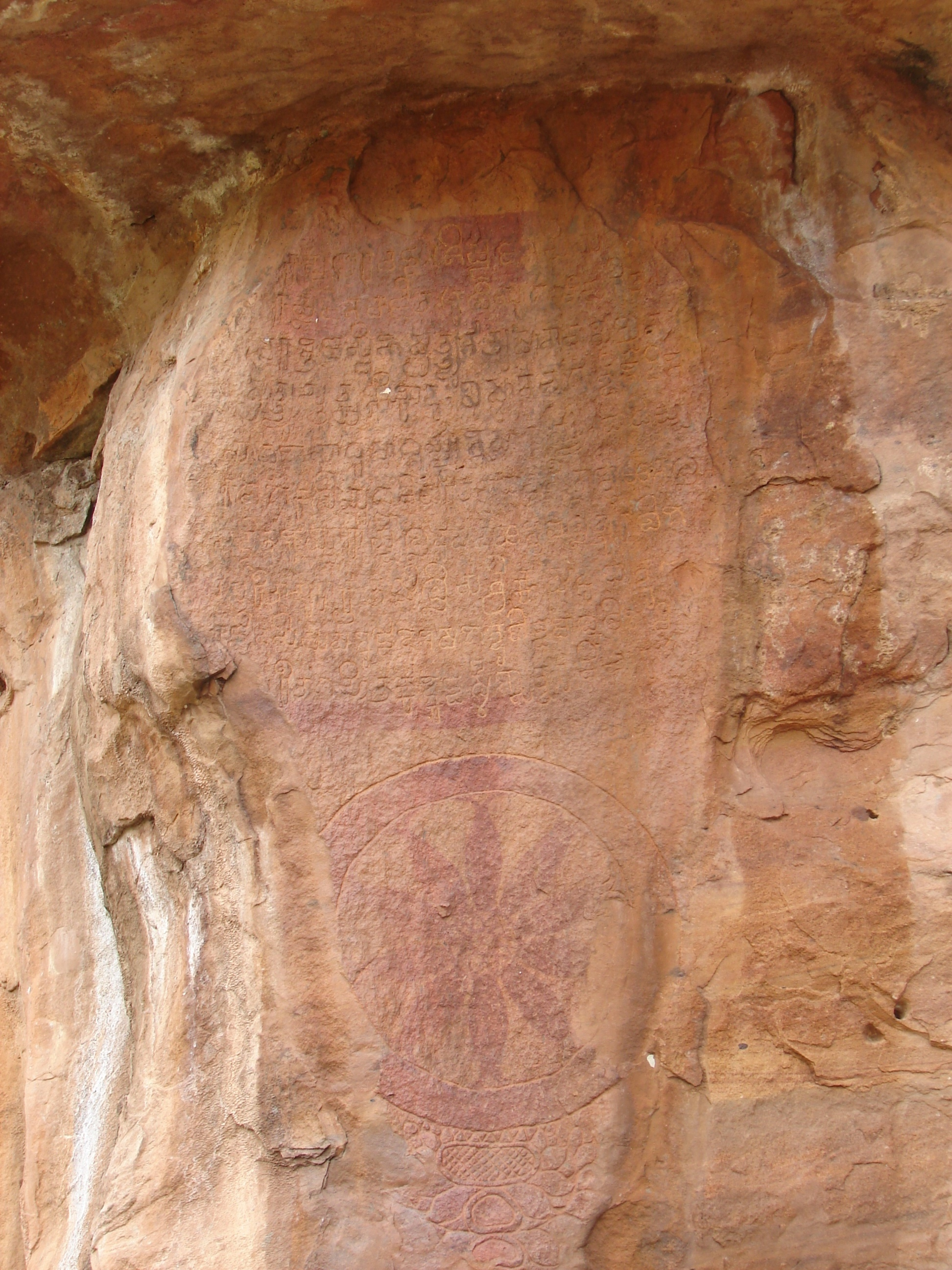
The 7th century Kappe Arabhatta inscription

The following is the text of the five lines written out in ten lines in the inscription. The meanings of the words are provided in the footnotes below the text. Lines 3 and 4 consist of a Sanskrit sloka, and is not translated. Here | denotes the end of each line of the tripadi metre and || , the end of the stanza:

c. 700 A. D. Taṭṭukôṭi Inscription I. A. X. 61
1. (Kannada) Kappe^{1a}-Arabhaṭṭan^{1b} Śiṣṭajana^{1c} priyan^{1c}
2. kaṣṭajanavarjitan^{2a} kaliyugaviparītan^{2b} ||
3. (Sanskrit sloka:) varan-tējasvino mṛittyur na tu mānāvakhaṇḍanam-
4. Mṛttyus tatkṣaṇikō duḥkham mānabhamgam dinēdinē ||
Tripadi:
5.(Kannada) Sādhuge^{5a} Sādhu^{5b} mādhuryange^{5c} mādhuryam^{5d} | bādhippa^{5e}
6. kalige^{6a} kaliyuga^{2b} viparītan^{2b} | mādhavan^{6b} ītan^{6c} peran^{6d} alla^{6e} ||
Tripadi:
(Kannada) 7. oḷḷitta^{7a} keyvōr^{7b} ār^{7c} polladum^{7d} adaramte^{7e} | ballittu^{7f} kalige^{6a}
8. viparītā^{2b} purākṛtam^{8a} | illi^{8b} samdhikkum^{8c} adu^{8d} bamdu^{8e} ||
Tripadi:
(Kannada) 9. kaṭṭida^{9a} Simghaman^{9b} keṭṭodēnemag^{9c} emdu^{9d} | biṭṭavōl^{9e} kalige^{6a} vi-
10. parītamg^{2b} ahitarkkaḷ^{10a} | keṭṭar^{10b} mēṇ^{10c} Sattar^{10d} avicāram^{10e} ||

== Dictionary for Translation of inscription ==
1a "Kappe," Kannada, "a frog; that which hops" and has cognates in related languages: Telugu "kappa - a frog;" Tulu "kappe - a frog, probably from 'kuppu' - to hop, or 'kappu' - to cover;" 1b "Ara" and "bhaṭṭa" are both Prakrit words: the former means "virtue," the latter, itself derives from Sanskrit "bhartā." 1c Śiṣṭajana priyan: Beloved of the good people. Sanskrit. priya,
2a kaṣṭajanavarjitan: avoided by evil people, adj. s. m. sg. nom. qualifying Kappe-Arabhattan. Sanskrit. kaṣṭa, jana, varjita; 2b kaliyugaviparita: an exceptional man in the kaliyuga. Sanskrit, viparita adj. s. m. sg. nom qualifying Kappe-Arabhattan;
5a sadhuge: to the good people. Sanskrit sadhu, s. n.; 5b sadhu: Good, kind, person. Sanskrit. s. m.; 5c madhuryamge: to the sweet. s. m. sg. dat Sanskrit. madhurya-; 5d madhuryam: sweetness. s. m. sg. nom. Sanskrit; 5e bādhippa: causing distress, fut. p. of badhisu - to cause distress, from Sanskrit bādh - to harass.
6a kalige: to the kali age. s. m. sg. dat. Sanskrit . kali-; kali - hero.; 6b: Madhavan: Visnu, Sanskrit. Madhava - s. m. sg. nom.; 6c: ītan: this man, dem. pron. m. Telugu: ītadu - probably i + tān - this self (speaker) or ī + tan - this of mine; 6d: peran: another. From pera - outer place; the outside. MK hera; NK hora; Tamil: piran - a stranger; Malayalam: piran - another; Telugu: pera - another; 6e alla: is not, neg. pr. of intr. al (to be fit); Tamil al, alla-: no, not; Malayalam alla: no, not.
7a oḷḷitta: what is good (adj. s. n.); 7b keyvōr: those who do; 7c ār: who (inter. pron.); 7d polladum: The evil also. adj. s. n. sg. nom. + um (NK holladu, hole)—Tamil: pol—to agree with, negative of this is pollā. Tamil: pollā, pollāda: bad, vicious (neg. of pon: to shine), Malayalam: pollā - to be bad, evil; pollu - hollow, vain, useless; Telugu: pollu - useless; Tulu: polle - slander, backbiting. 7e adaramte - like that (adv.) (adara stem. pron.) amte: adv. p. of an: to speak.; 7f ballittu: Strong adj. s. n.;
8a: purākṛtam: the ancient karma (Fleet); the deeds done in the past. Sanskrit; 8b illi: here. 8c: samdhikkum: 8d adu - it (pron); 8e bamdu - having come (adv. pp. of bar - to come. Tamil vandu; Malayalam vandu; Telugu vacci;
9a kaṭṭida - bound pp. of kattu - to bind; Tamil: kaṭṭu, Malayalam: kaṭṭu; Tulu: kaṭṭu - to bind; 9b simghaman The lion. Sanskrit. simgha-, s. n. sg.; 9c keṭṭodē: harmful thing; 9d en what (intl pron.) 9e biṭṭavōl: in the same way as releasing. adj.;
10a ahitarkkaḷ: the enemies (Sanskrit. ahita- ); 10b keṭṭar : were ruined; 10c mēṇ: and (conjunction, Middle Kannada (MK) mēṇ and mēṇu: what is above, from mēl: above. Malayalam: mēṇ: what is above; superiority; menavan—a superior śudra (modern Malayalam mēnon), replaced by mattu in Modern Kannada. 10d sattar: died; past pl. of sā - to die. Tamil cā - to die, past. Sattān. Malayalam cā - to die; Telugu - caccu - to die; pp. caccina. Tulu sāy, sāi - to die, pp. satta-; 10e avicāram: without foresight. (Fleet translates as "without doubt.") Sanskrit. avicāra.

== Literal translation ==
1 Kappe^{1a} Arabhata,^{1b} beloved of the good people^{1c}
2 avoided by evil people,^{2a} an exceptional man in Kaliyuga^{2b}
5 To the good people,^{5a} good;^{5b} to the sweet,^{5c} sweetness;^{5d} | causing distress^{5e}
6 to the kali age,^{6a} an exceptional man in Kaliyuga,^{2b} | Madhava (or Vishnu),^{6b} this man^{6c} another^{6d} is not^{6e} ||
7 What is good^{7a} those who do^{7b} who^{7c} the evil^{7d} like that^{7e} | strong^{7f}
8 exception to (or opposite)^{2b} the ancient karma^{8a} | here^{8b} samdhikkum^{8c} it^{8d} having come^{8e} ||
9 Bound^{9a} the lion^{9b} harmful thing^{9c} what^{9d} | in the same way as releasing^{9e} (Translated in (Narasimhia 1941, p. 242), "In the same way as releasing the bound lion, saying 'What is the harm to us?'")
10 exception to or opposite^{2b} the enemies^{10a} | were ruined^{10b} and^{10c} died^{10d} without foresight (or without doubt)^{10e} || (Note: 10c, 10d, and 10e are translated in (Narasimhia 1941, p. 239) as "And they died undoubtedly (for want of foresight)")

== Popular version of Stanza 3 in Kannada script ==
A condensed version of Stanza 3 seems to be well known, both in the Kannada script:

Kannada: ಸಾಧುಗೆ ಸಾಧು
ಮಾಧುರ್ಯಂಗೆ ಮಾಧುರ್ಯಂ
ಬಾಧಿಪ್ಪ ಕಲಿಗೆ ಕಲಿಯುಗ ವಿಪರೀತನ್
ಮಾಧವನೀತಂ ಪೆರನಲ್ಲ!

and in the English poetic rendering:

"Kind man to the kind,
Who's sweet to the sweet,
Very cruel to the cruel
He was not unlike Lord Vishnu in this regard"

== See also ==
- Badami
- Chalukya dynasty
- Kannada literature
