= Old Kannada =

Ancient form of the Kannada language

- Native to: South India
- Region: Karnataka
- Era: 9th century CE
- Language family: Dravidian: Southern; Southern I; Tamil–Kannada; Kannada–Badaga; Old Kannada
- Writing system: Kannada script

Language codes
- ISO 639-3: kan
- Glottolog: oldk1250

Old Kannada (Kannada: ಹಳೆಗನ್ನಡ, romanized: haḷegannaḍa) is the earliest attested stage of the Kannada language, known primarily from the inscriptional record going back to the 4th-5th century CE in Halmidi inscription from the reign of the Kadambas of Banavasi. The earliest known literary work in Kannada is the Kavirājamārga (9th century CE). This work describes Kannada poetics as well as grammar to some extent, citing earlier authorities and forms of the language. The Śabdamaṇidarpaṇa of Kēśirāja, dating to the 13th century CE, is the earliest systematic grammar of Kannada, which remains authoritative today.

Sanskrit grammars of Kannada also exist, drawing on the Sanskrit tradition of Pāṇinī. These include the Karṇāṭakabhāṣābhūṣaṇa of Nagavarma II, composed prior to Kēśirāja (12th century CE), and the Karṇāṭaka Śabdānuśāsana of Bhaṭṭākalaṅka Dēva was composed in the 16th century CE. Later commentaries on Śabdamaṇidarpaṇa include the 16th century Sūtrānvayaratnamāle of Liṅgaṇārādhya and the 18th century commentary by Niṣṭhūra (or Niṭṭūru) Nañjayya. Despite being called "Old Kannada", this stage of Kannada was frequently revived in courtly literature, as the Śabdamaṇidarpaṇa was the standard for literary Kannada well into the early modern period. Even while Middle Kannada emerged, court poets would continue to use the morphology and style of Old Kannada to generate a "classical" style.

== Origin ==
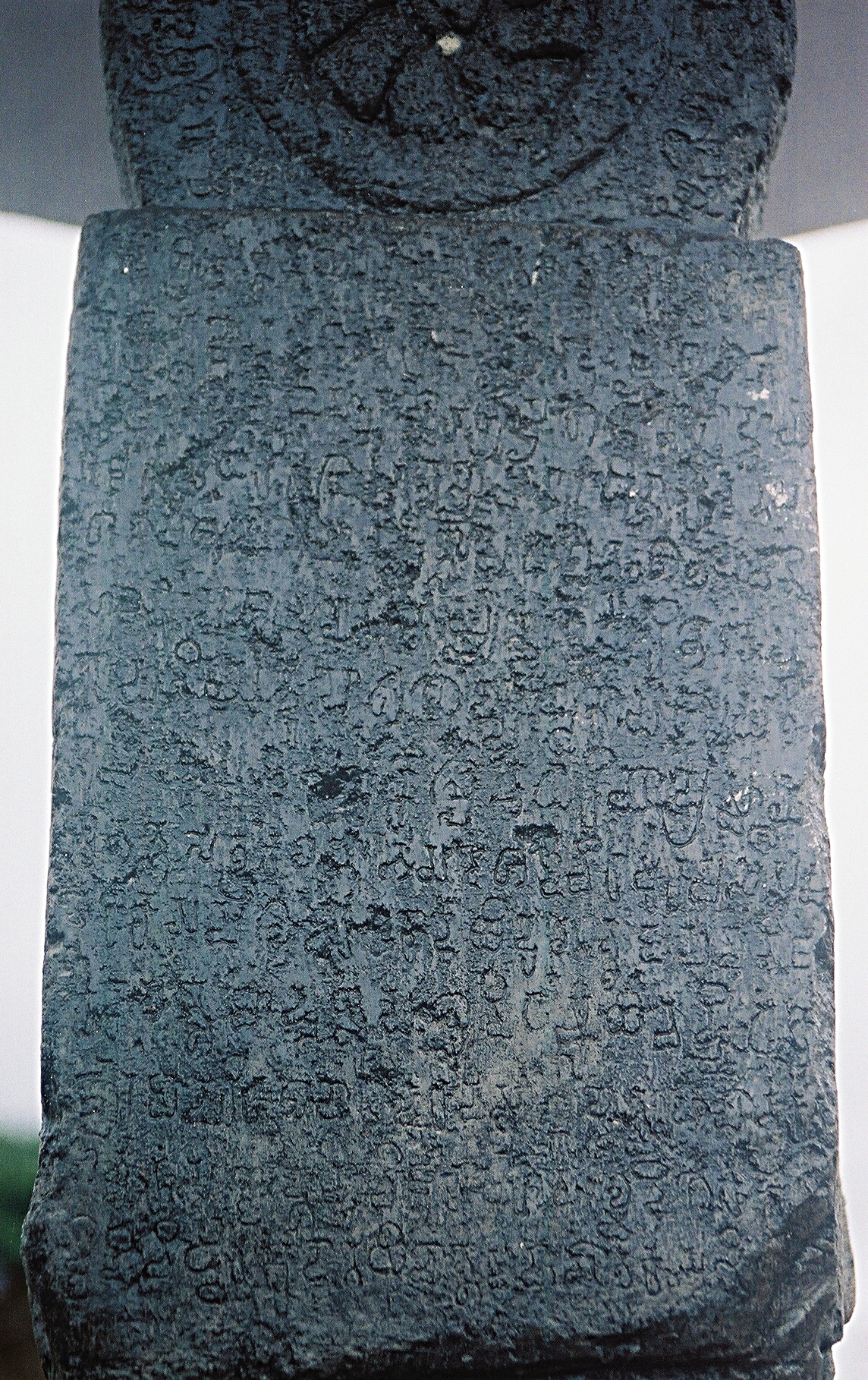
A replica of the original Halmidi inscription at Halmidi village

A 5th century copper coin was discovered at Banavasi with an inscription in the Kannada script, one of the oldest such coins ever discovered.

In a report published by the Mysore Archaeological Department in 1936, Dr. M. H. Krishna, (the Director of Archaeology of the erstwhile Mysore state) who discovered the inscription in 1936 dated the inscription to 450 CE. This inscription in old-Kannada was found in Halmidi village near Hassan district. Many other inscriptions having Kannada words had been found like the Brahmagiri edict of 230 BCE by Ashoka. But this is the first full scale inscription in Kannada. Kannada was used in the inscriptions from the earliest times and the Halmidi inscription is considered to be the earliest epigraph written in Kannada. This inscription is generally known as the Halmidi inscription and consists of sixteen lines carved on a sandstone pillar. It has been dated to 450 CE and demonstrates that Kannada was used as a language of administration at that time. Dr K.V.Ramesh has hypothesized that, compared to possibly contemporaneous Sanskrit inscriptions, "Halmidi inscription has letters which are unsettled and uncultivated, no doubt giving an impression, or rather an illusion, even to the trained eye, that it is, in date, later than the period to which it really belongs, namely the fifth century A.D." The original inscription is kept in the Office of the Director of Archaeology and Museums, Govt. of Karnataka, Mysore, and a fibreglass replica has been installed in Halmidi. A maṇṭapa to house a fibreglass replica of the original inscription has been built at Halmidi village. The Government has begun to promote the village as a place of historical interest.

Evidence from edicts during the time of Ashoka the Great suggests that the Kannada script and its literature were influenced by Buddhist literature. The Halmidi inscription, the earliest attested full-length inscription in the Kannada language and script, is dated to 450 CE while the earliest available literary work, the Kavirajamarga, has been dated to 850 CE. References in the Kavirājamārga indicate an earlier tradition of Kannada literature, including genres such the bedaṇḍe, cattāṇa and melvāḍu forms during earlier centuries. The 5th century Tamatekallu inscription of Chitradurga, and the Chikkamagaluru inscription of 500 CE are further examples.

== Phonology ==
Old Kannada’s phonology is virtually identical to that of Modern Kannada, having five groups of "classed" (vargīya) sounds, comprising contrastive voice, aspiration, and nasal stops, along with "unclassed" (avargīya) sounds, which includes fricatives, approximants, and laterals. Vowels are distinguished as short (hrasva) and long (dīrgha). Kēśirāja and other grammarians classify certain sounds as native to Kannada and those shared with Sanskrit, though not all agree on whether aspirates or the vocalic liquids of Sanskrit (ṛ and ḷ, as well as their long counterparts) are considered native. The ಳ ⟨ḷ⟩ that occurs in native Kannada words (and which may alternate with ಲ in certain places) is called ಕುಳ (kuḷa), while the ಳ ⟨ḷ⟩ that occurs in Sanskrit words is called ಕ್ಷಳ (kṣaḷa).

	Front		Central		Back	
	short	long	short	long	short	long
Close	i (ಇ)	iː (ಈ)			u (ಉ)	uː (ಊ)
Mid	e (ಎ)	eː (ಏ)			o (ಒ)	oː (ಓ)
Open			a (ಅ)	aː (ಆ)		

		Labial	Dental	Alveolar	Retroflex	Palatal	Velar	Glottal
Nasal		m (ಮ)	n (ನ)		ṇ (ಣ)	ñ (ಞ)	ṅ (ಙ)	
Stop	Voiceless	p (ಪ)	t (ತ)		ṭ (ಟ)	c (ಚ)	k (ಕ)	
Stop	Aspirated	pʰ (ಫ)	tʰ (ಥ)		ṭʰ (ಠ)	cʰ (ಛ)	kʰ (ಖ)	
Stop	Voiced	b (ಬ)	d (ದ)		ḍ (ಡ)	j (ಜ)	g (ಗ)	
Stop	Breathy	bʰ (ಭ)	dʰ (ಧ)		ḍʰ (ಢ)	jʰ (ಝ)	gʰ (ಘ)	
Fricative			s (ಸ)		ṣ (ಷ)	ś (ಶ)		h (ಹ)
Approximant		v (ವ)				y (ಯ)		
Rhotic				r (ರ)~ṟ (ಱ)				
Lateral	Approximant		l (ಲ)		ḷ (ಳ)~ ḻ (ೞ)			

Kēśirāja also classifies certain consonants as śithila ("slack, loose"), namely r, l, ḷ, and ḻ, listing words where these sounds may be dropped or are mandatory. Sounds that are considered "slack" are those which may be pronounced such that they lose their syllabic weight. For example, sorku ("madness") is ordinarily scanned as having a heavy and light syllable, but because the r is considered "slack", it may be scanned as two light syllables. This feature of Kannada is frequently used to meet different metrical requirements in verse (see Kannada prosody).

Old Kannada, like certain varieties of Modern Kannada, also exhibits nasality. Kēśirāja indicates that the sounds y, v, and l may be nasal or non-nasal, though he has no clear way of marking this in his commentary. Kulli remarks that these are merely allophonic variations of sounds that come from a neighboring nasal consonant. However, B. Ramachandra Rao points out that the bindu or anusvāra, which is usually pronounced m at the end of words, varies with n word-finally and, m varies with v intervocalically (ex. māva, "mother's brother" also occurs as māma). This may explain why certain instances of y, v, and l are thought to be nasal, especially because certain cognates in other South Indian languages (such as Tamil) point to specific instances where nasality occurs. For example, nāmbu "we (inclusive)" in Tamil is cognate with the Kannada nāvu, which is sometimes pronounced with a nasal vowel. The word māva can also be similarly nasalized.

=== ಱ (ṟa) and ೞ (ḻa) ===
There are also two letters used in Old Kannada that do not appear in Modern Kannada: ೞ ⟨ḻ⟩ and ಱ ⟨ṟ⟩, which are usually pronounced the same as ಳ ⟨ḷ⟩ and ರ ⟨r⟩, respectively. The letter ಱ ⟨ṟ⟩ is also known as the ಶಕಟರೇಫೆ (śakaṭa-rēphe, "the cart-shaped r"), for its resemblance to a cart. Similarly, the ೞ ⟨ḻ⟩ is also called ಱೞ (ṟaḻa, "the ṟa-shaped ḻa") because the two letters resemble one another. These names help to distinguish them (especially since their pronunciations are identical) from ಳ ⟨ḷ⟩ and ರ ⟨r⟩. These commonly appear in modern printed editions of classical texts and Old Kannada manuscripts, and it is not clear that these consonants were truly distinguished outside of writing. Kēśirāja describes the pronunciation of these letters as follows:

ಅತಿಪೀಡನದಿಂ ರೇಫಾ
ಶ್ರಿತಮಾದ ಱಕಾರಮುಂ ಸಮಂತು ಡಕಾರಾ
ಶ್ರೀತಮಾದ ಱೞನುಮಂಗೀ
ಕೃತಪದಲತ್ವಕೆ ಸನೇಮ ಸಲ್ಲದ ಕುಳನುಂ

ati-pīḍanadiṃ rēphā-
śritam āda ṟakāramuṃ samantu ḍa-kārā-
śritam āda ṟaḻanumaṅgī-
kṛtapadalatvake sanēma sallad kuḷanam

Greater force applied to
the r-sound is the ṟ-sound, and likewise
the ṟ-shaped ḻ-sound with the ḍ-sound;
by the same rule, the l-sound is not the ḷ-sound.

Kēśirāja gives a number of examples of improper alliterations (prāsa) to demonstrate that these sounds are pronounced differently. In practice, many poets used these apparently improper alliterations, and in his Girijākalyāṇa, the poet Harihara (13th century CE) rejected the continued distinction of these letters. This suggests that these letters may not have been pronounced differently, or at least not sufficiently so to merit maintaining Kēśirāja's rule. This is even suggested by the fact that Kēśirāja teaches that r and ḻ may alliterate when form part of a conjunct consonant, and that there are instances where ḷ is preferred to ḻ.

Rao writes that it is not known whether ḻ and ḷ were still distinguished in speech by the time of the Pampa Bhārata (942 CE), but does suggest that all of these consonants were distinguished in minimal pairs, if only in writing. He also records a number of alternations in the Pampa Bhārata between r, l, ḷ, ḻ, and ṟ. J.S. Kulli similarly writes these letters seem to be regularly confused or switched, though he writes that r and ṟ were definitely distinct. R. Narasimhacharya also points out that many native words in Kannada are distinguished only by these letters, evidenced by their parallels with Tamil and historical spellings in Telugu.

== Grammar ==
Old Kannada nouns are marked for case and plurality. In some cases, nouns must first be formed as an oblique stem by adding an augment (āgama). Gender is not explicitly marked on nouns unless they mark animate beings, which is to say humans or personified figures (ex. deities). Sanskrit nouns, despite having lexical or grammatical gender, are declined as though they were neuter nouns. Semantically, however, they are treated according to their original gender when it marks a human being, and this is usually only apparent if there is a finite verb in the third person (where gender is marked).

B. Ramachandra Rao describes six noun classes based on syllable structure and other characteristics in his descriptive grammar of the Old Kannada work, the Pampa Bhārata. It is worth noting that Kēśirāja does not systematically describe which nouns receive which augment, instead just listing broad categories of nouns by their augment.

	Subtype	Characteristics	Oblique augment	Example
Class I	1a	Roots that take gender-number markers, including third person pronoun roots ava- and āta-	Ø	tamma(n) ("younger brother") ava(ḷ) ("she") arasa(r) ("king(s)") bandhu(gaḷ) ("relatives")
Class I	1b	Roots with sonorant finals -ṇ, -n, y, l, and ḷ; these double following a short vowel	Ø	kāl ("leg") kaṇṇ ("eye")
Class I	1c	Inanimate nouns with disyllabic roots with final -i and -e	Ø	giḷi(y) ("parrot") tale(y) ("head")
Class II		Roots ending in -u or -ū	-in	kāḍu ("forest") -> kāḍin hū ("flower") -> hūvin
Class III		Sanskrit nouns and inanimate, native Kannada nouns with final -a	-v/d	mēgha(m)/mēghad("cloud") mara(m)/marad ("tree")
Class IV		Native Kannada nouns indicating directions and location	-aṇ	keḷage ("down/below") -> kelagaṇ mūḍu ("east") -> mūḍaṇ
Class V		Roots denoting number; the oblique of the interrogative ēnu forms in this class	-aṟ	ondu -> ondaṟ ēnu -> ētaṟ
Class VI		Pronominal roots in the first and second person	short and long roots in different cases	nān ("I") ~ nan(n) nāv ("we") ~ nam(m)

=== Pronouns ===
Old Kannada has three classes of pronouns: personal, demonstrative, and interrogative. There are no relative pronouns – relative clauses are formed affixing verbal participles to pronouns. Personal pronouns included the first and second person, as well as reflexives, forming their own class of oblique stem, where some cases use a "strong" stem with a doubled final nasal, and others use a "weak" stem with a single nasal. In Old Kannada, variants of the first person pronouns without the initial n existed before being supplanted by the nasal-initial form (not unlike Old Tamil yān "I" being replaced by nān). However, the oblique stem continues to reflect the existence of the vowel-initial form.

	Nominative	Oblique
I	ān/nān	en(n)-
we	ām/nām	nam(m)-
you (sg.)	nīn-	nin(n)-
you (pl.)	nīm-	nim(m)-
self (sg.)	tān	tan(n)-
self (pl.)	tām	tam(m)-

The third person was conveyed by demonstrative pronouns, which are part of a different oblique class. Demonstrative pronouns were composed of two morphemes: a spatial deictic prefix (a- "that (over there)", u- "that (there)" i- "this") and a person-number-gender termination, generally homophonous with the morph used in verbal agreement. However, interrogative prefixes could also be used in place of the deictic prefixes, using the stem ē- or its variant yā-. In earlier stages of Old Kannada, the interrogative pronouns required number agreement, but this later gave way to the singular forms being used for all numbers. The u- forms marking the medial deixis are attested, but quickly disappeared by the medieval period.

Old Kannada Demonstrative and Interrogative Pronouns
		Proximal	Medial	Distal	Interrogative	
		Proximal	Medial	Distal	Singular	Plural
singular	masculine	ivan	uvan	avan	yāvan	
singular	feminine	ivaḷ	uvaḷ	avaḷ	yāvaḷ	
singular	neuter	idu	udu	adu	yāvadu	ēm ēn
plural	human	ivar	uvar	avar	yāvar	ār
plural	non-human	ivu	uvu	avu	yāvavu	ēm ēn

Whereas most other South Dravidian languages attest the change in the masculine suffix wherein Proto-Dravidian *-anṯᵊ > *-an, Old Kannada retains the earlier form in some plurals, such as avandir “they” (< *aḥ-anṯ-ir) in lieu of avar “id.”

=== Declensions ===
Old Kannada nouns are declined in six cases: the nominative, the accusative, the instrumental-ablative, the dative, the genitive, and the locative. While some scholars believe that these cases are mostly combinations of nouns serving as postpositions with the genitive case marked by the oblique stem plus the suffix -a, J.S. Kulli argues that it is difficult to ascertain existent words for some of them.

For example, traditional grammarians like Kēśirāja teach an additional ablative case, on the model of Sanskrit. It is transparently formed with the demonstrative atta, "here" in the instrumental, attaṇin. This ablative, according to Kulli, does not appear in the inscriptional record. The instrumental case frequently covers the use of the ablative, and the prescribed ablative using attaṇin is rarely seen in literature.

Some variants of the locative, such as uḷ and al, are thought to be remnants of the defective verbs for "to be". The most common ending, however, is -oḷ, and it is later replaced by -alli.

Case	mara (“tree”)	adu (“it”)	beṭṭa (“hill”)
Nominative	maram	adu	beṭṭam
Accusative	maranan	adan	beṭṭaman
Instrumental-ablative	maradin maradindam maradinde marade	adaṟin adaṟindam adaṟinde adaṟe	beṭṭadin beṭṭadindam beṭṭadinde beṭṭade
Dative	marakke marake	adaṟke	beṭṭakke beṭṭake
Ablative	maradattaṇiṁ maradattaṇindaṁ maradattaṇinde	adaṟattaṇiṁ adaṟattaṇindaṁ adaṟattaṇinde	beṭṭadattaṇiṁ beṭṭadattaṇindaṁ beṭṭadattaṇinde
Genitive	marana marada	adaṟa	beṭṭada
Locative	maraduḷ maradoḷ maradal maradali maradalli	adaṟuḷ adaṟoḷ adaṟal adaṟali adaṟalli	beṭṭaduḷ beṭṭadoḷ beṭṭadal beṭṭadali beṭṭadalli

=== Nominal derivation ===
In Old Kannada, nouns can be derived from verbal and adjectival roots using various suffixes. Some suffixes, such as -ke/ge, -vu/pu, and -me denote an abstract noun, whose precise sense can vary according to context. Kēśirāja dedicates the fourth chapter of the Śabdamaṇidarpaṇa to describing a number of different nominal-derivative suffixes, including agentive suffixes, such as -iga and -kāṟa/gāṟa, and attributive suffixes, like -uḷḷa and -oḍeya.

According to Kulli, Kannada adjectives behave rather like derived nouns, as they usually take the relevant number- and gender-marking suffixes when they stand alone (cikkadu "the little one"), asiyaḷ ("the slender (woman/girl)"), and precede a modified head noun either separately or in compound (ex. kempu jeḍe VS keñjeḍe ("red locks"). There are relatively few "pure" adjectives in Kannada, meaning words that serve exclusively as modifiers. Some of these adjectival roots have additional forms that occur in derived forms or compound (ex. piṟi "great/elder") -> pempu "greatness" or kisugal "red stone; ruby").

Sanskrit nouns in Old Kannada are incorporated in two varieties: tatsama ("same as it [i.e. Sanskrit]") and tadbhava ("having the meaning of it [i.e. Sanskrit]). The former preserve the structure of Sanskrit words, while the latter modify it while preserving the basic meaning. The main way Sanskrit nouns enter Kannada is as compound words, which are frequently taken in apposition to their predicates.

Feminine Sanskrit nouns ending in ā always change this final vowel to e (ex. bālā "girl" -> bāle, sītā "Sītā (the goddess)" -> sīte). Sometimes, neuter nouns ending in a undergo this change as well (ex. udāharaṇa "example" -> udāharaṇe). While not explicitly stated, Sanskrit nouns used to describe masculine subjects or predicates must take the gender marker -n in the singular, and plurals must take -r or -gaḷ. Feminine nouns can be marked with -ḷ in an analogous way, but this is rare and Sanskrit feminine nouns usually take -e unless they are adjectives.

Nouns ending in long ī and ū shorten their final vowels unless they are monosyllabic (ex. camū "army" -> camu versus kṣmā "earth"). Nouns ending in ṛ sometimes change their final vowel to -āra (which is the accusative singular ending of most such nouns, minus the final -m). Consonant-final nouns usually double their final consonant and take a final u if it is a plosive (ex. vāk "speech" -> vākku, or if it is a sonorant, they will optionally drop the final consonant (manas "mind/heart" -> manassu or mana). Certain nouns ending in consonants take their Sanskrit nominative plurals and drop the final visarga (ḥ) to be used as nominal stems in the plural or the singular (ex. vidvat "scholar" -> vidvāṃsar ("scholars"), hanumat "Hanuman (the god)" -> hanumanta ("Hanuman (singular)"). Many of these rules have carried over to Modern Kannada and serve to derive new words from Sanskrit.

=== Verbs ===
Like nouns, Old Kannada verbs are inflected for various features: number, grammatical person (and gender in the 3rd person), tense, and aspect. The table below summarizes B. Ramachandra Rao's description of Old Kannada verb stem formation. While these classes largely revolve around the formation of the past tense, some of them are differentiated in the non-past and non-finite forms (noted where relevant). The table below is not comprehensive; it describes forms that appear in the Pampa Bhārata; many variant forms exist in the Old Kannada corpus, especially in inscriptions. Literary commentators will sometimes designate these forms as erroneous.

The past sign is -du, which undergoes sandhi in certain classes and requires the euphonic augment -i after heavy stems (i.e. a long root vowel or short root vowel with a final consonant), while the non-past sign (indicating present and future) is -va. The continuous aspect marker -uta(m)/-utta(m) also exists, though it does not receive pronominal endings directly.

	Subtype	Characteristics of Stem	Verb Root Example	Past Participle	Non-past Participle	Non-finite forms
Class I	1a	Monosyllabic, short root vowels ending in -l, -r, and -ḷ	ir "to be/exist" aḷ "to cry"	irdu aḻtu	irpa aḻva	N/A
Class I	1b	Monosyllabic, long root vowel with sonorant finals	kēḷ "to listen/hear"	kēḷdu	kēḻva	N/A
Class I	1c	Disyllabic, short i or e as the root vowel, with sonorant final	usiru "to breathe"	usirdu	usirva	N/A
Class I	1d	Disyllabic, short a or u as the root vowel, with sonorant final or sonorant in the final syllable; takes -tu	kavar "to seize" kuri "to aim/intend"	kavardu kuridu	kavarva kuriva	N/A
Class II	IIa	Long root vowel with no final consonant	kā "to protect" ō "to love" sō "to drive away"	kādu ōtu (exceptional; see VI) sōdu	kāva ōva sōva	kāyal (inf.) sōval (inf.)
Class II	IIb	Final -i/e and takes -du without the -i augment; in the 3rd person neuter, the past sign is dropped	aṟi "to know/understand" tiḷi "to be clear/know"	aṟidu tiḷidu	aṟiva tiḷiva	N/A
Class III	IIIa	Monosyllabic, short root vowel, sonorant final (kal may be exceptional here)	kal "to learn" uṇ "to dine/eat"	kaltu uṇḍu	kalva uṇba	kalal (inf.)/kalladu (neg. part.) uṇal (inf.)/uṇṇadu
Class III	IIIb	Monosyllabic, short root vowel, -y final	gey "to do"	geydu	geyva	geyyal
Class III	IIIc	Monosyllabic, short root vowel, -ḷ final	koḷ "to take"	koṇḍu	koḷva	koḷal (inf.) /koḷḷadu (neg. part.)
Class III		Monosyllabic, short root vowel, -l final	kol "to kill" sal "to be current/allowed" (note: sal is sometimes listed as sāl)	kondu sandu	kolva salva	kolal (inf.)/kolladu (neg. part.) salal (inf.) /salladu (neg. part.)
Class III	IIId	Monosyllabic, short root vowel, -n final	tin "to eat"	tindu	timba	tinal (inf.)/tinnadu (neg. part.)
Class IV	IVa	Disyllabic with long root vowel, geminate, or cluster before final -u; past participle takes -du	kūḍu "to meet"	kūḍidu	kūḍuva	N/A
Class IV	IVb	Long, low root vowel with -ḍu as final syllable or -ṟu as the final	nōḍu "to see" tōṟu "to do" (note: tōṟu is sometimes listed as tōṟ)	nōḍidu tōṟidu	nōḻva/nōḻpa tōṟva/tōṟpa	N/A
Class IV	IVc	Trisyllabic with -gu as the final syllable	toḷagu "to shine" misugu "to glitter"	toḷagidu misugidu	toḷaguva/toḷap(pa) misuguva/misup(pa)	N/A
Class V	Va	Short root vowel with -gu, -ḍu, -ṟu, or -su as the final syllable; past participle ending becomes -kku, -ṭṭu, -ttu, and -ccu respectively	nagu "to laugh" biḍu "to release/leave" peṟu "to give birth" (note: sometimes appears as peṟ) pasu "to spread"	nakku biṭṭu petta paccu	naguva biḍuva peṟuva pasuva	N/A
Class V	Vb	Short root vowels (other than e or o) with -gu, -ḍu, -ṟu, or -su as the final syllable; stem vowel changes in past tense: i-> e, u->o	kiḍu "to be ruined/spoiled" isu "to shoot (as an arrow)" pugu "to enter" giṟu "to think/take to be" (note: sometimes appears as giṟ)	keṭṭu eccu pokku gettu	kiḍuva isuva puguva giṟuva	N/A
Class V	Vc	The verb bisuḍu	bisuḍu "to throw"	bisuṭu	bisuḻpa	bisuḻkema (opt.)
Class VI	VIa	Long root vowel with -ḻ and -ṇ finals; past participle shortens root vowel before -du	ēḻ "to rise/get up" kāṇ "to see/be seen"	eḻdu kaṇḍu	ēḻva kāṇba	N/A
Class VI	VIb	The verb kīḻ	kīḻ "to pluck"	kiḻtu	kīḻva	kiḻal (inf.)
Class VI	VIc	Long vowel with unmarked y glide in some non-finite forms; past participle shortens the final vowel and glide becomes t before du. Includes nasal variants	sā "to die" ī "to give/grant" bē "to be burnt up/cooked") mī "to bathe	sattu ittu bendu mindu	sāva īva bēva mīva	sāyal (inf.) īyal (inf.) bēyal (inf.) mīyal (inf.)
Class VII		-n/ṟ-finals roots alternate with m/r before present marker	ān "to meet with/oppose/lean against/endure" āṟ "to be able"	āntu ārtu	āmpa ārpa	N/A
Class VIII	a	Irregular roots taru, baru, and āṭar; past participle takes a nasal with -du	baru "to come" taru "to bring" āṭar "to fall upon"	bandu tandu āṭandu	barpa tarpa āṭarpa	baral (inf.); bā (imp.)/banni (imp. pl.) taral (inf.); tā (imp.)/tanni (imp. pl.) āṭaral (inf.)
Class VIII	b	Irregular roots pōgu and āgu; past participle forms with -du but replaces -gu with -yi in the 3rd person neuter, and the converb forms with -gi	pōgu āgu	pōdu/pōyi ādu/āyi	pōpa appa	pōgal (inf.); pōke (opt.) āgal (inf.); akke (opt.)

==== Pronominal Endings ====
			Past	Present-Future	Compound Present-Future	Negative
1st person	singular		ᴩꜱᴛ-en	ꜰᴜᴛ-eṁ ꜰᴜᴛ-en	ᴩꜱᴛ-ap-en	ʙᴀꜱᴇ-en
1st person	plural		ᴩꜱᴛ-em ᴩꜱᴛ-evu	ꜰᴜᴛ-em ꜰᴜᴛ-evu	ᴩꜱᴛ-ap-em ᴩꜱᴛ-ap-evu	ʙᴀꜱᴇ-em ʙᴀꜱᴇ-evu
2nd person	singular		ᴩꜱᴛ-ay	ꜰᴜᴛ-ay	ᴩꜱᴛ-ap-ay	ʙᴀꜱᴇ-ay
2nd person	plural		ᴩꜱᴛ-ir	ꜰᴜᴛ-ir	ᴩꜱᴛ-ap-ir	ʙᴀꜱᴇ-ir
3rd person	singular	masculine	ᴩꜱᴛ-an	ꜰᴜᴛ-an	ᴩꜱᴛ-ap-aṁ ᴩꜱᴛ-ap-an	ʙᴀꜱᴇ-aṁ ʙᴀꜱᴇ-an
3rd person	singular	feminine	ᴩꜱᴛ-aḷ	ꜰᴜᴛ-aḷ	ᴩꜱᴛ-ap-aḷ	ʙᴀꜱᴇ-aḷ
3rd person	singular	neuter	ᴩꜱᴛ-udu (standard) ᴩꜱᴛ-itu (later)	ꜰᴜᴛ-udu	ᴩꜱᴛ-ap-udu	ʙᴀꜱᴇ-adu
3rd person	plural	human	ᴩꜱᴛ-ar	ꜰᴜᴛ-ar	ᴩꜱᴛ-ap-ar	ʙᴀꜱᴇ-ar
3rd person	plural	non-human	ᴩꜱᴛ-uvu	ꜰᴜᴛ-uvu	ᴩꜱᴛ-ap-uvu	ʙᴀꜱᴇ-avu

Though Kēśirāja was widely considered the authority on classical Kannada, some of the forms he teaches were superseded or developed alternatives. For example, the pronominal ending -evu marking the first person singular could also be pronounced -em. This is because the euphonic addition of the -u causes -m to be pronounced -v. Similarly, Kēśirāja teaches that the present tense (described in the table above) is marked by the ending -dapa, and the future tense with the ending -va. The -dapa ending is a compound tense marker that combines the past tense stem and an auxiliary form of the verb al or āgu (al + va -> appa -> apa, or āgu (ak-) + va -> appa -> apa, depending on how it is analyzed), followed by the personal endings).

==== Additional Verb Forms ====
In Old Kannada, the finite negative is the standard form of negation, marked by the mood sign -a (ex. nān pōgen "I will not go"). Its adjectival participle is formed with -ada (ex. māḍada "that which will not be done") and the adverbial participle is formed with -ade (ex. koḷḷade, "without having taken"). While Kēśirāja teaches that the finite negative is used in all tenses, it is frequently used in the sense of the present-future and often with connotation of refusal or inability.

Causative verbs could be derived from verb roots with the suffixes -(i)cu, -(i)su, and -(i)pu (the latter is the least productive, and -(i)su eventually becomes the dominant causative suffix). The causative -(i)su also derives denominative verbs from Sanskrit and (less commonly) Kannada nouns. For example, pāṭhisu ("to recite") is derived from the Sanskrit noun pāṭha ("recitation"). Sanskrit verb roots are formally proscribed from being receiving this suffix, but verbs like bhajisu from bhaj ("to participate/worship") do exist.

In addition to the finite verb forms marked with pronominal endings, the ending -kum/gum serves as a conjugated verb for all tenses, numbers and grammatical persons. When this ending is used with a verb marked by -isu, its -su ending is dropped and replaced by -kkum. A morphologically related form is the optative -ke/ge (ex. māḻke "may it be done").

Unlike modern Kannada, the conditional form (the "if-clause") could be formed with either the present-future or past stem (ex. kēḷvoḍe "if one listens"), kēḷdoḍe ("if one listened"). The conditional ending is -oḍe, which would later be pronounced -aḍe in Middle Kannada.

A ubiquitous feature of Old Kannada was the use of the infinitive in the sense of the Sanskrit sati-saptami (locative absolute). The ending -e could be attached to any verb, and served to mark a separate clause from that of the main verb. Kēśirāja also proscribes the use of the infinitive ending -al in this sense, though it does become more common in later literature. Other verbal endings like -inegam and -annegam served a similar function, marking the limit or extent at which the action was performed (i.e. "until"). In this sense, -inegam and -annegam (and their variants, -inam and -annam) were used with verbs in the present and future tense, whereas the endings -udum and -aloḍam were used with the past tense.

Appellative verbs also existed, which were nouns used as verbs by suffixing personal terminations, e.g. ಅರಸನ್ (king) + ಎನ್ (personal termination for 'I') = ಅರಸನೆನ್ (I am the king). According to Kēśirāja, the nominative case markers -n (singular) and -r/gaḷ (plural) could be added optionally before the appellatives -en (1st person singular) and -em/evu (1st person plural). This usage outside the 3rd person became increasingly rare into the medieval period.

== Epigraphy and literature ==
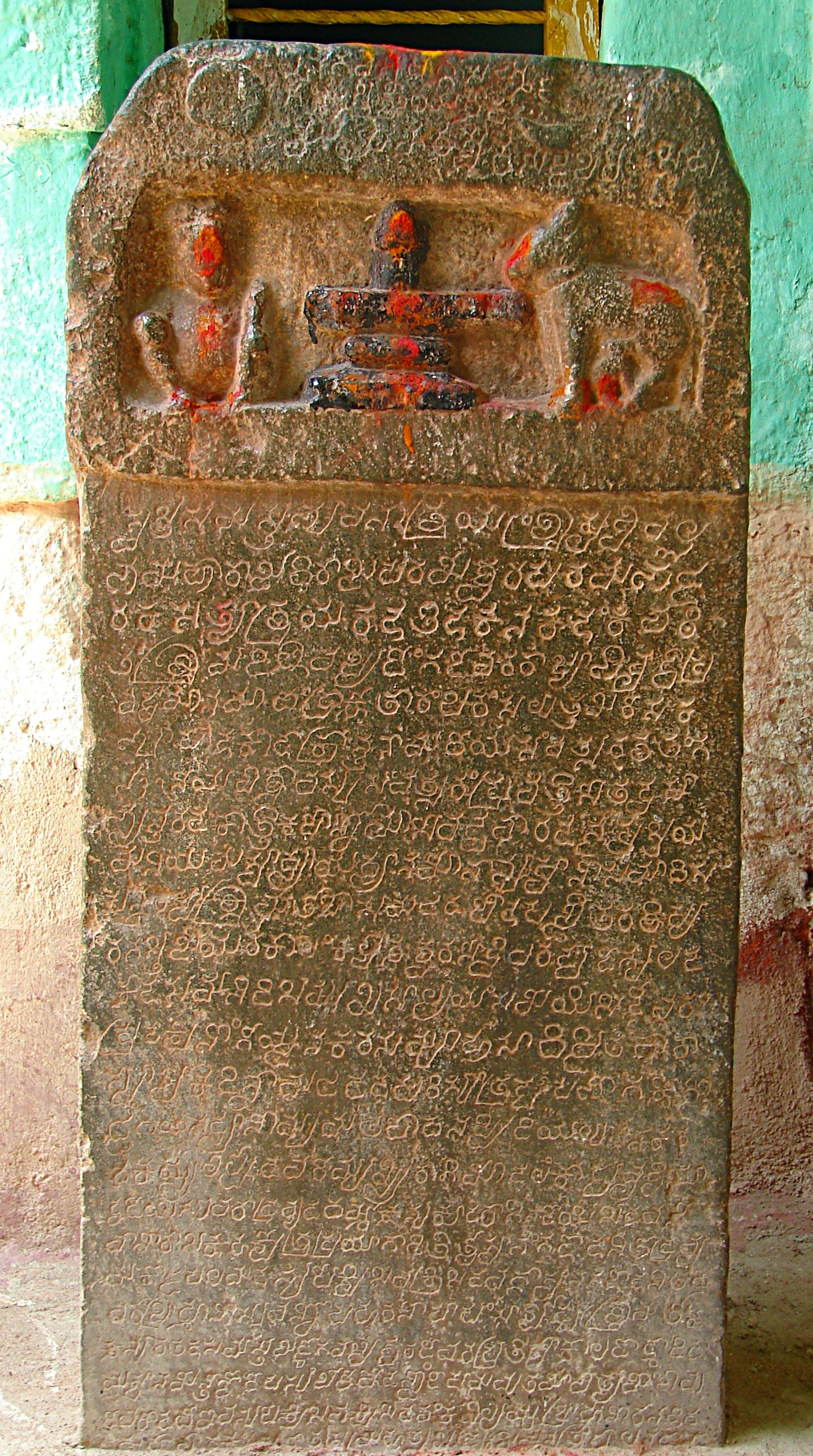
9th century old Kannada inscription of Rashtrakutas at Navalinga temple in Kuknur, Karnataka

Kannada's epigraphical record is vast, including more than 800 inscriptions found at Shravanabelagola dating from various points between 600 and 1830 CE. A large number of these are found at Chandragiri, and the rest can be seen at Indragiri. The inscriptions include text in the Kannada, Sanskrit, Tamil, Marathi, Marwari and Mahajani languages. The second volume of Epigraphia Carnatica, written by Benjamin L. Rice is dedicated to the inscriptions found here. The inscriptions that are scattered around the area of Shravanabelagola are in various Halegannada (Old Kannada) and Purvadahalegannada (Pre-Old Kannada) characters. Some of these inscriptions mention the rise to power of the Gangas, Rashtrakutas, Hoysalas, Vijayanagar Empire and Mysore Wodeyars. These inscriptions have played an important role in modern scholarship's understanding of the nature, growth and development of the Kannada language and its literature.

Epigraphia Carnatica by B.L.Rice published by the Mysore Archeology department in 12 volumes contains a study of inscriptions from 3rd century until the 19th century. These inscriptions belonged to different dynasties that ruled this region such as Kadambas, Western Chalukyas, Hoysalas, Vijayanagar kings, Hyder Ali and his son Tipu Sultan and the Wadiyars. The inscriptions found were mainly written in Kannada language but some have been found to be written in languages like Tamil, Sanskrit, Telugu, Urdu and even Persian and have been preserved digitally as a CD-ROM in 2005.

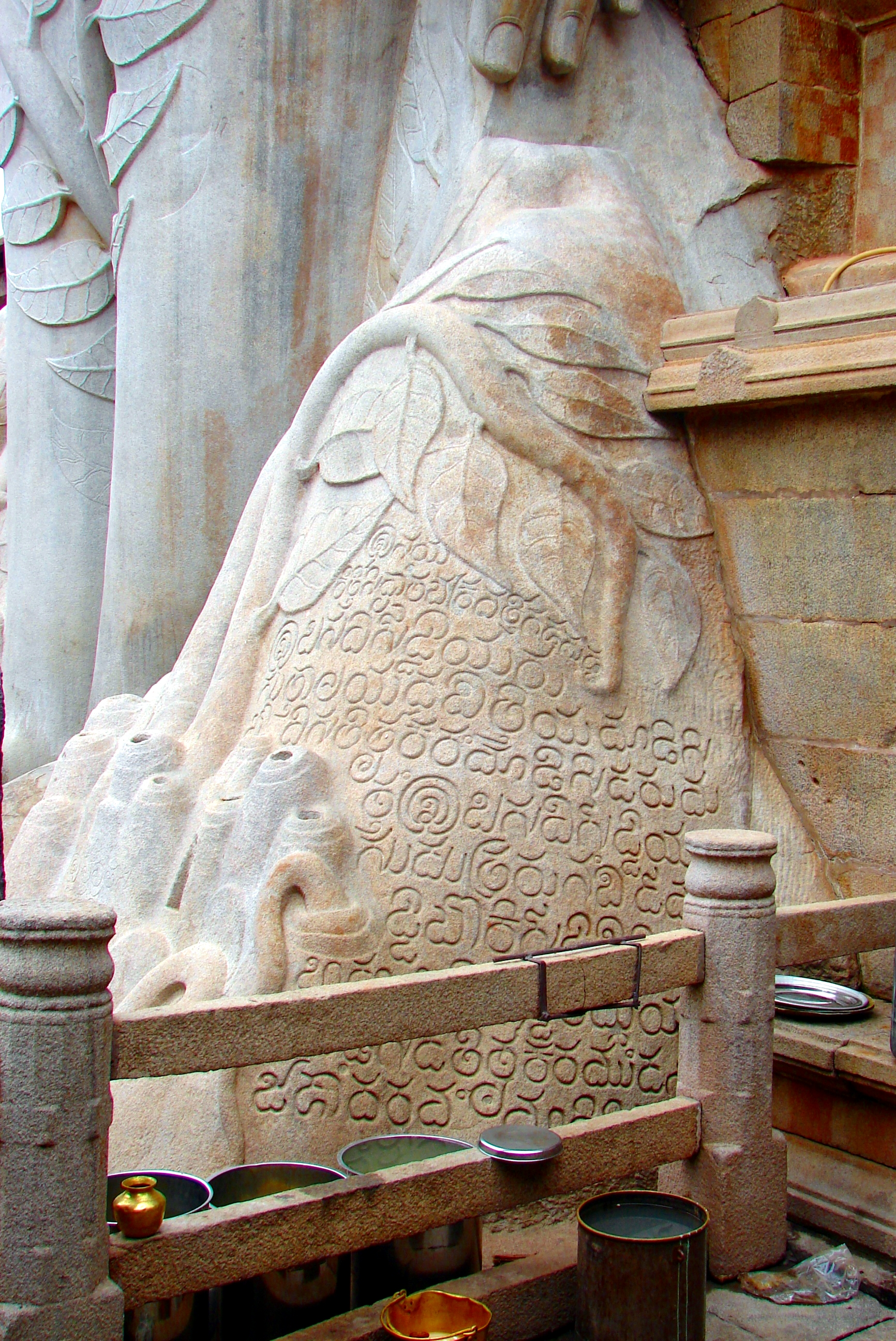
Old Kannada inscription at the base of Gomateshwara monolith in Shravanabelagola (981 CE. Western Ganga Dynasty)

The earliest full-length Kannada copper plates in Old Kannada script (early 8th century) belongs to the Alupa King Aluvarasa II from Belmannu, South Kanara district and displays the double crested fish, his royal emblem. The oldest well-preserved palm leaf manuscript is in Old Kannada and is that of Dhavala, dated to around the 9th century, preserved in the Jain Bhandar, Mudbidri, Dakshina Kannada district. The manuscript contains 1478 leaves written using ink.

Scholars typically divide Kannada literature according the phases of its linguistic development: "Old Kannada" (8th-13th century CE), "Middle Kannada" (14th century CE-18th century CE), and "Modern Kannada" (19th century CE-present). However, this classification applies mostly to literary works and not to the devotional corpora (such as the vacanas and folk literature), which often display new characteristics earlier. Courtly writing in Kannada also frequently preserved the language of Kēśirāja's Śabdamaṇidarpaṇa (12th century CE), with many latter-day court poets consciously emulating it as late as the 18th century CE.

The earliest Kannada literature, starting in the 8th century CE, was produced predominantly in the courts of Jain rulers. In these circles, poets like Pampa, Ponna and Ranna, lauded in modern Karantaka as the ratnatraya ("triple gems") of early Kannada literature, composed both secular and religious literature, including the Pampa Bhārata, the Ādipurāṇa, the Śāntipurāṇa, and Sāhasabhīmavijaya.

The 11th century CE saw the emergence of Śaiva devotional poets known as the śaraṇas, who inaugurated a new genre of prose-like poetry known as the vacana sahitya. Due to popularity of these works, among other social changes taking place in the region, Śaiva rulers began to patronize works featuring Śaiva devotion. Harihara (13th century CE) is widely regarded as the inaugurator of the Śaiva hagiographic tradition in Kannada. Poets like Rāghavāṅka, Harihara's nephew (13th century CE), and Cāmarasa (15th century CE) are two famous representatives of this tradition. Ṣaḍakṣaradēva was a Vīraśaiva poet (17th century CE) famed for his equal mastery in Kannada and Sanskrit, earning him the title ubhayakavi ("a poet of [Kannada and Sanskrit]). Jain poets, such as Bandhuvarma (13th century CE) and Maṅgarasa (15th century CE), continued to write into the medieval period.

Early "Brahminical" or Vaiṣṇava works also emerged from the 11th century. The Haridāsas began to spread their own devotional works in the 13th-14th centuries CE. Following their institutionalization in courtly settings, Vaiṣṇava poets like Rudrabhaṭṭa, Kumāravyāsa, and Cauṇḍarasa (not to be confused with a Jain poet of the same name) emerged over the centuries. Stylistic variety greatly increased in the medieval period, ranging from the Sanskritic forms such as the campū to the vernacular Kannada forms like the ṣaṭpadi and ragaḷe. Kumāravyāsa's Gadugina Bhārata (also known as the Kumāravyāsa Bhārata or Karṇāṭaka Bhāratakathāmañjari) is particularly famous for popularizing Middle Kannada as a legitimate literary idiom.

== Classical language ==
In 2008, Kannada was recognised as a Classical language of India by the Central Institute of Indian Languages. Their decision was based on fulfillment of four criteria:

- High antiquity of its early texts/recorded history over a period of 1500-2000 years.
- body of ancient literature/texts, which is considered a valuable heritage by generations of speakers.
- The literary tradition be original and not borrowed from another speech community.
- The classical language and literature being distinct from modern, there may also be a discontinuity between the classical language and its later forms or its offshoots.

== Changes in Middle Kannada ==
Middle Kannada (naḍugannaḍa) is a later phase of Old Kannada. It is generally identified by shifts in pronunciation and grammatical usage. These include the debuccalization of ಪ ⟨p⟩ to ಹ ⟨h⟩ (eg. ಬನ್ದಪೆನ್ bandapen “I come” > ಬನ್ದಹೆನ್ bandahen). The insertion of the epenthetic vowel ⟨u⟩ to the ends of consonant-final words and between consonant clusters also becomes prevalent. In the Śabdamaṇidarpaṇa, Kēśirāja notes that the change of ಪ ⟨p⟩ to ಹ ⟨h⟩ occurs sometimes in native (dēśi) Kannada words. Middle Kannada generally sees greater case variation (vibhakti-pallaṭa), where various case functions are swapped for one another.

== See also ==
- Telugu-Kannada script
- Kadamba script
- Kannada language
- Kannada literature

== Sources ==
- Datta, Amaresh (1988), Encyclopaedia of Indian literature, vol. 2, Sahitya Akademi, ISBN 81-260-1194-7
- Gai, Govind Swamirao (1992), Studies in Indian History, Epigraphy, and Culture, Karnataka, India: Shrihari Prakashana
- Ramesh, K. V. (1984b). Indian Epigraphy. Sundeep.
1. The Expert Committee Report of the Government of Karnataka titled "Experts Report submitted to the Government of Karnataka on the subject of the recognition of Kannada as a classical Language" published in February 2007 by Kannada Pustaka Pradhikara of The Department of Kannada and Culture, Government of Karnataka, M.S. Building, Bangalore.
2. Government of India Notification No 2-16-/2004-Akademics dated 31 October 2008.
