= Government Museum, Bengaluru =

Museum in Bengaluru, India

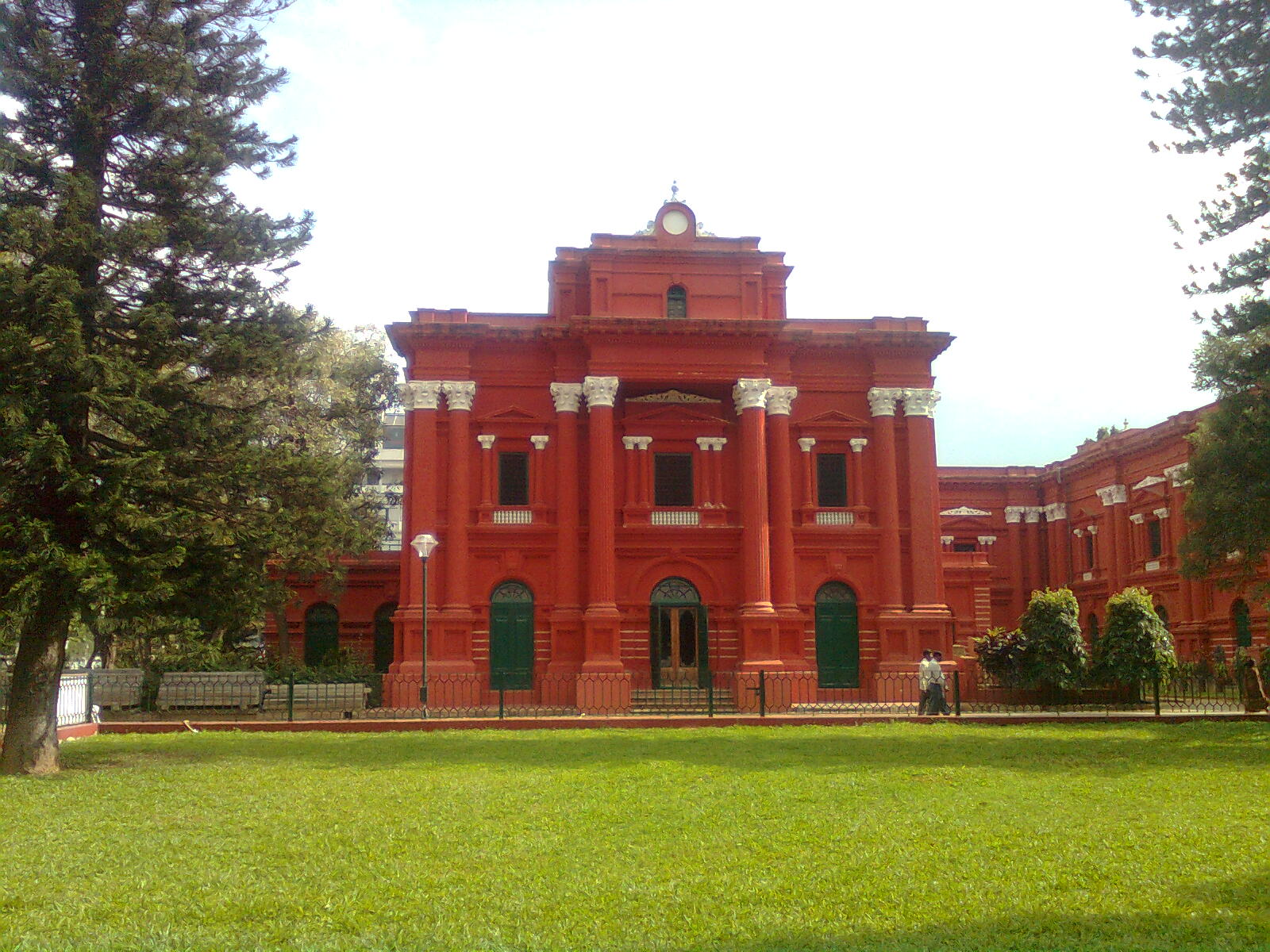
- Front façade of the museum
- Established: 18 August 1865
- Location: Kasturba Road, Bengaluru, India
- Coordinates: 12.9747°N 77.5958°E
- Key holdings: Halmidi inscription
- Collection size: Sculpture, old jewellery, coins and inscriptions.
- Visitors: 90,000 per annum

Government Museum, Bengaluru, established in 1865 by the Mysore State with the guidance of Surgeon Edward Balfour who founded the museum in Madras and supported by the Chief Commissioner of Mysore, L.B. Bowring, is one of the oldest museums in India and the second oldest museum in South India. It is now an archaeological museum and has a rare collection of archaeological and geological artifacts including old jewellery, sculpture, coins and inscriptions. The museum is also home to the Halmidi inscription, the earliest Kannada inscription (450 AD).

== History ==
=== Foundation ===
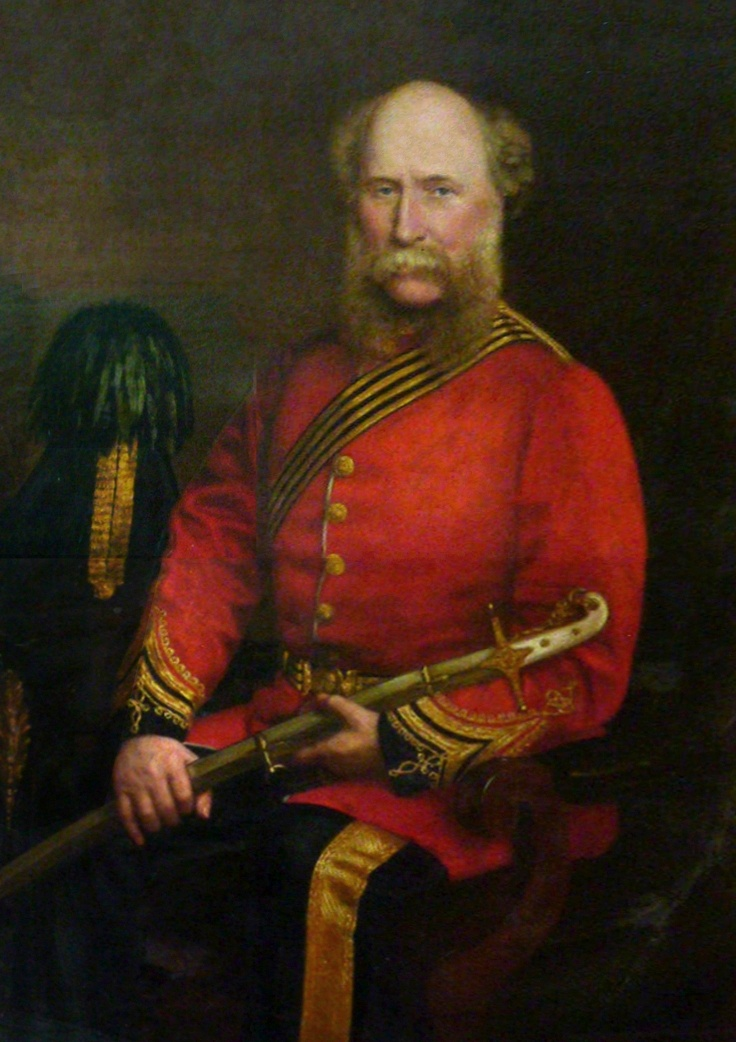
Portrait of Edward G. Balfour at the Madras Museum

The government museum in Bengaluru was established on 18 August 1865, during the period when L.B. Bowring was Chief Commissioner of Mysore State. A formal official notification was issued in the Mysore Government Gazette on 17 April 1866, a copy of which is still preserved in the Karnataka State Archives in Bengaluru. The gazette notification officially invited citizens to contribute cultural and natural artifacts to the museum for display.

The museum was founded at the advice and counsel of Edward G. Balfour, a medical officer of the Madras Army, transferred to Bengaluru from Madras. Balfour suggested setting up a museum similar to the museum he had previously established in Madras in 1851. Balfour had organized collections for the Great Exhibition of 1851. Balfour had a collection of zoological and natural specimens to exhibit in the Museum. The Government museum in Bangalore was then known as the Mysore Government Museum and the building opened in 1877 was located on what was then Sydney road (today Kasturba road).

=== First home ===
The museum was first established at the Cantonment's jail building. It continued to function there for 13 years until 1878.

=== New building ===
The jail building was considered not suitable for a museum and it was decided to construct a special museum building near the Cantonment. The current site of the museum was identified for the new museum. The new museum (the current structure) was planned and built in 1877 by Col. Richard Hieram Sankey, the Chief Engineer of Mysore State at that time.

The museum was popularly known as the tamasha house (entertainment house).

== Building ==
The museum is flanked by the Visvesvaraya Industrial And Technological Museum and the Venkatappa Art gallery. The museum is located centrally on Kasturba road. The museum is built in 1877 in the neoclassical architectural style. It has two porticos on either side, Corinthian columns, circular arches, sloping eaves and prominent sloping parapet walls.

== Collections ==
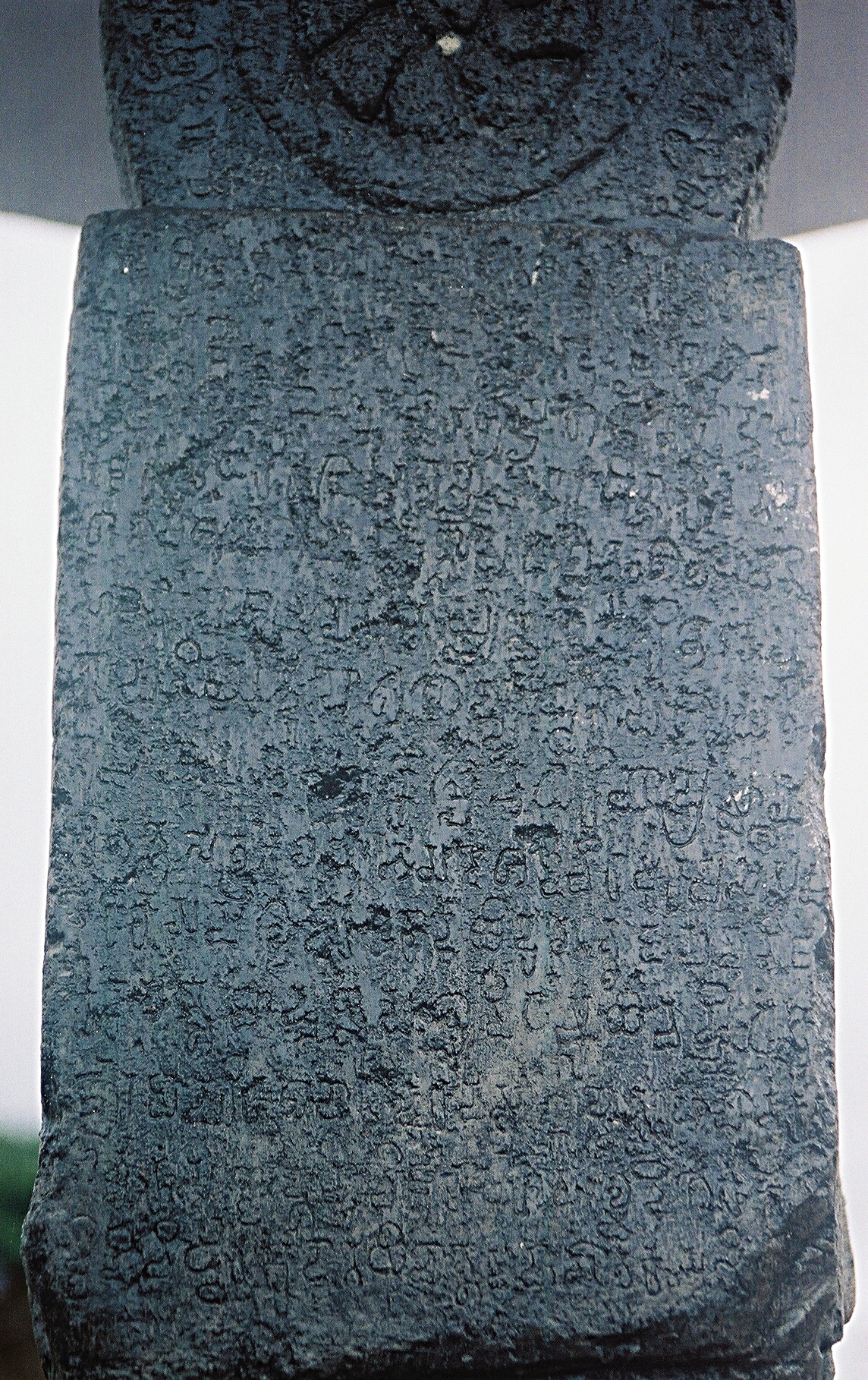
A replica of the original Halmidi inscription

The museum has two exhibition floors which are divided into 18 galleries. The galleries cover sections that span sculpture, natural history, geology, art, music and numismatics.

The museum is an archaeological museum and has a rare collection of archaeological and geological artifacts including old jewellery, sculpture, coins and inscriptions. The museum has 70 paintings, 84 sculptures, and hundreds of other artifacts, some of which unique to the museum. The museum has sculpture from the Hoysala, Gandhara and Nolamba periods.

Neolithic pottery from excavations carried out at Chandravalli, excavations artifacts from Mohenjodaro, Halebid and Vijayanagar, terracotta from Mathura and weapons from Kodagu. Many relics housed at the museum are as much as 5000 years old. The museum also houses rare paintings of Deccan, Mysore and Tanjore kingdoms are found.

The museum has a model of Srirangapatna, the fort of Tipu Sultan. There is a slab in the museum from Tipu's times that has 12 persian couplets. The museum also showcases various old musical instruments. A Tanjore style framework of 64 Nayanamars is a unique piece there.

The prized collections of the Museum include the earliest Kannada inscription- the Halmidi inscription (450 C.E.), Begur inscription (890 C.E.), Atakur inscription (949 C.E.) slabs are found in this museum.

== Visitors ==
The museum saw many visitors in the early part of its history. The average annual footfall was 280,000 in the 1870s and over 400,000 in the early part of the 20th century as per museum records catalogued by the British. According to museum officials, the annual number of visitors is over 90,000 consisting of domestic and international tourists.

The museum is temporarily closed to visitors for its renovation. It will stay closed for about a year according to some press reports.

== Governance ==
The Karnataka State Archaeology Department governs the museum. it comes under the purview of the Directorate of Archaeology and Museums. The 13th Finance Commission of India has sanctioned ₹ 1 billion as a grant to Karnataka for the conservation of monuments and development of museums.

== Gallery ==
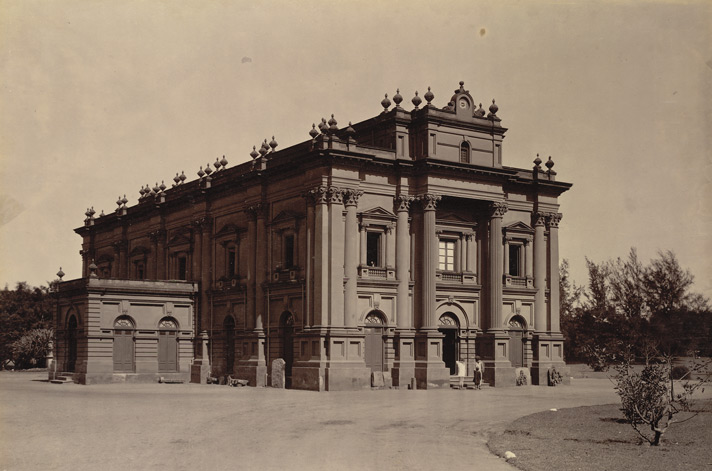
Government Museum, Bangalore (1890) from the Curzon Collection's 'Souvenir of Mysore Album'

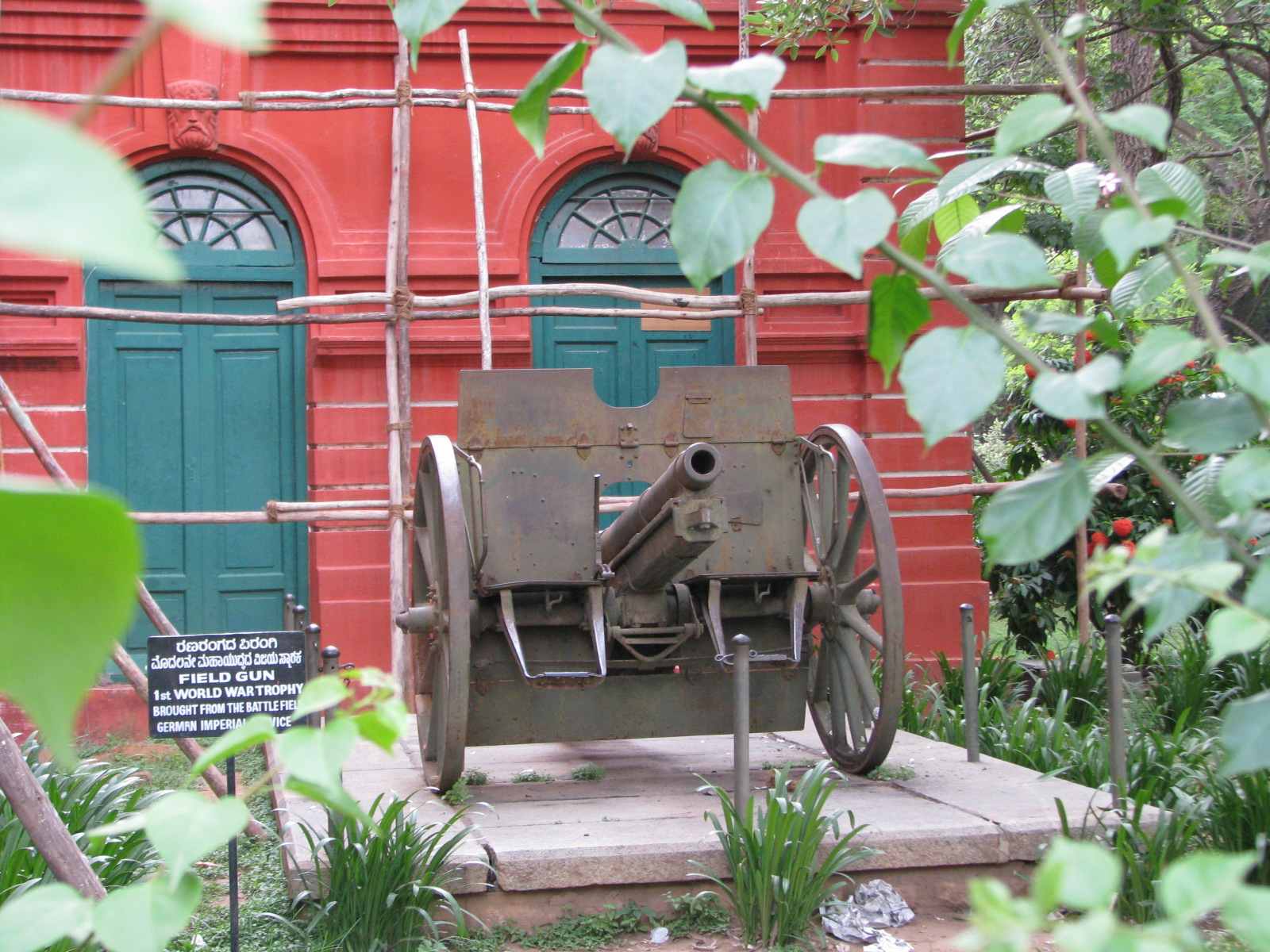
Field Gun, World War I Trophy, displayed outside the Government Museum

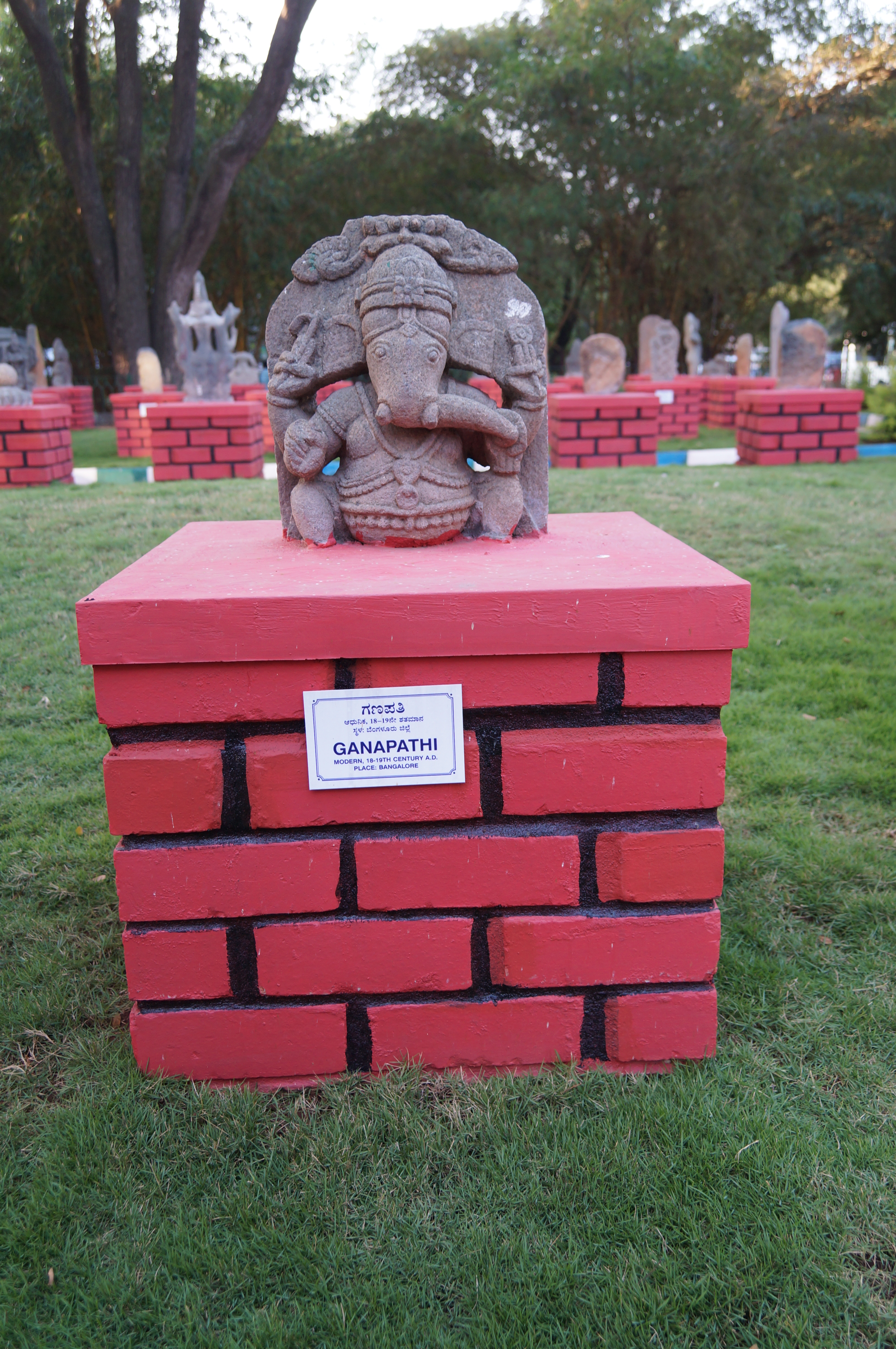
Ganapathi at Govt Museum Bangalore

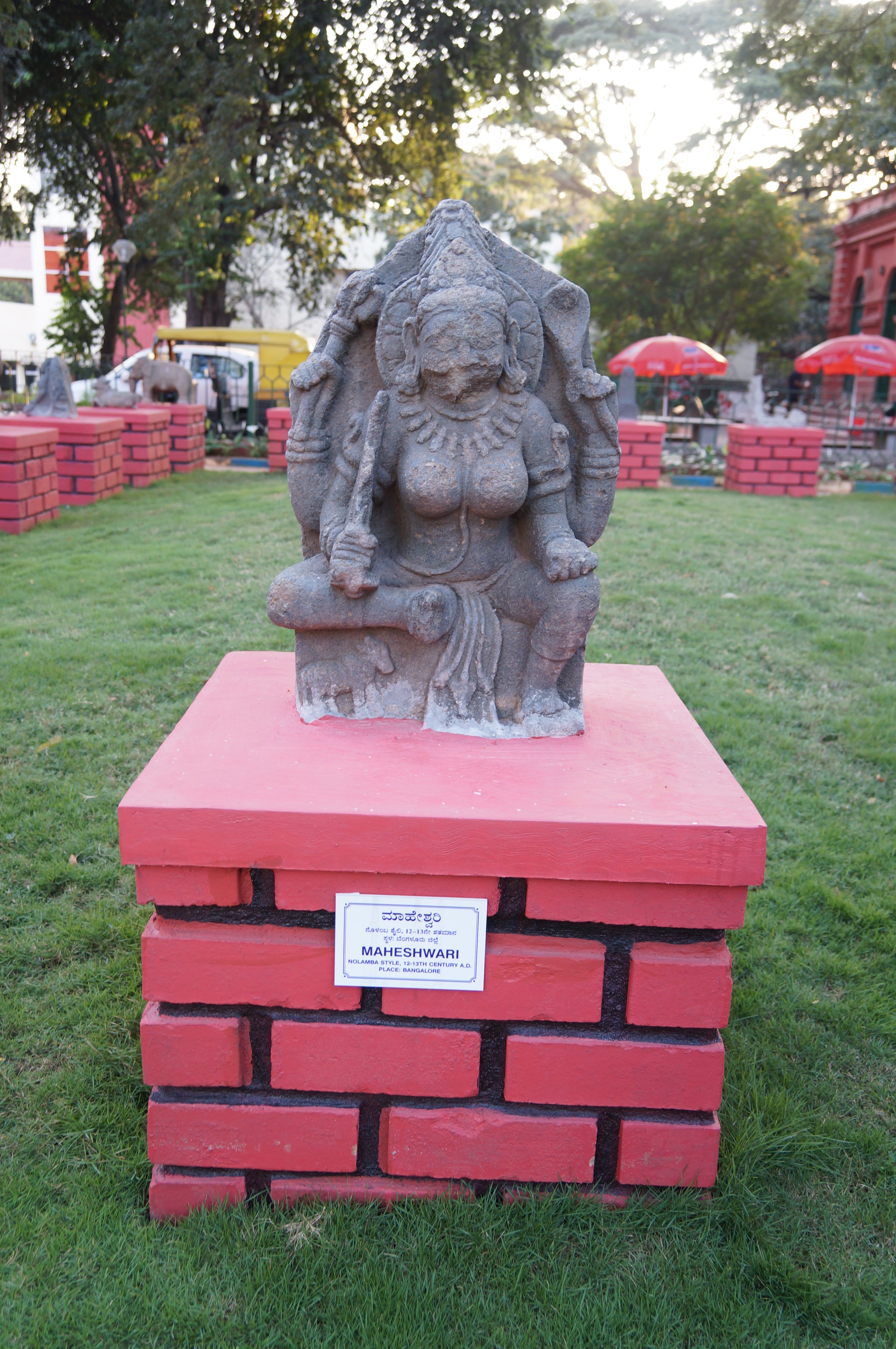
Maheshwari, a form of Feminine goddess at Govt Museum Bangalore

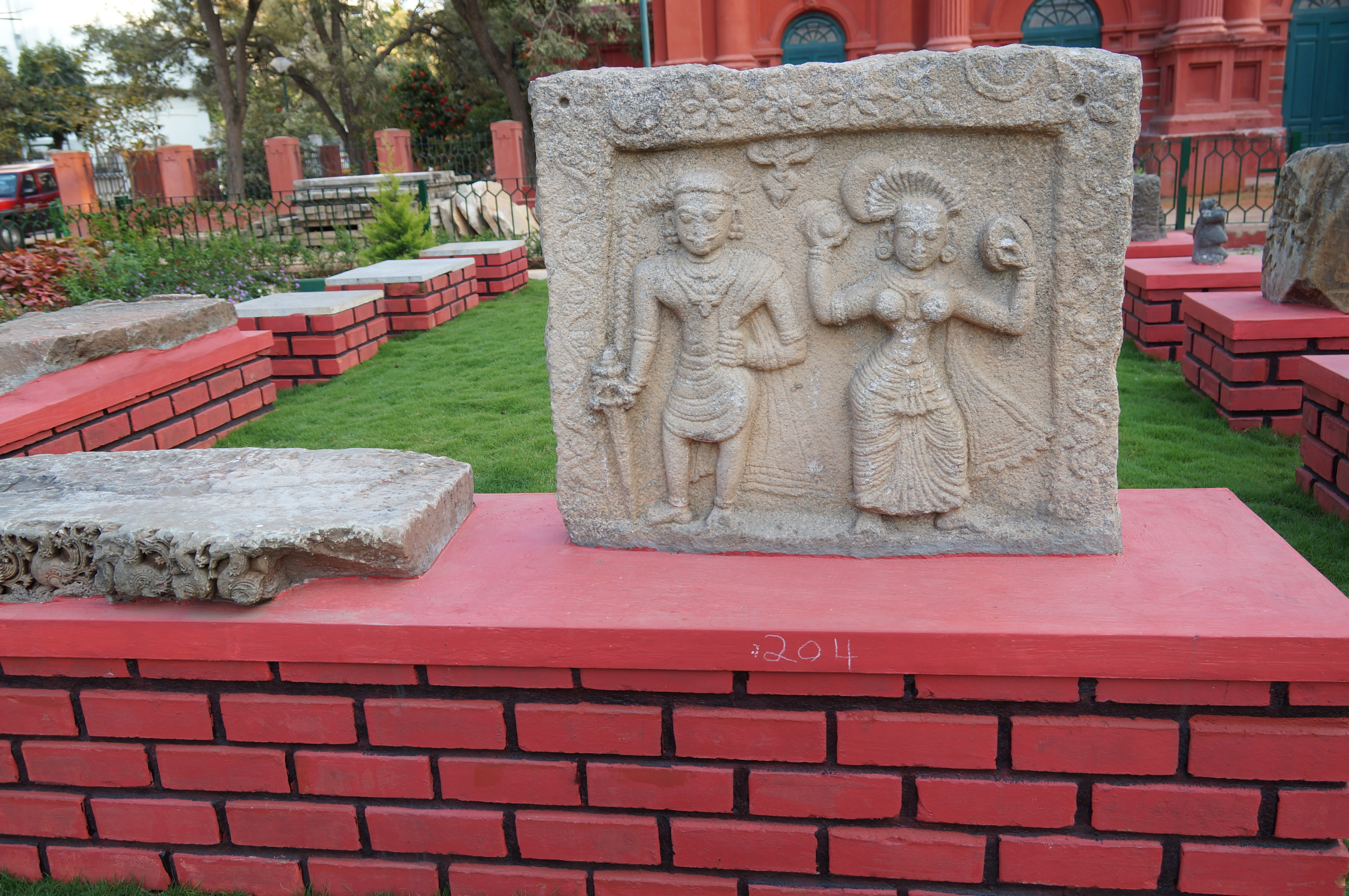
A man and a woman, village folks at Govt Museum Bangalore

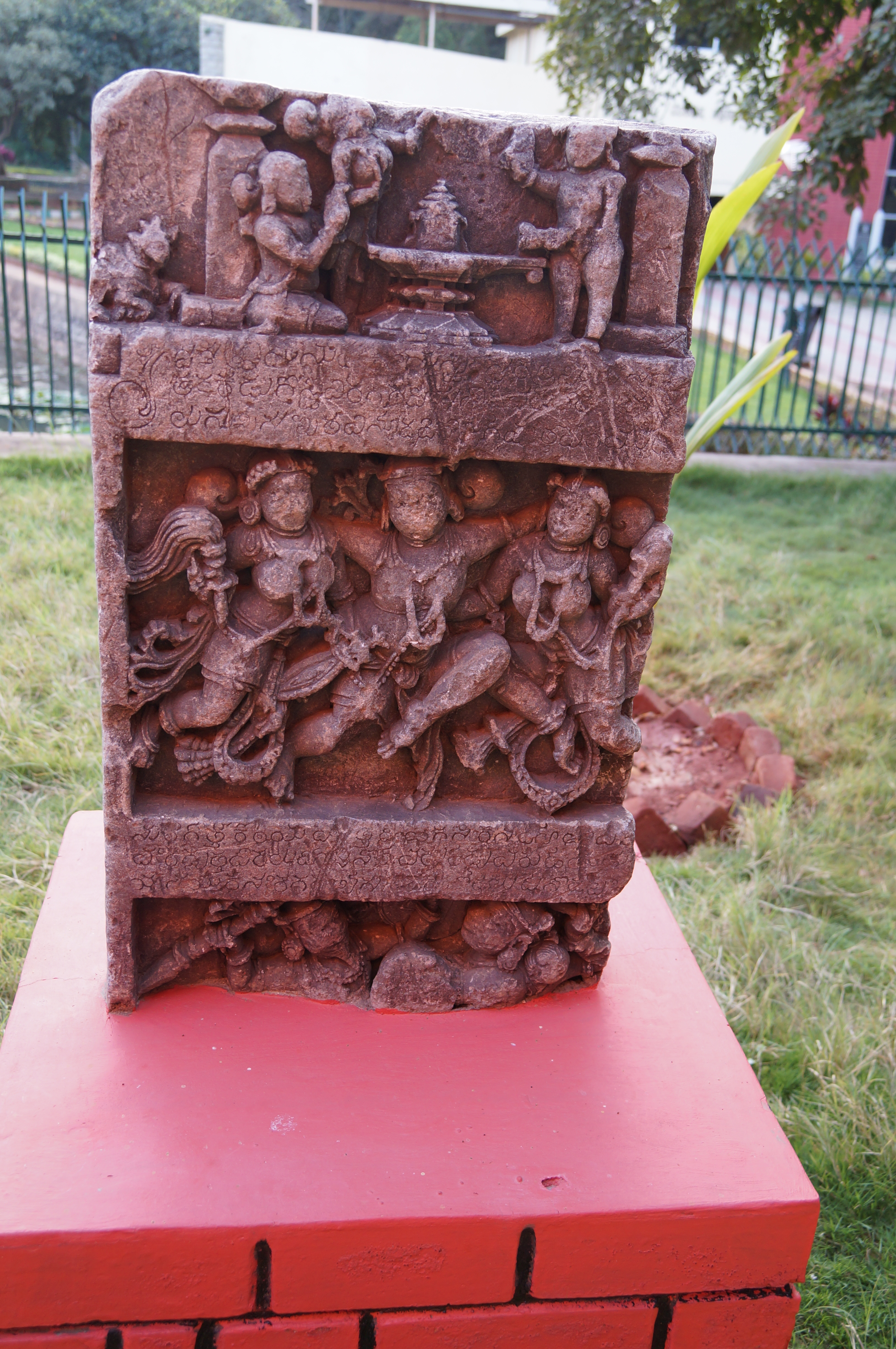
A three tiered hero stone memorial at the Government Museum, Bengaluru

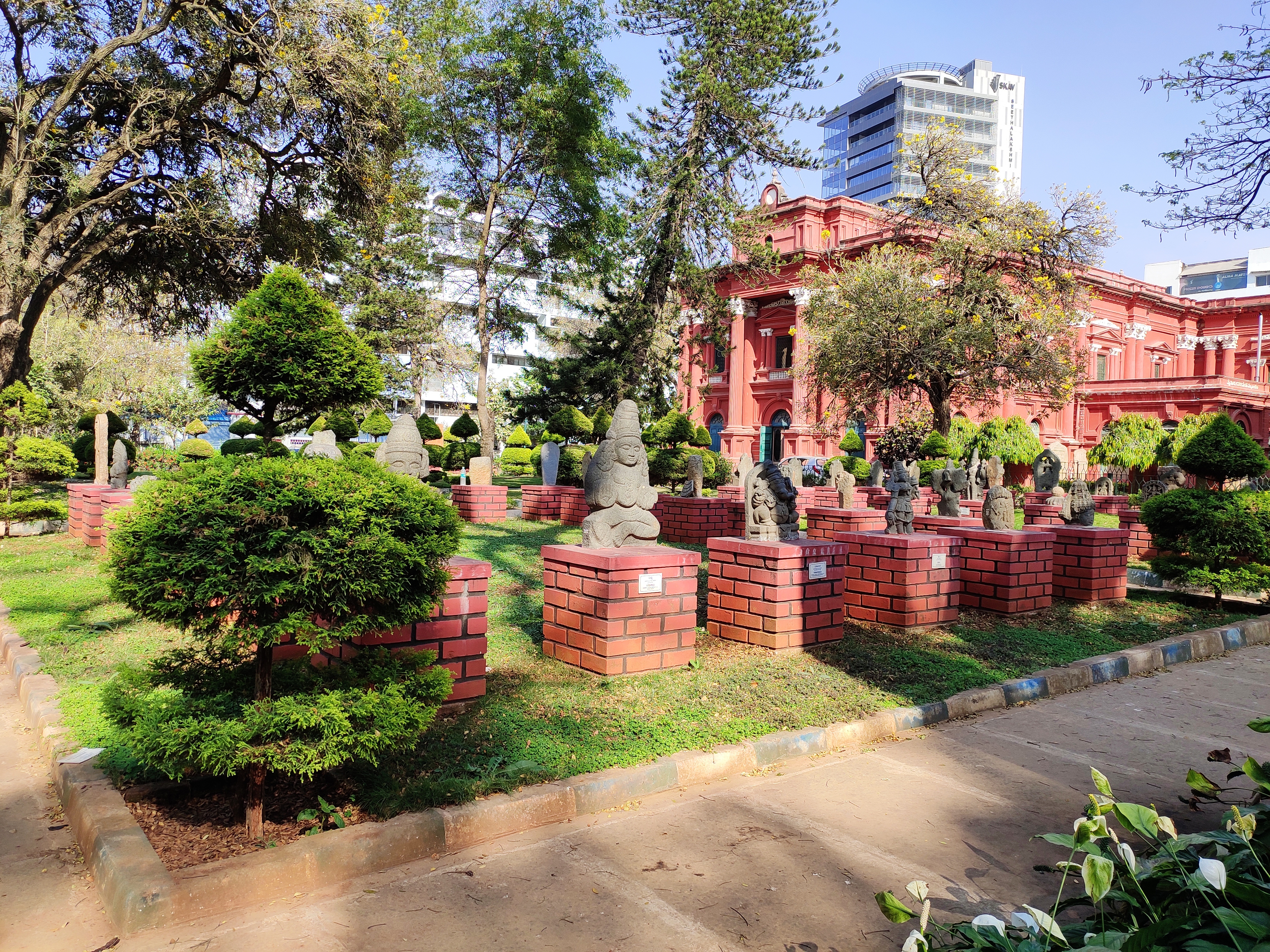
Sculptures in front of the Museum

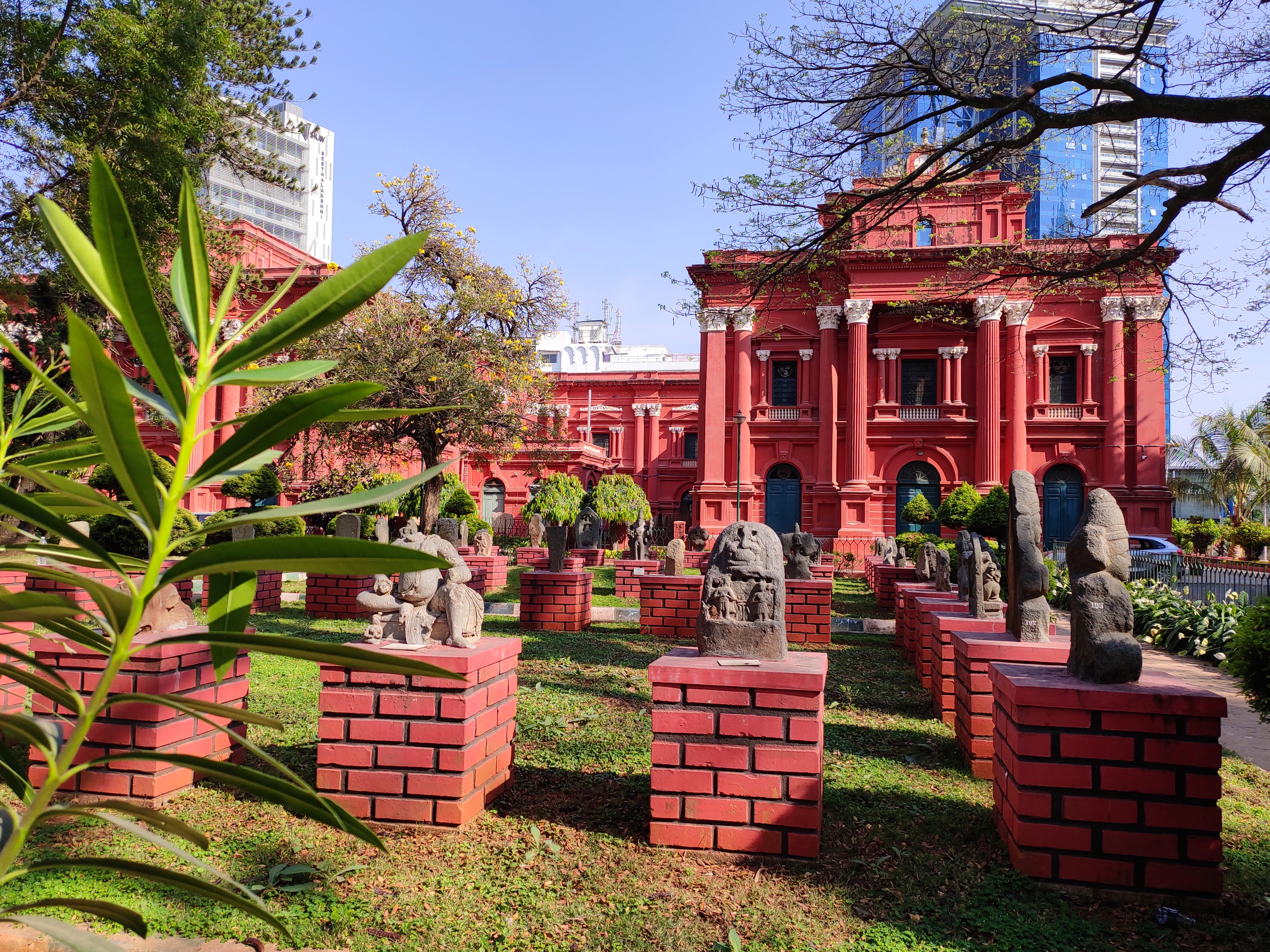
The museum in 2020

== See also ==
- List of museums in India
- List of tourist attractions in Bengaluru
- Cubbon Park
