= Shubhodaya controversy =

The Shubhodaya Controversy is related to the heated debates in India about a court case that happened in 1919 around a newspaper article in the Kannada language daily Shubhodaya. Under the title "Allama, Basava Vrittantavenu? (What is the Description of Allama and Basava, dated 18 April 1919), R. Shrinivasacharya wrote certain historical details which allegedly tarnished the image of Basavanna and Allama. This article triggered the wrath of the Lingayatas and resulted in Siddaramappa Pawate, a well known legal practitioner and a Lingayata scholar, suing Shrinivasacharya in the first grade Magistrate court of Dharwad.

The court case led to series of debates about the history of 12th century Shiva Sharanas and their contribution to Lingayata religion. The controversy was an important historical event for the Lingayatas who were provoked to rethink their image in the public sphere. The controversy threw open several questions related to Lingayata history, literature and philosophy. The Lingayatas had to assert their identity as a community and they accomplished it by actively participating in the debates and discussions. The controversy proved to be a guiding force for scholars like P. G. Halakatti to refashion Lingayata literature and history. This controversy was one of the turning points for re-imagining the Lingayata history and community in colonial Karnataka.
