= Halmidi =

- town
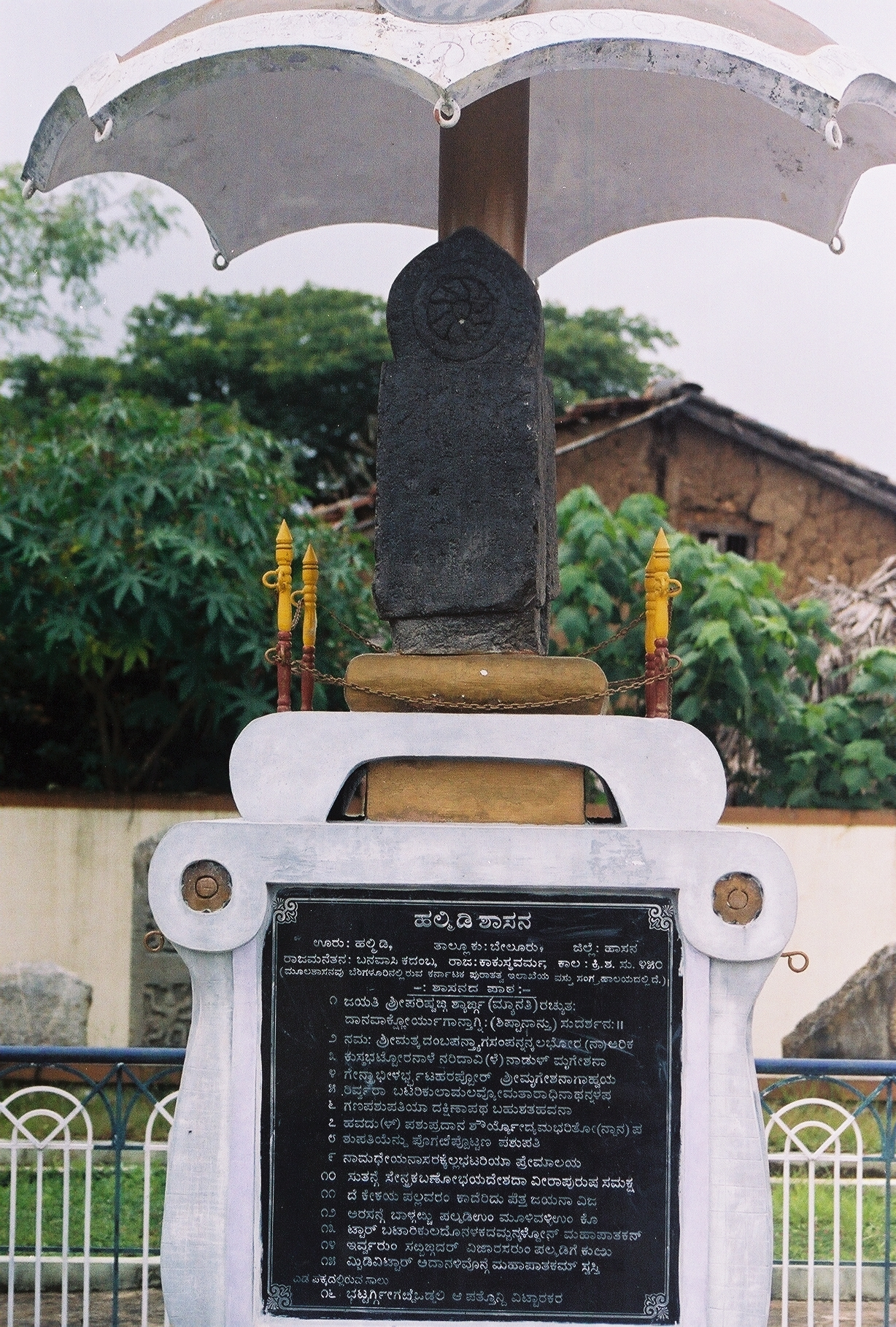
- Halmidi Inscription replica mounted on a pedestal

- Location in Karnataka, India
- Coordinates: 13.244833°N 75.820683°E
- Country: India
- State: Karnataka

Languages
  - Official: Kannada
- Time zone: UTC+5:30 (IST)
- ISO 3166 code: IN-KA
- Vehicle registration: KA
- Website: karnataka.gov.in

Halmidi is a small village in the Hassan district of Karnataka state, India, near the temple town of Belur. Halmidi is best known as the place where the oldest known inscription exclusively in Kannada language, the Halmidi inscription, was discovered. Anterior to this, many inscriptions with Kannada words have been discovered, such as Brahmagiri edict of 230 BCE of Emperor Ashoka. However, this is the first full-length inscription in Kannada. This inscription is generally known as the Halmidi inscription and consists of sixteen lines carved on a sandstone slab. It has been dated to 450 CE and demonstrates that Kannada was used as a language of administration at that time. The inscription is in primitive Kannada with distinctive characteristics attributed to those of Proto-Kannada and uses Kannada script similar to Brahmi characters.

Halmidi village is located between Chikmagalur city and Belur town. In recognition of the cultural importance of the inscription, and the role played by the village of Halmidi in its preservation, the Government of Karnataka has spent ₹25 lakh on developing infrastructural facilities in the village, and on building a mantapa to house a fibreglass replica of the original inscription. The Government has also begun to promote the village as a place of historical interest.

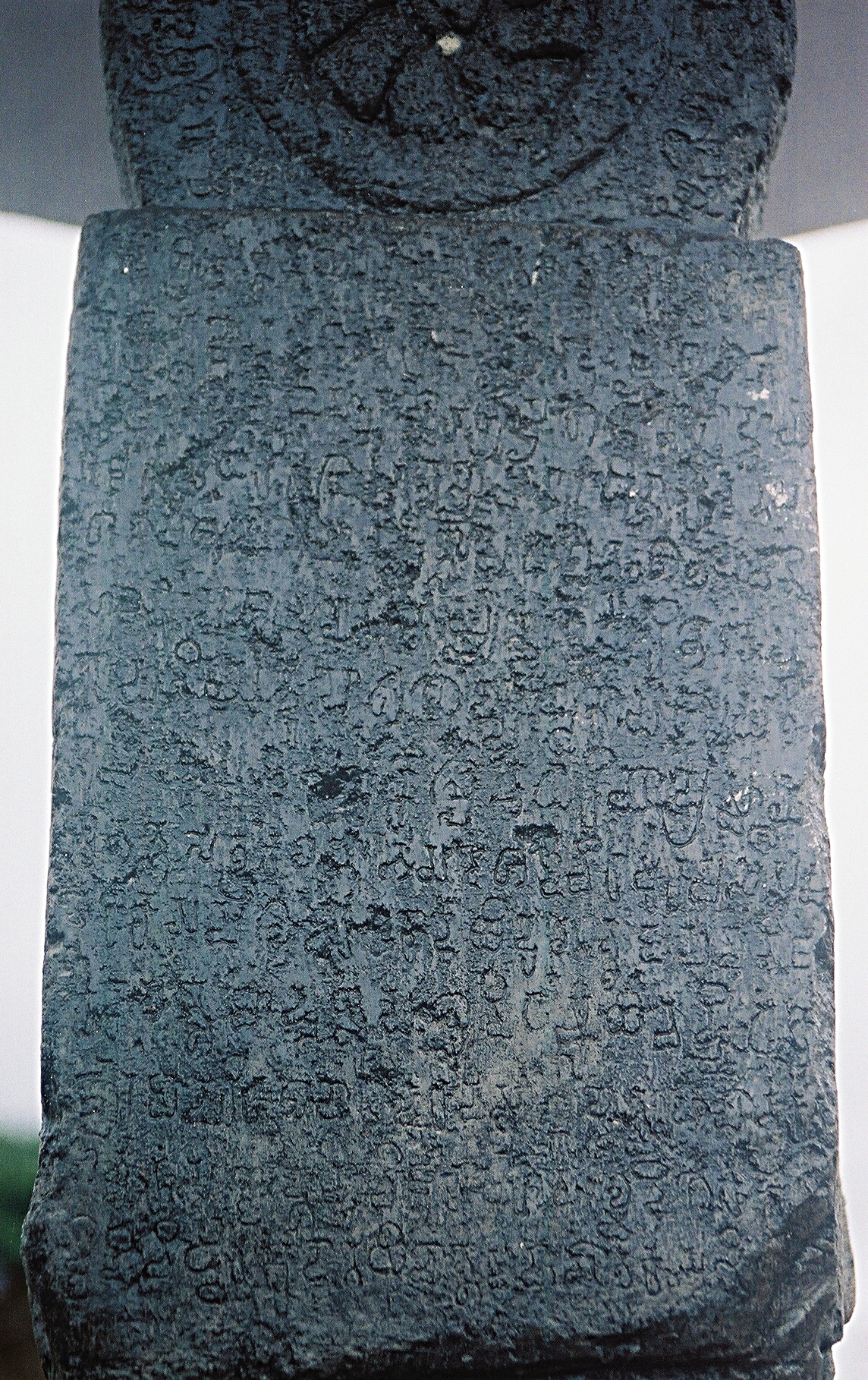
A replica of the Halmidi inscription dated 450 CE. It is the oldest known full-length Kannada language inscription in old Kannada script.

== See also ==
- Halmidi inscription
