= Shiva Sharanas =

Shiva Sharanas are devotees of Shiva and can refer specifically to the 12th century Shaiva poets known as vachanakaras.

== Etymology ==
Sharana is somebody who has surrendered oneself to the will of the Lord. Sharanu is derived from this term and it denotes the action of surrendering to or an act of respecting others.

== Vachanakaras ==
This term is seen in many Vachanas composed by the Vachanakaras namely Basavanna, Allama Prabhu, Akka Mahadevi and Madivala Machideva. The Vachanakaras, surrendering themselves to the will of Lord Shiva, have glorified and praised the forms of Lord Shiva. Not only this, the term signifies profound philosophical meanings.

A sharana is given a prime place in the schematic world of Vachanas. An example for elevated position of a sharana is the following vachana of Basavanna.

Look you, the sarana's sleep is telling of beads; It's Sivaratri when he wakes and sits; Wherever he treads is holy ground; As Siva doctrine whatever he speaks; The body of Kudala Sanga's Sarana Is very abode of Siva!

== See also ==
- Shubhodaya controversy
