= Halmidi inscription =

Oldest known Kadamba Kannada inscription

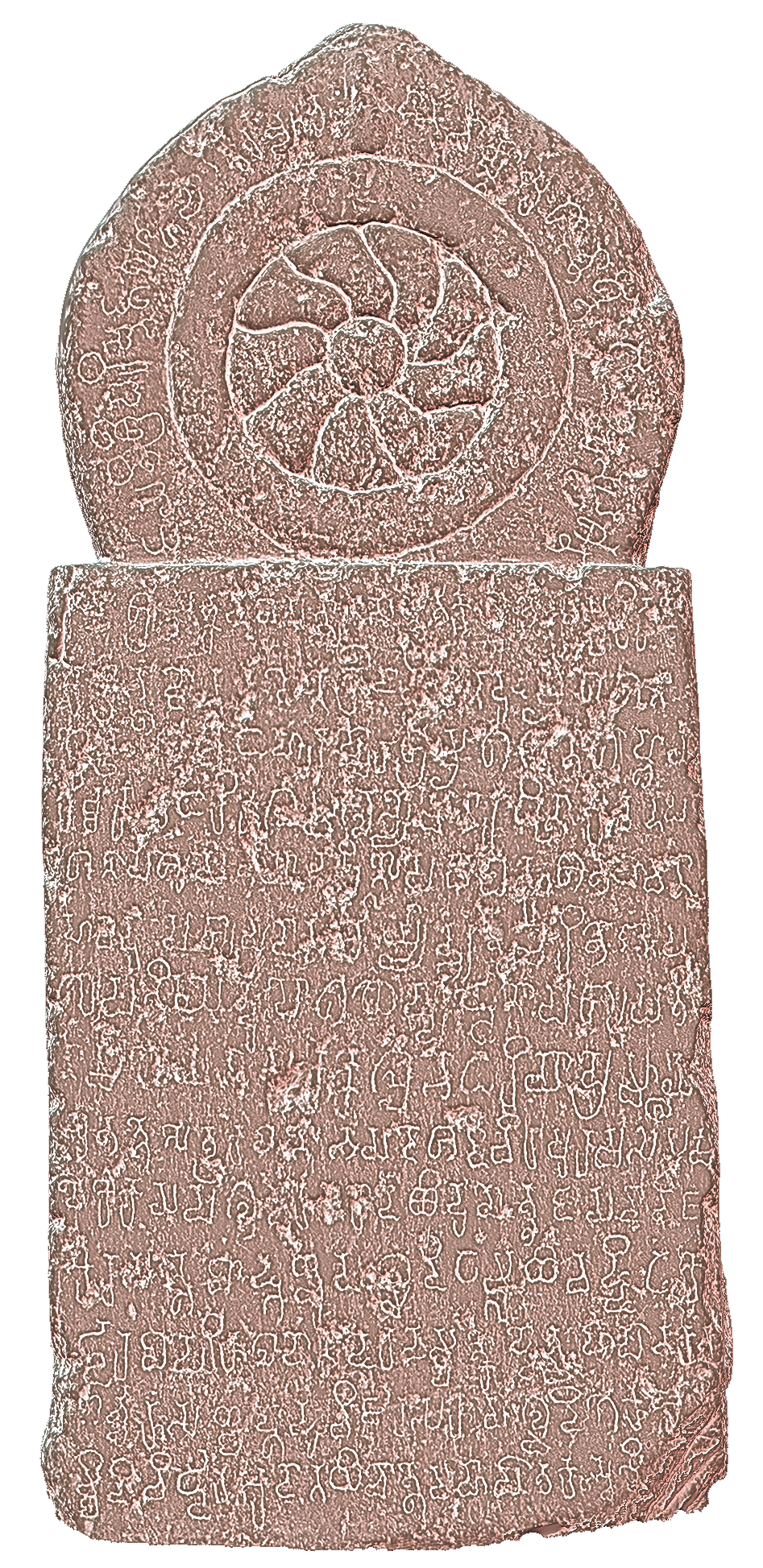
- Digital Twin Image of Halmidi Inscription

General Information
- Dynasty: Kadamba
- Material: Stone
- Inscription type: Endowment Inscription
- Script: Kannada
- Language: Pre-old Kannada
- Condition: Conserved

Discovery
- Place found: Halmidi
- Date discovered: 1936
- Date created: 425CE - 450CE
- Current location: Government Museum, Bengaluru

Contents of the Inscription
- Engraver: Kavi Kubja
- King mentioned: Kakustha
- Cities/Places mentioned: Naridavile Province
- Names of people mentioned: Mrigesa, Naga

Location and Status
- Official designation: Oldest known Kannada-Language Inscription

The Halmidi inscription is the oldest known Kannada-language inscription in the Kadamba script. While estimates vary slightly, the inscription is often dated to between 450 CE - 500 CE. The inscription was discovered in 1936 by Dr. M. H. Krishna, the Director of Archaeology of the (princely) State of Mysore (present-day Karnataka region of India), in Halmidi, a village in the Hassan district.

The original inscription is kept in the Office of the Director of Archaeology and Museums, Govt. of Karnataka, Mysore, and a fibreglass replica has been installed in Halmidi.

== Discovery and dating ==
In a report published in a Mysore Archaeological Department Report (MAR) in 1936, Krishna dated the inscription to 450 AD, on paleographical grounds. Later scholars have variously dated the inscription to 450 AD, 470 AD, 500 AD, "about 500", and "end of the fifth century A. D. or the beginning of the 6th century A.D." Epigraphist, D. C. Sircar has dated the inscription to "about the end of the 6th century."

Linguist Alfred Master dated the inscription to c. A.D. 470 and cited it as early evidence of the Kannada sound change of initial v- to b-, instancing bāḷ, "sword", where Tamil retains vāḷ with the older v-.

Reviewing A. N. Narasimhia's grammar of the oldest Kannada inscriptions in 1943, Dravidian scholar T. Burrow identified Halmidi, dated to about A.D. 450, as the earliest Kannada inscription, and contrasted the record with Tamil, where, he wrote, "a copious body of literary texts, excellently preserved, antedates the earliest inscriptions by several centuries".

The village granted in the inscription, Palmaḍi, is present-day Halmidi itself. Its modern form reflects the historical Kannada sound change by which initial p- became h- (compare Old Kannada pālu > modern hālu, "milk").

Epigraphist, K. V. Ramesh has written about the differing estimates:

And I attribute the origin of this doubt in their minds to the fact that scholars, even the reputed ones, have held differing views, mostly to prop up their preconceived notions, on the palaeographical dating of any given undated or insufficiently dated inscriptions. ... The undated Halmidi (Hassan District, Karnataka) inscription, allegedly written during the reign of Kadamba Kakusthavarman, is taken by some scholars to belong, on palaeographical grounds, to the middle of the 5th century AD, while a few other scholars have held, on the same grounds of palaeography, that it is as late as the second half of the 6th century A.D.

— K. V. Ramesh

He also hypothesized that, compared to possibly contemporaneous Sanskrit inscriptions, "Halmidi inscription has letters which are unsettled and uncultivated, no doubt giving an impression, or rather an illusion, even to the trained eye, that it is, in date, later than the period to which it really belongs, namely the fifth century A.D."

Epigraphist G. S. Gai however disagrees with the view that Halmidi is a record of the Kadamba dynasty identified with King Kadamba Kakusthavarman. According to (Gai 1992), the inscription, which is dedicated to "Kadambapan Kakustha-Bhaṭṭōran," refers to another ruler, Kakustha of the Bhaṭāri family, who is explicitly identified in line 13, "baṭāri-kuladōn=āḷu-kadamban;" in addition, the inscription does not "include any of the epithets like Mānavya-gōtra, Hāritī-putra, and most important Dharma-maharājā" that are a part of all Kadamba inscriptions.

== Text ==
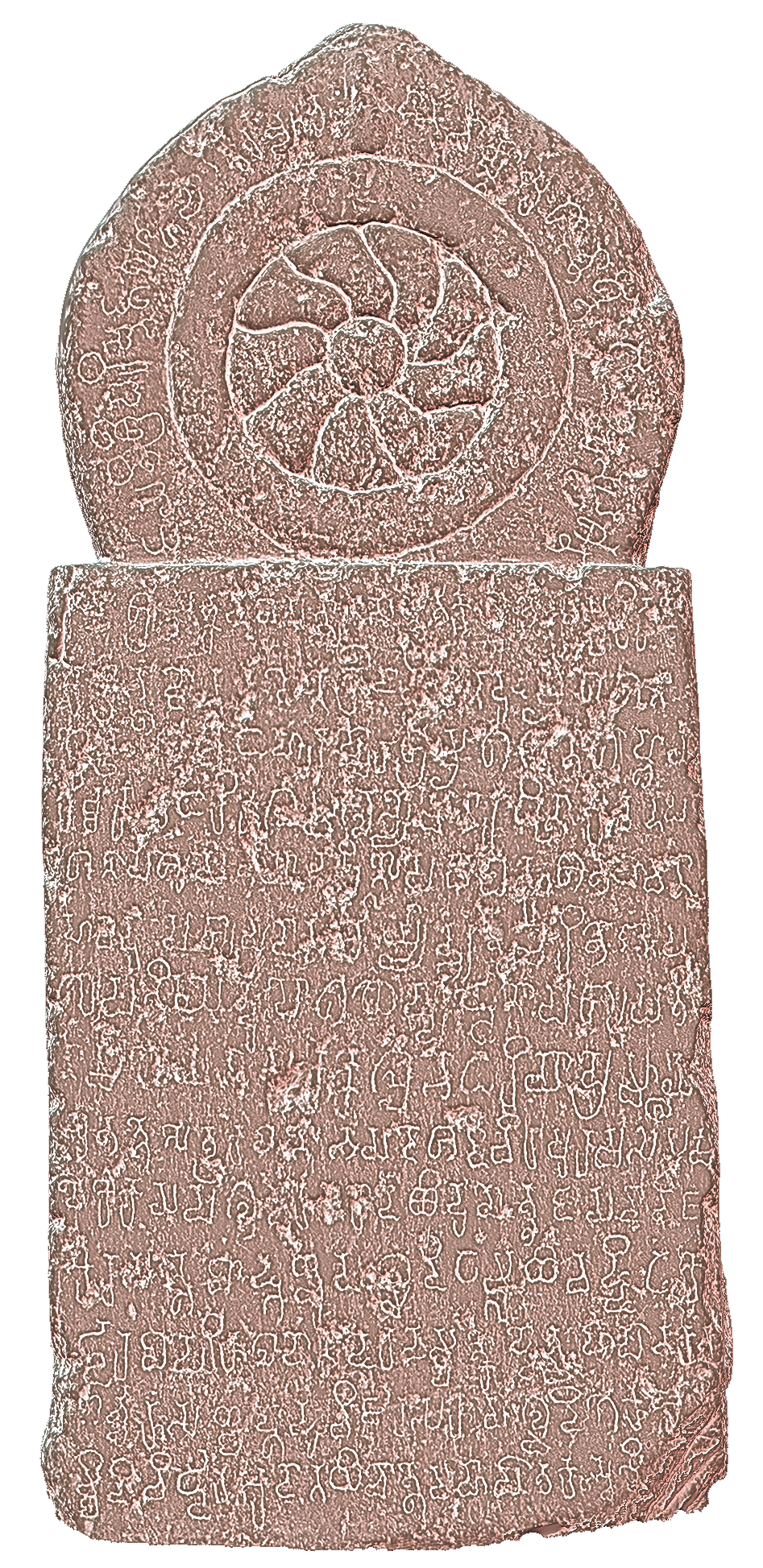
Digital image of the Halmidi inscription.

The inscription is in pre-old Kannada (puruvada-hala Kannada, the ancestor of modern Kannada) verse.

Victorious is Achyuta who is embraced by Shri but has the bow Sharnga bent (ready for use) and who is a fire occurring at the end of the Yugas (cycles of time) to the eyes of the Danavas (demons) but looks pleasing (is a defensive discus) to good people.

Salutation!- During the reign of king Kakustha, the ruler of the Kadambas, who is devoted to the bestowing of gifts and is the enemy of the Kalabhora. the governors(?) in the Naridavile province were Mrigesa and Naga, who were terrible as the lord of beasts (the lion or Shiva) and the lord of elephants (or serpents-Airavata or Ananta).

These two, made a grant for military service of Palmadi and Mulivalli to the beloved son of Ella Bhatari, Vija-Arasa, who in the presence of the heroic men of the two countries, Sendraka and Bana, fought the Kekayas and Pallavas, pierced them and attained victory at the word of the moon to the spotless firinament called Bhatarikula, named the great Pashupati who is a Pasupati (or Siva) to the Ganas who are the Alapas and who is full of heroism and action in giving away (slaying) cows (sacrificial beasts) in many hundreds of sacrifices which are battles in the great Dakshinapatha (Southern India) and is praised as the Pasupati (or Siva) in bestowing gifts.

Alu Kadamba of the Bhatarikula. He who takes away this grant is guilty of the great sins.

The two and Vija Arasa of Salbanga granted Kurumbidi to Palmadi. The destroyer of this grant will incur great sin.

In the gross produce of this rice land a revenue of one tenth is granted to the learned Brahmins free of taxes.

— Annual report of the Mysore Archaeological Department for the year 1936

== See also ==
- Indian inscriptions
- Indian copper plate inscriptions
