= Varuna, Mysore =

Varuna
- Interactive map of Varuna
- Coordinates: 12.26792°N 76.74405°E
- Country: India
- State: Karnataka
- District: Mysore
- Time zone: UTC+5:30 (IST)
- PIN: 570010
- Telephone code: 0821

Varuna is a village in Mysore district of Karnataka state, India.

== Location ==
Varuna village is located on Tirumakudal Narsipur road, 13.3 km from Mysore. The road from Mysore to Tirumakudal Narsipur forks at Varuna junction. The left deviation continues to T.Nrasipura and Somanathpur. The right deviation goes to Varuna and Sutturu Mutt. The road is well maintained in two lanes.

== Landmarks ==
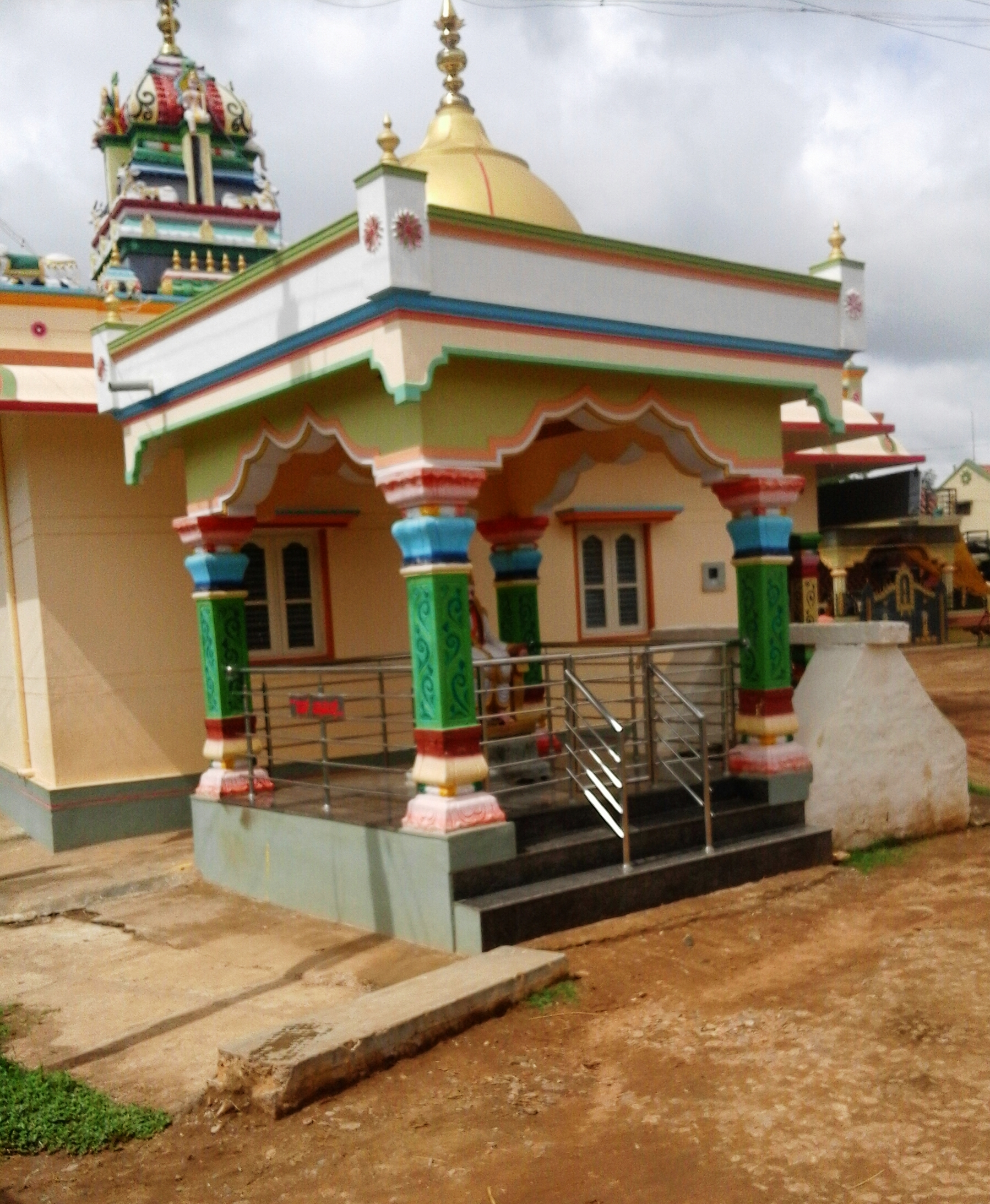
Varuna village

The housing colony called Lal Bahadhur Shastri Nagar is only three kilometers from Varuna village. J.S.S. Layout is within four km. Shanthaveri gopal Gowda Nagar is also within four km from Varuna. Varuna is surrounded by Nanjangud, T.Narasipur and Shrirangapattana taluks. The nearest cities are Mysore and Nanjangud.

== Temples ==
Varuna village has Basveshwara Temple and a statue of Lord Basvanna founder of Lingayat society. The village has ancient temples which are built by cholas. The village is near Sutturu Mutt is the spiritual center of Lingayath community of Karnataka state. The mutt runs more than 300 schools in India and abroad.

== Post office ==
There is a post office in Varuna and the postal code is 570010. The post office is called PTC Campus because there is a postal training center there.

== Access ==
The nearest railway station is Mysore. The nearest airport is Mandakali. There are direct roads from Bannur, Mysore, Nanjangud and T.Narasipur.

== Education ==
There is one primary school in Varuna and one high school in Suttur. Colleges are available in Mysore, 13 km away.

== Villages and suburbs ==
- Hosakotal village
- Suttur Mutt
- Dandikere village
- Chikkahalli village
- Keelanpura village

== Demographics ==
Varuna has a total population of 2,350 people in 529 families as per the 2011 census. The literacy is 62%. Varuna village has 300 lingayat families and 150 Scheduled caste families. The village also consists of 50 Muslim families.

== Administration ==
Varuna village is administered by the head of the village locally called as a sarpanch. The sarpanch is elected democratically every five years. There are a total of 529 houses in Varuna.

== Economy ==
The people of the village are mostly engaged in agricultural work. Some of them work in Mysore city as the distance is only 13 km.

== See also ==
- Sutturu
- Nagarle
- Alambur
- Kahalli
- Chikkahalli Choranahalli
