= Nadanahalli =

Nandanahalli, Mysore
- Interactive map of Nandanahalli, Mysore
- Coordinates: 12.29472°N 76.70843°E
- Country: India
- State: Karnataka
- District: Mysore
- Time zone: UTC+5:25 (IST)
- PIN: 570028

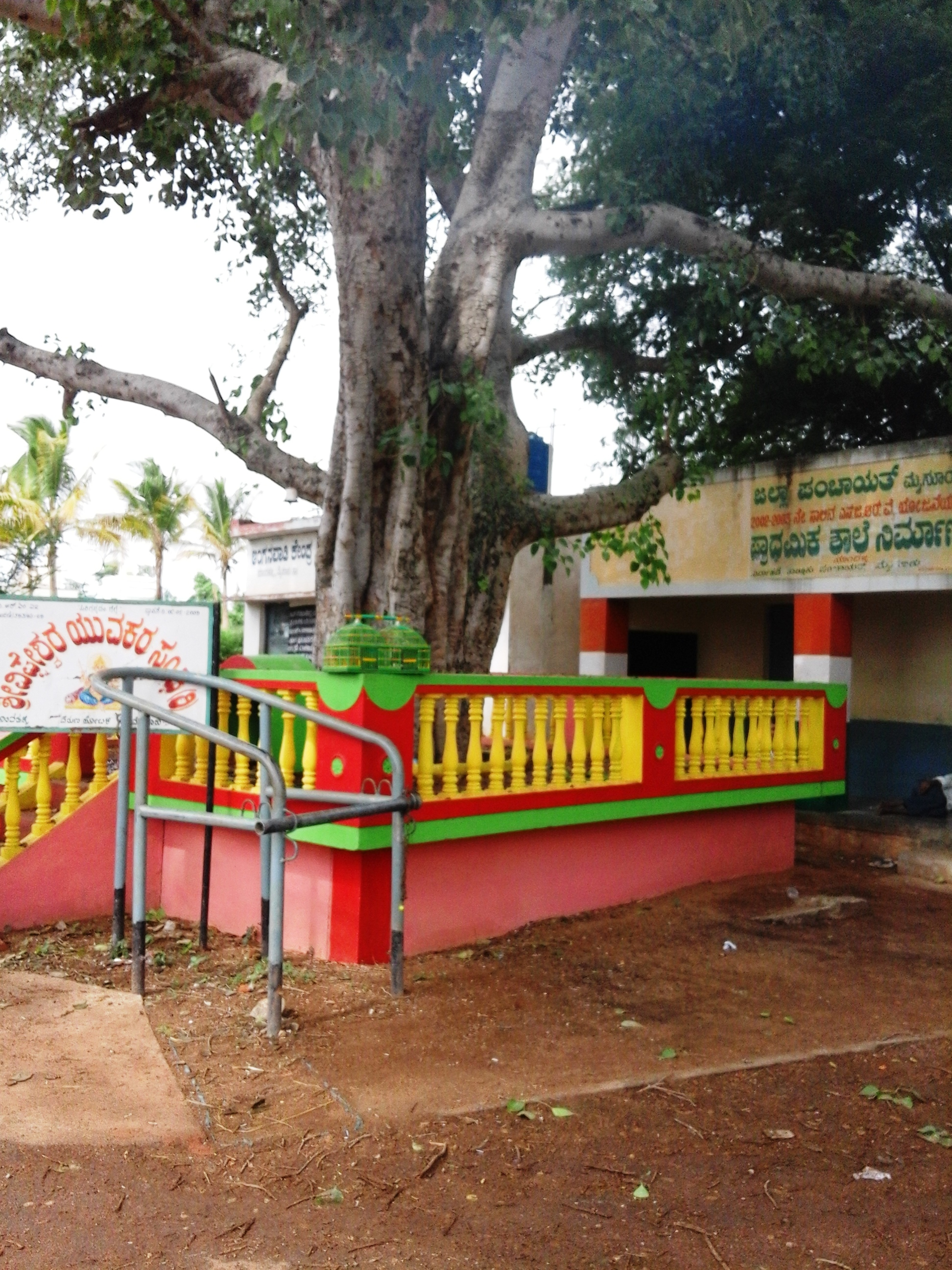
Yandhahalli hamlet in Nadanahali

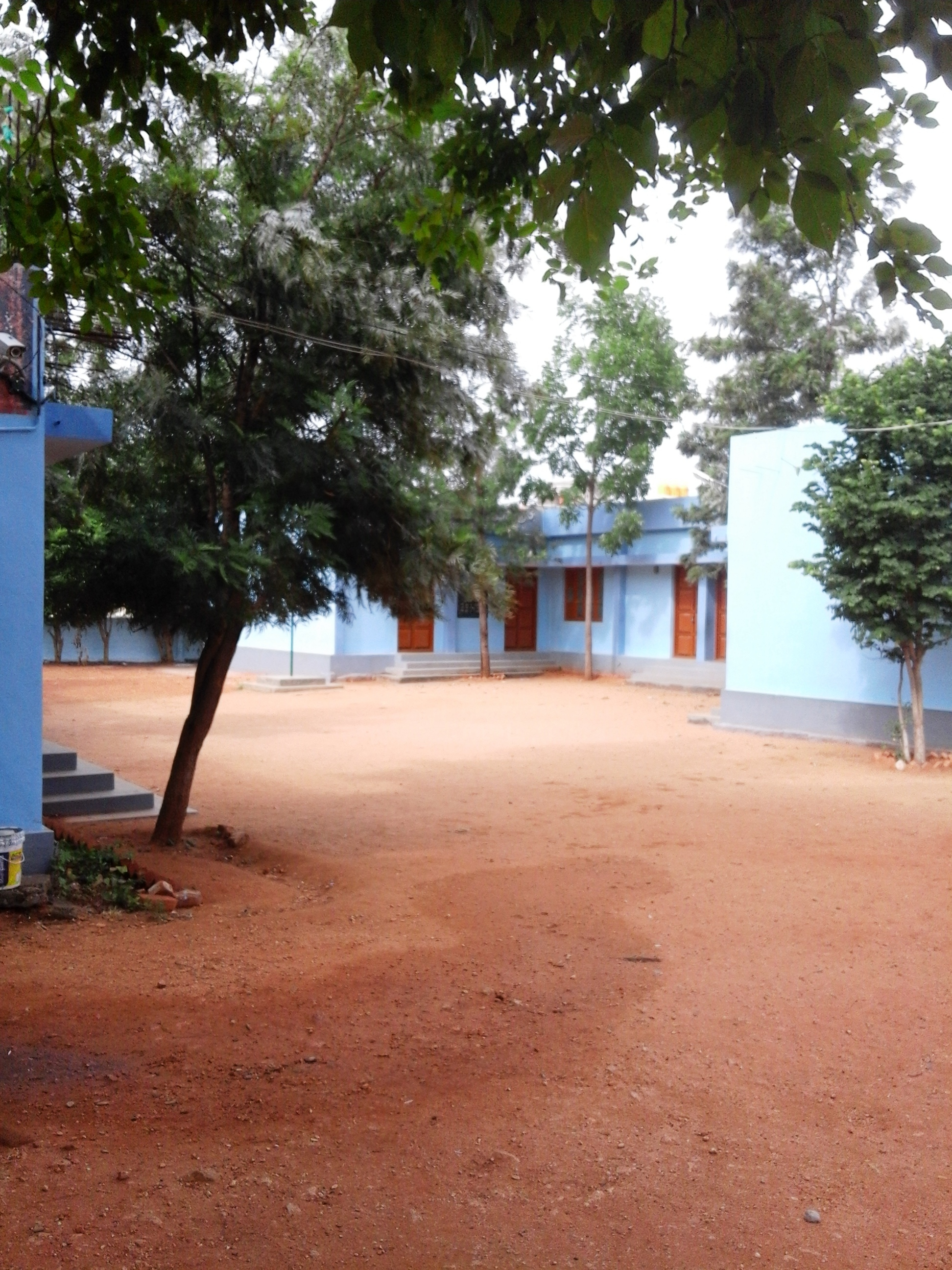
School in Alanahalli hamlet near Nandanahalli

Nadanahalli is a small village near Mysore city in Karnataka province of India.

== Location ==
Nadanahalli is located on the eastern side of Mysore city on the T.Narasipura road. It is at a distance of ten kilometers from Mysore city center.

== Demographics ==
Nandanhalli had 652 families and a total population of 2,808 according to the census of 2011. The literacy rate was 72%. The village is headed by a sarpanch.

== See also ==
- Chikkahalli Choranahalli
- Sutturu
- Varuna village

== Gallery ==
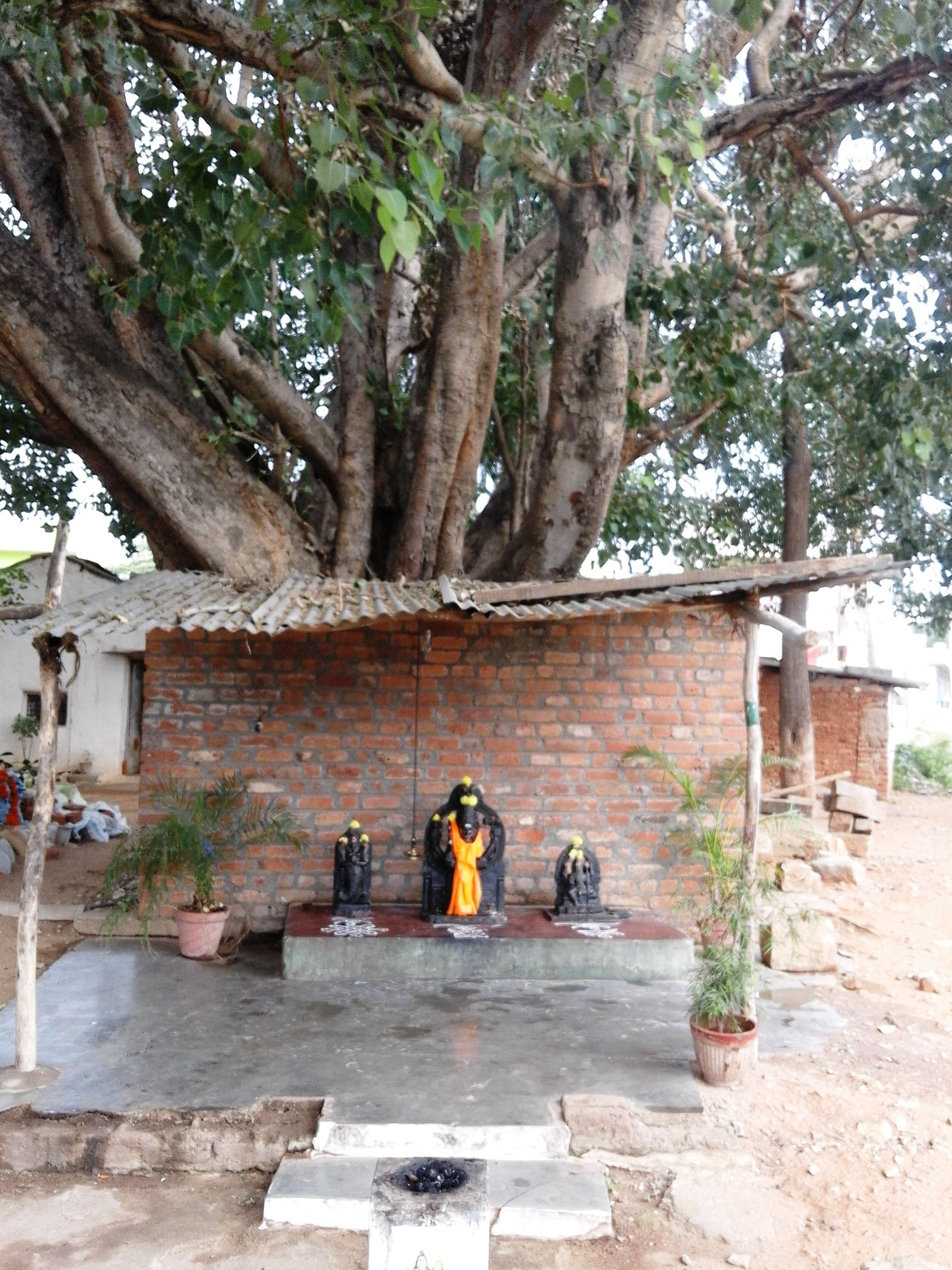
Tree worship

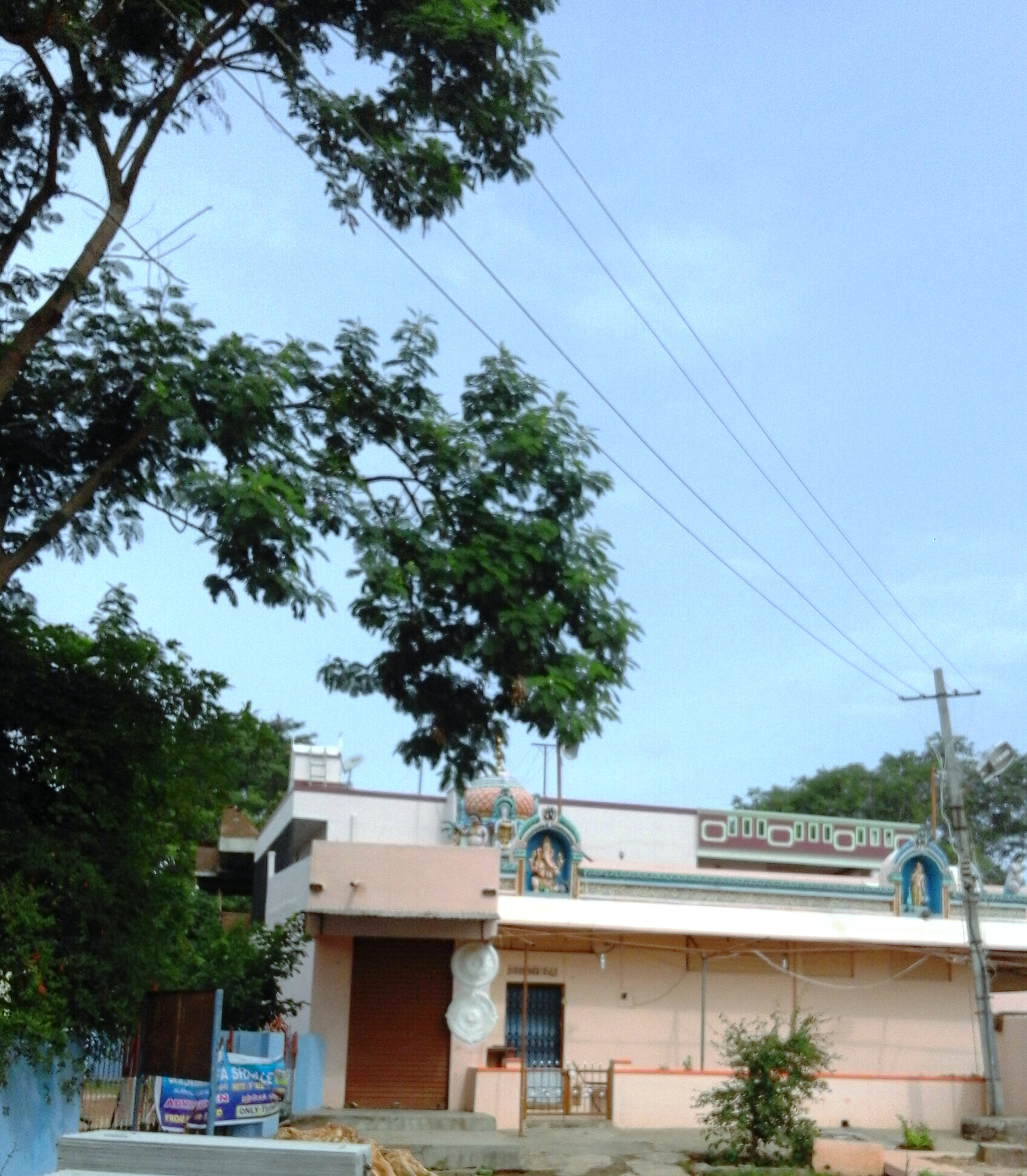
Temple in Alanahalli

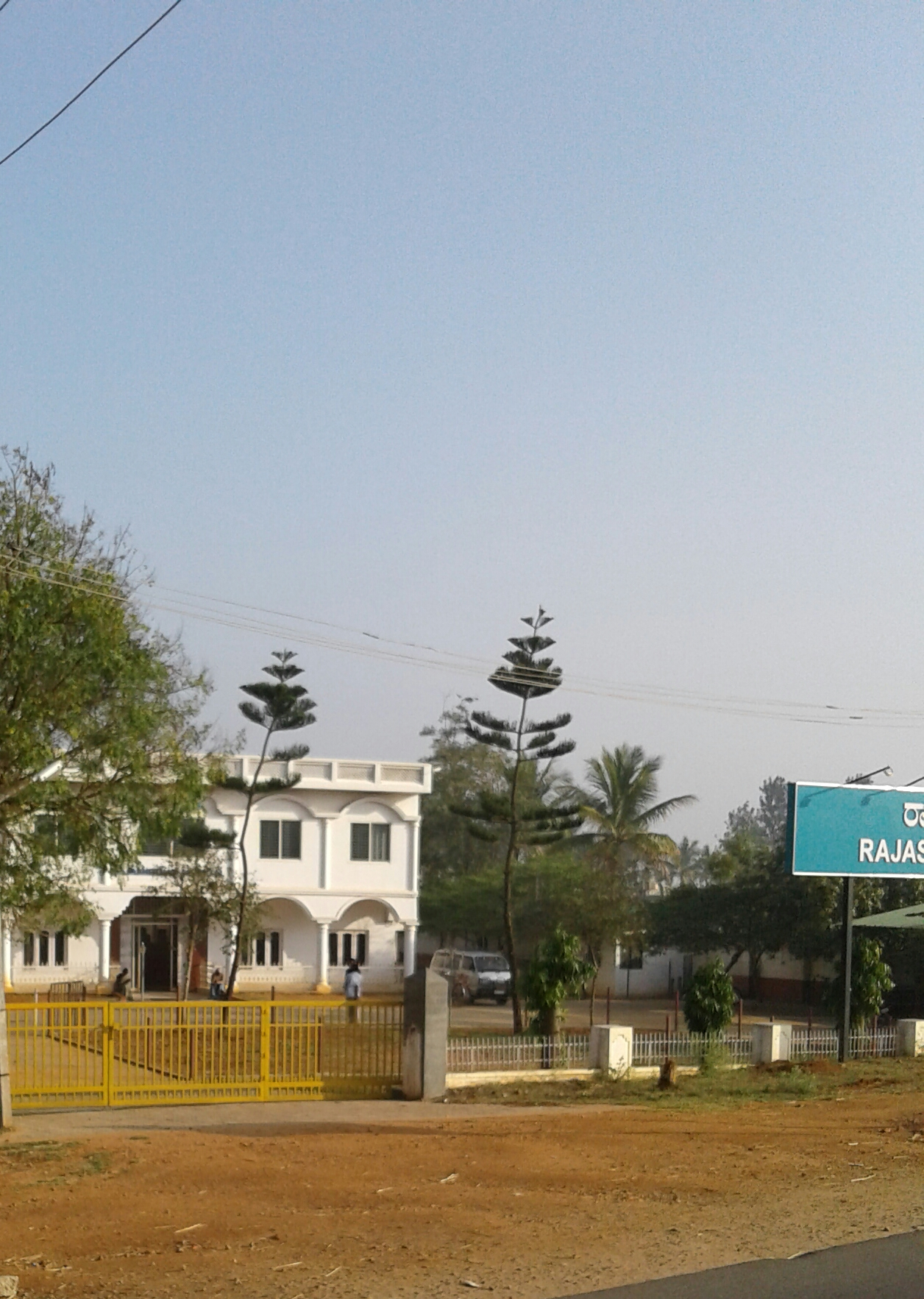
Dr.Rajasekhara Hospital
