= Jeemaralli =

Jeemaralli Biligere
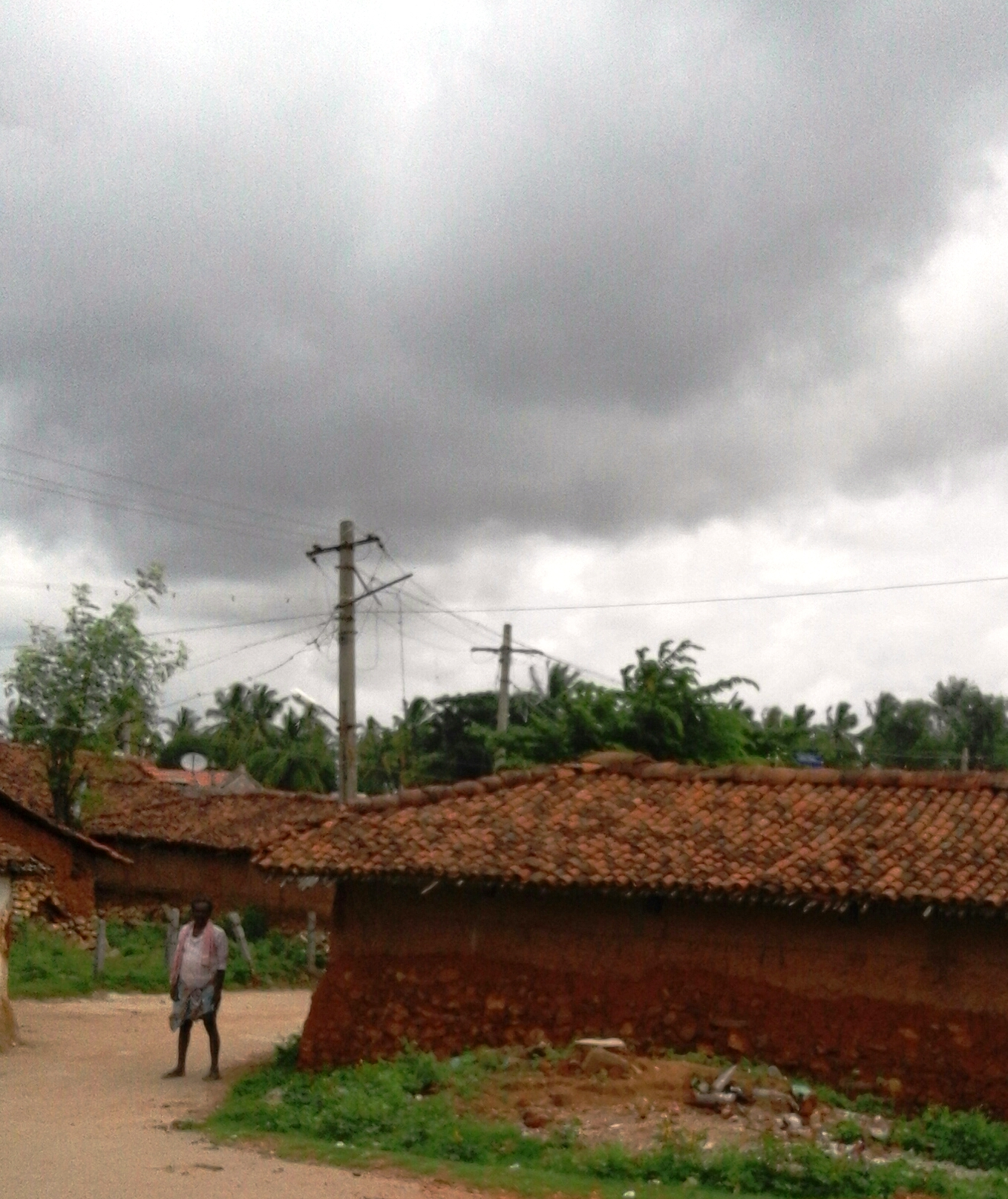
- Biligere, Jeemaralli
- Interactive map of Jeemaralli
- Coordinates: 12.15463°N 76.80602°E
- Country: India
- State: Karnataka
- District: Mysore
- Time zone: UTC+5:25 (IST)
- PIN: 571129
- Telephone code: 0821

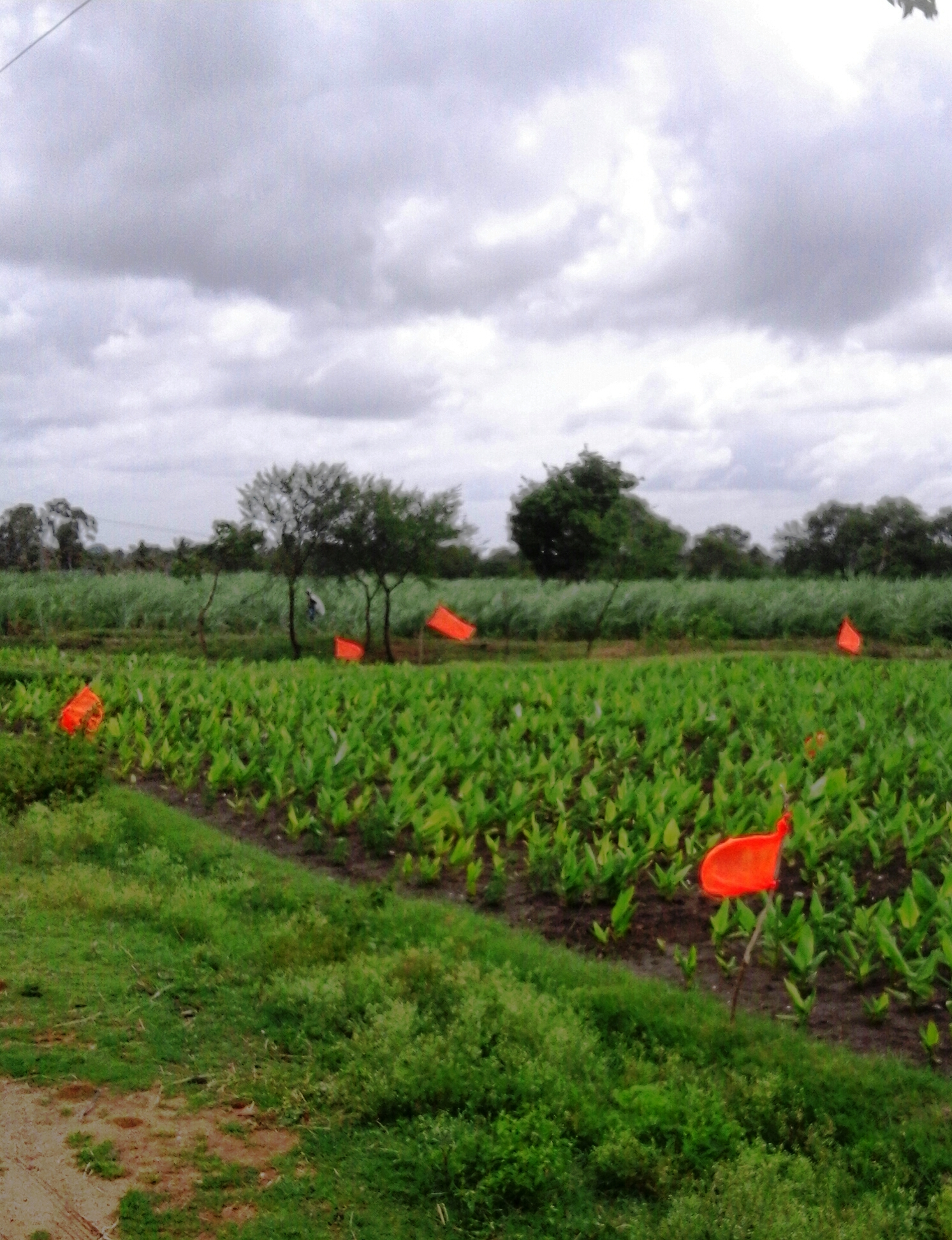
Farms in Jeemaralli

Biligere is a small village in Nanjangud taluk of Mysore district in Karnataka state, India.

== Location ==
Jeemaralli is located near Suttur in Nanjangud taluk.

== Demographics ==
There are 1,334 people in the village according to the latest census. The density of population is 273 persons per km^{2}. There are 315 houses in the village. Literacy rate is 56%.

== Geography ==
The village is 5 km^{2} (1.9 sq mi) in size.

== Transportation ==
The nearest town is T.Narsipur at a distance of 12 km (7.5 mi).

== Temples ==
- Jeemaralli Devasthana
- Venugopala Devasthana, Billigere
- Sutturu Mutt, the headquarters of the Lingayath community.

== Administration ==
The village is administered as a part of Suttur panchayath. Nearest town of the village is T. Narsipur and distance from Jeemaralli village to T. Narsipur is 12 km.

== Post Office ==
The village has a postal service from Nagarle post office and the pin code is 571129.

== Biligere village ==
Biligere village is part of Jeemaralli. There is a primary school and a hospital in Biligere. Most of the people in this village are farmers belonging to five different Hindu castes. There is an ancient temple in Biligere which is demolished for reconstruction purpose. The government of Karnataka has sanctioned Rs.23 lakhs for the work.

== Literacy ==
The village has a lower literacy rate compared to other parts of Karnataka. In 2011, the literacy was 55%.

== See also ==
- Sutturu
- Nagarle
- Alambur
- Kahalli

== Image gallery ==
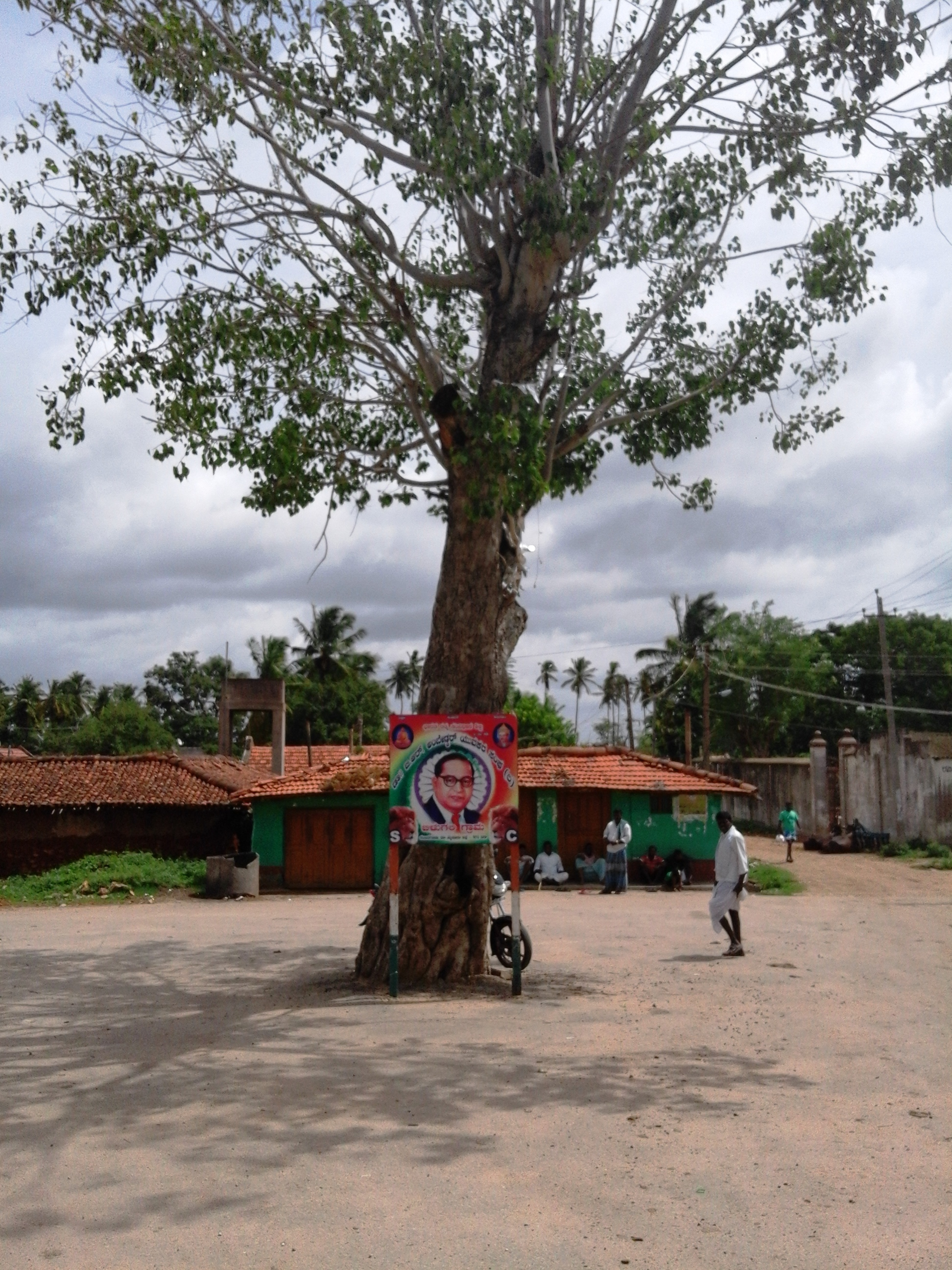
Bligere village centre

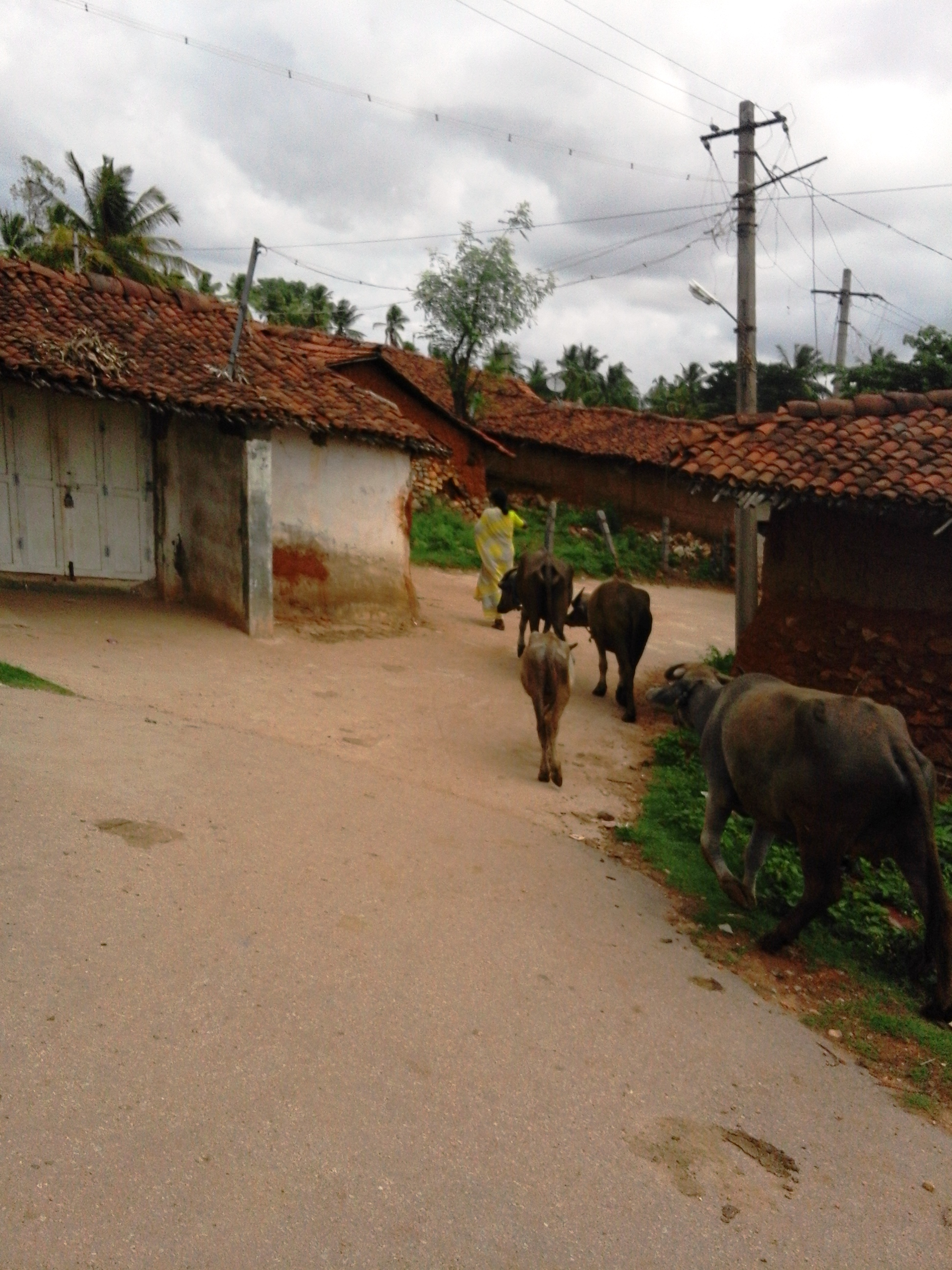
Cattle in Biligere

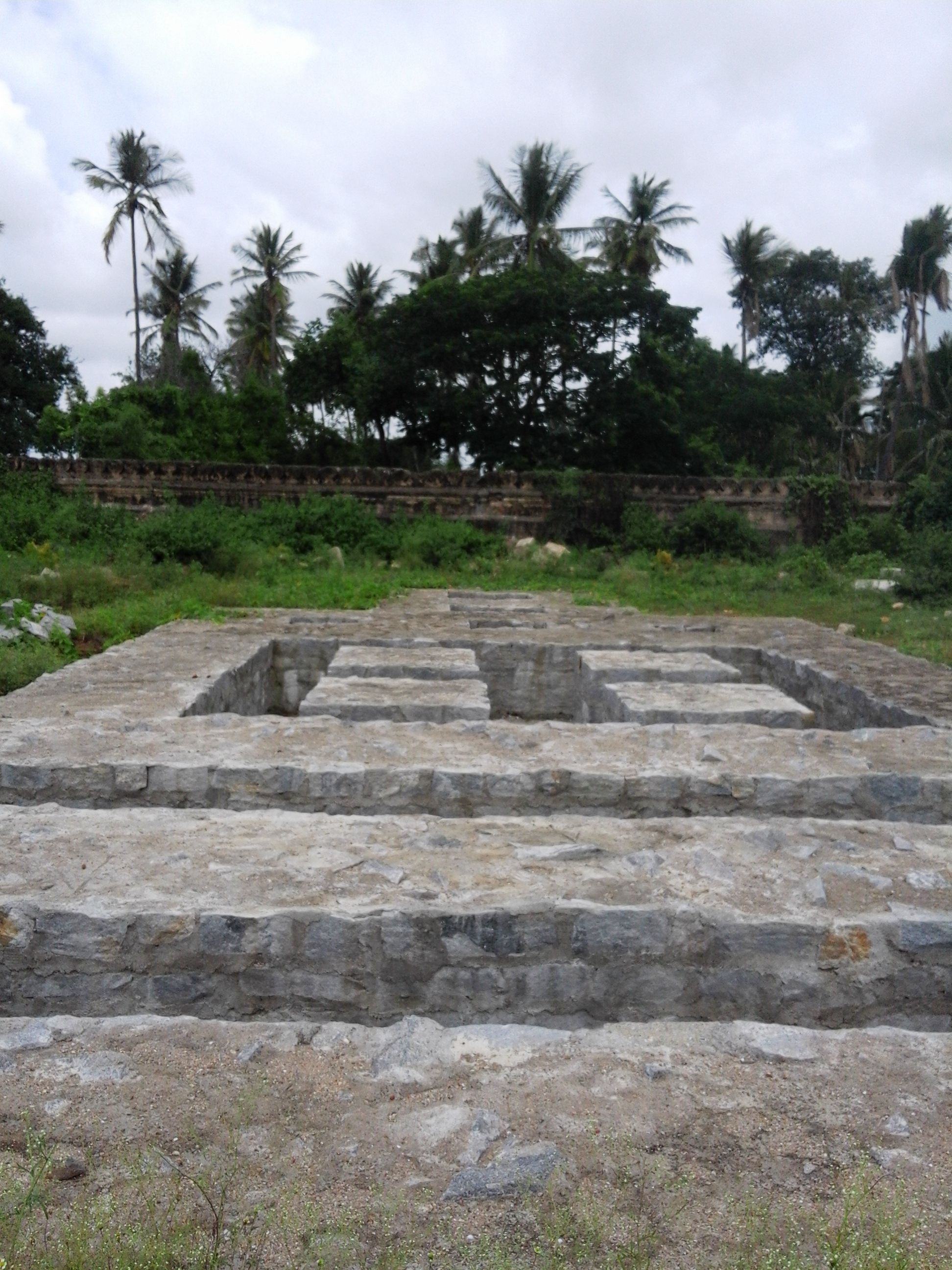
Temple renovation

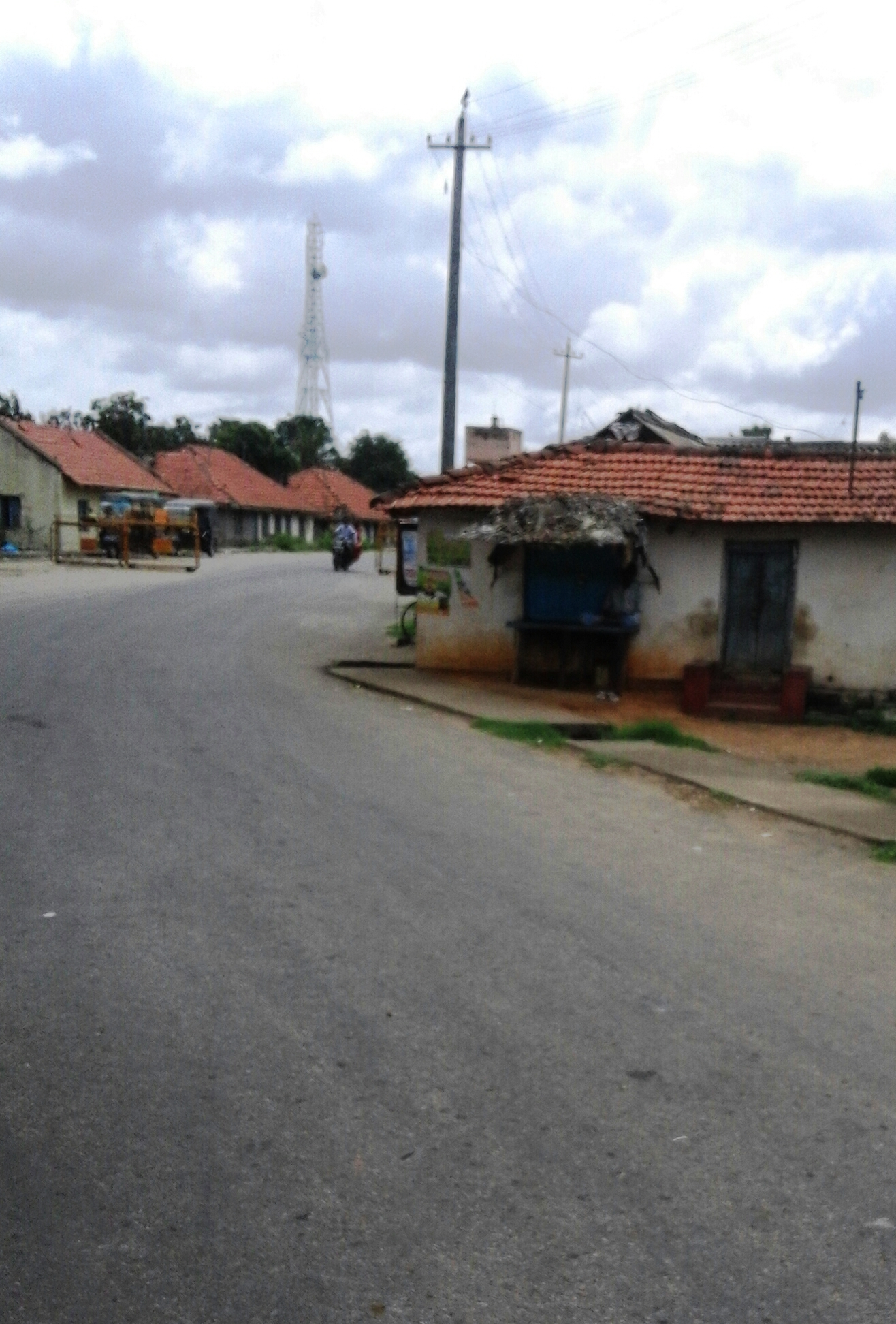
Sutturu road
