= Chikkahalli Choranahalli =

Coordinates: 12.269848°N 76.730468°E

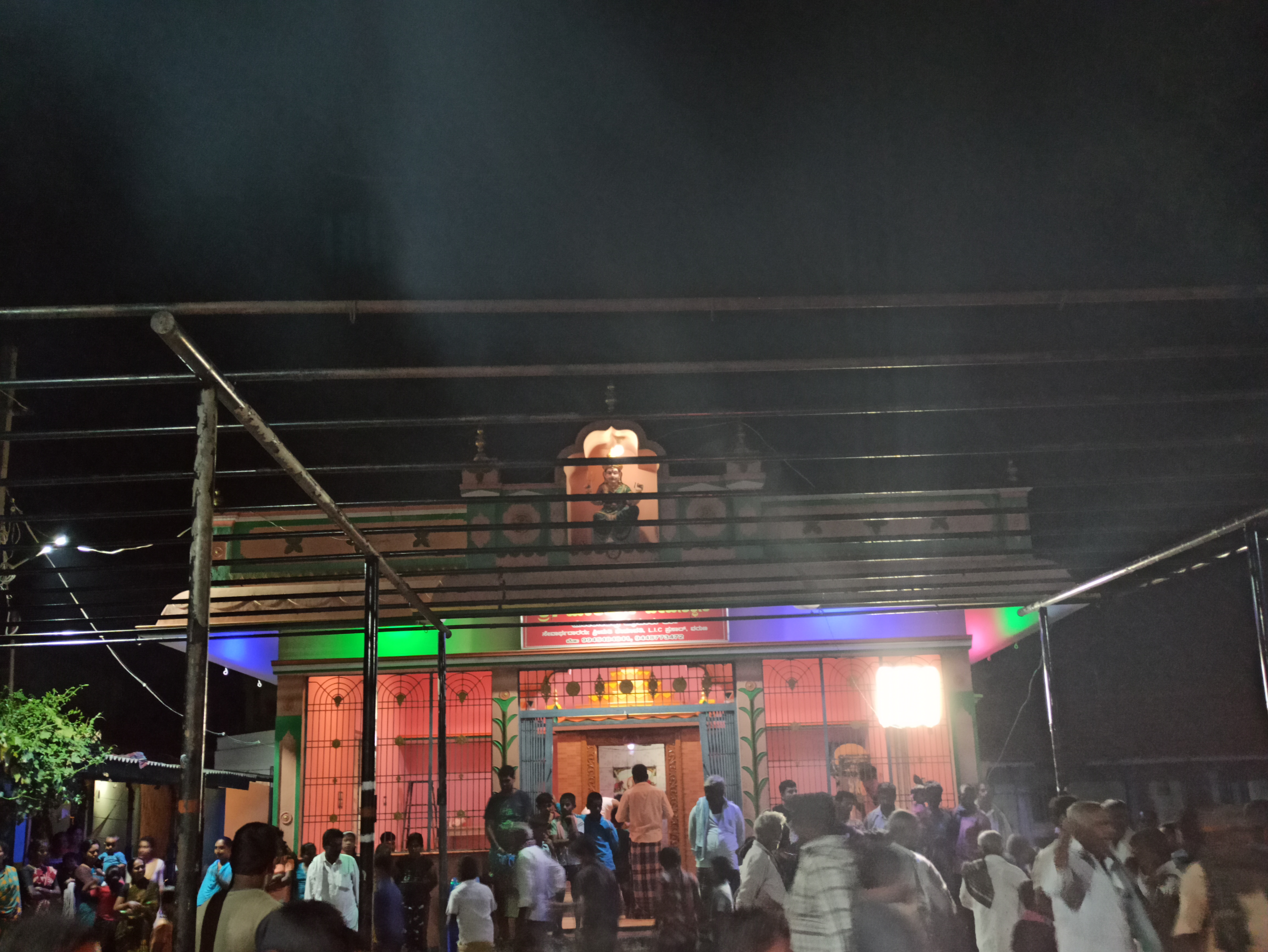

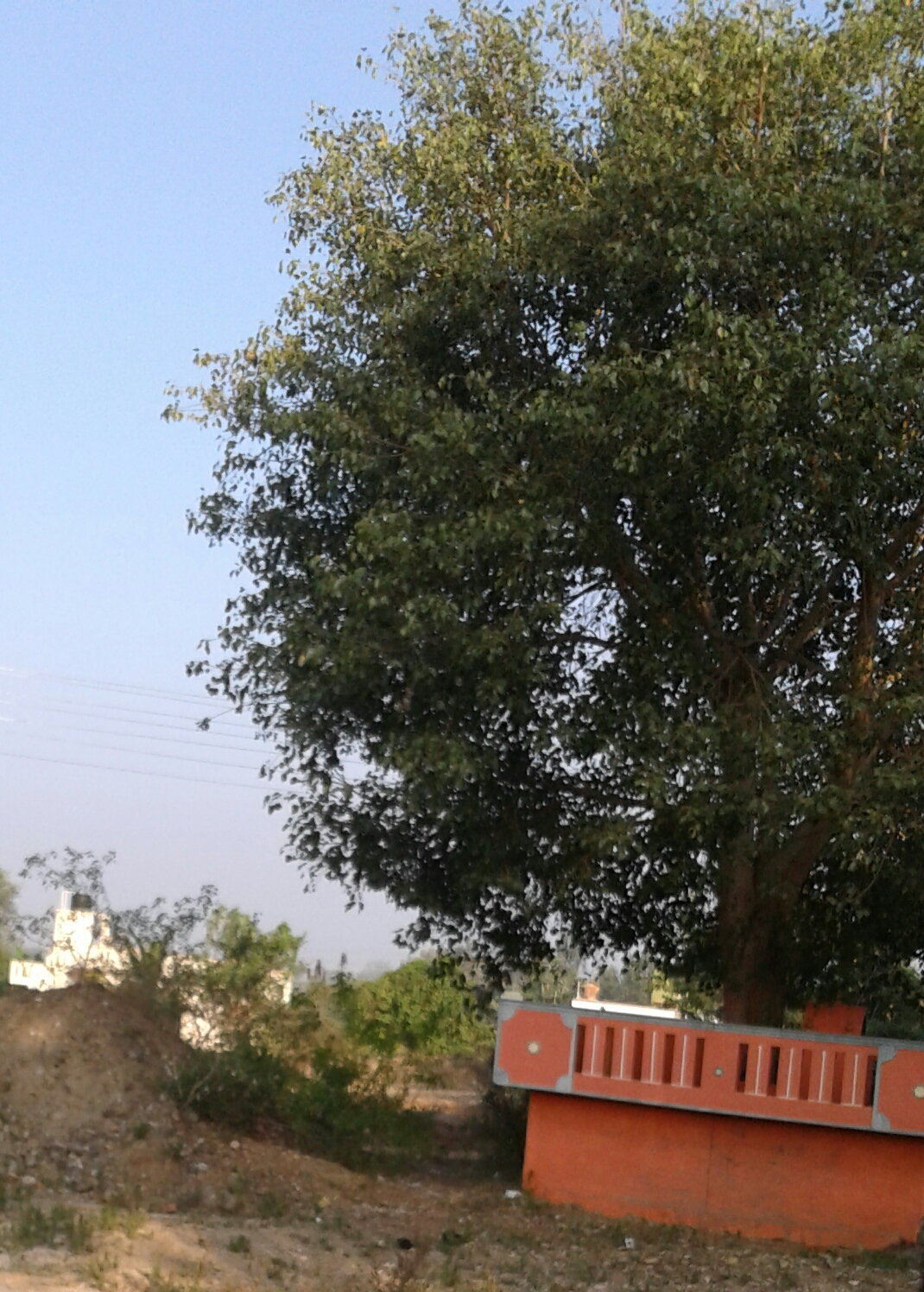
Tree Worship in Chikkalli

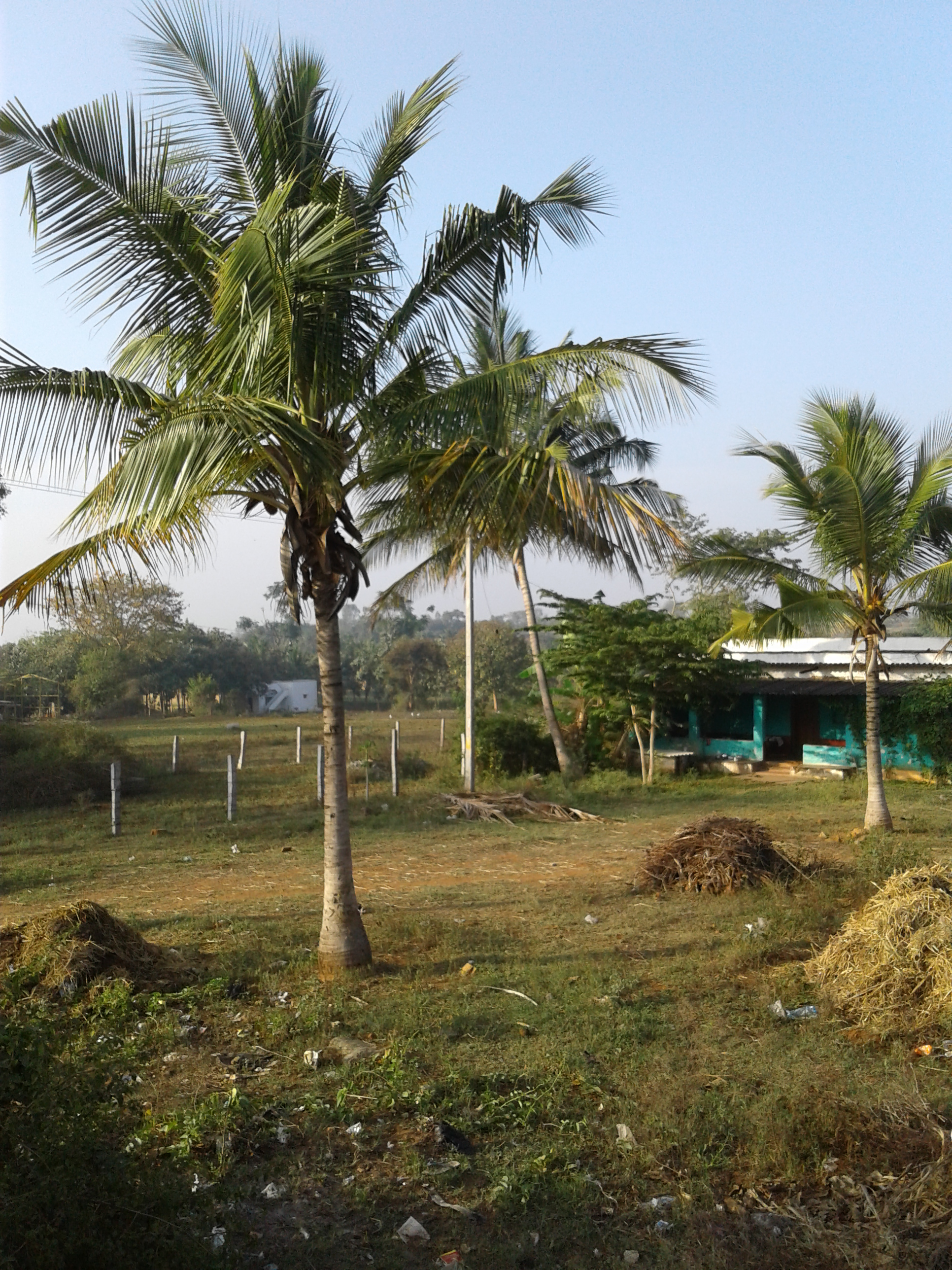
Choranahalli Village

Choranalli is a village near Mysore city, Karnataka state, India.

== Location ==
Choranahalli is a village in Mysuru district and is around just 11.5 km from the city centre. The village comes under Varuna Grama Panchayath and is surrounded by Chikkalli, Varuna, Janthagalli, Yandalli and Lalithadripura villages.

== Demographics ==
Choranahalli village has a population of 2,213 people according to the 2011 census. There are 528 houses in the village.

== Administration ==
The village is administered as part of Varuna Gram Panchayath which is again part of Mysore Taluk.

== Education ==
- The village has a government school and offers primary education up to 7th standard.
- Eashwar Vidyalaya, Choranahalli.

== See also ==
- Varuna Village
- Nadanahalli
- Sutturu
