= Alambur =

Coordinates: 12.118446°N 76.724994°E

Alambur (also Alamburu) is a village in Mysore district of Karnataka, India.

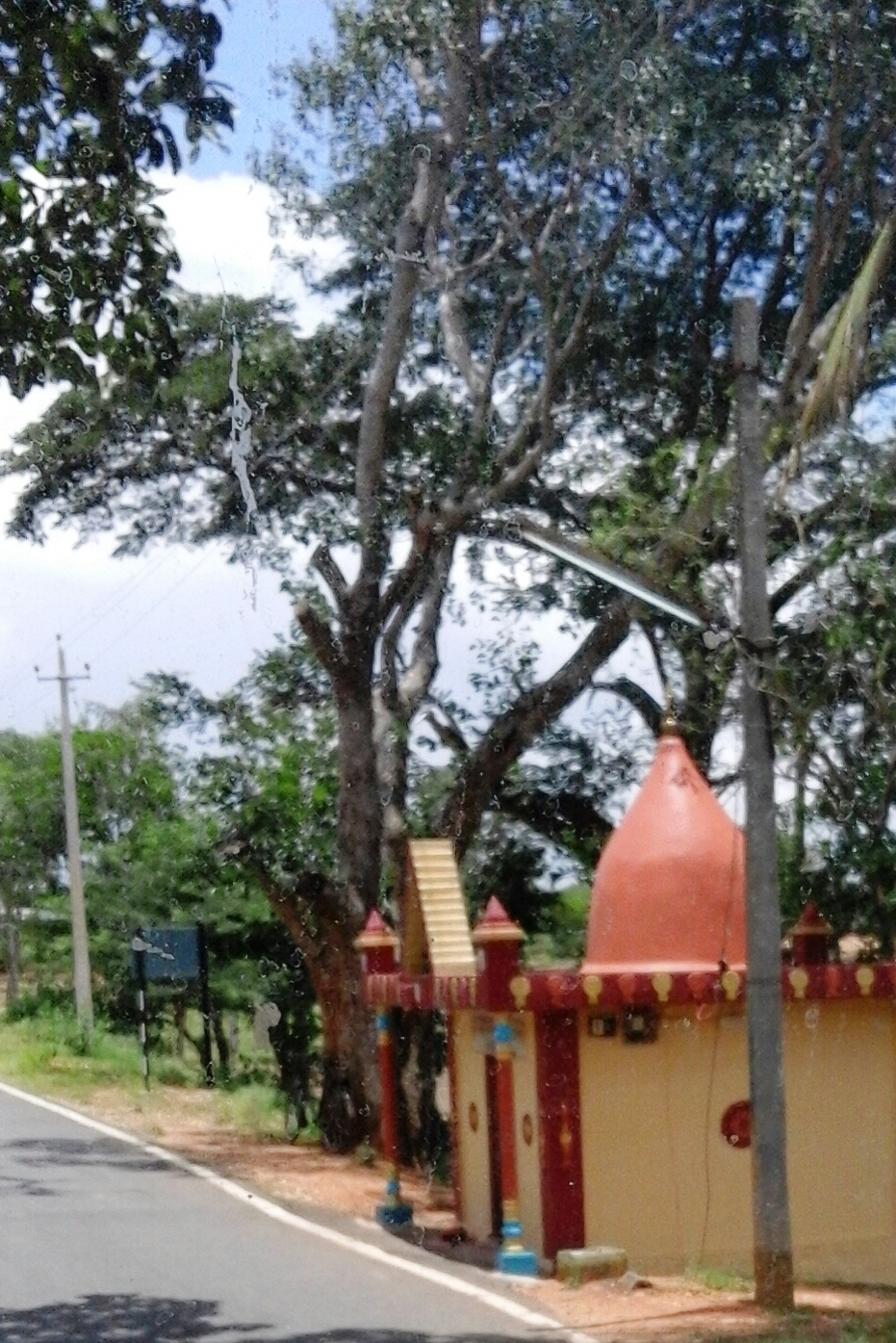
Basavanapura, Alambur

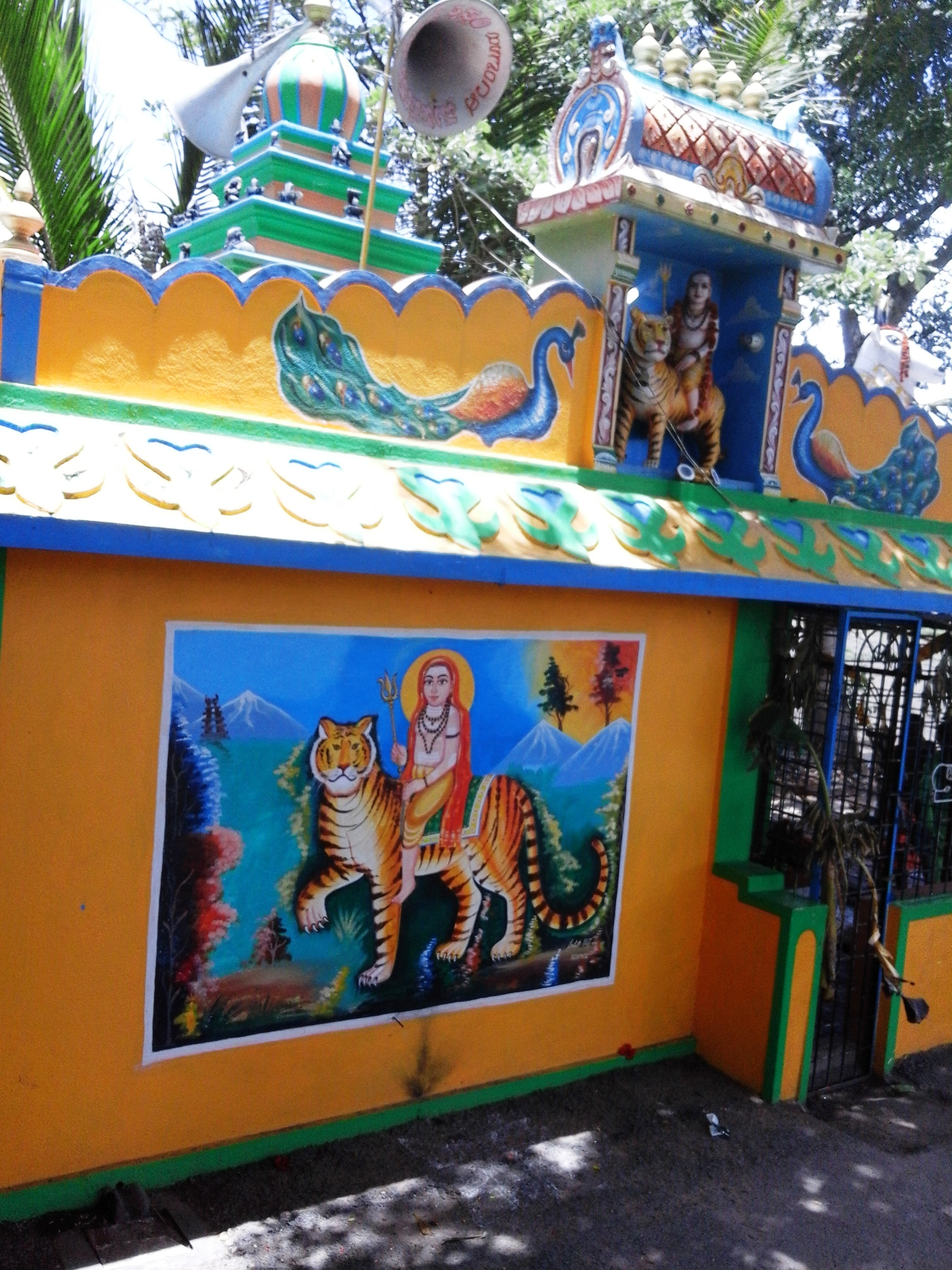
Alamburu Village

== Location ==
Alambur is located on the road from Nanjangud to Tirumakudal Narsipur.

== Schools ==
The Government Higher Primary School was established in 1946. The school has six teachers handling classes from one to eight.

== Demographics ==
Alambur has a population of 2,073, with a total of 488 families. Literacy is 51%.

== Administration ==
Alambur village is administered by the village council called a Panchayath. It comes under Nanjangod Taluk.

== See also ==
- Jeemaralli
- Kahalli
- Nagarle
- Sutturu
