= Nagarle =

Coordinates: 12.146237°N 76.764671°E

Nagarle is a village in Mysore district of Karnataka state, India.

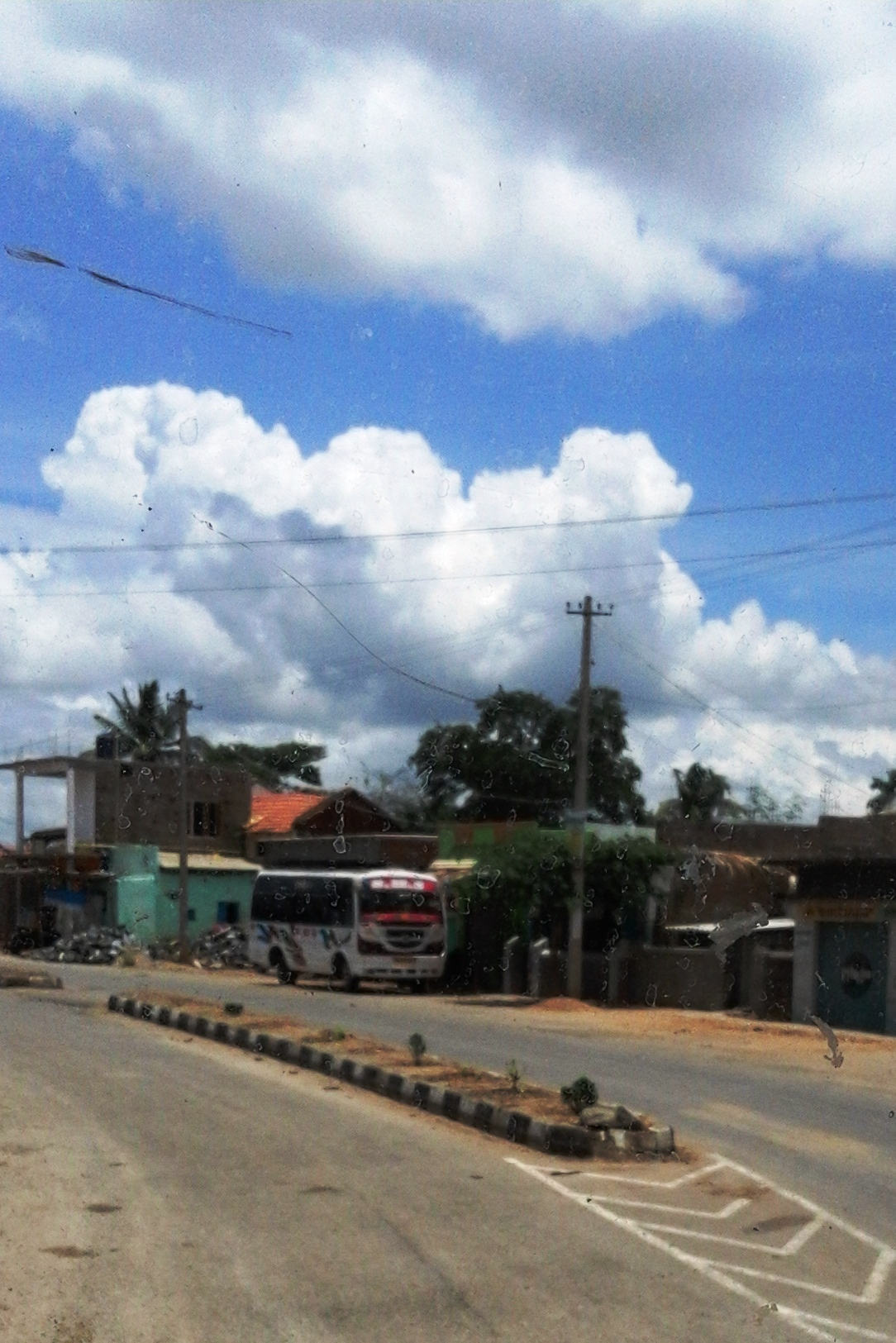
Nagarle village in Nanjangud taluk

== Location ==
Nagarle is located on the road from Nanjangud to T. Narasipur town.

== Administration ==
Nagarle is part of Nanjangud taluk in Mysore district. The village is administrated by a Sarpanch (Head of Village) who is an elected representative.

== Access ==
Nagarle village is 26 km from Mysore and 11 km from Nanjangud. It is 149 km from Bangalore.

== Demographics ==
The population of the village is 3,655 and there are a total of 870 families there. The literacy rate is 69%.

== Villages and suburbs ==
- Hadinaru.4 km
- Hulimavu, 4 km
- Suthur, 4 km
- Horalavadi, 4 km
- Thumerale, 7 km

== Post Office ==
There is a post office at Nagarle and the postal code is 571129.

== Railway Station ==
The nearest railway stations are Chinnadagudihundi, Badanavalu and Nanjangud.

== Education ==
- Government HP School, Nagarle

== See also ==
- Jeemaralli
- Sutturu
- Alambur
- Kahalli
