= Kahalli =

Indian village

Coordinates: 12.153179°N 76.836058°E

Kahalli is a small village in Mysore district of Karnataka state, India.

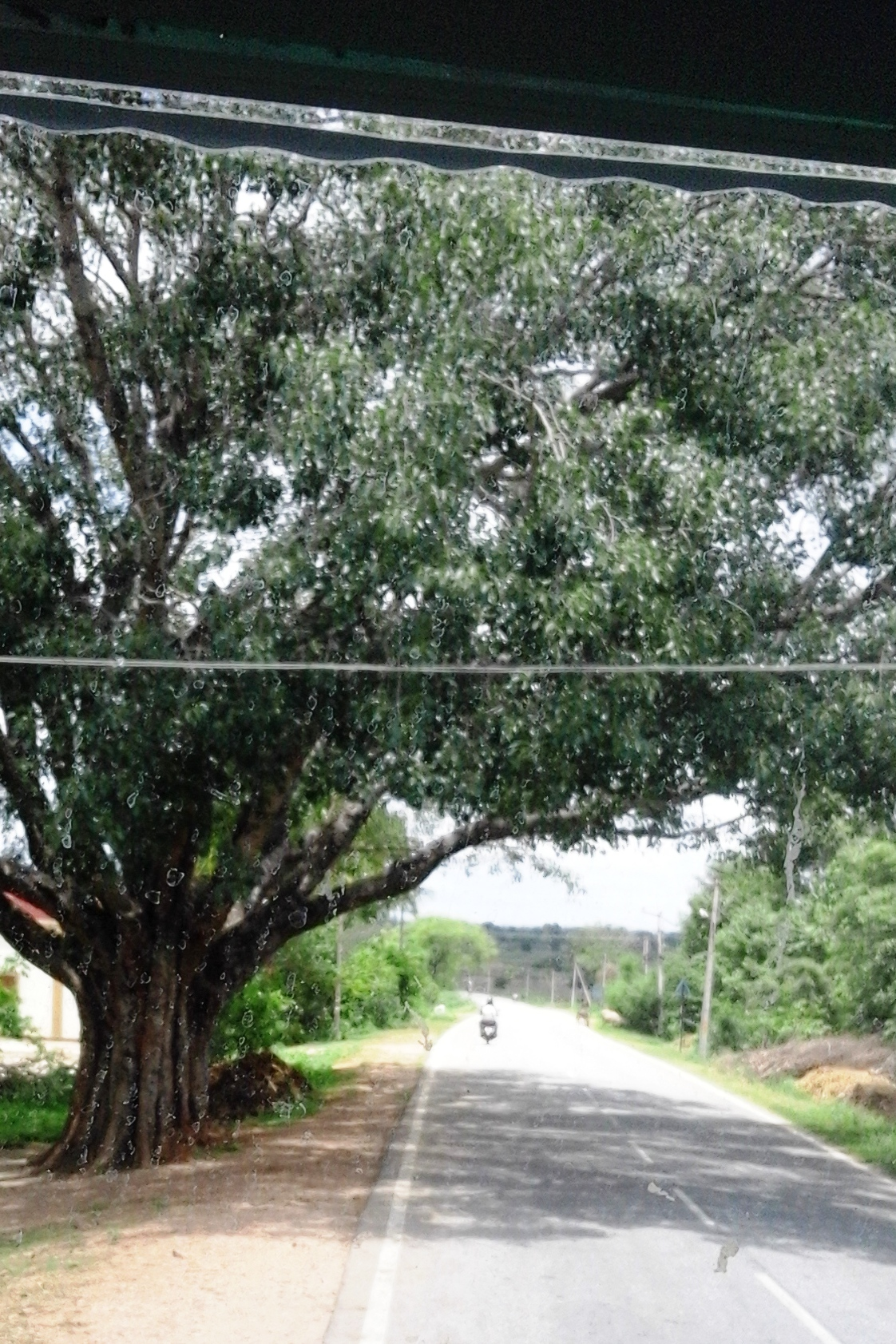
Kahalli village

== Administration ==
Kahalli has its own village government called Panchayath. It comes under Nanjangud taluk.

== Demographics ==
The total area of the village is 137 hectares. The population is 508 people in 124 houses.

== See also ==
- Jeemaralli
- Sutturu
- Nagarle
- Alambur
