= Sutturu =

Sutturu Suttur, Suthur, Suththur
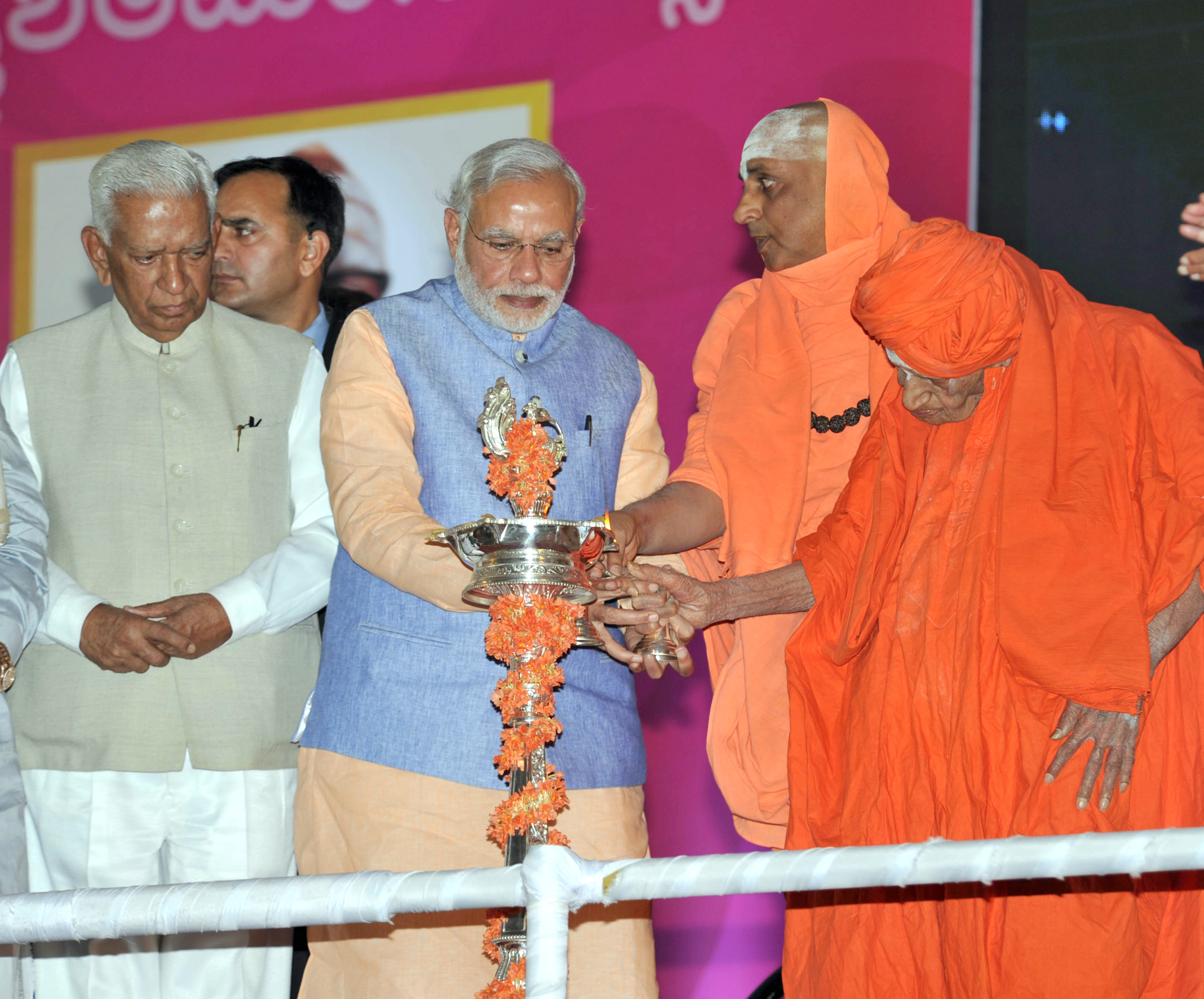
- Indian Prime Minister at Suttur Matt in 2016

- Location within Karnataka Location within India
- Coordinates: 12.16730°N 76.79508°E
- Country: India
- State: Karnataka
- District: Mysore
- Time zone: UTC+5:30 (IST)
- PIN: 571129
- Telephone code: 0821

Sutturu, also spelled Suttur or Suthur, is a village in Karnataka, India. Situated on the banks of the river Kapila, Suttur is located approximately 20 kilometres (12 miles) from Mysore.
