= List of Kannada-language poets =

Kannada poetry dates back many centuries, to before the time of Adikavi Pampa. A revival took place in the early 20th century led by Kuvempu, Dattatreya Ramachandra Bendre, B. M. Srikanthaiah and others. The genre was further developed after Indian independence with poets including Gopalakrishna Adiga.

== A ==
- Gopalakrishna Adiga
- K. S. Nissar Ahmed
- Amoghavarsha
- U. R. Ananthamurthy
- Kappe Arabhatta
- Asaga (9th century)
- Aravind Malagatti
- Anupama Niranjana
- Aryamba Pattabhi
- P. V. Acharya
- Udyavara Madhava Acharya
- Akbar Ali (poet)
- Annadanaiah Puranik

== B ==
- Basavanna
- D. R. Bendre
- S.L.Bhairappa
- N. S. Lakshminarayan Bhat

== C ==
- Chamarasa
- Chikkupadhyaya
- Gangadhar V. Chittal
- Chavundaraya
- Mudnakudu Chinnaswamy

== D ==
- Kanaka Dasa
- Purandara Dasa
- Dinakara Desai
- Devanur Mahadeva
- Devar Dasimayya
- Doddarangegowda

== E ==
- Subbanna Ekkundi
- S. R. Ekkundi

== G ==
- Gajaga
- Gangadevi
- D. V. Gundappa
- V. K. Gokak
- Vinayaka Krishna Gokak

== H ==
- Pha. Gu. Halakatti
- Harihara (poet)

== I ==
- Masti Venkatesha Iyengar
- M. K. Indira
- B. M. Idinabba

== J ==
- Janna
- Jayalakshmi Seethapura

== K ==
- Gourish Kaikini
- Jayant Kaikini
- Chandrashekhara Kambara
- Girish Karnad
- Shivarama Karanth
- Kuvempu
- Jayanth Kaikini
- Chennaveera Kanavi
- Shivaram Karanth
- C. P. Krishnakumar

== L ==
- Lakshmisa

== M ==
- Akka Mahadevi
- A. N. Murthy Rao
- H. S. Mukthayakka

== N ==
- Nagavarma I
- Nagavarma II
- K. S. Narasimhaswamy
- P. T. Narasimhachar
- K. V. Narayana
- Sundar V. Nadkarni
- Vijaya Narasimha
- Nanjangud Tirumalamba
- K. Y. Narayanaswamy

== P ==
- M. Govinda Pai
- Adikavi Pampa
- Sri Ponna
- Allama Prabhu
- Pandhareenathachar Galagali
- Pratibha Nandakumar
- Palakala Seetharam Bhat
- Panth Maharaj
- Chandrashekhar Patil
- Ponna (poet)
- Krishnamoorthy Puranik

== R ==
- Raghavanka
- Kayyar Kinhanna Rai
- G. P. Rajarathnam
- Ranna
- Rudrabhatta
- Ranna (Kannada poet)
- Baraguru Ramachandrappa
- M. S. Ananthapadmanabha Rao
- Ratnakaravarni

== S ==
- Sara Aboobacker
- Mamta Sagar
- Sarvajna
- Shishunala Sharif
- Shivakotiacharya
- G. S. Shivarudrappa
- B. M. Srikantaiah
- T. N. Srikantaiah
- B. G. L. Swamy
- Samsa (writer)
- H. S. Shivaprakash
- Nijaguna Shivayogi
- K. B. Siddaiah
- Siddalingaiah (poet)
- S. G. Siddaramayya
- C. P. Siddhashrama
- Siddheshwar
- Palkuriki Somanatha
- Venugopal Sorab

== T ==
- Poornachandra Tejaswi
- Tirumalamba
- H. Tipperudraswamy
- Tirumalarya
- K. V. Tirumalesh
- Triveni

== U ==
- Channappa Uttangi

== V ==
- Kumara Vyasa
- Vyasatirtha
- Vani
- H. S. Venkateshamurthy
- Kum. Veerabhadrappa
- Vaidehi
- Vijaya Dabbe
