= K. S. Nissar Ahmed =

Indian writer (1936–2020)

- Born: Kokkare Hosahalli Sheikh Haider Nissar Ahmed; 5 February 1936; Devanahalli, Kingdom of Mysore, British India
- Died: 3 May 2020 (aged 84); Bangalore, Karnataka, India
- Occupations: Writer, academic
- Spouse: Shahnawaz Begum
- Writing career
- Language: Kannada
- Genres: Poetry and Criticism
- Subject: Various Themes
- Notable works: Manasu Gandhi Bazaru, Nityotsava, Sanje Aidara Male and Manadondige Mathukathe
- Notable awards: Padma Shri; 2008; Rajyotsava Award; 1981; Pampa Award; 2017
- Movement: Navya

Kokkare Hosahalli Shekh Haider Nissar Ahmed (5 February 1936 – 3 May 2020) was an Indian poet and writer in the Kannada language. He was awarded the Padma Shri (2008), the Rajyotsava Award (1981) and the Pampa award for his work (2017). He became a household name for his work Nityotsava (Daily celebration), which is a poem about Karnataka, a piece he composed after seeing Jog falls. He has numerous poems, translations and children's books to his credit. He is known for using simple words that resonate deeply with the public in his literary work.

== Early life and education ==
Nissar Ahmed was born in Devanahalli in Bangalore rural. His father was a government employee. His family moved to Dodda Mavalli in Bangalore. He grew up in a Muslim colony which had about 500 Muslim families. His father admitted him to a Kannada medium school, with the objective of easing the path for him to secure a government job. Most of the children in the neighbourhood studied Urdu.

He was inspired by writers G. P. Rajarathnam and M. V. Seetharamiah who were his teachers at high school.

He was a post-graduate in Geology who worked as an Assistant Geologist in The Mysore Mines and Geology at Gulbarga before coming in touch with Kuvempu and was invited to the Kannada poets' meet during Dasara festival in 1959.

== Teacher ==
He worked as a lecturer in Geology in Central College, Bangalore and then in Chitradurga. Later, he taught in the Sahyadri First Grade College in Shimoga for two terms during 1967–72 and 1975–78.

== Writer ==
He is best known for Nityotsava (ನಿತ್ಯೋತ್ಸವ). The Nityotsava compilation was released in the year 1978. The Nityotsava song went on to become very famous and he eventually became a household name in Karnataka. A total of 13 albums have been published. He was the chairperson of the Karnataka Sahitya Academy between 1984 and 1987.

== Literary works ==
Poetry

- Nanna Nudi (My words) - His first poem.
- Nityotsava (Daily celebration, 1968)
- Manasu Gandhibazaru (Mind is a Gandhibazar)
- Swayam Seveya Giligalu (Parrots of Voluntarism)
- Anaamika Aanglaru (Anonymous Englishmen)
- Sanje Aidara Male (The rain at five in the evening)
- Naanemba Parakeeya (Me, the stranger)
- Nimmodaniddoo nimmantagade (To be with you, yet not be like you; 1960) - Expression of his angst about the unhealthy competition amongst Kannada poets in the 1960s. He bemoans religious and caste discrimination that prevailed.
- Kurigalu saar kurigalu (Sheep sir, Sheep; 1963)
- Raman Sathha Suddi (The demise of Raman, 1970)
- Anaataru (Orphans, 1972)
- Savatiya Makkala Hage (Like Step-Children, 1982) - An appeal to Mother India to not treat Muslims like stepchildren and ask to forgive "the misguided ones".
- Shilube Yeriddaane - (He has Ascended the Cross, 1982)
- Nenedavara Manadalli
- Kannadada Kuvari
- America, America - The poet calls out America for its superiority complex and critiques its role in impacting other nations in order to maintain such superiority.
- Manadondige Mathukathe
- Benne Kadda Namma Krishna (Our Butter stealing Krishna) - Poem in praise of the Lord Krishna.
- Rangoli Mathhu Maga (Rangoli and my son)
- Amma Matthu Burkha (My mother and The Burkha)
- Amma, Achara Mattu Naanu (Mother, Orthodoxy and I)
- Raman Matthu Naanu (C.V. Raman and I)
- Yella Maretiruvaga (When everything has been forgotten)
- Navolasa
- Sumuhurta

Poetry collections

- Manasu Gandhi Bazaaru (The heart is Gandhi Bazaar, 1960).
- Sanje Aidara Male (The rain at five in the evening, 1970).
- Naanemba Parakeeya (Me, the stranger, 1972).
- Seemateetana Sirivanta Suggi (2017) - The last work of the poet, a select collection of his poems, was released by the former Chief Minister of Karnataka Veerappa Moily in the year 2017.

Translations

- Selected Works of Shakespeare - (Merchant of Venice, King Lear and A Midsummer Night's Dream).
- Poems of Pablo Neruda

== Awards ==
- Karnataka Sahitya Akademi Award for Poetry (1982): Anaamika Aanglaru
- Rajyotsava Award (1981)
- Nadoja Award (2003)
- Padma Shri (2008)
- Kempegowda Award
- Pampa Award (2017)

== Books ==
- Ahmed K.S, Nissar (2019). Nityotsava (Hardbound). Sapna Book House. ISBN 9788128026263.
- Ahmed K.S, Nissar (2019). Acchumecchu. Sapna Book House. ISBN 9789388913003.
- Ahmed K.S, Nissar (2018). Samagra Kavihegalu (Hardbound). Sapna Book House. ISBN 9789387979222.
- Ahmed K.S, Nissar (2017). Manadondige Matukathe. Sapna Book House. ISBN 9789386381583.
- Ahmed K.S, Nissar (2017). Ayda Gadya Barahagalu (Hardbound). Sapna Book House. ISBN 9789387308169.
- Ahmed K.S, Nissar (2012). Hiriyaru Harasida Heddari. Sapna Book House. ISBN 9788128019272.
- Ahmed K.S, Nissar (2012). Vichara Vihara. Sapna Book House. ISBN 9788128019289.
- Ahmed K.S, Nissar (2012). Aravattaidara Aisiri. Sapna Book House. ISBN 9788128019470.
- Ahmed K.S, Nissar (2012). Idu Bari Bedagallo Anna. Sapna Book House. ISBN 9788128019296.

== Honours ==
Nissar Ahmed was the chairperson of 73rd Akhila Bharatha Kannada Sahitya Sammelana (All India Kannada Literary Symposium) held at Shivamogga in 2007. The 407th edition of Mysuru Dasara was inaugurated by him in 2017 atop Chamundi Hills.

He was conferred honorary doctorates by Kuvempu University, Bangalore University and Karnatak University in recognition of his work.

== Personal life ==
Nissar Ahmed was married to Shahnawaz Begum. Nissar and his wife narrowly escaped a terrorist blast in Jaipur. The couple had two sons and daughters.

== Death ==
Nissar Ahmed died on Sunday, 3 May in Bengaluru at his residence. He was aged 84 and died due to age related ailments. He was heartbroken as he had lost his wife the previous year and most recently his son in the US to cancer. His end came only 18 days after the demise of his son. He died at his residence in Padmanabhanagar peacefully.

== See also ==
- Kannada literature
- Kannada poetry
- Vellala Sathyam
- Venugopal Sorab
- Kuvempu
