= Javaregowda =

Indian Kannada writer, folklorist, scholar

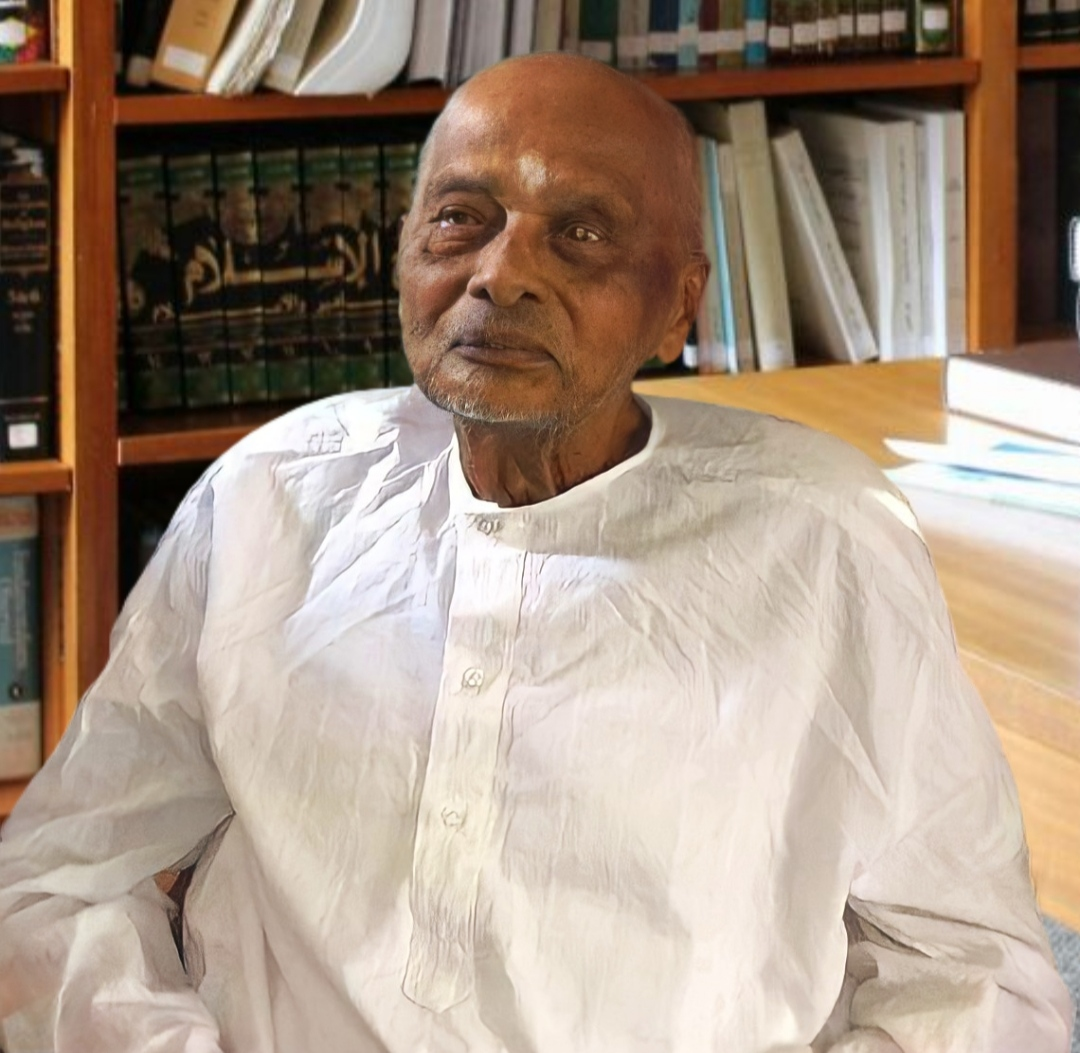
- Born: Devegowda Javaregowda; 6 July 1915; Chakkere
- Died: 30 May 2016 (aged 100); Mysore, Karnataka, India
- Occupations: Author, professor, vice chancellor
- Writing career
- Pen name: De Ja Gau
- Notable awards: Pampa Prashasti (1998); Padma Shri (2001); Karnataka Ratna (2008)

Devegowda Javaregowda (6 July 1915 – 30 May 2016), known as De Ja Gou or simply Javaregowda, was an Indian Kannada writer, folklorist, researcher, scholar and academic. He was disciple of authors T.N. Srikantaiah and Kuvempu. His literary career spans over decades in which he wrote over thirty-four biographies in Kannada language and other works including children's literature. He campaigned for the promotion of Kannada language. He had received Pampa Prashasti (1998), Padma Shri (2001) and the Karnataka Ratna (2008) awards for his contributions in literature and education. He became a centenarian in 2015 and died on 30 May 2016.

== Early life ==
Gowda was born in a Vokkaliga family on 6 July 1915 in the village called Chakkere in the Channapatna taluk of Ramanagara district in Karnataka state. He was born in a poor family and had three siblings. As his parents could not afford to educate all, only his eldest brother went to school and Gowda would graze goats. Having passion for education, Gowda would let go goats on their own and instead come and listen to teachers from outside near a school window. He recollects that on one such day when the goats entered a wealthy landlord's farm and destroyed the crop, his father beat him and the school principal then rescued him and admitted him in third standard, also providing him with uniform and books.

== Education, career and activities ==
Gowda later went on to study in Bangalore for intermediate classes and completed his BA in Mysore. He wanted to do his BA with History as his major subject but opted for Kannada when he came to know that notable author Kuvempu would be teaching it. Gowda had admired Kuvempu's works long before getting associated with him as his student. After completing BA in 1941, he went on to do post graduates MA in Kannada. With little scope of getting a lectureship in any college, he took up a clerical job at the Secretariat in Vidhan Soudha at Bangalore. He concurrently studied law but did not pursue it as career when he got post of Kannada lecturer at the Central College, Bangalore. After three years, he went on to teach at Maharaja's College, Mysore. Here, he again was associated with Kuvempu and later credited him for his "academic and spiritual enrichment".

Gowda served as the Vice Chancellor of Mysore University from 1969 to 1975 for consecutive two terms. In his tenure as VC he started various post graduates courses in Home Sciences, Criminology, Law and Journalism at the university. He was known for his sharp criticism of the then government policies. While reappointing him as the VC for the second term, the then state governor Mohan Lal Sukhadia requested "please try to remember that when you criticize the government, do so mildly". He also wished to start an Afro-Dravidian Institute of post graduate studies called "The Kuvempu Vidyavardhaka Trust", which did not happen because of inadequate government funding.

Gowda actively campaigned for promotion of Kannada language. Various encyclopaedias were published in Kannada after his efforts. Kannada was also used in examinations conducted by Karnataka Public Service Commission. He wrote over thirty-four biographies in Kannada language of eminent personalities like Dr. Babasaheb Ambedkar, Ram Manohar Lohia, Motilal Nehru, Basaveshwara and more. He also wrote books for children on Albert Einstein, Jawaharlal Nehru, Rabindranath Tagore, Marie Curie and more. He published various books on Kuvempu and Soundarya Yogi Kuvempu narrates Gowda's experiences with Kuvempu. In 1970 he chaired the Akhila Bharata Kannada Sahitya Sammelana which was held at Bangalore.

On 31 January 2006, the death anniversary of Mahatma Gandhi, Gowda observed a dawn-to-dusk fast seeking classical language status for Kannada. Earlier he had fasted once before for same cause and also threatened to return his Padma Shri that was conferred on him in 2001. Eventually he did not return the award as he was hopeful of a favourable reply from the then President A. P. J. Abdul Kalam. In 2014, ex-minister P. G. R. Sindhia requested government to confer upon him the title of poet laureate (Rashtrakavi) for his contributions to the Kannada language.

In October 2015, Gowda and five others returned the Aralu Sahitya prize, awarded to them by the Kannada Sahitya Parishat and Bangalore Metropolitan Transport Corporation in 2011, to protest the perceived delays into the investigation of writer M. M. Kalburgi's death.

== Personal life and death ==
Gowda was married to Savithramma. Their son J. Shashidhar Prasad was also Vice Chancellor of University of Mysore. Gowda became a centenarian in 2015. In a felicitation program organized by Kannada Catholic Christian Association on the occasion, he mentioned that he had been worshipping Jesus Christ for past 25 years along with all the Hindu Gods. He died in Mysore on 30 May 2016 from heart failure at the Sri Jayadeva Institute of Cardiovascular Sciences and Research where he was admitted on 28 May. His last rites were performed at the Kuvempu Trust, Mysore. His body was laid in repose at his residence in Jayalakshmipuram and at the Chandrakala Hospital. Politicians and writers like H. D. Deve Gowda, H. D. Kumaraswamy, S. M. Krishna and M. Veerappa Moily paid tributes to him.

== Awards and accolades ==
Gowda received his first doctorate in 1975 from the Karnatak University, Dharwad. In 1998, he received doctorate from Mysore University and in 2006 an honorary doctorate was accorded to him by the Kuvempu University at Shimoga. He also received Nadoja Award conferred by the Hampi University. On his centenary, a 30-minutes documentary was made by director Kesari Harvoo for the Department of Kannada and Culture.

- Pampa Prashasti in 1998
- Padma Shri in 2001
- Gorur Award in 2003
- Sandesh Award in 2004
- Karnataka Ratna in 2008

== See also ==
- Kannada literature
- G. S. Paramashivaiah
- C. P. Krishnakumar
- C. P. Siddhashrama
