= Asaga =

9th-century Indian Jain poet

- Born: c. 800 CE
- Occupation: poet
- Writing career
- Period: Rashtrakuta literature
- Genre: Jain literature
- Notable works: Vardhaman Charitra (Sanskrit, c. 853); Karnataka Kumarasambhava Kavya (Kannada, about c.850)

Asaga, was a 9th-century Digambara Jain poet who wrote in Sanskrit and Kannada language. He is most known for his extant work in Sanskrit, the Vardhamana Charitra (Life of Vardhamana). This epic poem which runs into eighteen cantos was written in 853 CE. It is the earliest available Sanskrit biography of the last tirthankara of Jainism, Mahavira. In all, he authored at least eight works in Sanskrit. In Kannada, none of his writings, including the Karnataka Kumarasambhava Kavya (an adaptation of Kalidas's epic poem Kumārasambhava) that have been referenced by latter day poets (including Nagavarma II who seems to provide a few quotations from the epic poem in his Kavyavalokana) have survived.

His writings are known to have influenced Kannada poet Sri Ponna, the famous court poet of Rashtrakuta King Krishna III, and other writers who wrote on the lives of Jain Tirthankaras. Kesiraja, (authored Shabdamanidarpana in c. 1260 CE), a Kannada grammarian cites Asaga as an authoritative writer of his time and places him along with other masters of early Kannada poetry.

== Biography ==
Kannada poets and writers in the Rashtrakuta Empire (753–973 CE)
Amoghavarsha	850
Sri vijaya	850
Asaga	850
Shivakotiacharya	900
Ravinagabhatta	930
Pushpadanta	939
Adikavi Pampa	941
Jainachandra	950
Sri Ponna	950
Kavi Rajaraja	9th-10th c.
Gajanakusha	10th century
Earlier Kannada poets and writers praised in Kavirajamarga
Durvinita	6th century
Vimalachandra	Pre-850
Nagarjuna	Pre-850
Jayabodhi	Pre-850
Udaya	Pre-850
Kavisvara	Pre-850
Pandita Chandra	Pre-850
Lokapala	Pre-850

Asaga's name is considered an apbramsha form of the Sanskrit name Aśoka or Asanga. A contemporary of Rashtrakuta King Amoghavarsha I (800–878 CE), Asaga lived in modern Karnataka and made important contributions to the corpus of Rashtrakuta literature created during their rule in southern and central India between the 8th and 10th centuries. Like Kannada writer Gunavarma, Asaga earned fame despite having received no direct royal patronage.

In his Vardhamacharita, Asaga mentions writing eight classics though the only one other work has survived, the Shanti purana in Sanskrit. Asaga claims to have composed his writings in the city of Virala (Dharala), Coda Visaya ("Cola desa" or Coda lands), in the Kingdom of King Srinatha, who was perhaps a Rashtrakuta vassal. In Kaviprasastipradyani, the epilogue to the Shanti purana, Asaga claims he was born to Jain parents and names his three Jain teachers, including Bhavakirti.

Much of what is known about Asaga has come down from references to his works made by later-day writers and poets. Kannada poet Sri Ponna (c. 950), who used one of his narrative poems as a source, claims to be superior to Asaga. Asaga's writings have been praised by later-day poets and writers, such as Kannada writer Jayakirti (Chchandanuphasana), who mentions Asaga's Karnataka Kumarasambhava Kavya. Several of its verses have been quoted by later authors of Kannada literature such as Durgasimha, Nayasena and Jayakirti (a Kannada language theorist of the early 11th century) who refer to Asaga as the best writer of desi Kannada, which may be considered as "traditional" or "provincial" form of the language. The Indologist A. K. Warder considers this unique because Asaga was also famous for classical Sanskrit. The 11th century Kannada grammarian Nagavarma II claimed Asaga to be an equal to Sri Ponna, and 12th century Kannada writer Brahmashiva refers to Asaga as Rajaka, a honorific that means "one among the greats" of Kannada literature. His writings appear to have been popular among later Kannada writers up to the decline of the Vijayanagara Empire in the 16th century. Though his Kannada writings are deemed lost, his name is counted among noted poets of Kannada literature from that period, along with the likes of Gajaga, Aggala, Manasija, Srivardhadheva and Gunanandi. The 10th century Apabhramsha poet Dhaval praised Asaga's writing Harivamsa-purana.

== Works ==
- Asaga; Pannalala Jaina (1974). Vardhamānacaritam: Hindi anuvada (Hindi translation), ālocanātmaka prastāvanā (Critical Review), ādi sahita. Jain Sanskriti Samraksha Sangha.
- Śāntipurāṇa

== See also ==
- Rashtrakuta literature
- Extinct Kannada literature

== Bibliography ==
- Asaga. Vardhamānacarita, ed. P. Jain, Sholapur, 1974.
