= Western Ganga society =

Society of ruling dynasty of ancient Karnataka

The Western Ganga Dynasty (350 – 1000 CE) (Kannada: ಪಶ್ಚಿಮ ಗಂಗ ಸಂಸ್ಥಾನ) were an important ruling dynasty of ancient Karnataka. They are known as Western Gangas to distinguish them from the Eastern Gangas who in later centuries ruled over modern Orissa. The Western Gangas ruled as a sovereign power from the middle of fourth century to middle of sixth century, initially from Kolar, later moving their capital to Talakad on the banks of the Kaveri River in modern Mysore district. Though territorially a small kingdom, the Western Ganga contribution to polity, culture, society and literature of the modern south Karnataka region is considered noteworthy.

== Society ==
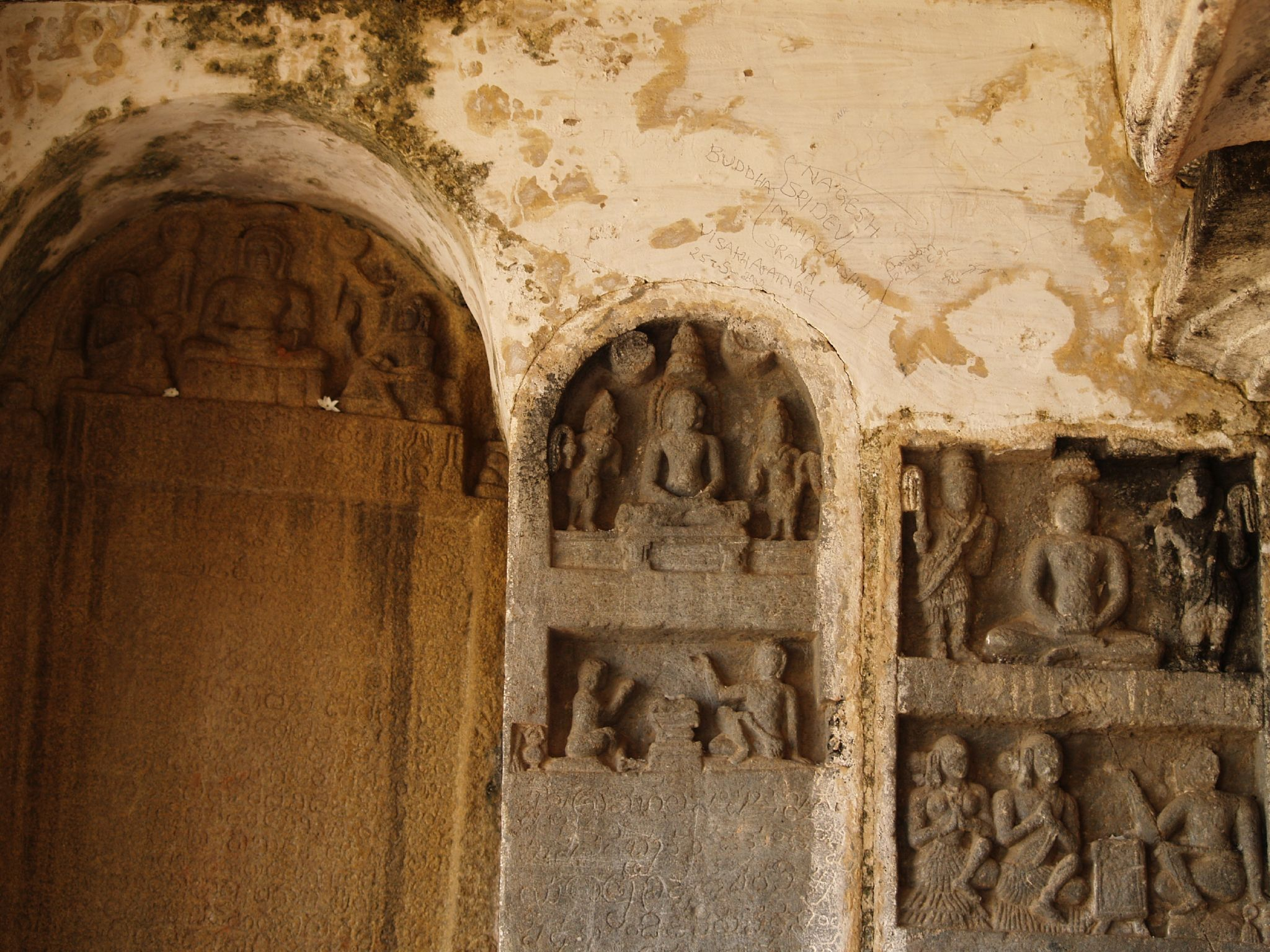
wall relief sculpture at Shravanabelagola

The society in the Western Ganga kingdom evolved during a time when many devotional movements were popularised, the local vernacular became important and the life of women was vastly changed from one that was domesticated to one of greater degree of emancipation and responsibility. Inscriptional evidence proves women became active in local administration. It is known that Ganga kings distributed territorial responsibility to princes and their queens, an example being feudal queen Parabbaya-arasi of Kundattur, the queen of King Sripurusha, Butuga II and Permadi all shared government responsibilities with their respective kings. Inheritance of fiscal and administrative responsibility by women is also evident. A position of nalgavunda (local landlord) which had been bestowed upon Jakkiabbe, the wife of a fallen hero was later passed on to her daughter when Jakkiabbe took to asceticism.

It was a common practice for the son-in-law of the family to inherit administrative responsibility upon the demise of an incumbent without sons, an example is the prime ministerial position under King Ereganga II that was inherited by the son-in-law of the previous incumbent. The devadasi system (sule or courtesan) in temples was prevalent and was modelled after the structures in the royal palace. This information comes from contemporaneous literature such a Vaddaradhane which makes a mention of the chief queen (Dharani Mahadevi) accompanied by lower ranking queens (arasiyargal) and courtesans of the women's quarter (pendarasada suleyargal). Courtesans and concubines were employed in the harem of the kings and chieftains. Inscriptions attest that some of them were well respected, examples being Nandavva at whose instance a local chief made land grant to a Jain temple, Jogabbe and Birakka. The courtesans of the royal family were meant for the pleasure of kings and those of the royal court were meant for the entertainment of the courtiers. Distinction between principle queens, lawfully wedded wives and inmates of the harem was clear. Kings were entertained at the bath by women who sang, played musical instruments and bathed with him or bathed while he watched. The one who pleased him the most was sent to the royal chambers later for the kings pleasure. No two women of the harem lived in the same quarters and beautiful girls were often purchased to make additions to the harem.

The devadasi system in temples was very popular of who there were two types; the angabhoga who had responsibilities closely related to and including bathing of the deity, daily worship, offering daily food (naivedya), betel leaf and areca nut to the deity while the rangabhoga was mainly concerned with the dance hall where she performed during special functions. On account of her close affiliation with the sanctum of the temple, the angabhoga devadasi was held in higher esteem than the rangabhoga. Education in the royal family was closely supervised and included such subjects as political science, elephant and horse riding, archery, medicine, poetry, grammar, drama, literature, dance, singing and use of musical instruments. Brahmins enjoyed a high position in society and were exempt from certain taxes and customs due on land on the condition they carry out or manage public affairs such as teaching and local judiciary. Also known as Mahajans, Brahmins performed other functions; as trustees and bankers, in management of school, temples, tanks, rest houses, collection of taxes due from villages and raising monies from public subscriptions, making them influential with those in higher command. By virtue of a Hindu belief that killing of a Brahmin (Bramhatya) was a sin, capital punishment was not applicable to them. Alternately, severe crimes committed by a Brahmin was punishable by the severing of a foot or hand.

Upper caste kshatriyas performed religious sacrifices, studied the Vedas, followed the puranic beliefs and like Brahmins were exempt from capital punishment. Contemporary literary sources reveal up to ten castes in the Hindu caste system; three of kshatriya, three types of Brahmin, two among vaishya and two among shudras. Family laws permitted the wife and daughter or surviving relatives to claim property such as home, land, grain, money etc., if the deceased had no male heirs. If no claimants to the property existed, the state took possession of the same calling it Dharmadeya assets (charitable assets) Brahmins began using such surnames as "Dvivedi", "Upadhyaya", "Dikshit", "Pandvta", "Prasanna Sarawati" etc., during this time. Intercaste marriage, child marriage, marriage of boys to maternal uncles daughter, Svayamvara marriage (where the bride garlands her choice of a groom from among many aspirants) were all in vogue.

The system of purdah was unknown and women had the freedom to visit markets at their will. The Chinese traveller Yuan Chwang who visited in the 7th century wrote, "The inhabitants are proud, spirited, war like, grateful for favours, vengeful in wars, self sacrificing towards supplicants in distress, sanguinary to death with anyone who treated them insultingly. There war elephants go to battle intoxicated and people are fond of learning". The practice of erecting hero stones (virkal) for fallen heroes was common and sometimes families received monetary aid for maintenance of these memorials. The presence of numerous Mahasatikals (or Mastikal - hero stones for a woman who accepted ritual death upon the demise of her husband) attests to its popularity among royalty. Ritual death by sallekhana, by Jalasamadhi (drowning in water) are also known.

Popular among men was the use of two unrestricted garments, a Dhoti as a lower garment and a plain cloth as upper garment while women wore Saris with stitched petticoats. Turbans were popular with men of higher standing and people used umbrellas made with bamboo or reeds. Ornamentation was common among men and women, even elephants and horses were decorated. Men wore finger rings, necklaces (honnasara and honnagala sara), bracelets (Kaduga) and wristlets (Kaftkina). Women wore a nose jewel (bottu), nose ring (mugutti), bangles (bale or kankana) and various types of necklaces (honna gante sara and kati sutra). During leisure, men amused themselves with horse riding, watching wrestling bouts, cock fights, ram fights and duel between animals of different species.
