= Kirtinath Kurtakoti =

Indian literary critic in Kannada

Kirtinath Kurtakoti (13 October 1928 – 31 July 2003) was a Kannada writer and critic who won among other awards, the Central Sahitya Akademi honour of India. Apart from Kannada, he was well-versed in other languages including Hindi and Sanskrit.

== Early life ==
Kurtakoti was born in the town of Gadag in the Indian state of Karnataka on 13 October 1928. He completed his graduation in Bachelor of Arts from Karnataka College in Dharwad and served as a teacher in few colleges, before moving to the town of Anand in Gujarat. He completed his post-graduation in English and was employed at the Sardar Patel University in Gujarat. He married Saraswati.

== Contribution ==
His most prominent Kannada work is Marathi Samskruti - Kelavu Samasyegalu (Marathi Culture - Some Problems) which was originally written in Marathi by Sham. Bha. Joshi. This won him the Karnataka Sahitya Akademi award. Kannada Book Authority (KBA) allegedly included this translated version in a publication that it brought out, without taking the permission of Kurtakoti, forcing him to send a legal notice to KBA. He won the central Sahitya Akademi Award in 1995 for his book Uriya Nalage. Other books include Chandragupta, Bhringada Benneri, Nadedu Banda Daari and Putta Bangara. He has also written plays like Aa Mani, which have been staged by troupes like Ninasam. His book Nadedu Banda Daari (Path Traversed) is a treatise on the achievement of Kannada literature from the past to the present, while his book Bhringada Benneri provides an overview of the poems of D. R. Bendre.

== Later life ==
He spent his retired life at Dharwad. He held certain positions like that of an adviser to Manohara Granthamele, a publishing house and was also nominated to the Jnanpith language panel. He was also a member of the syndicate of the Kannada University at Hampi. On 31 July 2003, aged 75, he died of cardiac arrest, just about three hours after his wife's death.

== Works ==
- Uriya Nalage
- Marathi Samskruti-Kelavu Samasyegalu
- Yugadharma mattu Sahitya Darshana
- Nadedu Banda Daari
- Bhringada Benneri
- Chandragupta
- Pratyabhijnana
- Adhyayana mattu Parayana
- Putta Bangara
- Rajakeeya mattu Dharma
- Arthantara
- Aa Mani

== See also ==
- L. S. Sheshagiri Rao
- D. R. Nagaraj
- Vijaya Dabbe
- C. P. Siddhashrama
