= Pampa Award =

Indian Kannada literary award

Pampa Prashasti ಪಂಪ ಪ್ರಶಸ್ತಿ
- Highest literary award for contributions to Kannada literature
- Awarded for: Highest literary award of Karnataka
- Sponsored by: Government of Karnataka
- Rewards: ₹1 lakh (1987–2007) ₹3 lakh (2008–present) Present - 5 lakh
- First award: 1987
- Final award: 2025

Highlights
- Total awarded: 37
- First winner: Kuvempu
- Last winner: Devanur Mahadeva

The Pampa Award (or Pampa Prashasti) is a literary award in the Indian state of Karnataka. The award was established in 1987 by the government of Karnataka. It is the highest literary honor conferred by the Department of Kannada and Culture, Government of Karnataka State, and recognises works written in the Kannada language (one of the 22 official languages of India).

The award is named after the first Kannada poet Adikavi Pampa. The award originally comprised a cash prize of ₹1 lakh (US$1,100), a shawl, a citation and a memento. The cash prize was increased to ₹3 lakh (US$3,200) in 2008. Prior to 1996, the awards were given for a best single work by a Kannada writer. Since then, the award has been given to writers for their lifetime contribution to the Kannada literature. The Pampa Prashasti is presented by the Chief Minister, during the Kadambotsava, a cultural festival held annually in Pampa's hometown of Banavasi in Uttara Kannada district.

Since its inception in 1987, the award has been given to a more than 30 individuals. Kuvempu was the first recipient of the award who was honored for his work Sri Ramayana Darshanam (1949), a modern rendition of the Indian epic Ramayana. In 2015, Chandrashekhar Patil returned his award as a sign of protest against the assassination of the scholar M. M. Kalburgi. 2025's award is announced for famous writer Devanur Mahadeva.

== Recipients ==
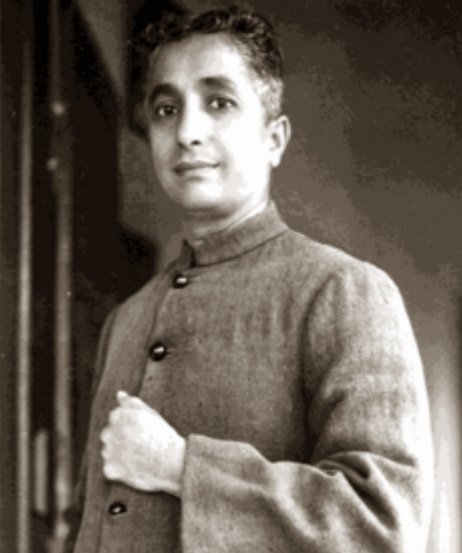
Kuvempu was the first recipient of the award.

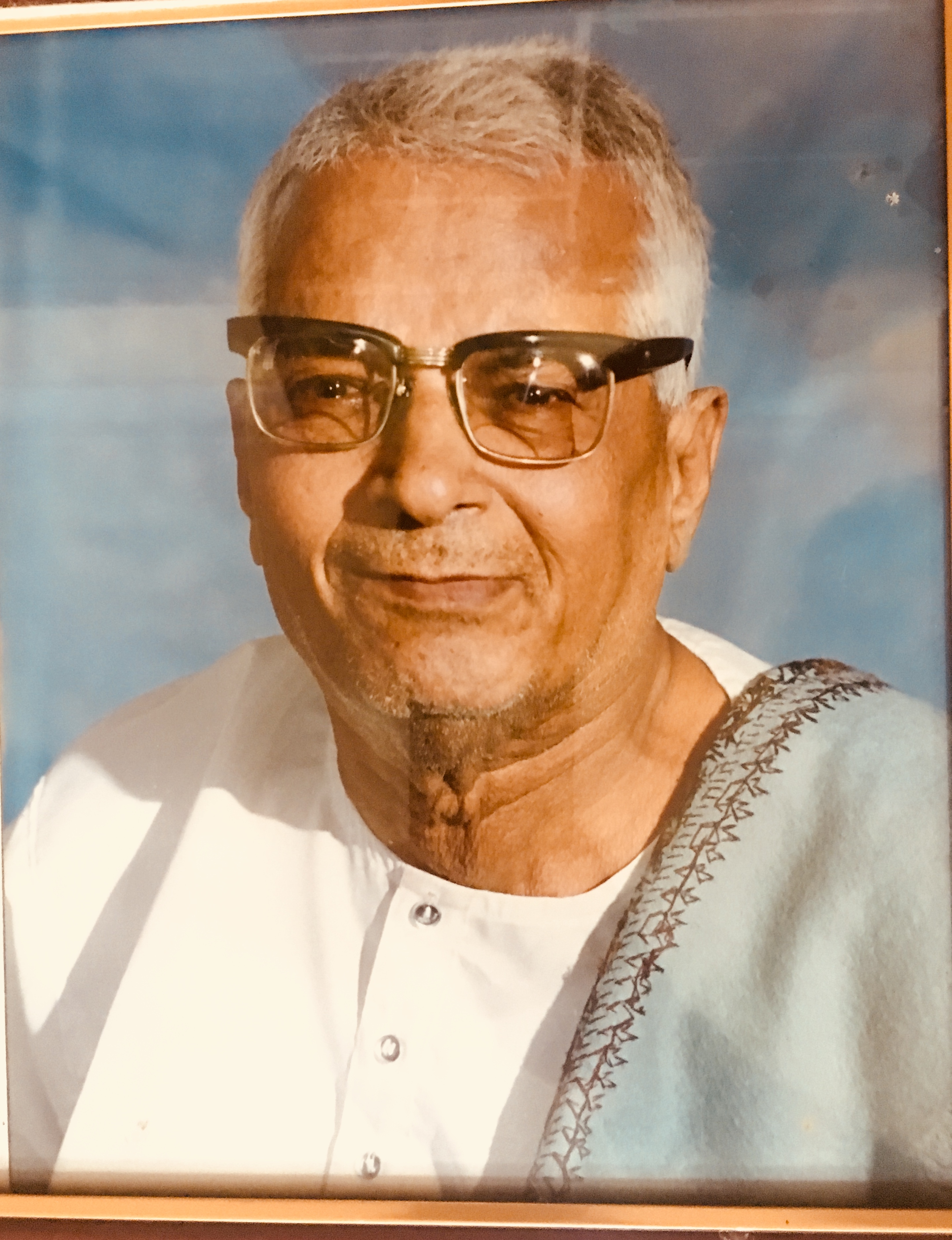
K S Narasimhaswamy was given the award in 1995.

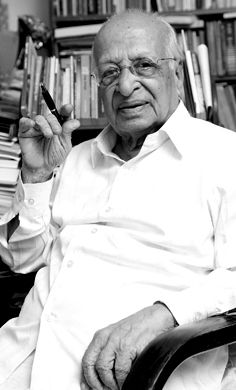
G.Venkatasubbayya awarded in 2014

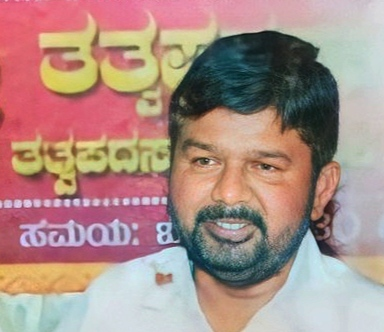
Dr. Siddalingaiah, the recent awardee, received in 2019

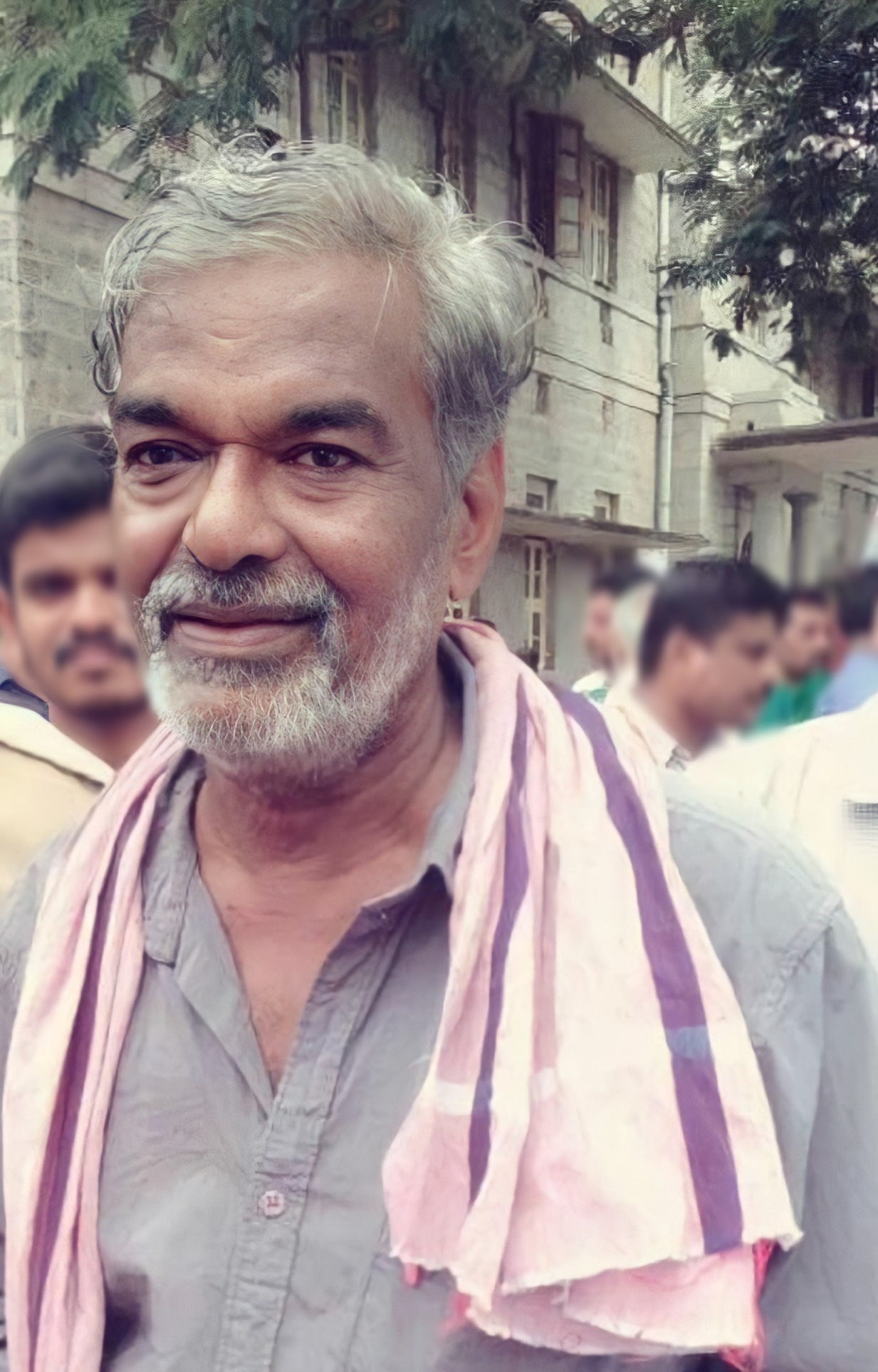
Devanura Mahadeva selected for the year 2025

Year	Writer	Work	Ref.
1987	Kuvempu	Sri Ramayana Darshanam	
1988	T. N. Srikantaiah	Bharathiya Kavya Meemaamse	
1989	K. Shivaram Karanth	Mai Managala Sulliyali	
1990	S. S. Bhoosnurmath	Shoonya Sampadaneya Paramarshe	
1991	P. T. Narasimhachar	Shri Haricharitha	
1992	A. N. Murthy Rao	Devaru	
1993	Gopalakrishna Adiga	Suvarna Puthalli	
1994	Sediyapu Krishna Bhatta	Vichara Prapancha	
1995	K. S. Narasimhaswamy	Dundu Mallige	
1996	M. M. Kalburgi	Lifetime contribution	
1997	G. S. Shivarudrappa	Lifetime contribution	
1998	Javare Gowda	Lifetime contribution	
1999	Chennaveera Kanavi	Lifetime contribution	
2000	L. Basavaraju	Lifetime contribution	
2001	Poornachandra Tejaswi	Lifetime contribution	
2002	M. Chidananda Murthy	Lifetime contribution	
2003	Chandrashekhara Kambara	Lifetime contribution	
2004	H. L. Nage Gowda	Lifetime contribution	
2005	S. L. Bhyrappa	Lifetime contribution	
2006	G. S. Amur	Lifetime contribution	
2007	Yashwant V. Chittal	Lifetime contribution	
2008	T. V. Venkatachala Sastry	Lifetime contribution	
2009	Chandrashekhar Patil	Lifetime contribution	
2010	Govindray H. Nayak	Lifetime contribution	
2011	Baraguru Ramachandrappa	Lifetime contribution	
2012	D. N. Shankara Bhat	Lifetime contribution	
2013	Kayyar Kinhanna Rai	Lifetime contribution	
2014	G. Venkatasubbiah	Kannada lexicography	
2015	B. A. Sanadi	Lifetime contribution	
2016	Hampanā	Lifetime contribution	
2017	K. S. Nissar Ahmed	Lifetime contribution	
2018	S. Shettar	Lifetime contribution	
2019	Siddalingaiah	Lifetime contribution	
2020	C. P. Krishnakumar	Lifetime contribution	
2021	S.R.Ramaswamy	Lifetime contribution	
2022	Babu Krishnamurthy	Lifetime contribution	
2023	Na D'Souza	Lifetime contribution	
2024	B.A. Vivek Rai	Lifetime contribution	
2025	Devanur Mahadeva	Lifetime contribution	
