= Rashtrakuta literature =

Historic body of South Indian literature

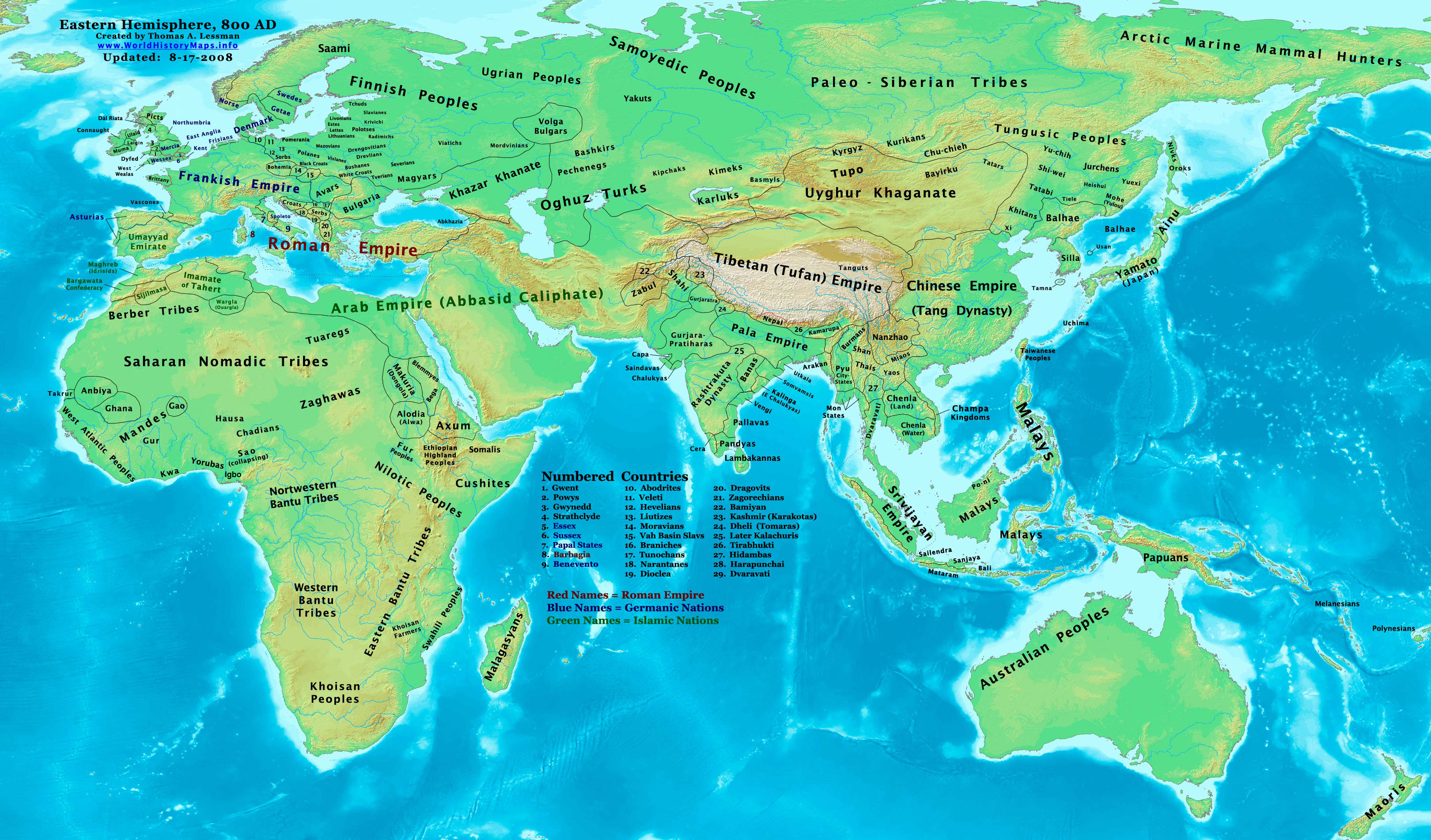
Rashtrakuta Territories (India), 800 CE

Rashtrakuta literature (Kannada: ರಾಷ್ಟ್ರಕೂಟ ಸಾಹಿತ್ಯ Rāṣṭrakūṭa Sāhitya) is the body of work created during the rule of the Rastrakutas of Manyakheta, a dynasty that ruled the southern and central parts of the Deccan, India between the 8th and 10th centuries. The period of their rule was an important time in the history of South Indian literature in general and Kannada literature in particular. This era was practically the end of classical Prakrit and Sanskrit writings when a whole wealth of topics were available to be written in Kannada. Some of Kannada's most famous poets graced the courts of the Rashtrakuta kings. Court poets and royalty created eminent works in Kannada and Sanskrit, that spanned such literary forms as prose, poetry, rhetoric, epics and grammar. Famous scholars even wrote on secular subjects such as mathematics. Rashtrakuta inscriptions were also written in expressive and poetic Kannada and Sanskrit, rather than plain documentary prose.

== Kannada writings ==
Kannada poets and writers in the Rashtrakuta Empire (753–973 CE)
Amoghavarsha	850
Sri vijaya	850
Asaga	850
Shivakotiacharya	900
Ravinagabhatta	930
Pushpadanta	939
Adikavi Pampa	941
Jainachandra	950
Sri Ponna	950
Kavi Rajaraja	9th-10th c.
Gajanakusha	10th century
Earlier Kannada poets and writers praised in Kavirajamarga
Durvinita	6th century
Vimalachandra	Pre-850
Nagarjuna	Pre-850
Jayabodhi	Pre-850
Udaya	Pre-850
Kavisvara	Pre-850
Pandita Chandra	Pre-850
Lokapala	Pre-850

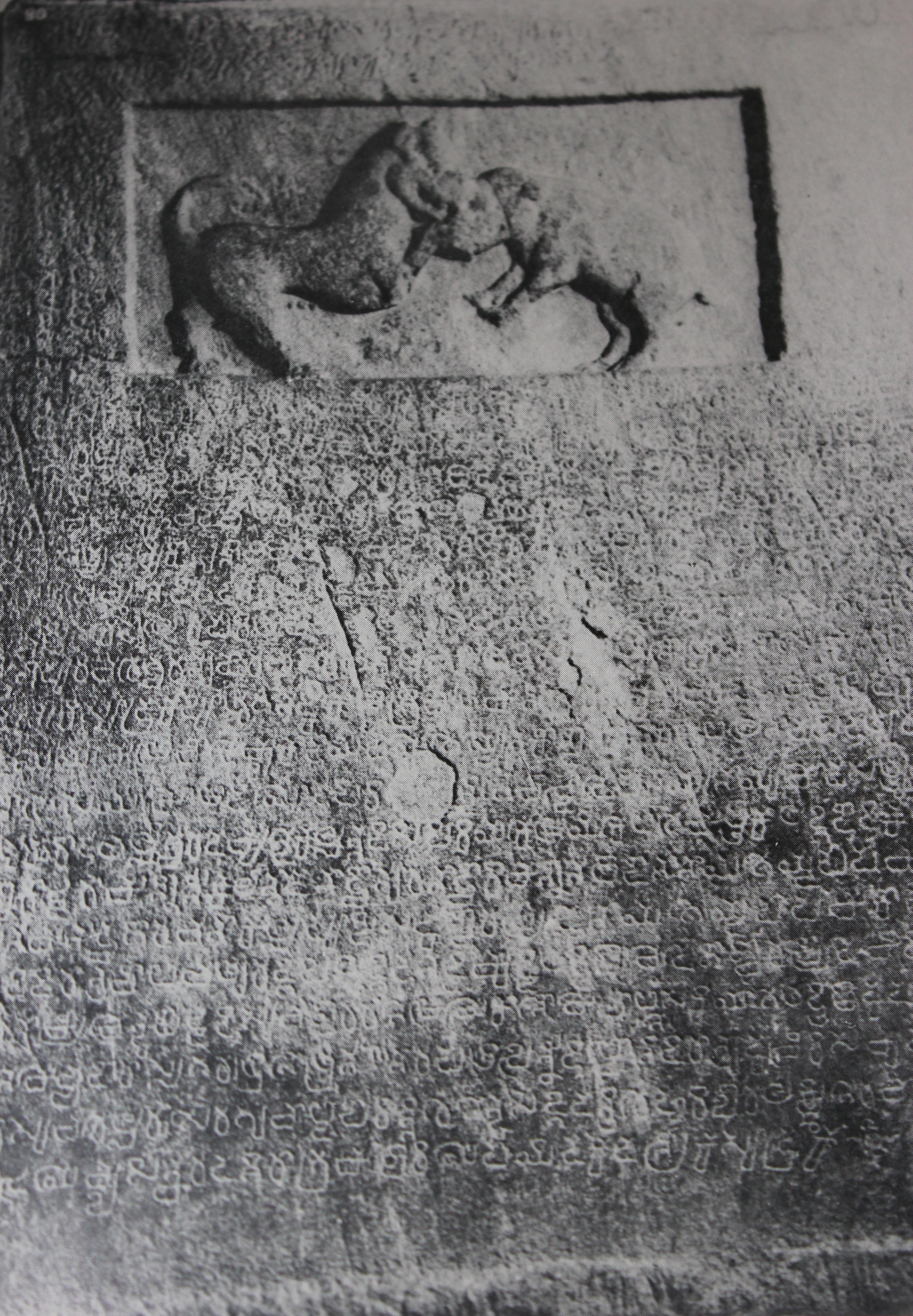
The famous Atakur inscription (949 C.E.), a classical Kannada composition from the Rashtrakuta-Western Ganga period, describes the death of a hound Kali fighting a boar, and the victory of King Krishna III over the Chola dynasty of Tanjore in the famous battle of Takkolam

Kavirajamarga (850) by King Amoghavarsha I and his court poet Srivijaya is the earliest extant book on rhetoric and poetics but it is evident from this book that several styles of Kannada literature and poetry had already existed in previous centuries. Kavirajamarga is a guide to poets (Kavishiksha) that aims to standardize these various styles. The book references early Kannada writers such as the 6th century Western Ganga Dynasty King Durvinita, an early writer of Kannada prose.

Adikavi Pampa, widely regarded as one of the greatest Kannada writers, became famous for Adipurana (941). Written in champu style, it is the life history of the first Jain thirtankara Rishabhadeva. In this unique work of spiritual heroism, the soul moves through a series of births before attaining emancipation. The quest in this spiritual saga, as in many others, is the liberation of the soul from the cycle of life and death. Pampa's other classic Vikramarjuna Vijaya (or Pampa Bharata, 941), is the author's version of the Hindu epic the Mahabharata. The story differs from other earlier versions of the epic in that Arjuna alone is the hero, not the other Pandava brothers, and Draupadi is solely Arjuna's wife. The author underplays the role of the Hindu god Krishna and favourably compares his patron king Chalukya Arikesari (a Rashtrakuta feudatory) to Arjuna, while casting a lofty and noble image of Karna and the Kaurava prince Duryodhana. Pampa demonstrates such a command of classical Kannada that scholars over the centuries have written many interpretations of his work.

Another great writer in Kannada was Ponna, patronised by King Krishna III and famed for his description of the life of the 16th Jain tirthankara Shantinatha entitled Santipurana. He earned the title Ubhaya Kavichakravathi (supreme poet in two languages) for his command over both Kannada and Sanskrit. His other writings in Kannada were Bhuvanaika-karamabhyudaya, Jinaksaramale and Gatapratiagata. Adikavi Pampa, Sri Ponna and Ranna (court poet of Western Chalukya King Tailapa II) are called the "three gems" of Kannada literature.

The earliest extant prose work in Kannada is Vaddaradhane (c. 900) by Shivakotiacharya. The title means "worship of elders". The writing contains 19 stories mostly borrowed from the Sanskrit book Brihatkatha-Kosha and is about Jain tenets. The writing describes issues such as rebirth, Karma, plight of humans on earth, social issues of the time such as education, trade and commerce, magic, superstitions and condition of women in society. Other well-known writers from this era were Rudrabhatta of Banahatti, Ravinagabhatta who was patronised by King Govinda IV, Kavi Rajaraja who wrote the Kalasa record, Gajanakusha (also known as Gajaga or Narayana) who wrote on erotics and was a minister in the court of King Krishna III.

A contemporary of Amoghavarsha I was the bilingual (Sanskrit and Kannada) Digambara Jain poet Asaga (or Asoka), who is known to have written in Kannada, the Karnatakumarasambhava Kavya and the Varadhamana Purana. These writings, which are not extant now, have been praised by later day poets such as Jayakirthi, and grammarian Kesiraja, (author of Shabdamanidarpana in c.1260 C.E), who cite Asaga as an authoritative writer of his time and place him along with other masters of early Kannada poetry.

Sri Vijaya, court poet of Amoghavarsha I, wrote Chandraprabha-purana in the early 9th century. Though this work is now extinct, the author and the writing have been praised by Chalukya minister Durgasimha (c. 1025). Jinachandra, who is referred to by Sri Ponna as the author of Pujyapada Charita, had earned the honorific "modern Samantha Bhadra". This classic is considered extinct.

The inscriptions of the Rashtrakutas show a remarkable change, moving away from the purely documentary Kannada prose of the previous centuries to a more expressive language suffused with literary characteristics. The Mavalli inscription by King Govinda III (c. 793 - 814); the Shiruru inscription by Amoghavarsha I (c. 814 - 878); the Gangadharam inscription written by poet Jinavallabha which gives us an account of the life of his elder brother and poet Adikavi Pampa; the Kalasa inscription (c. 930) of Govinda IV which contains various metrical forms; the Athakuru inscription (or Atakuru, Athaguru, c. 949 - 950) from the reign of King Krishna III - a unique hero stone that eulogises the valor of a dog called Kali that died fighting a wild boar; the Shishuvinahalli and Kalasa inscriptions; and the Jura (Jabalpur) inscription of King Krishna III (c. 964) which describes his military success serve as good examples of classical Kannada composition styles popular during that time.

== Sanskrit writings ==
Many enduring works on religion and secular subjects were written in Sanskrit. In mathematics, ground breaking theories on Algebra, Arithmetic and Geometry were postulated by Mahaviracharya, a native of Gulbarga who belonged to the Karnataka mathematical tradition. He was patronised by King Amoghavarsha I. His greatest contribution was Ganitasarasangraha, a writing in 9 chapters that defined important axioms. These axioms state that a proper fraction is a sum of improper fractions, a negative number is not a square number and hence does not have a square root. He also defined formulae to calculate the sum of complex progressions and a measurement unit for the size of an atom. His other works are Chattisa Ganitha, a voluminous work that contains 9,000 Granthas (manuscripts) pertaining to mathematical collection. The Shlokas (verses) are in Sanskrit and the commentary is in Kannada language. His other writings are Shatrinshika and Jyotish Patal.

Trivikrama Bhatta was a noted scholar in the court of King Indra III. His classics were Nalachampu (915), the earliest in champu style in Sanskrit, Damayanti Katha, Madalasachampu and Begumra plates. Legend has it that Goddess Saraswati helped him in his effort to compete with a rival in the king's court. Jinasena was the spiritual preceptor and guru of Amoghavarsha I. A theologian, his contributions are Dhavala and Jayadhavala (written with another theologian Virasena). These writings are named after their patron king who was also called Athishayadhavala. Other contributions from Jinasena were Adipurana (later completed by his disciple Gunabhadracharya who also wrote Atmanushasana), Harivamsha and Parshvabhyudaya. Halayudha patronised by King Krishna III wrote Kavirahasya, a list of verbs with their meanings written in verse and a work on prosody called Mritasanjivini.

Somadevasuri of 950 wrote in the court of Arikesari II, a feudatory of Rashtrakuta Krishna III in Vemulavada. He was the author of Yasastilaka champu, Nitivakyamrita and other writings. The main aim of the champu writing was to propagate Jain tenets and ethics. Yasastilaka describes different types of foods consumed by various classes of people in the Rashtrakuta empire. The second writing reviews the subject matter of Arthashastra from the standpoint of Jain morals in a clear and pithy manner. Well-known Advaita philosophers from present day Karnataka region were Padmapada and Sureshvara (also known as Visvarupa) who wrote commentaries such as Balakrida upholding the Advaita beliefs. Pushpadanta who was patronised by a minister of King Krishna III wrote Mahapurana, Nagakumara charita and Yashodhara charita. King Amoghavarsha I himself a noted poet wrote Prashnottara Ratnamalika, a book of high value on religion, later translated into Tibetian language. Other well-known scholars were logicians such as Manikyanandin, Mallavadin and Prabhachandra. Sakatayana patronised by Amoghavarsha I wrote Sabdanusasana and Amoghavritti and Chavundaraya wrote Charitrasara. Akalanka Bhatta wrote Rajavarthika, Nyayavinishchaya, Ashtashati and the Laghiyastraya, Lakshmidhara compiled Vyavahara Kalpataru, Khandana Khanda Khadya and others.

The Sanskrit writing on medicine Kalyanakaraka by a court poet, Ugraditya, relates that the king requested the poet give the court a discourse on the evils of a non-vegetarian diet and the need to avoid such a diet to treat illnesses.

== Prakrit ==
Pushpadanta's contributions in Prakrit were Jasaurachariu and Nayakumarachariu.
