= Shivamogga Airport =

Airport in Karnataka, India

Shivamogga Airport Rashtrakavi Kuvempu Airport
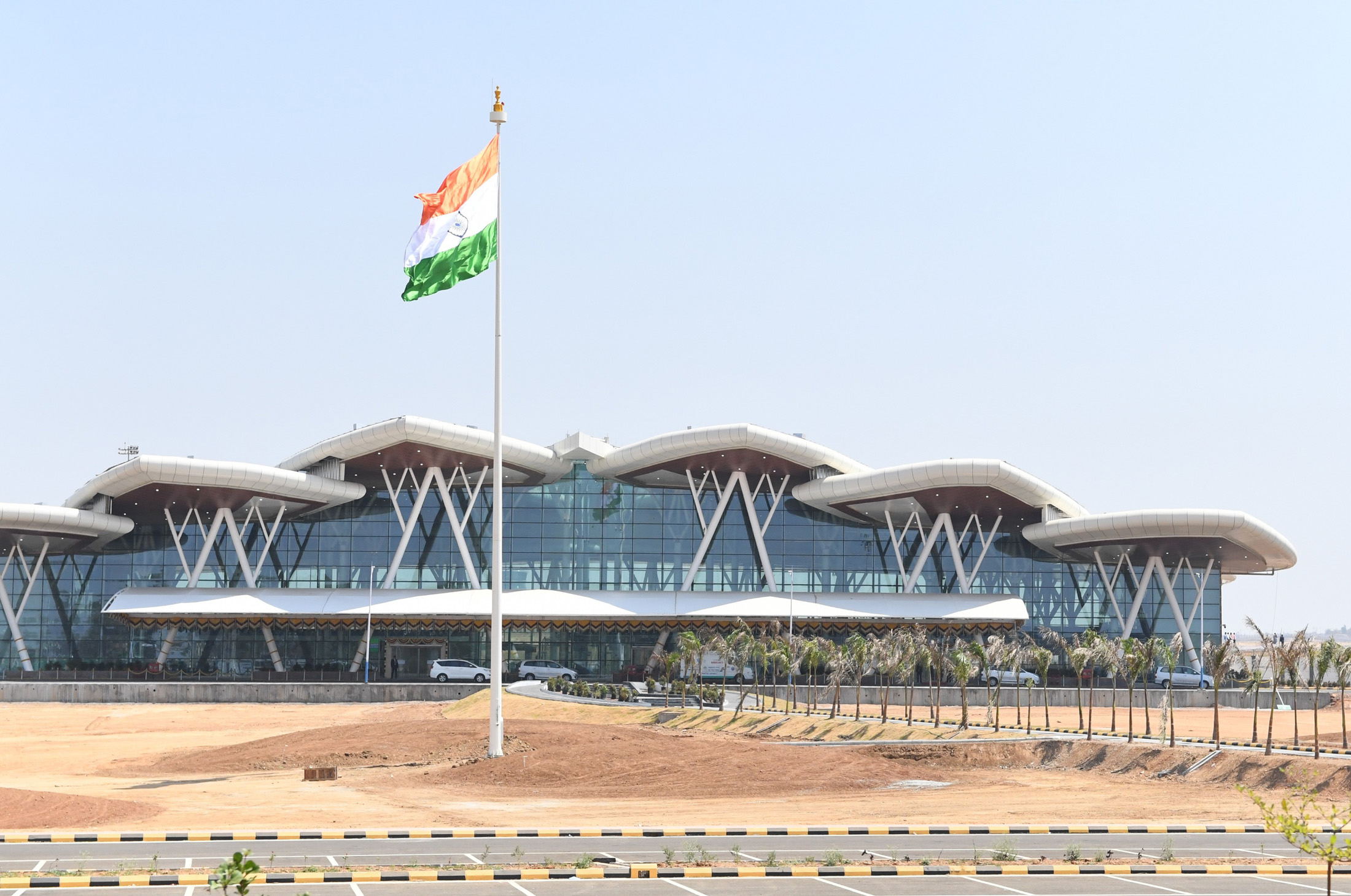
- IATA: RQY; ICAO: VOSH

Summary
- Airport type: Public
- Owner: Government of Karnataka
- Operator: KSIIDC
- Serves: Shimoga
- Location: Sogane, Shimoga, Karnataka, India
- Opened: 27 February 2023; 3 years ago
- Elevation AMSL: 615 m (2,018 ft)
- Coordinates: 13°51′17″N 75°36′38″E

Map
- Location of airport in Karnataka RQY (India)

Runways
Direction	Length		Surface
Direction	ft	m	Surface
08/26	10,498	3,200	Asphalt

Statistics (April 2025 - March 2026)
- Passengers: 1,81,587 (▲54.6%)
- Aircraft movements: 3,674 (▲31.4%)
- Cargo tonnage: —
- Source: AAI

Shivamogga Airport, officially renamed as Rashtrakavi Kuvempu Airport (IATA: RQY, ICAO: VOSH), is a domestic airport serving the city of Shimoga, Karnataka, India. It is located at Sogane, 8.8 km (5.5 mi) from Shimoga and 8.2 km (5.1 mi) from Bhadravathi. The airport was to be built under Public–Private Partnership (PPP) with the Government of Karnataka. However, due to delays in project execution, the contract was terminated in January 2015. On 15 June 2020, the Chief Minister of Karnataka, B. S. Yediyurappa, laid the foundation stone to start the construction of the airport at a cost of ₹ 4.5 billion. The airport is to be constructed in two phases, out of which the first phase was inaugurated on 27 February 2023 by Prime Minister, Narendra Modi. It is named after Kuvempu, a well known Kannada poet and novelist of the 20th century.

== History ==
A team of experts from Airports Authority of India (AAI) visited the two identified suitable sites, at Sogane near Shimoga and Nagarabavi near Ayanur on 4 April 2006. Of the two sites inspected by the AAI team, the one at Sogane was found most suitable, due to its wind direction and velocity conditions. The only concern was that the land was uneven and needed to be levelled. The other site near Ayanur was found inadequate in width for the runway of the proposed airport.

Nineteen companies had shown interest in developing the airport when the Government had called for an Expression of Interest (EoI) to develop airports in Kalaburagi, Bijapur and Shimoga. The project was awarded to a consortium of Maytas Infra Ltd.), NCC Infrastructure Holdings Ltd. (NCC) and VIE India Project Development and Holding, on 15 November 2007, on a BOT basis. Concession period was to be 30 years, to be extended for a further period of 30 years by Mutual Agreement.

Shimoga Airport Developers Pvt Ltd (SADPL), a Special Purpose Company, was established to sign the Project Development Agreement (PDA) with the Infrastructure Development Department (IDD) of the Government of Karnataka. The Shareholding pattern of Maytas Infra, NCC and VIE was 37%, 37% and 26% respectively in SADPL. The project development agreement was signed on 2 April 2008.

The foundation stone for the Phase I of construction was laid by former Chief Minister of Karnataka, B. S. Yeddyurappa, on 20 June 2008. Due to a change in the project shareholding ratio, a Supplementary Development Agreement was signed on 21 December 2010. Bengaluru-based company, Regional Airport-Holdings International Limited (RAHI), acquired 22% in the project and overall management and financial control.

In January 2015, the government decided to annul the land allotment for the airport because of “indifference and infighting” among the promoters. As no construction work had begun at the Shimoga airport, the government planned to re-tender the project.

On 15 June 2020, Chief Minister B. S. Yeddyurappa relaunched the long pending project. The airport will be built at a cost of ₹ 2.2 billion in about 662.38 acres land, initiated earlier at Sogane. It will be built as a part of the UDAN scheme. The airport was completed and inaugurated by Prime Minister Narendra Modi on 27 February 2023, with regular flight operations starting from 31 August 2023 to Bangalore operated by IndiGo.

== Land acquisition and lease ==
The government had acquired 662.38 acres of land, and ₹ 58.3 million released for acquisition and development. Compensation for farmers given, for private land, was ₹ 600,000 for an acre of dry land and ₹ 700,000 for an acre of wetland, and for farmers using government land ₹ 200,000 per acre. About 130 acres of private land and 530 acres of government land were acquired for the project. Families living in the affected area were provided monetary compensation and alternate housing.

The Land Lease Deed signed on 21 December 2010 commits the lessee to a rent of ₹ 20,232 per acre annually to the GoK (13.4 million). The lease rent will increase by 10% every three years during the lease period.

== Construction ==
Work on Phase I of the construction started in April 2011. However, out of the proposed 3,200 metre runway, only the work of levelling a 0.5-km stretch with boulders and concrete mixture was completed. After this, differences cropped up between the partners of the contractor and all work on the project was stopped.

On 15 June 2020, the Chief Minister of Karnataka B. S. Yeddyurappa relaunched the airport project. The airport is being built around a cost of ₹ 4.49 billion, in about 662 acres of land area. It will be built as a part of the UDAN scheme.

The airport will have the longest runway in the state, of 3,200 metres, after Kempegowda International Airport at Bangalore. It will be an airport of international standards, where widebody aircraft can land.

The airport is designed to operate Boeing 737 and Airbus A320 type aircraft, and can handle about 350 peak hour passengers. The project will be taken up in two phases. It was expected to be completed by 2022, but it is now completed and was inaugurated on 27 February 2023.

== Airlines and destinations ==
Airlines	Destinations
Star Air	Goa–Mopa, Hyderabad, Tirupati

Number of Passenger Travelled: From RQY Shivamogga Airport As per Airport Authority of India (AAI) data between April, 2023 to March, 2024 total 39040 passenger movement recorded. During January., 2025 and July 2025, which operate only domestic flights, handled 94,291 passengers. During the same period in 2024, Shivamogga airports handled 47,494 passengers.
