= Siddheshwar =

Mystic and Kannada poet

- Siddharameshwar
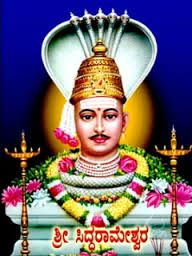
- Shri Shivyogi Siddharameshwar

Personal life
- Born: Solapur
- Parents: Muddanna (father); Suggaladevi (mother)
- Other name: Siddharama

Religious life
- Philosophy: Shivayoga

Siddheshwar also known as Siddharameshwar and Siddharama was one among the five acharya ("saint") of the Veerashaiva faith. Siddheshwar was a great contributor to Lingayat sampradaya of Hinduism. He was a great mystic and a Kannada poet who was a part of Basavanna's Lingayat revolution during the 12th century. His philosophy was one of service to mankind, the path of Shivayoga. Siddarama was instrumental in saving the vachana literature from destruction. Shri Siddharameshwar was born in Solapur City of Maharashtra.

Siddharama (c.1150) claimed to have written 68,000 vachanas out of which only 1379 are available. Along with Basava, Allama Prabhu, Devara Dasimayya and Channabasava, Siddharama is regarded as the most acknowledged and respected poets. Vachanakaras wrote in the genre of Veerashaiva, under Kannada literature from the mystic period. He shares the world view of other vachana poets in his rejection of blind conventions of caste and sex discrimination and emphasis on realization through personal experience. He too borrows Metaphors from diverse spheres of everyday life. Apart from vachanas, he has written several devotional works in tripadi. writing three-line verse, used from the 7th century.

== Siddarama at Srisailam ==
Siddarama was born in a Odde famiiy, the son of Muddanna and Suggaladevi, born in Solapur, Maharashtra. Although Raghavanka in his work Siddharama charite and some scholars like M. Chidananda Murthy claim he was born in Kudu vokkaliga family. When Siddarama was seven years old, Shiva appeared in the guise of a Jangam Swamiji and called himself Mallinath from Srisailam. The place where Mallinath met Siddharam is known as 'Gurubhet', which is now in front of the Collector's Bungalow in Solapur. This Jangam requested Siddharama to serve him hot fried tender Jowar. Next he demanded curd-rice in order to soothe the burning sensation in his stomach. Siddharama ran to his home and asked his mother for curd-rice. On his return to the fields, he searched for him, shouting, "Mallayya, Mallayya" did not find him. There he inquired the Kawadi Jangams who were on a pilgrimage to Shrishail. They promised to show him Mallayya. His quest for Mallayya made him determined to go to Shrishail.

At Shrishail Siddarama was shown the Mallikarjuna Jyotirlinga, but this linga of black stone did not please him. Then he inquired every object and every person about the whereabouts of Mallayya running over the length and breadth of Shrishail. Siddharama began to weep. His tears were collected in a tank in the ground, which presently became known as Nayan-Kunda. When Siddeshwar reached the brink of a very deep valley called 'Rudrakada' and peeping down he yelled out "Mallayya, Mallayya!, but Mallayya did not appear. As Siddharama was about to jump in the valley, Lord Mallikarjun (Mallinath) appeared and caught hold of him by his hands. The Lord pacified him and offered 'Vajrakundal' and 'Yoga Danda' which possesses the potential to fulfill all wishes. He visualized Mallayya telling him to return to Sonnalige and work towards making it the second Srishailam. The Lord Mallinath asked Siddharam to return to Sonnalgie to end grief on earth. The Lord Mallinath assured him that he himself would appear in the form of Shivalinga in Sonnalgie.

Siddha Ramappa Kolanu is a scenic spot located approximately one kilometre north of the Srisailam temple.

== Siddarama at Sonnalgie ==
Shivayogi Siddharama returned to Sonnalgie; the ruler of that time Nannappa and his wife Chamala Devi gave him 5 kosa land as they were told to do by a vision of Lord Shiva. Shivayogi Siddharama consecrated 68 lingas by the holy hands of Jagadguru Kapilasiddha Panditardhya, within the Panch Crosh of Sonnalgie making Sonnalgie a "Kshetra" (holy place). He saw divinity in every existence of the world. As part of Sharana revolution in the 12th century, he encouraged inter-caste marriages. Siddarama involved himself in public works. He undertook many irrigation projects for the common good. He dug lakes and built temples. He encouraged people to conduct mass weddings, and do other public works, which would benefit mankind. Many people joined him in transforming Sonnalige.

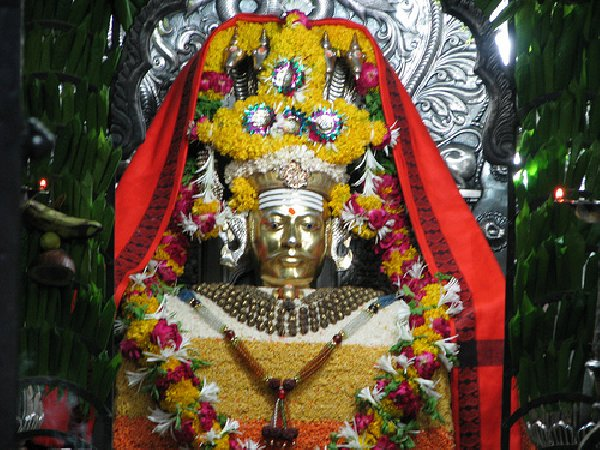
Shri.Siddheshwar at Siddheshwar Temple, Solapur

== Siddarama at Kalyana ==
Allama Prabhu's purpose was to make Siddharama worship Ishtalinga. Hence he proposed that Siddharama should accompany him to Kalyana, which was then the home of Basavanna and Ishtalinga worship. At Anubhava Mantapa Allama, Siddarama, Chennabasavanna, Basavanna and others discussed the need for Istalinga.

Siddarama accepted Chennabasavanna as his Guru. Chennabasavanna performed the Istalinga initiation for Siddarama. After his initiation, Siddarama made rapid progress along the path of Shivayoga, and in course of time succeeded Chennabasavanna on Shunya Simhasana, or the pontificial throne. Siddarama participated in various discussions of the Anubhavamantapa. These discourses made him a Shiva yogi.

== Siddarama Back at Sonnalige ==
He returned to Sonnalige and entrusted his work to Havinahala Kallaiah. He constructed a cave in the middle of a lake. There he practiced Shiva yoga until he attained his Ikya state.

== Shivyogi siddarameshawara samadhi at Solapur ==
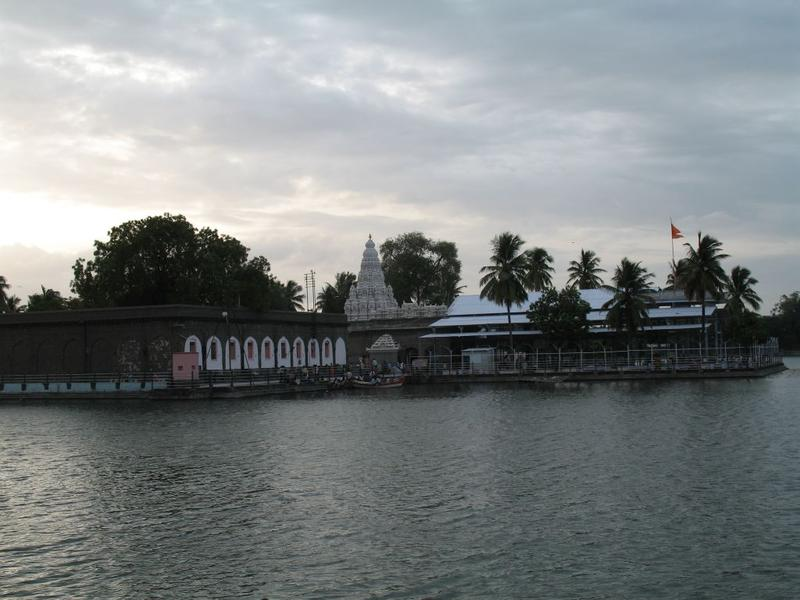
Shri.Siddheshwar Temple (Lake view)

Shivayogi Siddharama consecrated 68 lingas by the holy hands of Jagadguru Kapilasiddha Panditardhya, within the Panch Crosh of Sonnalgie making Sonnalgie a "Kshetra" (holy place). Siddarama returned to Sonnalige and involved himself in public works. He dug lakes and built temples. He encouraged people to conduct mass weddings, and do other works, which would benefit mankind. Many people joined him in transforming Sonnalige. He returned to Sonnalige and entrusted his work to Havinahala Kallaiah. He constructed a cave in the middle of a lake. There he practiced Shiva yoga until he attained his Ikya state and entombed himself alive.

== Shivayogi Siddarameshwara Matha at Sollapura Tarikere, Karnataka ==
Sollapura is a village near Tarikere in Karnataka, India. It is known for the Sri Siddarameshwara Matha(Temple), which is dedicated to Siddharama ( Siddarameshawara).

According to local tradition, devotees who were unable to travel to Solapur in present day Maharashtra established a Siddarameshwara temple in this village. Over time, the settlement came to be known as Sollapura, reflecting its connection with the original pilgrimage center.

Every year, the temple celebrated the Dasara Mahanavami(Ambhu) Festival during October. The festival attracts thousands of devotees from nearby villages and other regions. A major highlight of the celebration is the grand procession of the flower decorated pallakki(palanquin) carrying the deity.

== Inscriptions ==
His influence on several contemporaneous as well as subsequent Sharanas is evident from many sources. His tradition has come down continuously from his time to ours throughout South India. Gifts and charities made in his name by kings and other rulers are recorded in inscriptions. He was an ardent believer in Action. Though he was at first inclined towards visible works such as construction of tanks and temples, installation of Lingas, establishment of alms-housed etc., as calculated to lead him to Heaven, he came later, under Prabhu's influence, to believe that such philanthropic works by themselves, any more than the possession of the third eye, the daily access to Kailasa and such other yogic accomplishments, would not lead to Mukti. As apparent from his vachanas as well as from his biography by Raghavanka, his mastery of yoga was extraordinary. His meeting with Prabhu proved to be a turning-point in his life, and his yoga was transformed into Shivayoga. Another important stage in his life is the initiation given him by Chennabasavanna. His sojourn at Kalyana gave a new orientation to his life, living as he now did among numerous Sharanas in Basavanna's Anubhava Mantapa, and the feeling that he was God made way for a spirit of utter submission to God.

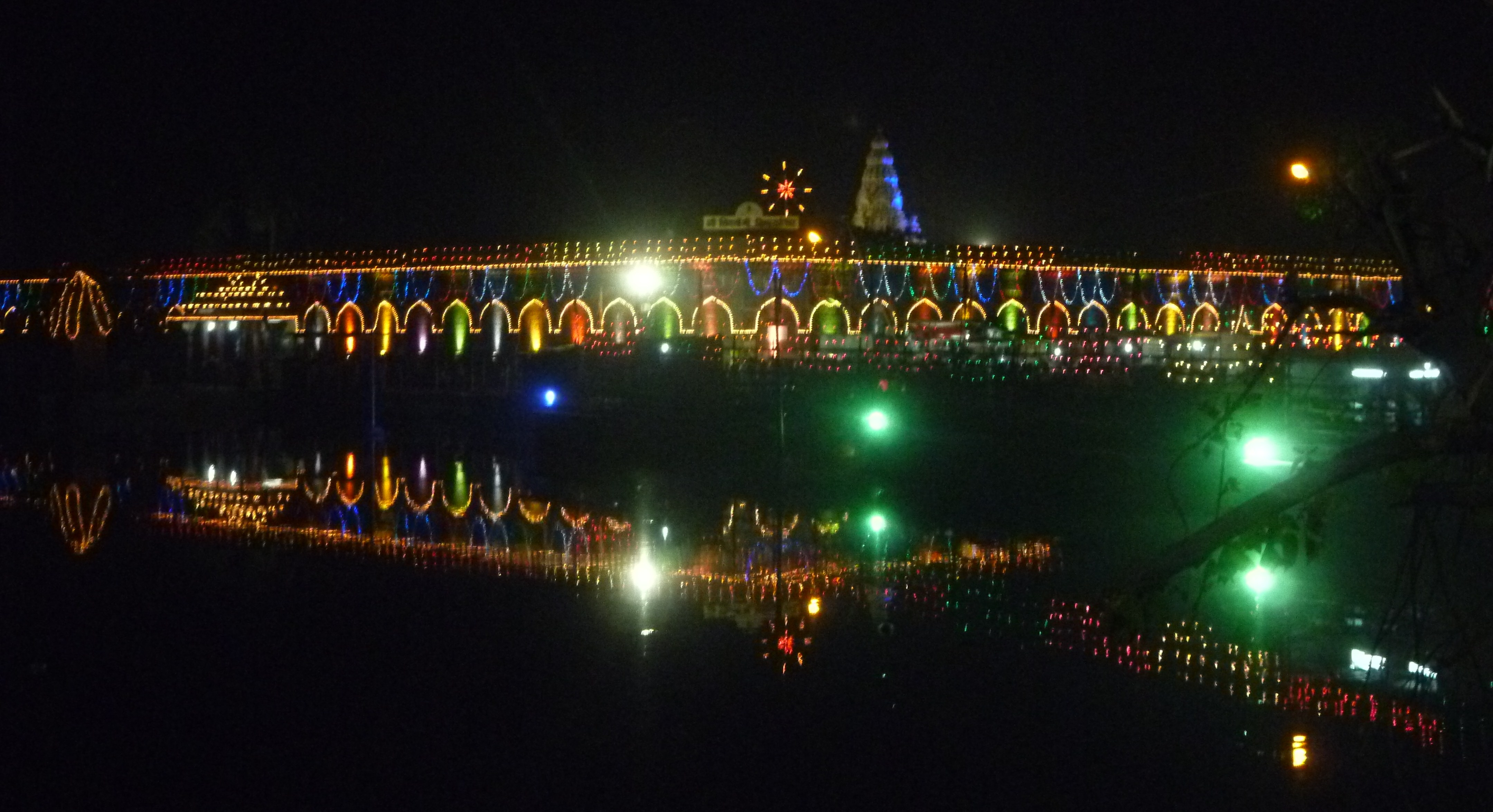
Shri.Siddheshwar Temple During (makar Sankranti) Gadda Fair

Another important point is the citing of Siddharama's vachanas in the inscriptions of the Sevuna period. It is not known under what circumstances these vachanas came to be a part of the Sevuna inscriptions. It is possible that Siddharama's vachanas became very popular and obviously the composers of the inscriptions wanted to enhance the value of them by quoting the vachanas of Siddharama. It is also possible that Siddharama specially wrote these two vachanas as a preamble to gifts made to the temples so that nobody would have the moral courage to go against the purpose of the grant, as it had the sanction of a great saint like Siddharama. Whatever might have been the real purpose of these vachanas, there is no doubt that they were important. Many Sevuna inscriptions contain the vachanas of Siddharama. A town by name Hilli in Akkalkot was another well-known Virasaiva centre. There was a temple here dedicated to Kudala Sangamadeva which attracted pilgrims and devotees from Karnataka and other places.

== Siddarama's Vachanas in. Kannada ==
Siddarama wrote vachanas with the name "Kapilasidda Mallikarjuna". There are 1,679 vachanas of his. In addition to vachanas, Siddarama wrote Sthotra Threevidhigalu with "Yoginatha" as his signature.

- Ragavanka wrote Siddarama Charitra, the history of Siddarama.
- Jayadevi-thai Ligade has written Siddarama Purana.

== Notes ==
Scholars like M. M. Kalburgi, M. S. Vrishabhendraswamy, M. S. Nagaraja Rao and others have studied this problem in great detail. It is said that at least 22 inscriptions of the Sevuna period contain Siddharama's vachanas. Vide: M. M. Kalburgi, Sasanagalalli Sivasaranaru; M. S. Vrishabhendraswamy, Sasanagalalli Sri Siddharamana Vachanagalu (The Karnatak University Journal - Humanities, Vol. x, p. 204; M.S. Nagaraja Rao, Karnataka Bharati, Vol.3.4 and Vol. 4.3, pp 3–14 and p. 101-112)
