= Jayadevi Taayi Ligade =

Indian writer in the Kannada language (1912–1986)

- Born: 23 June 1912; Solapur, British India
- Died: 24 July 1986 (aged 74); Basavakalyan, India
- Awards: Sahitya Akademi Award; Devaraja Bahaddur Award

Jayadevitai Ligade (23 June 1912 – 24 July 1986) was an Indian poet and activist who wrote in the Kannada and Marathi languages.

Ligade was president of the 48th Kannada Sahitya Parishat, a non-profit promoting literature in the Kannada language, held in Mandya in 1974, and the first female president of the conference. She fought to unify Sholapur with Karnataka on the grounds of the majority Kannada-speaking community in the city. She has published several books on Sharana Sahitya in Kannada and Marathi, and wrote Siddarama purana, Sri Siddarameshwara. She also contributed funds to publishing Sharana Sahitya material.

Ligade was president of the Veerashaiva Women's Council (ಅಖಿಲ ಭಾರತ ವೀರಶೈವ ಮಹಿಳಾ ಪರಿಷತ್ತಿನ) and a member of the Central Sahitya Academy. She received the State Sahitya Academy Award and the Devaraja Bahaddur Award (ದೇವರಾಜ ಬಹಾದ್ದೂರ್ ಬಹುಮಾನ).
