= Sahyadri Science College =

Government college in Shimoga, Karnataka, India

- Former names: Government First Grade College; Sahyadri College
- Established: 1940
- Founders: Jayachamarajendra Wadiyar
- Affiliations: Kuvempu University
- Location: Shimoga, Karnataka, India; 13.916254608870982°N 75.5939062598561°E
- Website: www.kussc.ac.in

Sahyadri Science College is a government college located in the Shivamogga district of Karnataka. The college is a constituent college of the Kuvempu University, Shivamogga.

== History ==
College was established as intermediate college in 1940 by Jayachamarajendra Wadiyar then Maharaja of Mysore. In 1956, it was upgraded to the First grade College level and renamed as Government First Grade College. Subsequently, in 1962, it underwent another name change to become Sahyadri College, and in 1984, it was bifurcated as Sahyadri Arts College and Sahyadri Science College.

== Alumni ==
Notable Alumni of the college include:

- U. R. Ananthamurthy
- Poornachandra Tejaswi
- D.H.Shankaramurthy
- K.V. Subbanna
- C.N.R. Rao
- Shri. K.V. Subbanna, an eminent theatre personality and winner of the Magsaysay Award

== Former teachers ==
Padmashri K. S. Nissar Ahmed taught in the college for two terms during 1967–72 and 1975–78.

== Dr. C.N.R. Rao Auditorium ==
Eminent scientist and Bharat Ratna C.N.R. Rao studied here during 1947 to 1949 for his Intermediate course. In honour of his contribution and service to the nation, the college dedicated an auditorium in the name of him. During the year 2006, Dr. Rao visited Sahyadri Science College and addressed the students and staff. In his talk, Dr. Rao strongly advised the students to evince more interest in scientific research.
