= Devanur Mahadeva =

Indian writer (born 1948)

Devanoora Mahadeva
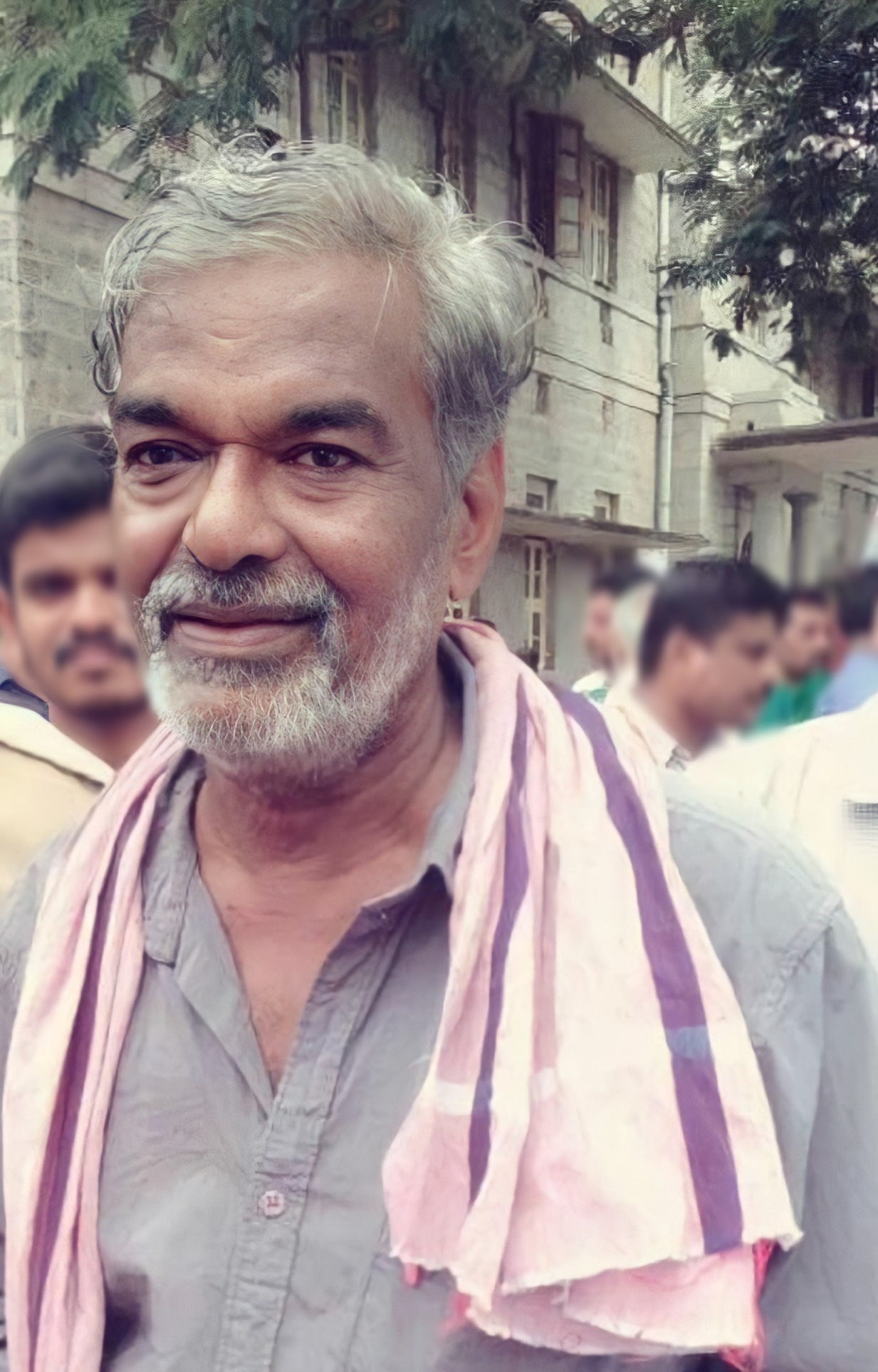
- Born: 10 June 1948 (age 78); Devanuru, Nanjangud Taluk, Mysore District, Karnataka, India
- Occupations: Teacher; Writer; politician; Dalit leader
- Writing career
- Subject: Kannada literature
- Notable works: Odalaala; Kusumabaale; Edege Bidda Akshara
- Notable awards: Padmashri; Sahitya Akademi Award; Pampa Award
- Movement: Kannada Dalita Bandaya
Devanur Mahadeva
Academic background
- Influences: Ram Manohar Lohia; Dr. B. R. Ambedkar

Devanoora Mahadeva is an Indian writer and an intellectual, who writes in Kannada language. The Government of India conferred upon him the Padma Shri award, the fourth highest civilian award.In 2026, Government of Karnataka selected him for Kannada's highest literacy honour Pampa Award.

Known among literary circles to be a rebel, Mahadeva rejected to chair the Kannada Sahitya Sammelana twice and the Nrupatunga Award in 2010, citing his dissatisfaction that despite being the state's official language, Kannada is yet to be made the primary language of instruction in schools and colleges. He wants Kannada to be made the medium of learning at least up to the college level. Mahadeva is a Central Sahitya Academy awardee for his novel Kusuma Baale. In the 1990s he rejected the government's offer to nominate him to Rajya Sabha (the upper house of the Parliament of India) under the writer's quota. In 2022, he published a book on the RSS that gained popularity and critical acclaim both for its content and its innovative open publishing model.

Yara japthigu sigada navilugalu (ಯಾರ ಜಪ್ತಿಗೂ ಸಿಗದ ನವಿಲುಗಳು) a collection of articles on Devanoora Mahadeva's works and vision edited by Dr. P Chandrika was well received.

== Personal life ==
Mahadeva was born in 1948 in Devanuru village in Nanjanagudu Taluk, Mysore district of the Karnataka state, India, He worked at CIIL in Mysore.

== Literary contributions ==
- Dyavanooru (ದ್ಯಾವನೂರು)
- Odalaala (ಒಡಲಾಳ)
- Kusuma Baale (ಕುಸುಮಬಾಲೆ)
- Edege Bidda Akshara (ಎದೆಗೆ ಬಿದ್ದ ಅಕ್ಷರ)
- Devanura Mahadeva Avara Krithigalu (ದೇವನೂರ ಮಹಾದೇವ ಅವರ ಎಲ್ಲ ಕಥೆ ಕಾದಂಬರಿಗಳು)
- RSS: Aaala mattu agala (ಆರ್ ಎಸ್ ಎಸ್: ಆಳ ಮತ್ತು ಅಗಲ)

Gandhi Matu maveo ( ಗಾಂಧಿ ಮತ್ತು ಮಾವೊ)

== Awards and recognitions ==
Devanooru's awards and accolades include:

- Karnataka Sahitya Academy Award.
- 1990 - Kendra Sahitya Akademi Award for the novel Kusumabale
- 2011 - Padma Shri
- 2024 - 'Vaikom Award' for Social Justice by Government of Tamil Nadu.
- 2025 - Pampa Award, Karnataka's highest literary award

== See also ==
- K. B. Siddaiah
- Siddalingaiah
- C. P. Krishnakumar
