= Hullambi =

- Village
- Country: India
- State: Karnataka
- District: Dharwad

Government
  - Type: Panchayat raj
  - Body: Gram panchayat

Population (2011)
  - Total: 1,477

Languages
  - Official: Kannada
- Time zone: UTC+5:30 (IST)
- ISO 3166 code: IN-KA
- Vehicle registration: KA
- Website: karnataka.gov.in

Hullambi is a village in Dharwad district of Karnataka, India.

== Demographics ==
As of the 2011 Census of India there were 315 households in Hullambi and a total population of 1,477 consisting of 747 males and 730 females. There were 183 children ages 0-6.

== Notable people ==
- C. P. Siddhashrama - Academic, critic and writer in Kannada, was born in the village.
