= P. T. Narasimhachar =

Indian writer

P. T. Narasimhachar (Pu Ti Na)
- Born: 17 March 1905; Melukote, Pandavapura taluk, Mysore district, Kingdom of Mysore, British India (now Mandya district, Karnataka, India)
- Died: 23 October 1998 (aged 93); Bangalore, Karnataka
- Occupations: Writer, poet
- Writing career
- Pen name: Pu Ti Na (ಪು ತಿ ನ)
- Genre: Fiction
- Movement: Kannada: Navodaya

Purohita Thirunarayanaiyengar Narasimhachar (17 March 1905 – 23 October 1998), commonly known as PuTiNa, was a playwright and poet in the Kannada language. Along with Kuvempu and D. R. Bendre, he formed a well-known trio of Kannada Navodaya poets. He was awarded the Padma Shri by the Government of India in 1991. He was a Sahitya Akademi fellow and the winner of the Pampa Award, awarded by the Government of Karnataka in 1991.

== Life and career ==
Narasimhachar was born on 17 March 1905 into an orthodox Iyengar family in the town of Melkote in Mandya district of Karnataka.

Apart from being a writer, PuTiNa also worked in the army of Mysore state and later in the legislature of the Government of Mysore state. He died on 13 October 1998.

== Literary contributions ==
PuTiNa was one of the catalysts of the Navodaya style of Kannada literature. According to Lakshminarayana Bhat, "At a broader level, the growth of the Navodaya style of literature resembles the growth of the writings of PuTiNa". In his first collection of poems Hanathe, he offers insights into significant moments in life by using a simple language and style. Many of PuTiNa's writings detail the beauty and majesty of nature, bordering on the spiritual. Two of his well-known writings are Ahalye, which subtly narrates the conflict between kama and dharma, and Gokula Nirgamana, which narrates the departure of Krishna from Gokula. PuTiNa's essays reflect his dominant poetic personality.

== Awards and recognitions ==
- Kendra Sahitya Academy Award in 1966 for his work "Hamsa Damayanti Mattu Itara Roopakagalu"
- Pampa Prashasthi in 1991 from Karnataka Government
- Padma Shri from the Government of India, 1991

== Bibliography ==
=== Collection of poems ===
- Hanate
- Mandaliru
- Sharadayaamini
- Hrudaya vihari
- Ganesha darshana
- Rasa Sarasvati
- Maley Degula
- Irula Meragu
- Haley Chiguru – Hosa Beru
- Raaga raagini
- honala haadu

=== Musical dramas ===
- Vasanta Chandana
- Seeta Kalyana
- Ahalye
- Gokula Nirgamana
- Shabari
- Doniya Binada
- Vikatakavi
- Ramapatabisheka
- Deepalakshmi
- Harinabhisarana

=== Collection of stories ===
- Ramachariya Nenapu
- Rathasaptami and other stories
- Sri Rama Pattabhiskekham
- Hamsa Damayanti
- Eechalu marad kelage

== See also ==
Kuvempu

Da Ra Bendre
