= Chakkere =

Village in Karnataka, India

Chakkere is a village in Channapatna Taluk, Bengaluru South district, Karnataka, India.
