= Kannada poetry =

Kannada (ಕನ್ನಡ) is the language spoken in Karnataka (ಕರ್ನಾಟಕ, ಕರುನಾಡು). Karnataka has eight Jnanapeeth (ಜ್ಞಾನ ಪೀಠ ಪುರಸ್ಕೃತ) award winners, the highest honor bestowed for Indian literature. From the period of Adikavi Pampa(ಆದಿಕವಿ ಪಂಪ) who proclaimed his wish to be reborn as a little bee in the land of Kannada, Kannada poetry has come a long way to Kuvempu (ಕುವೆಂಪು) and Dattatreya Ramachandra Bendre (ದರಾ ಬೇಂದ್ರೆ)

== Pre-history ==
Kannada poetry has been traced back to around 5th century CE, though none of those early works have been found. The earliest extant poetry in tripadi meter are the Kappe Arabhatta records of 700 CE. The first well known Kannada poet was Adikavi Pampa who wrote in an archaic style of Kannada called Halegannada (figuratively "Old Kannada"). His Vikramarjuna Vijaya is hailed as a classic even to this day. With this and his other important work Adipurana he set a trend of poetic excellence for the Kannada poets of the future.

Kannada poetry called vachanas, were pithy comments on that period's social, religious and economic conditions. More importantly, they hold a mirror to the seed of a social revolution, which caused a radical re-examination of the ideas of caste, creed and religion. One of the important ideas coming out of this revolution was the view that Work is worship and a path to spirituality.

== Bhakti ==
Kannada poets have the unique distinction of sowing the seeds of one of the richest forms of classical music: South Indian Carnatic music. The Dasas or saints, around 15th century, sang the glory of God through poems. These poems called Padas were usually of 10 to 20 lines. They expressed the desire of the Bhakta or devotee to be one with God. This form of poetry was highly amenable to musical composition and exposition. This music evolved into the highly sophisticated and codified Carnatic music.

The Haridasas spread the message of peace, love and bhakti in their Dasa Sahitya, which are also popularly known as Devaranamas.

== Navodaya (New birth) ==
Navodaya figuratively means a new birth. The early 20th century saw a reincarnation of Kannada poetry which had been dormant for a few centuries in the face of British occupation of India. This period saw great poets like Srikanthaiah, Kuvempu, Bendre, Shivaram Karanth writing poetry. This genre was highly influenced by Romantic English poetry. It was B. M. Srikanthaiah who started this movement of sorts with his translation of a few critically acclaimed English poems of the Romantic period. B. M. Shri advocated a movement away from reliance on Sanskrit, as traditional Kannada poetry had done, and borrow from more modern English poets and genres. Many educated Kannadigas, especially those were in the teaching profession, realised that they need to express themselves in their mother tongue and started writing poetry in Kannada. Kuvempu is a case in point who was convinced by his professor (of British origin) that he should write in his mother tongue. Kuvempu went on to become a "Rashtrakavi" (national poet). His love of nature, realisation of the greatness of man's spirit and the vision to see the blend of nature and God made him more than Kannada's Wordsworth. Another interesting case is that of Shivaram Karanth who was a man of great intellect, rock-solid convictions and a profound social sense. He was known as the Leonardo da Vinci of Karnataka.

== Navya (New) ==
Indian Independence in 1947 brought with it the promises of freedom and a new genre sprouted in Kannada poetry. The torch-bearer of this tradition was Gopalakrishna Adiga. The Navya poets wrote for and liked disillusioned intellectuals. The sophistication in the use of language and the importance of technique to poetry reached new heights in this genre.

== Other genres ==
Kannada poetry in the last 50 years has been closely related to social aspects. The caste system gave rise to the Bandaya and Dalita genres of poetry. The atrocities against women and the general ill-treatment meted out to them in Indian society gave rise to the Stri (Woman) genre of poetry.

== Awards ==
Kannada poetry has won eight Jnanapeeth awards, the second highest for any other Indian language after Hindi.

== Reaching people ==
The popularity of poetry is gauged in terms of the response that the educated and interested elite give. But the real popularity of poetry is when common people sing it. Popular appeal is not very easy to achieve for any form of poetry; especially when audiences are not kept in mind. Kannada poetry has a few instances of such mass popularity. Kumaravyasa's retelling of the Mahabharata is recited in homes even today. Bhavageete (figuratively "emotion poetry") has popularized many Kannada poems and has people humming them.

== See also ==
- List of Kannada-language poets
- Kannada literature
- Kannada meter (poetry)
- Manteswami Kavya
