= Annadanaiah Puranik =

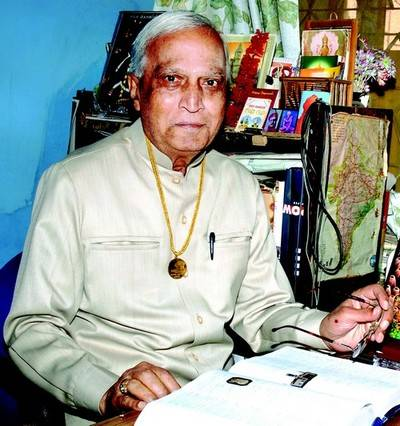
- Born: 8 March 1928; Dyampura, Yelburga, Koppal district, Karnataka),
- Died: 20 October 2015 (aged 87); Bangalore, India
- Occupations: Advocate, Freedom fighter, writer
- Writing career
- Language: Kannada
- Genres: Fiction, drama

Annadanaiah (Annadanayya) Puranik (8 March 1928 – 20 October 2015), Indian writer, cultural activist, freedom fighter, modern vachanakara and an advocate. After Indian independence, he has served as an Advocate in state high court of Karnataka for five decades. He was also conferred the title Sahityaratna, for his contribution to Kannada literature and enormous contribution during a secretarial term with Kannada Sahitya Parishat.

Annadanayya Puranik is known for his participation in Quit India Movement alongside Mahatma Gandhi. He has also been instrumental in the Hyderabad Karnataka movement in 1947–1948. He is the Founder general secretary of All India Basava Samithi and has contributed towards promotion of Basava Philosophy in various languages. He was also a Hon. General secretary of Kannada Sahitya Parishad. Being a member of Gazetteer advisory committee at Gazetteer of Karnataka Government, he has contributed towards publishing Gazetteers of districts of the state. He was also member of the first language commission for Karnataka.

== Early life and education ==
Annadanaiah Puranik was born in Dyampura, a village in Yelburga Taluk of Koppal District. His father Sri Kallinatha Shastri Puranik is known for writings Puranas in Kannada, such as Sharana Basaveshwara Purana, Itagi Bhimambika Purana and others. His brother Siddaiah Puranik is a famous Kannada laureate. His daughter Chandrika Puranik is also Kannada author and has served as Kannada lecturer various institutions in Bangalore.

== Works ==
- Sri Basaveshwara
- Vachana Mandara
- Channabasava Sahitya
- Vachana Saurabha
- Nyaaya Darushana

== See also ==
- Kannada
- Kannada literature
- Vachana Sahitya
