= S. G. Siddaramayya =

Indian poet

S G Siddaramayya is an Indian poet and teacher who works in the Kannada language.

Siddaramayya taught at Tumkur. He served as Chairman of Kannada Pustaka Pradhikara between 22 March 2005 to 31 March 2008. He initiated vachanaabhiruchi kammata at district level, to engage youth to read Kannada books. He speaks on cultural policy in Karnataka and is involved in various Pro-Kannada activities in Karnataka and Mumbai.
