= Venugopal Sorab =

Indian poet and writer

Venugopala Soraba (29 November 1937 – 29 March 1995) was an Indian poet and writer in Kannada and in English. He authored five novels in Kannada and several collections of poems in Kannada and English. His first major literary work was a collection of poems called Musuku Nasuku.

== Works ==
His works include:

- Musuku Nasuku
- Dhaare
- Hoo Higgu
- Bayalaagada Jana
- Jeeva Jeevanta
- Two Children and the Singing Bird (English)

== See also ==
- Vellala Sathyam
