= H. S. Mukthayakka =

Indian writer

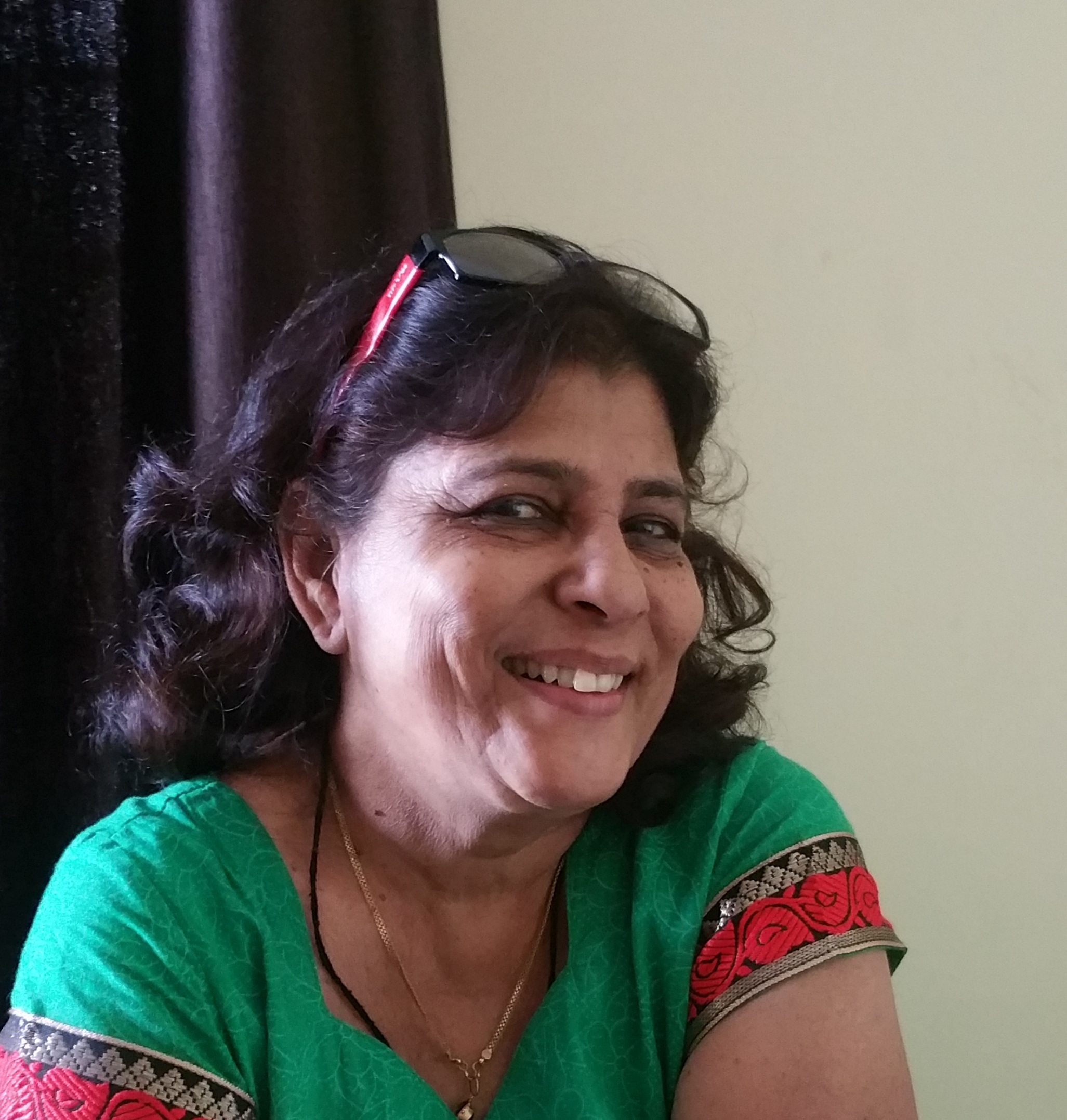
- Writing career
- Genres: Poetry, writer
- Subject: Literature

H. S. Mukthayakka is a writer in Kannada. She is one of the pioneers of modern woman's poetry in Kannada literature. She is the daughter of the poet Late. Shantarasa. Hailing from Raichur district, she was a lecturer in a women's college and retired as a principal. She resides in Raichur District, Karanataka.

== Literary career ==
During the 1980s, women poets in Kannada literature did not express themselves freely in their literary works. It was during this time Mukthayakka published her first romantic poetry collection entitled Naanu Mattu Avanu.

H.S. Mukthayakka's poems have been translated into English and featured in The Penguin anthology of contemporary Indian women poets and Indian Love Poems.

Her poems have been translated into Spanish, English, Marathi, Telugu, Tamil and Malayalam and various other languages. She was awarded the Karnataka Sahitya Akademi Award for Poetry for one of her poetry works.

Ghazal, being a rich form in Urdu, was first brought to Kannada form by renowned Kannada poet Late. Shantarasa. Following her father's footsteps, Mukthayakka wrote the most beautiful, Love some Ghazals in Kannada. She created history in Kannada Literary world by publishing the first Ghazal poetry book written in Kannada entitled Nalavattu Ghazalugalu. Her first Ghazal book is regarded as a guide for aspirants of the Ghazal form. Her various Ghazals are used as an illustration of form and technique which serves as a guide to learning the Ghazal form in Kannada. Mukthayakka and her father are pioneers of the Ghazal form in Kannada literature.

H. S. Mukthayakka was a member of the Karnataka Sahitya Academy for one term.

Students of Gulburga and Dharwad and Viajyapura University have made Dissertation and M.phil on H. S. Mukthayakka's works.

M.A students have chosen H. S. Mukthaykka's Ghazal works and poetry works as one of their main leading topics of study.

H.S.Mukthayakka's poems have been included in textbooks of P.U.C to master's degrees of Gulburga, Vijayapura, Bangalore, Mysore, Mangalore, Dravidian universities and also in high schools of Maharashatra.

H. S. Mukthayakka's literary works consist of five collections of poetry, three collections of Ghazal poetry, five collections of prose, a collection of her entire Ghazal poetry and one collection of couplets.

== Literary works ==
=== Poetry collections ===
- Nanu mattu avanu
- Neevu kaanire Neevu kaanire
- Kabhi Kabhi
- Tanhai
- Ninagagi bareda kavitegalu

=== Ghazal poetry ===
- Nalavattu Ghazalugalu
- Muvattaidu Ghazalugalu
- Nalavattidu Ghazalugalu
- Mai Aur Mere Lamhe ( collection of H.S.Mukthayakka's entire Ghazal poetry)

=== Prose ===
- Shivasharani Mukthayakka (for children)
- Dhakkeya Bommanna ( a research work)
- Kannada sahityadalli Sthree Savedanegalu
- Appa ( Compilation book)
- Madireya Nadinnalli ( Travelogue)

=== Couplets ===
- Avanu madhu saavu ( a collection of couplets)

== Awards and honours ==
- Karnataka Sahitya Akademi Award for Poetry
- Karanataka Sahitya Academy Vishesha Gaurava Prashasti
- Kannada Sahitya Parishattina Mallika prashasti
- Dharawada Vidhyavardhaka Sanghada Mato Shri Ratnamma Hegede prashasti
- Gadagina Kala parishattina prashasti
- Sedamna Amma prashasti
- Gulburga Vishwavidyalaya Rajyotsava prashasti
- S.R. Patil Pratishtanada Smt. Manikyamma prashasti
