= Gajaga =

Indian poet

- Writing career
- Language: Sanskrit
- Period: 9th–10th century
- Genre: Rashtrakuta literature

Gajaga, (Gaja is Sanskrit for elephant and whose earlier name was Gajankusha) was a writer of Rashtrakuta literature in the Kannada language of the 9th-10th century. he finds mention in Shabdamanidarpana, a comprehensive and authoritative work on Kannada grammar authored by Kesiraja in 1260 CE, He was considered a path breaking poet and writer of his times in the "classical age" of Kannada literature. Unfortunately no work by Gajaga has survived, but there are evidences that suggest that he was a prolific writer.

== See also ==
- Rashtrakuta literature
