= H. Tipperudraswamy =

Indian Kannada writer, scholar

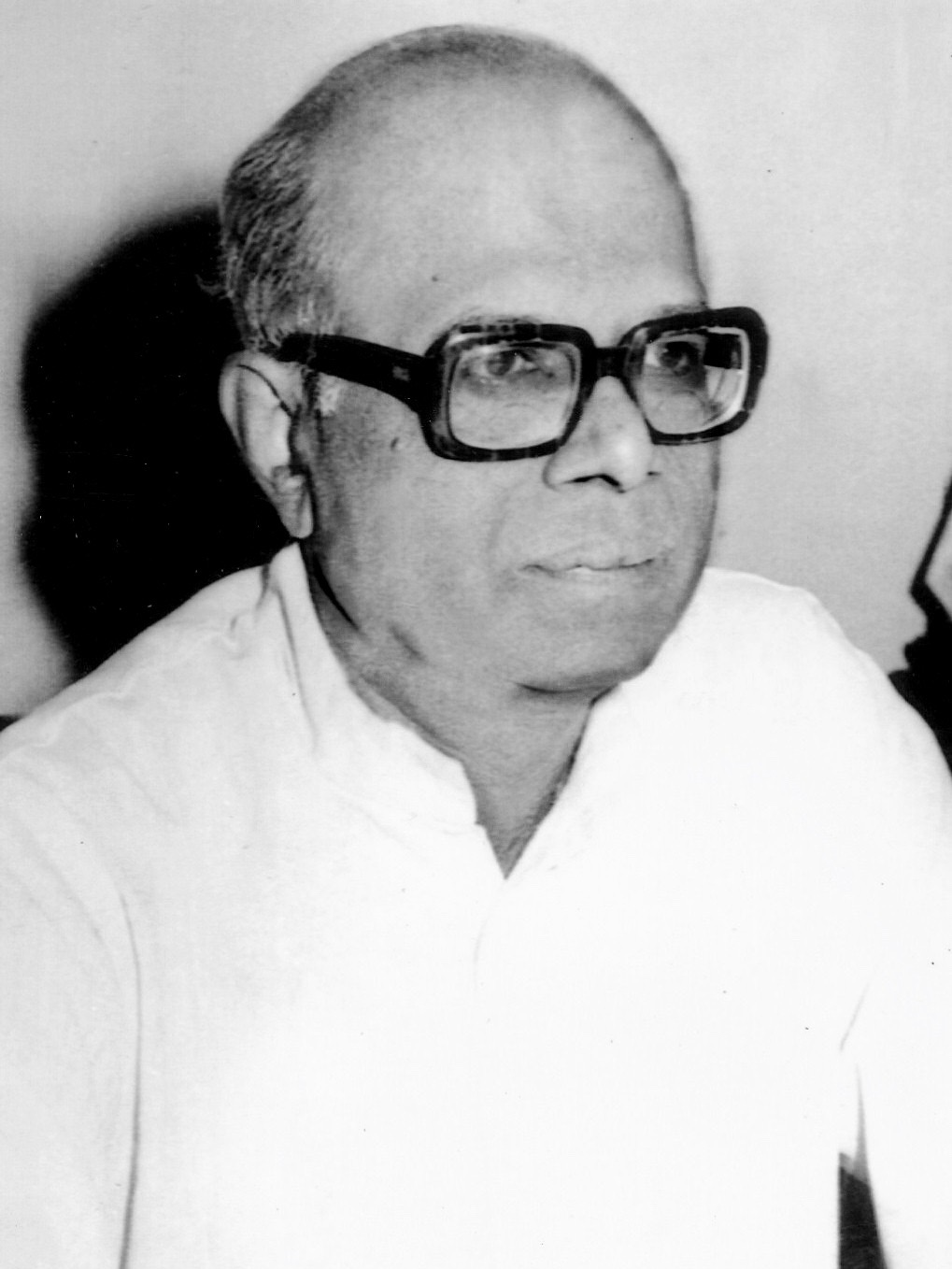
- Born: 3 February 1928; Hiregonigere village, Honnāli, Davanagere district, Karnataka, India
- Died: 28 October 1994 (aged 66); Mysore, Karnataka, India
- Occupations: Novelist, writer, professor
- Writing career
- Genres: Historical novel, criticism

Honnali Tipperudraswamy (3 February 1928 – 28 October 1994) was an Indian scholar and writer of Kannada literature. He wrote political history, religious realities and cultural aspects. He has written a few biographies meant for children on the lives of Kannada poets and Veerashaiva saints. He has made contributions to literary criticism and modern literature.

== Early life and education ==
Swamy was born in Hiregonigere village, Honnāli, Davanagere district, and obtained early education in his native town and Teerthahalli. He secured B.A. Hons. in 1951 and M.A. in 1952 degrees in Kannada from the University of Mysore. His work, ‘Sharanara Anubhaava Saahitya’ (Mystical Literature of the Shivasharanas’) earned him a Ph. D. degree from the Karnataka University.

== Post held ==
He joined his alma mater as a lecturer in 1964 and later became the director of the Institute for Postal and Correspondence Courses in the University of Mysore (1973–75). He was Director of the Post Graduate Centre of the University at Bhadra Project in Shivamogga district (1975-1984) and Director of "Sri Kuvempu Kannada Adhyayana Samsthe Mysore" till he sought voluntary retirement in 1987.

== Awards ==
Tipperudraswamy was awarded the Kendra Sahitya Academy award for his "Karnataka Samskriti Sameekshe" in 1969. He received the Lifetime Award of the Karnataka Sahitya Academy in 1985.

== Works ==
=== Novels ===
He wrote novels on the famous saints such as Paripoornadedege Allamaprabhu, Kartarana Kammata Basaveshwara, Kadaliya Karpura Akkamahadevi and he also wrote novels on the famous kings of Karnataka such as Vijaya Kalyana on Proudhadevaraya and Satyashraya Samrajya on Immadi Pulukeshi.

- Paripoornadedege
- Kadaliya Karpura
- Kartarana Kammata
- Jyoti Belagutide
- Neralacheya Baduku
- Jadadalli Jangama
- Alivininda Ulivige
- Aviralajnani Chennabasavanna
- Shistugara Shivappanayaka
- Vachana Virupaksha
- Vijaya Kalyana
- Satyashraya Samrajya

=== Criticism and other works ===
- Shunyatatva Vikasa Mattu Shunya Sampadane (1963)
- Sharanara Anubava Sahitya (1963)
- Vacanagalalli Virashaivadharma (1969)
- Karnataka Samskriti Samikshe (1968)
- Kannadadalli Anubhava Sahitya (1962)
- Chmarasa (Biography)
- Bhimakavi (1970)
- Shri Sharana Charita Manasa (1956) (Textual Criticism)
- Amugi Devayyagala Sngatya (1965) (Textual Criticism)
- Siddarma Charite (1975) (Textual Criticism)
- Basaveshvara Vachanadeepike
- Shunyasampadane
- Prataparudreeya
- Sahitya Vimarsheya Tatvagalu

== About him and his literature ==
- H. Tipperudraswamy (Biography) by N. S. Tharanath
- H. Tipperudraswamy (Biography) by Honnalli Channesha
- Shivachinthana A Felicitation Volume about the Life and Literature of H. Thipperudraswamy
