= Vellala Sathyam =

Writer and poet

Vellala Sathyam was a Kannada writer and poet based in Bangalore. He has written many novels in Kannada, one of them being Mahaatyaagi, based on Charles Dickens' A Tale of Two Cities. His other novel, Dr.Srinath is based on H.G.Wells' The Invisible Man. Nilambari is based on Wilkie Collins novel The Woman In White and 'Chintamani' is based on same author's The Moonstone.

In addition he has indianized many Sir Arthur Conan Doyle's Sherlock Holmes mysteries. Sherlock Holmes becomes Rao and Watson becomes Sathyam.

Vellala Sathyam had an ability to Indianize the western novels.

== Works ==
- Nilambari
- Chintamani or Shaapada Vajra
- Muttabeda Joke
- Shista Chatustaya
- Maha Prayoga
- Sallapa
- Sringara Lahari
- Mahaatyaagi
- Dr.Srinath
- Onde Rathriyalli
- Mrityu Sandesha mattu Sarpastra
- Sanchu mattu Koleyadavaru yaaru
- Mrityu Samputa
- Sudhamayi
- Kempina Motte
- Sanchu
- Kempina Motte mattu Ashubhasya sheeghram
- Sringara Rasaraatrigalu
- Sookti Sudha

== Adaptations of novels in cinema ==
- Digbandana – A Kannada movie released on 2002 based on Onde Rathriyalli
