= C. P. Siddhashrama =

Indian academic, writer, poet, scholar

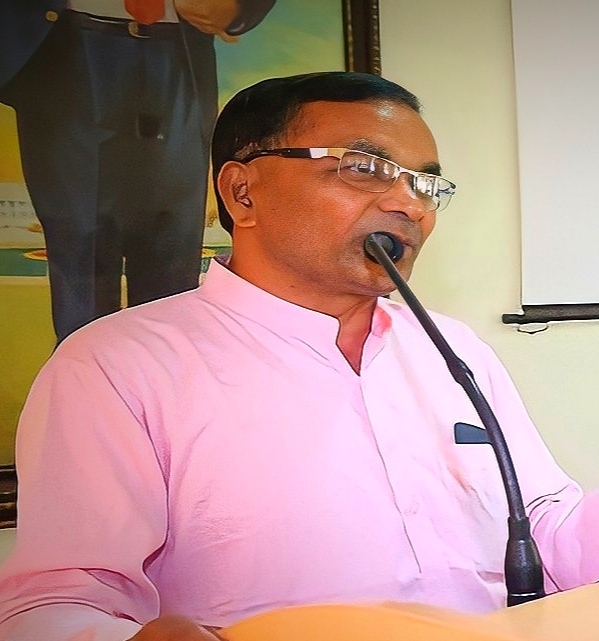
- Prof. Siddhashrama delivering lecture at Kuvempu Institute of Kannada Studies, Mysore University
- Born: 1 May 1954 (age 72); Hullambi, Dharwad district, Mysore State (present–day Karnataka), India
- Occupations: Professor; researcher; poet; scholar; writer; critic
- Writing career
- Language: Kannada
- Genres: Poetry; research; criticism
- Subjects: Kannada literature; Social life

Chidananda Parasappa Siddhashrama known as CPS or Prof. Siddhashrama, is an Indian academic, writer, critic, and poet who is known for his works in Kannada. He is a retired professor of Mysore University where he served as the acting Vice Chancellor. In 2020, for his contributions to the field of literature, Siddhashrama has been awarded the Karnataka Rajyotsava Award by Government of Karnataka.

== Career ==
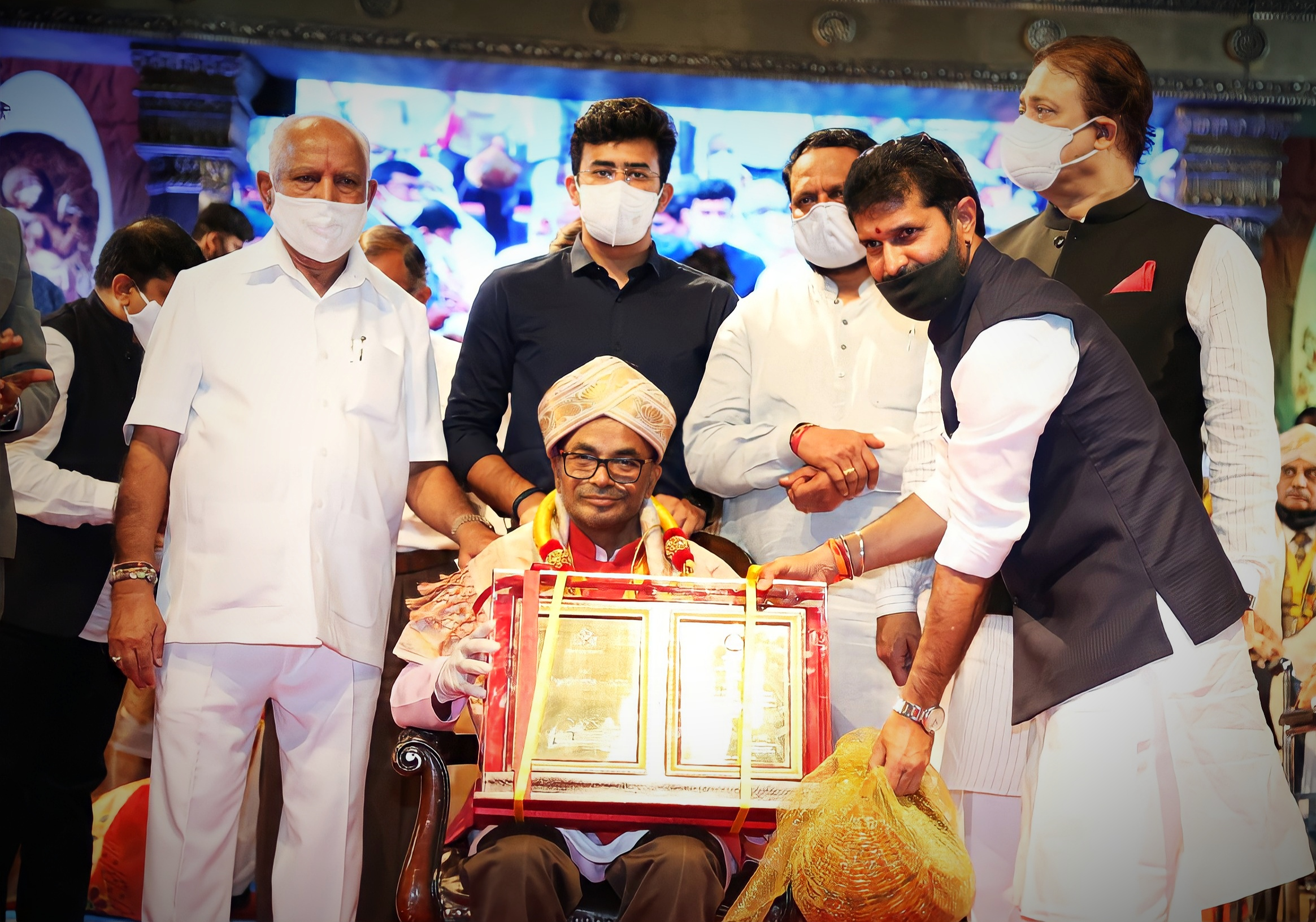
The Chief Minister is presenting Rajyotsava Award to Prof. CPS

As academic

Siddhashrama served as a Kannada professor in Mysore university's Kuvempu Institution for Kannada Studies, where he was also the director of the institution. He served as the acting Vice Chancellor of the university.

As writer

He is known for his works in literary criticism and research. His works on Old and Medieval Kannada literature are noted. His critical work on modern Kannada literature 'Hosa Ale: Sahitya Vimarshe' was published in 1978. His other works including 'Shodha Sampada' and 'Mastiyavara Kavya: Ondu Adhyayana'.

== Literary works ==
Criticism

- Hosa Ale (1978)
- Holahu
- Nikasha
- Ditada Dittiya Payana
- Devanura Mahadeva Sahityada Olanota
- Asmithe
- Vilanghana
- Kannada Sahitya Mattu Vishwapragne
- Ambigara Chowdaiah
- Kannada Kavya Vichara
- Sahitya Viveka
- Sahitya Shikharagalu
- Seemaatheetha

Research

- Mastiyavara Kavya: Ondu Adhyayana (1992)
- Paarangatha
- Shodha Sampada
- L. Basavaraju Avara Jeevana Mattu Sahitya Vimarshe (2005)

Collection of poems

- Mugila Mareya Nesara
- Jaagarada Jangama
- Kavyamandara (ed)

Autobiography

- Naanallada Nanu (2016)

== Accolades ==
- 2020 - Karnataka Rajyotsava Award
- ‛Harigolu’ - a felicitation volume, dedicated by writers.

== See also ==
- Aravinda Malagatti
- L. Basavaraju
- Keertinath Kurtakoti
- Siddalingaiah
- Jayalakshmi Seethapura
- C. P. Krishnakumar
