= C. P. Krishnakumar =

Indian academic, writer, poet, scholar

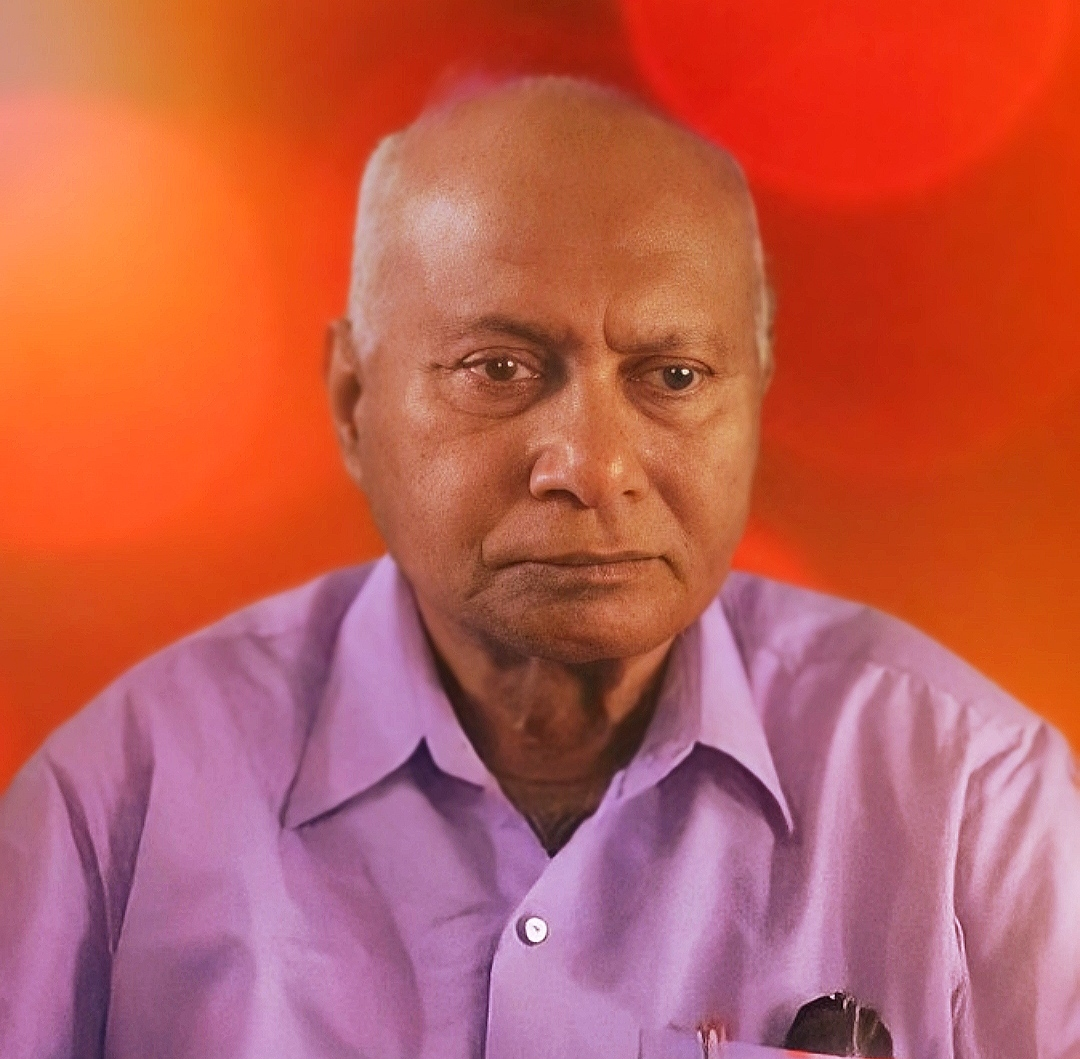
- Born: April 8, 1939 (age 87); Chikkanayakanahalli, K. R. Nagara, Mysore, Karnataka
- Education: Mysore University
- Occupations: Professor; researcher; poet; scholar; writer; critic
- Writing career
- Pen name: CPK
- Language: Kannada
- Genres: Poetry; research; criticism
- Subjects: Kannada literature; Social life

Chikkanayakanahalli Puttegowda Krishnakumar (nee Kunasingri)(born 8 April 1939), commonly known as C. P. Krishnakumar or CPK, is an Indian academic, writer, poet, folklorist, critic and translator in Kannada. CPK has published more than 100 literary works in different genres including poetry, criticism, translation. He was the president at the 78th Kannada Sahitya Sammelana held in Gangavati in 2011.

== Early life ==
Krishnakumar was born as 'Kunasingrigowda' on 8 April 1939 in Chikkanayakanahalli, a village in Mysore to Puttegowda and Chikkamma.

== Career ==
As academic

CPK served as professor in Mysore University and became the director of the Institution for Kannada Studies.

As writer

CPK is known for his wide range of literary works from poems to translation. His poem collections including Oladani, Nimage Nive Dikku based on the subjects of human relations and social conditions.

CPK is a noted translator for his translation works from Kannada to other languages such as Sanskrit and English and vice versa.

== Literary works ==
Poetry

- Thaarasakha
- Oladani
- Anatha-Prithvi
- Hanimini
- Bogase
- Antharathama (vachana)

Essay

- Chintanabindu
- Meluku

Criticism & Research

- Adhyayana
- Aalochana
- Upachaya
- Kavyatathva: Kelavu Mukhagalu
- Kumaravyasa virachita: Gadugina Bhaaratha

Folklore

- Janapada Sahitya Praveshika
- Jaanapada Saraswathi

Edition

- Aayda Kuvempu Kavanagalu
- Kattimani: Baduku-Baraha

== Accolades ==
- 2010 - Nrupatunga Award
- Dakshina Kesari Award - for his work "Chintana Chintamani"
- 1996 - Karnataka Rajyotsava Award by Government of Karnataka

== See also ==
- Javaregowda
- K. S. Bhagawan
- C. P. Siddhashrama
- Vijaya Dabbe
