= Vaddaradhane =

Prose work in Kannada

Information
- Religion: Jainism
- Author: Sivakotiacharya
- Period: 6th to 9th century

Vaddaradhane by Sivakotiacharya is the earliest extant prose work in Kannada. It is a didactic work consisting of nineteen stories and is based on Harisena's Brhatkathakosa. The work is also known for mentioning the precursor to modern idli called iddalige prepared using black gram batter.

== Description ==
It gives a detailed description of the life of Bhadrabahu of Shravanabelagola. The work is dated to the 9th century but some scholars advance a pre-sixth century date for the work. Based on internal evidence, it is suggested that Sivakotiacharya may have been a native of Kogali, in the Bellary district of modern Karnataka.

The list of 19 stories are

1. Story of Sukumara swamy
2. Story of SukaushaLa swamy
3. Gajakumara
4. Sanathkumara prince
5. Annii kavrutha
6. Bhadrabhau bhatarara
7. Lalithaghate
8. Dharmaghosha
9. Siridhinnia bhatarara
10. Vrushabha sena bhatarara
11. Karthika rishi
12. Abhayaghosha rishi
13. Vidyuthchoraa rishi
14. Gurudatta bhatarara
15. Chilata putra
16. Dandaka rishi
17. Mahendradattacharyaand
18. Chanakya rishi
19. Vrushabhasena rishi
