= Devara Dasimayya =

Indian poet

Devara Daasimayya, was an Indian mid-11th century poet and vachanakaara in Kannada. He was born in Mudanuru, a village in Shorapur Taluk, Yadagiri district in Karnataka. A weaver by profession, his village had a Ramanatha temple among its many temples, dedicated to Shiva as worshiped by Rama. That is why Dasimayya's pen name (ankita nama) is Ramanatha, meaning Rama's Lord, i.e. Shiva.

Dasimayya's vachanas are dedicated to Ramanatha. He was one of the earliest propagator of Hinduism in India. He was a staunch worshipper of Shiva.

According to the legend, Dasimayya was performing intense ascetic practices in a jungle, when he claimed Shiva appeared to him. He allegedly told him to work in the practical world. As a result, Dasimayya renounced his practices and took up the trade of a weaver. He is also known as Jedara Dasimayya, "Dasimayya of the weavers". Today there is a large community of weavers called Devanga spread across the southern states of India who follow devara Dasimayya.

Today, popular tradition identifies several places where Dasimayya set up his weaver's looms in Mudanuru.

Dasimayya married Duggale, who grew up in Shivapura. He later became a teacher, eventually giving initiation to the wife of the local Chalukya king Jayasimha, Suggale.

A street in Bengaluru has been renamed after Dasimayya. After much opposition from Indian National Congress, on 12th October 2022, Jumma Masjid Street in the heart of Bengaluru was renamed "Sree Devara Dasimayya Road".
