= Sivakotiacharya =

Indian writer

Śivakotiacharya

Personal life
- Era: 9th–10th century CE
- Notable work: Vaddaradhane
- Occupation: Jain monk, writer, scholar

Religious life
- Religion: Jainism
- Sect: Digambar

Śivakotiacharya (also spelled Acharya Śivakoti or Śivakotyacharya) was a Digambara Jain monk, writer, and scholar active around the 9th-10th century CE. A prose narrative written in pre-Old-Kannada (Purva Halegannada), Vaddaradhane, is considered the earliest extant work in the prose genre in the Kannada language.Scholars are, however, still divided about when exactly the text was written, with claims ranging from before the 6th century to the 10th century. Śivakotiacharya flourished under the patronage of the Western Ganga dynasty and Rashtrakuta Empire who were staunch follower of Jainism.

Vaddaradhane consists of nineteen stories that illustrate Jain ideals such as karma, rebirth, and moral conduct, while also reflecting the social, economic, and urban conditions of early medieval Karnataka. The work is also significant for its contribution to early Kannada narrative literature and Jain cultural history.

== Content ==
According to the scholar R.S. Mugali, Vaddaradhane is one of the finest pieces of Jain literature, which stands out by itself in all of Kannada literature. In addition to religious content describing the lives of Jain saints (Jainas), it treats on Jain tenets regarding the torments of flesh and spirit, interpretations of fate (karma), rebirth and the plight of humans on earth. The text gives useful information about contemporary society including education, trade and commerce, magic and superstitions, the caste system and untouchability, and position of women in society. The text provides details on contemporary urban and rural society: towns with majestic buildings and multi-storied houses; temples (devalaya); a street for the prostitutes (sulegeri); palaces; streets with people, horses and elephants; homes of cloth merchants (dusigar); homes of diamond merchants (baccara); feudatories (samanta); royal officials (niyogi); grain markets and traders; and various types of settlements such as villages (grama) and towns (nagara). The text dwells on the evils of Kali Yuga including miscegenation and takes a critical look at contemporary Brahmin practices. It mentions fierce warriors, royal retainers (velevali) who were under oath to lay down their life for the king and royalty.

== Date controversies ==
The dating of the work and its authorship has been a controversy. According to the scholar R.S. Mugali, experts are not unanimous whether the prose piece was written before Kavirajamarga (ca. 850) or after. According to modern Kannada poet and scholar M. Govinda Pai, the Vaddaradhane dates much further back. Based on his studies of the text and some pre-2nd century inscriptions from Shravanabelagola, Pai authored two scholarly publications in 1960: Kannada Sahityada Halame ("Antiquity of Kannada literature") and Kannada Sahityada Prachinate (also meaning "Antiquity of Kannada literature"), in which he argued Vaddaradhane more accurately dates to the pre-6th century period. However, the scholar D.L. Narasimhachar opines that the writing is from around c. 920. Professor Upadhye dates the writing to the post-9th century period while the historians A.R. Naronakar, K.A.N. Shastri, and Dravidian scholar Zvelebil date it to c. 900.

There is an opinion that Sivakoti was not the author of the work, and that his Prakrit work Bhagavati Aaradhane may have been the inspiration for this Kannada writing. However, it has been pointed out that the author's name appears in the concluding section of every story in the writing, and that the Prakrit writer, also named Sivakoti, lived in the 2nd or 3rd century A.D. and was the disciple of Acharya Samantabhadra. Another name, Revakotiacharya, also appears in some places in the Kannada text. Historian Jyotsna Kamat is of the opinion that the didactic work comprising 19 stories dates to the 10th century and was inspired by the Sanskrit writing Brihatkatha-Khosa.

== See also ==
- Jainism in Karnataka
- Jainism in north Karnataka
- Jainism in Tulu Nadu
