= Vijaya Dabbe =

Indian writer, feminist, and scholar (1951–2018)

- Born: Vijaya; 1 June 1951; Dabbe, Belur, Karnataka, India
- Died: 23 February 2018 (aged 66); Mysore, Karnataka, India
- Occupations: Professor; researcher; poet; scholar; writer; critic
- Parent(s): Seethalakshmi (mother); Krishnamurthy (father)
- Writing career
- Language: Kannada
- Genres: Poetry; travelogue; translation; research; criticism
- Subjects: Feminism; modern women literature
- Movement: Feminist movement in Karnataka

Vijaya Dabbe (1 June 1951 – 23 February 2018) was an Indian writer, feminist, scholar and critic in Kannada language. Often credited as the first feminist writer in modern Kannada language, Dabbe was one of the prominent figures in feminist movement in Karnataka.

== Personal life ==
Vijaya was born on 1 June 1951 in Dabbe village of Belur taluk, to Krishnamurthy and Seethalakshmi. She finished her schooling in Kalasapura and Javagal, later moved to Hassan and Mysuru to do higher education. She served as Kannada faculty member at Mysore University.

== Career ==
As writer

Dabbe's first noted literary work was ‛Irutthave’ (lit. 'They Exist'), a collection of poems, published in 1975. Her other important works including ‛Neeru Lohada Chinte’ (lit. 'The Worries of Water and Metal') (1985) and ’Naari Daari Digantha’ and so on. Most of her works are women centric.

Feminist movement

Vijaya Dabbe was one of the founders of ‛Samatha Vedike’, instituted in 1978, a group of women writers and activists who have been working to spread awareness about gender equality, family atrocities on women, dowry, child marriage, other caste based discrimination and social injustice for the depressed classes, especially women. Dabbe was the front face in leading these activities through her poems, articles, workshops, literary meetings and social works all over Karnataka.

"Be fearless.
Never worry.
As long as you dont
lift up your heads
men will surround you, guard you
as if they were your eyes."

(From Vijaya Dabbe’s poem "Naarimanige Ondu Kivimatu" (Advice to Gentlewomen).

== Literary works ==
Poetry

1. Irutthave (1975)
2. Neeru Lohada Chinte(1985)
3. Ithigeethike (1995)
4. Tirugi Nintha Prashne (1995)

Research

1. Nagachandra - Ondu Adhyayana (1983)
2. Nayasena
3. Hithaishiya Hejjegalu (1992)
4. Saarasaraswathi (1996)
5. Hithophia Hejjegalu

Travelogue

1. Uriya Chigura Uthkale (1999)

Criticism

1. Mahila Sahitya Samaja (1986)
2. Naari Daari Digantha (1996)
3. Mahila mattu Maanavate
4. Samprati (1977)

Translation

1. Meri Mekliyath Bethone
2. Vimochaneyedege (with B. N. Sumitrabai, 1986)
3. Gurujaada (1986)

== Awards ==
1. 2008 - Rajyotsava Prashasti by Government of Karnataka
2. 2008 - Daana Chintamani Attimabbe Award by Government of Karnataka
3. Anumapama Award by Karnataka Lekhakiyara Sangha
4. ‛Vardhamana Award’

== Death ==
Vijaya Dabbe became inactive after she met with a road accident on 6 January in 1999. She died in Mysuru on 23 February 2018, due to cardiac arrest.
