= Medieval Kannada literature =

7th to 16th centuries Kannada literature

Medieval Kannada literature covered a wide range of subjects and genres which can broadly be classified under the Jain, Virashaiva, Vaishnava and secular traditions. These include writings from the 7th century rise of the Badami Chalukya empire to the 16th century, coinciding with the decline of Vijayanagara Empire. The earliest known literary works until about the 12th century CE were mostly authored by the Jainas along with a few works by Virashaivas and Brahmins and hence this period is called the age of Jain literature, . The 13th century CE, to the 15th century CE, saw the emergence of numerous Virashaiva and Brahminical writers with a proportional decline in Jain literary works. Thereafter, Virashaiva and Brahmin writers have dominated the Kannada literary tradition. Some of the earliest metres used by Jain writers prior to 9th century include the chattana, bedande and the melvadu metres, writings in which have not been discovered but are known from references made to them in later centuries. Popular metres from the 9th century onwards when Kannada literature is available are the champu-kavyas or just champu, vachana sangatya, shatpadi, ragale, tripadi, and kavya.

The Jain scholars wrote mostly about the life of Tirthankars and about princes and persons who attained sainthood. These writings are called Jain puranas. Virashaiva works centered on the Hindu god Shiva, his various forms and his saintly devotees. A unique and native form of poetry called Vachana sahitya was born in the 12th century CE, as a reaction to the rigid social customs prevailing at that time. This form of poetry in pithy prose was heralded by the Virashaiva saints and remains popular even today. Brahminical writings were on the Vaishnava Hindu epics, the Ramayana, the Mahabharata, the Bhagavata, the Puranas and subjects bearing on the Vedas. Another devotional movement, inspired by the teachings of Madhwacharya heralded by Vaishnava saints ushered in a form of Kannada literature called the Haridasa sahitya (literature of slaves of god) in the 14th century CE, and resulted in the production of a vast corpus of devotional compositions over the next four centuries. A vast amount of literature came to be written on non-religious subjects generally classified as secular literature. Secular literatures were on such subjects as grammar (sabdagama), logic (yuktyagama), philosophy (paramagama), poetry, romance, drama, rhetoric, prosody, lexicon, biography, history, medicine, veterinary science, mathematics, poetic inscriptions called kavya, cookery, fiction, astrology, meteorology, toxicology, eroticism etc.

== Early literature ==
The verse form of inscriptions were popular in the 7th century and the Shravanabelagola inscription of Nandisena (7th century), and the Kappe Arabhatta record of 700 in tripadi metre is considered the earliest available lithic records of Kannada poetry. The Karnateshwara Katha, which was quoted later by Jayakirti, must have belonged to the period and was a eulogy of Pulakeshin II. Other Kannada writers of this time whose works are considered extinct are Syamakundacharya (650) who wrote Prabhrita and Srivaradhadeva, also called Tumubuluracharya (650) who wrote the Chudamani (Crest Jewel), a 96,000 verse commentary on logic (Tattvartha-mahashastra). Other sources date the Chudamani to the 6th century or earlier. Bhattakalanka, a 17th-century Kannada grammarian, wrote of the Chudamini being a milestone which demonstrated that Kannada was well suited for scientific works. Gajashtaka, a rare work on elephant management was written by the Western Ganga King Shivamara II around 800 but is now considered extinct. Around 900, Gunavarma I authored the Shudraka and Harivamsha. His writings are considered extinct but references to these writings are found in later years. He is known to have been patronised by King Ereganga Neetimarga II. In Shudraka, he has favourably compared his patron to King Shudraka of ancient times. Sri Vijaya, court poet of Rashtrakuta King Amoghavarsha I wrote Chandraprabha-purana in the early 9th century. A prosody called Guna-gankiyam has been referenced in a Tamil work called Yapparungalakkarigai by Amritasagara and has been dated to the middle of the 9th century.

Kavirajamarga (850) written by King Amoghavarsha I and Sri vijaya is the earliest available book on rhetoric and poetics, though it is evident from the book that several works and metres of Kannada literature and poetry had existed in previous centuries. Kavirajamarga is a guide to poets (Kavishiksha) that aims to standardize these various styles. The book refers to early Kannada writers such as the 6th century Western Ganga Dynasty King Durvinita, a writer of prose. Hence it is proposed that a considerable volume of prose and poetry must have come into existence prior to 850. Other writers mentioned in Kavirajamarga are Vimala, Udaya, Nagarjuna, Jayabhandu for Kannada prose and Ravikirti (636), Kavisvara, Pandita, Chandra and Lokapala in Kannada poetry.

== Jain literature ==
10th century Kannada writer Chavundaraya with Nemichandra, © Kamat's Potpourri

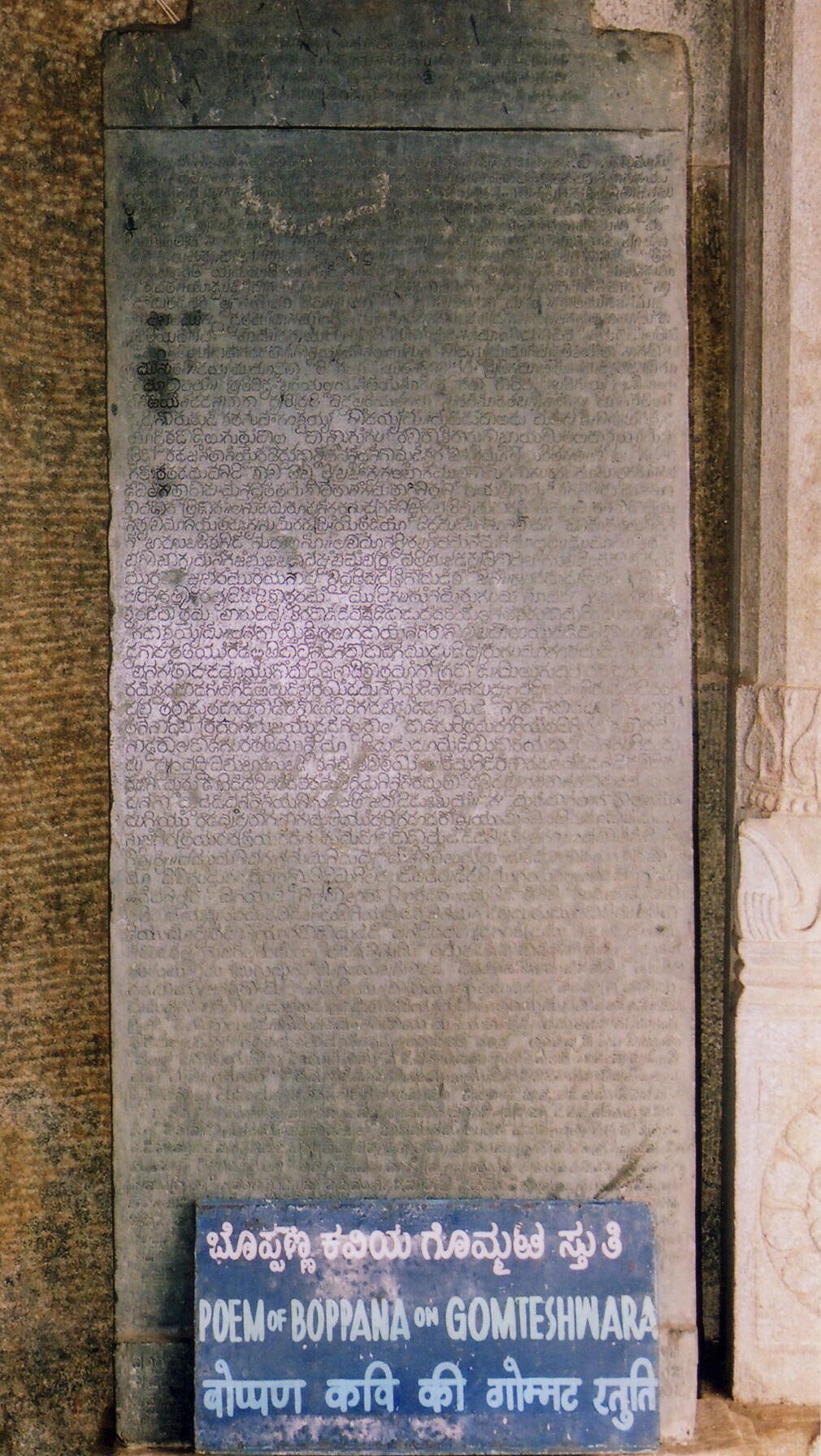
Poetic Inscription in old Kannada by Jain poet Boppana (1180 CE) at Shravanabelagola

The Jain age of literature in Kannada has been called as the "Augustan age" of Kannada literature with writings of nearly 200 authors considered important. Jain authors in Kannada are far more than in Tamil or Telugu languages. Kannada is the only language in which a Jain version of Ramayana and Mahabharata exists, in addition to Brahminical version of the same epics. Famous among Jain writers were Adikavi Pampa, Sri Ponna, Chavundaraya, Ranna, Gunavarma I, Nagachandra, Nayasena, Nagavarma I, Aggala, Janna etc. Adikavi Pampa, widely regarded as one of the greatest Kannada writers, became famous for his purana, Adipurana (941). Written in champu style, it is the life history of the first Jain thirtankar Rishabhadeva. Pampa's other notable work was Vikramarjuna Vijaya (941), is a Jain version of the Hindu epic, Mahabharata, with Arjuna as the hero. Also called Pampa Bharata, it praises the writer's patron, King Chalukya Arikeseri of Vemulavada (a Rashtrakuta feudatory), comparing the king's virtues favorably to those of Arjuna. Pampa demonstrates such a command of classical Kannada that scholars over the centuries have written many interpretations of his work.

Pampa's contemporary was Sri Ponna, the court poet of Rashtrakuta king Krishna III. He received the title Kavichakravarthi (poet laureate) and Ubhaya-Chakravarthi (imperial poet in two languages, for his command over Sanskrit as well) from his patron. He became famous for his Santipurana written around 950, narrating the life history of the 16th tirthankar Santinatha. Other classics by Sri Ponna are Jinaksharamale, a poem in praise of Jainas and Bhuvanai-karamabhyudaya, the later considered extinct but known from citations in later works. Ranna was the court poet of Western Chalukya kings Tailapa II and Satyashraya. He along with Pampa and Sri Ponna are called the "three gems of Kannada literature". Ranna wrote Ajitapurana in 993, a champu writing in 12 chapters on the life of the second tirthankar. His other classics are Sahasabhimavijaya (or Gadayuddha) written in 982, a champu writing in 10 chapters which narrates the story of the epic Mahabharata with particular reference to the duel with clubs between Pandava Bhima and Kaurava Duryodhana. In this writing, the poet favourably compares his patron king Satyashraya to Sahasabhima (daring Bhima). Earlier to this, Ranna was patronised by Western Ganga minister Chavundaraya when he wrote Parashurama charita, in which he compares his patron to Parashurama.

In 1105, Nagachandra, a poet and builder in the court of Hoysala Veera Ballala I who was responsible for the consecration of important Jain temples (Jainalaya) wrote the Jain version of Ramayana called Ramachandra-charitapurana. The story which deviates from the Valmiki Ramayana narrates the legend of Rama in a champu of 16 sections. In this work, Rama becomes a Jain ascetic and attains nirvana at the end. A complement to Pampa Bharata by Adikavi Pampa, the effort earned Nagachandra the title Abhinava Pampa. The earliest available prose in Kannada is Vaddaradhane (900) by Shivakotiacharya. The title means "worship of elders". The writing contains 19 stories mostly borrowed from the Sanskrit book Brihatkatha-Kosha and is about Jain tenets. The writing describes issues such as rebirth, karma, plight of humans on earth, social issues of the time such as education, trade and commerce, magic, superstitions and condition of women in society. Janna who was given the title Kavichakravarti (poet laureate) in the court of Hoysala Veera Ballala II was also a minister, builder of many Jain temples and came from a family of such famous writers of the Hoysala court as Sumanobana and Mallikarjuna. His Yasodhara charita (1209) and Ananthanathapurana (1230) are considered to be enduring classics. The former work narrates the story of a king who was about to sacrifice two boys to a local deity called Mariamma. On hearing their story, the king releases the boys and gives up the practice of sacrificing live victims.

In the early 13th century, Andayya wrote the Madana Vijaya (also known as Kavana Gella – victory of Kama or Kabbigara Kava – poets defender or Sobagina Suggi – harvest of beauty). In this unique work, Andayya used only indigenous Kannada words (desya) and naturalised Sanskrit words (tatbhava) totally avoiding assimilated Sanskrit words (tatsamas). In the story, Shiva imprisons the moon and cupid (Kama) in his anger assails Shiva with his arrows. An angry Shiva curses cupid to be separated from his bride, when cupid contrives to free himself of the curse.

== Virashaiva literature ==
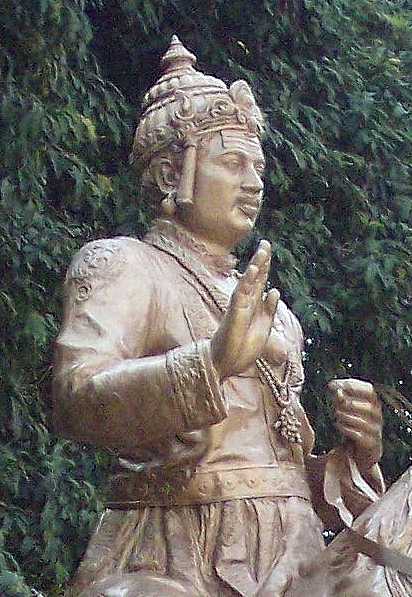
Statue of Basavanna in Bangalore

Among early Shaiva writers Durgasimha who wrote Panchatantra in 1025. He was a minister in the court of Western Chalukya King Jayasimha II. Here he mentions many of his predecessors and contemporaries. Harihara, (also known as Harisvara) was patronised by Hoysala King Narasimha I and wrote the Girijakalyana (1165) in the old champu style describing the marriage of Shiva and Parvati in ten sections. He came from a family of accountants (karanikas) from Halebidu and spent many years in Hampi writing more than one hundred ragales (poems in blank verse) in praise of Virupaksha (a form of Shiva). Raghavanka was the first to introduce the Shatpadi metre into Kannada in his Harishchandra kavya (1165) which is considered a classic even though it occasionally violates strict rules of Kannada grammar.

Prose was the medium chosen by the Virashaiva poets (also known as Lingayat) to write devotional poetry called Vachana Sahitya in the 12th century. They were led by such great saints as Basavanna (a minister in the court of Southern Kalachuri King Bijjala II), Akka Mahadevi and Allama Prabhu. Over 200 Vachana poets (Vachanakara) have been recorded from this period, more than 30 of whom were woman poets. Vachanas are characterized as brief disconnected passages, each ending with one or more names of Shiva. The style was epigrammatical, parallelistic and elusive, dwelling on the vanity of riches and spiritual benefits of the worship of Shiva. These poems are still recited by Lingayat acharyas (priests). The poems have a section called Kalanjnana with a messianic forecast of the future mentioning the arrival of the ideal King Vira Vasanta Raya who would rebuild Kalyani, the geographical centre of the Lingayat movement and restore the Lingayat sect to its full glory. Other famous teachers were Sivalenka, Sripati Pandita, Mallikarjuna Panditaradhya. The five famous acharyas were Revanna Siddha, Marula Siddha, Panditaradhya, Ekorami Tande and Visvesvaracharya. Well-known vachana writers of the time were Chennabasava, Prabhudeva, Siddharama, Kondaguli Kesiraja etc.

== Vaishnava literature ==
Rudrabhatta, a Smartha Brahmin (believer of monistic philosophy), was an early Brahminical writer whose patron was Chandramouli, a minister of Hoysala King Veera Ballala II. Based on the earlier work of Vishnu Purana, he wrote Jagannatha Vijaya (1180) in the champu style relating the life of Krishna leading up to his fight with the demon Banasura. Famous among Brahmin writers from the 15th century was Kumara Vyasa. His real name was Naranappa and hailed from modern Gadag district in Karnataka. He wrote the first ten chapters of Gadugina Bharata (1430), a Kannada adaptation of epic Mahabharata in the court of Deva Raya II. The work was later completed by Thimmanna in the court of King Krishnadevaraya. Dedicating the work to his patron king, Thimmanna called it Krishnaraya Bharata. In the 15th century, Narahari wrote the earliest brahminical rendering of the epic Ramayana in Kannada called Torave Ramayana. It is called so because it was written in Torave, Sholapur District, modern Maharashtra.

The Vaishnava Bhakti (devotion) influence on Kannada literature was acute from the time of Vijayanagara Empire, a direct impact of the dvaita philosophy propounded by Madhwacharya of Udupi in the 13th century. Over 150 well-known bhakti saints who wrote thousands of compositions are known. These compositions are broadly classified as general compositions, kavya (poetic compositions) and tatva (philosophical compositions). General compositions are further classified as keertanas, ughabhogas, suladis, vruttanama, dandaka, tripadi, pattadi, sangathya and ragale. The period between the 14th century to 16th century produced the first wave of devotional literature called the Haridasa sahitya (literature). Vyasatirtha who composed songs in praise of Krishna, Purandara Dasa whose compositions marked his devotion to Purandara Vittala (a form of Vishnu) and Kanaka Dasa who praised Adikeshava (a form of Krishna) in his poems were the great trinity of Vaishnava composers in Kannada. The contribution of Purandara Dasa to Carnatic music is immeasurable, and he is called the "Karnataka sangeeta pitamaha" (Father of Carnatic Music). Historians propose the number of his compositions were as many as 75,000–475,000 songs in Kannada and Sanskrit language, though only few hundreds are available today. He codified and consolidated the school of Carnatic music by evolving several steps like sarali, jantai, thattu varisai, alankara and geetham and laid down a framework for imparting formal training in this art form. He became an inspiration to later day Carnatic composers.

Saint Kanaka Dasa of Kaginele in modern Haveri district, who from various accounts belonged either to the community of shepherds (kuruba) or hunters (beda) or warriors (kshatriya) is an example of a non-Brahmin composer who made significant contribution to the bhakti (devotion) movement. Apart from his 200 compositions, he authored important works namely; Nalacharitre (story of Nala) and Haribhaktisara (devotion to Krishna in a book of morals for children) in shatpadi metre, Nrisimhastava (compositions in praise of Narasimha, an Avatar of Vishnu), Ramadhanyacharite (which narrates the superiority of the ragi millet over other grains in a book meant to address class inequalities) and Mohanatarangini (river of delight) which is a poem in kavya (poetic) style narration of stories of Krishna in sangatya metre.

== Secular literature ==
Kannada literary works treating algebra, arithmetic and geometry have been written by Rajaditya, Bhaskaracharya of Bijapur, Thimmarasa and others. The 9th century mathematician Mahaviracharya, a native of Gulbarga, was patronised by the Rashtrakuta king Amoghavarsha I. Commentaries on the theories in his ganitasarasangraha (a Sanskrit work) were later translated to Kannada. Rajaditya (1190) showed skill in reducing to easy verse the mathematical subjects (ganita) in his writings called Vyavahara-ganita, Kshetraganita and Lilavati. In the court of Hoysala Veera Ballala III, Ratta Kavi (1300) wrote Rattamala and Rattasutra bearing on the subjects of natural phenomena such as rain, lightning, earthquakes, planets and omens. The earliest available writing on astrology is Jatakatilaka by Sridharacharya (1049), a Jain who also authored a work on general science called Sastrakavita and was patronised by Western Chalukya King Someshvara I. In the field of medicine, Jagadalla Somanatha's Karnataka-Kalyanakara of 1150 prescribing a totally vegetarian and non-alcoholic diet, a translation of Pujyapada's Sanskrit Kalyanakaraka is the earliest available and is in champu style. Gajanakusha (also known as Gajaga or Narayana) who wrote on erotics in the mid 10th century was a minister in the court of Rashtrakuta King Krishna III, though his works have not come down to us. Chandraraja (1025), who was patronised by Machiraja, a feudatory of Western Chalukya Jayasimha II wrote the earliest available book on erotism called Madanakatilaka, in champu metre in 18 chapters. The writing dwells on the subject as a conversation between the author's patron and his wife.

Govidya is the earliest available writing on veterinary science. It was authored by prince Kirtivarma in 1100 in the court of his brother and the famous Western Chalukya King Vikramaditya VI. Nagavarma I (980), a Brahmin scholar from Vengi in modern Andhra Pradesh who was patronised by Chavundaraya, a Western Ganga minister wrote Chandombudhi (ocean of prosody) addressed to his wife. This is considered the earliest available Kannada writing in prosody. He also wrote one of the earliest available romance classics called Karnataka Kadambari in sweet and flowing champu (mixed verse and prose). It is based on an earlier romance work in Sanskrit by poet Bana and is popular among critics. The earliest known grammarian in Kannada is Nayasena (1112) but his works are considered extinct. Among existing literature, Nagavarma II's Karnataka-bhashabhushana is from 1145. Nagavarma II was the poet laureate in the court of Western Chalukya King Jagadhekamalla II. In this book, the sutras and short explanation are in Sanskrit and the illustrations are from Kannada literature. In 1260, Kesiraja wrote a comprehensive book on Kannada grammar called Sabdamanidarpana (mirror of word jewels). The rules here are set forth in kanda metre and followed by a prose commentary by the author and is considered a writing of high value.

Sisumayana introduced the earliest writings in the sangatya metre in his works Anjanacharita and Tripura-dahana, the later being a poem on the destruction of the triple fortress of birth, decay and death. The earliest known lexicon in Kannada is the Ranna Kanda (990) by the great poet Ranna with each verse ending with kaviratna. Ranna was the poet laureate (Kavichakravarti) of Western Chalukya kings Tailapa II and Satyashraya and was bestowed the royal attributes of golden rod, royal umbrella and an elephant by his patrons. The earliest books on cookery were written by Jayabandhunandana, Mangarasa. A book on toxicology was written by Mangaraja I in 1360 called Khagendramani-darpana. Among fiction writers, Nemichandra who was patronised by Hoysala Veera Ballala II wrote Lilavati in 1170. This story is a romance fiction based on an earlier work in 610 called Vasavadatta by Subhandu with the scene of action in Banavasi. A Kadamba prince and a princess dream of each other, meet after many delays and are finally wedded to live happily ever after. Dramas make their arrival into Kannada literature with Malavi-Madhava by Karnaparya (1140) and Subhadraharana and Prabodhachandra by Kesiraja (1260) being the earliest dramas now considered extinct. Of the once that are available, Mitravinda-govinda by Singararaya (1680) is a Kannada version of Sriharsha's Ratnavali. Writings of local history made their appearance after the fall of Vijayanagara Empire. Some well-known works of history are Maisururajara-charitre, Chikkadevarajavamsavali (17th century), Keladinripavijaya by Linganna, the last book being an important source of information on the origin of Vijayanagara Empire, etc. Among Biographies, Rajanripa-vijaya, Kanthiravanarasaraja-vijaya, Chikkadevaraja-vijaya (17th century) and Bijjalaraya-charite etc., are well-known works.
