= Rudrabhatta =

12th century Kannada poet

- Born: 12th century CE
- Died: 12th or 13th century CE
- Occupations: Poet, Writer
- Works: Jagannatha Vijaya

Noted Kannada poets and writers in Hoysala Empire (1100-1343 CE)
| Nagachandra | 1105 |
| Kanti | 1108 |
| Rajaditya | 12th. c |
| Harihara | 1160–1200 |
| Udayaditya | 1150 |
| Vritta Vilasa | 1160 |
| Kereya Padmarasa | 1165 |
| Nemichandra | 1170 |
| Sumanobana | 1175 |
| Rudrabhatta | 1180 |
| Aggala | 1189 |
| Palkuriki Somanatha | 1195 |
| Sujanottamsa(Boppana) | 1180 |
| Kavi Kama | 12th c. |
| Devakavi | 1200 |
| Raghavanka | 1200–1225 |
| Bhanduvarma | 1200 |
| Balachandra Kavi | 1204 |
| Parsva Pandita | 1205 |
| Maghanandycharya | 1209 |
| Janna | 1209–1230 |
| Puligere Somanatha | 13th c. |
| Hastimalla | 13th c. |
| Chandrama | 13th c. |
| Somaraja | 1222 |
| Gunavarma II | 1235 |
| Polalvadandanatha | 1224 |
| Andayya | 1217–1235 |
| Sisumayana | 1232 |
| Mallikarjuna | 1245 |
| Naraharitirtha | 1281 |
| Kumara Padmarasa | 13th c. |
| Mahabala Kavi | 1254 |
| Kesiraja | 1260 |
| Kumudendu | 1275 |
| Nachiraja | 1300 |
| Ratta Kavi | 1300 |
| Nagaraja | 1331 |
Noted Kannada poets and writers in the Seuna Yadava Kingdom
| Kamalabhava | 1180 |
| Achanna | 1198 |
| Amugideva | 1220 |
| Chaundarasa | 1300 |

Rudrabhatta was a 12th-century Kannada poet in the court of the Hoysala Empire King Veera Ballala II(r.1173–1220 CE). According to Kannada language expert Narasimhacharya, the poet was also patronized by a minister of the King. The literary critic Mukherjee feels that after a century of literary revolution caused by the Veerashaiva poets, a benevolent atmosphere created by the king may have encouraged this Vaishnava writer and poet.

== Magnum opus ==
Rudrabhatta was a Brahmin and a Smartha (believer of monistic philosophy). Based on the Sanskrit classic Vishnu Purana, he wrote the epic Jagannatha Vijaya in the Champu metrical form (mixed prose-verse). The epic kavya (a narrative poem) describes the life of the Hindu god Krishna leading up to his fight with the demon Banasura. In this work, Rudrabhatta envisions the Hindu gods Hari (Vishnu), Hara (Shiva) and Brahma as one composite supreme deity (Parabrahma) who takes the form of the god Krishna (an avatar of Vishnu). According to Dalal, Rudrabhatta influenced later day notable Kannada poets such as Kumaravyasa and Lakshmisha, and Haridasa (carnatic music) composers such as Purandaradasa and Kanakadasa. The Kannada scholar L.S. Sheshagiri Rao feels Rudrabhatta was essentially a poet for the learned classes. However, according to the literary critic Shiva Kumar, though Rudrabhatta's form was ancient, his content is more medieval, making him a poet of transition in Kannada literature. Shiva Prakash and Dalal consider him adept at both the mainstream (marga) and the native (desi) styles of composition. Based on epigraphs from the period of Veera Ballala II, the scholar Narasimhacharya dates Jagannatha Vijaya to about 1180 CE.

According to the scholar Sreekantaiyya, based on internal evidence, the authorship of an important Sanskrit classic called Rasakalika is assignable to Rudrabhatta. According to him, references made by the later day Kannada poet Salva (1550 CE) in his writing Rasaratnakara gives the required evidence. Sreekantaiyya feels the author of a Sanskrit book (on love and aesthetics in poetry) called Sringaratilaka, who goes by the same name, is not the Rudrabhatta of the Hoysala court. According to Dalal, the author of Sringaratilaka belonged to the 10th century and also goes by the name Rudratta. According to Sankaranarayanan, Rudrabhatta's Rasakalika played an important role in the development of Indian aesthetics. It was the source for poet Vidyanatha's work Prataparudriya. The poet Vasudeva quotes from Rasakalika in his comments on the writing Karpurmanjari by Rajasekhara. He feels that today's scholars have not fully recognized the influence of Rudrabhatta of the Hoysala court.

== See also ==
- Hoysala literature
- Kannada literature
