= Andayya =

13th century Kannada poet

- Born: 12th century CE
- Died: 13th century CE
- Occupation: Poet
- Works: Kabbigara Kava

Noted Kannada poets and writers in Hoysala Empire (1100-1343 CE)
Nagachandra	1105
Kanti	1108
Rajaditya	12th. c
Harihara	1160–1200
Udayaditya	1150
Vritta Vilasa	1160
Kereya Padmarasa	1165
Nemichandra	1170
Sumanobana	1175
Rudrabhatta	1180
Aggala	1189
Palkuriki Somanatha	1195
Sujanottamsa(Boppana)	1180
Kavi Kama	12th c.
Devakavi	1200
Raghavanka	1200–1225
Bhanduvarma	1200
Balachandra Kavi	1204
Parsva Pandita	1205
Maghanandycharya	1209
Janna	1209–1230
Puligere Somanatha	13th c.
Hastimalla	13th c.
Chandrama	13th c.
Somaraja	1222
Gunavarma II	1235
Polalvadandanatha	1224
Andayya	1217–1235
Sisumayana	1232
Mallikarjuna	1245
Naraharitirtha	1281
Kumara Padmarasa	13th c.
Mahabala Kavi	1254
Kesiraja	1260
Kumudendu	1275
Nachiraja	1300
Ratta Kavi	1300
Nagaraja	1331
Noted Kannada poets and writers in the Seuna Yadava Kingdom
Kamalabhava	1180
Achanna	1198
Amugideva	1220
Chaundarasa	1300

Andayya (or Andaiah, Āṇḍayya) was a notable 13th-century Kannada writer during the rule of the Hoysala empire. Andayya was a Jain by faith and came from a family of accountants. His most important extant work is the Kabbigara Kava ("Poets' Defender") which also goes by the names Sobagina Suggi ("Harvest of Beauty"), Madana Vijaya ("Triumph of Cupid") or Kavana Gella ("Cupid's Conquest") and was written in the 1217–1235 CE period.

== Vocabulary ==
According to the historian Sastri, this writing is considered important in Medieval Kannada literature for its strict adherence to indigenous (desya) Kannada words and naturalised Sanskrit words (tadbhava) only, avoiding assimilated Sanskrit words (tatsamas) entirely. According to the scholar G. Varadaraja Rao of the Sahitya Akademi, Kannada writers of this time, such as Nayasena (author of Dhramamruta), had already begun avoiding the usage of Sanskrit words in their Kannada writings. In his opinion, Andayya's successful completion of this work furthered that cause and hence is a "great achievement".

== Magnum opus ==
G. Varadaraja Rao is of the opinion that Kabbigara Kava was written for multiple reasons. According to him the writing may have been inspired by the military success of Kadamba king Kamadeva of Banavasi (1130–1217) against the Hoysala king Veera Ballala II. Kama (Cupid), the god of Love, finds an important place in Jain writings and hence Andayya wrote about the victory of Kama over Ishwara (the Hindu God Shiva) in a battle fought in the Himalayas (the abode of Ishwara). Thus he connected a mythological event to a historical one. One of work's alternate names, Kavana Gella, found in the colophon also suggests this. According to the scholar D.R. Nagaraj, the possibility that this writing was yet another subtle weapon in the intensifying conflict between the Jains, who had dominated the Kannada literary culture in the centuries prior, and the growing popularity of the Veerashaivas is not lost on historians. However, he concedes that the influence of Harihara (a Veerashaiva poet) on Andayya is also evident in this work.

Rao believes that the strict adherence to chaste Kannada words and naturalised Sanskrit words may have been Andayya's response to mainstream writers who may have claimed that writing literature in Kannada without using pure Sanskrit words was not possible. This trend, it is known, was started by some authors such as Nayasena (c. 1112) who wrote the Dharmamruta choosing only those Sanskrit words that fit well with the Kannada vocabulary. Andayya made his intention of using only pure Kannada clear, "without flashy Sanskrit", when he called Sanskrit by its Prakrit name "Sakkada". While the Kannada literature of earlier great poets like Adikavi Pampa (c.941) was strongly based on a Sanskritic tradition, Andayya achieved the same goal of writing a classical piece using a different technique, a practice not followed by later generation of Kannada writers.

Kabbigara Kava was written in the champu style (mixed prose-verse) and consists of 272 poems with some prose passages in it. In a deviation from the earlier versions of the story where Kama is burnt to ashes by Ishwara, Andayya gives Kama prominence and makes him victorious in battle with Ishwara, the reason for the contest being the moon that Shiva had taken possession of, but which actually belonged to Kama's army. Andayya further enhances Kama's victory by turning Ishwara in a half woman (Ardhanariswara). Kama for his part, incurs Ishwara's curse and experiences separation from his beloved Rati, is born as a mortal on earth but finally re-unites with Rati after a long separation.

== See also ==
- Jainism in Karnataka
- Jainism in north Karnataka
- Jainism in Tulu Nadu
