= Nagachandra =

12th century Kannada poet

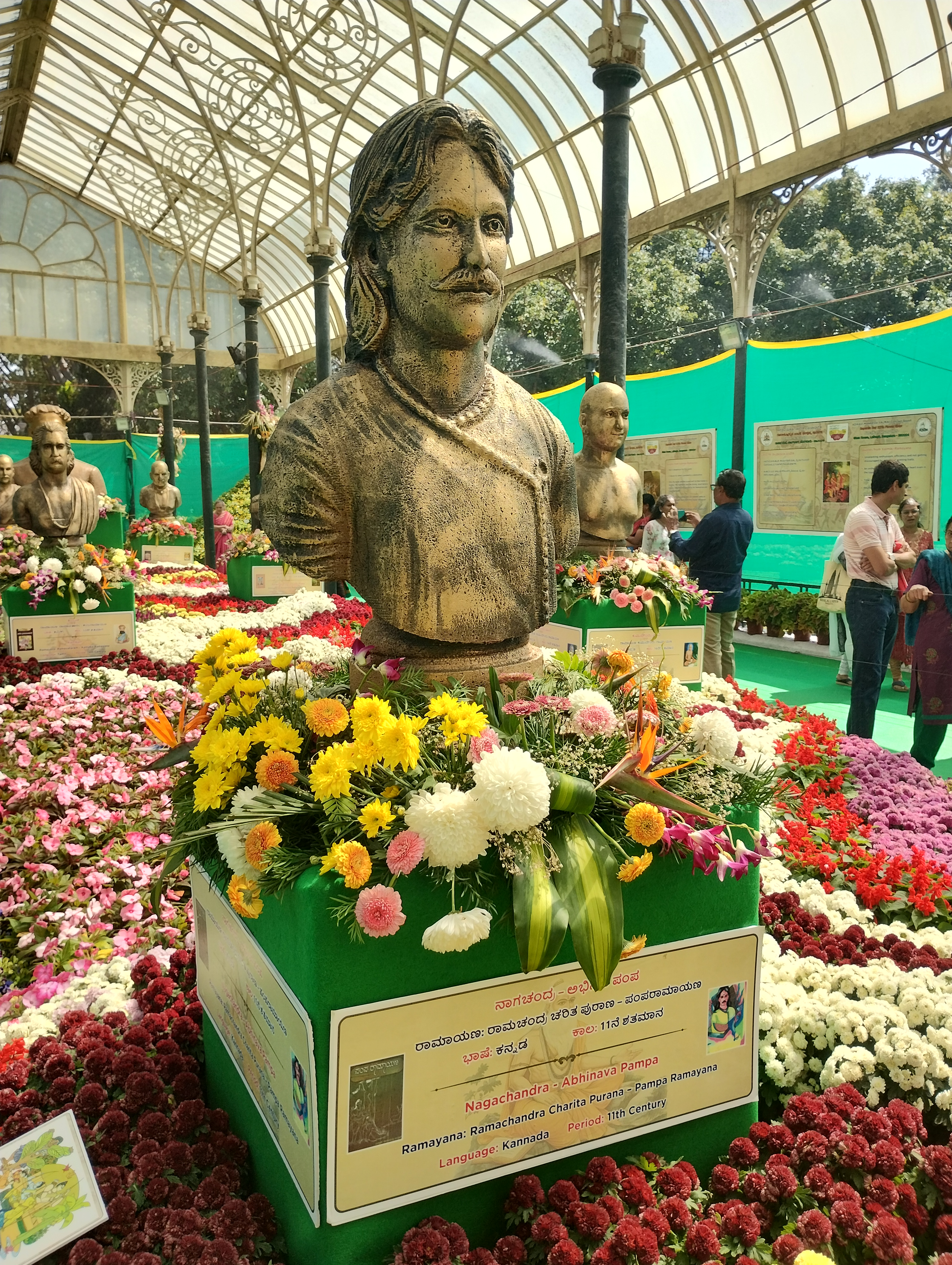
- Sculpture of the poet in Lal Bagh, Bangalore, in January 2025
- Born: 11th century CE
- Died: 12th century CE
- Occupation: Poet
- Works: Mallinatha-Purana, Rama-Chandra-Charita-Purana
- Title: Abhinava Pampa

Noted Kannada poets and writers in Hoysala Empire (1100-1343 CE)
| Nagachandra | 1105 |
| Kanti | 1108 |
| Rajaditya | 12th. c |
| Harihara | 1160–1200 |
| Udayaditya | 1150 |
| Vritta Vilasa | 1160 |
| Kereya Padmarasa | 1165 |
| Nemichandra | 1170 |
| Sumanobana | 1175 |
| Rudrabhatta | 1180 |
| Aggala | 1189 |
| Palkuriki Somanatha | 1195 |
| Sujanottamsa(Boppana) | 1180 |
| Kavi Kama | 12th c. |
| Devakavi | 1200 |
| Raghavanka | 1200–1225 |
| Bhanduvarma | 1200 |
| Balachandra Kavi | 1204 |
| Parsva Pandita | 1205 |
| Maghanandycharya | 1209 |
| Janna | 1209–1230 |
| Puligere Somanatha | 13th c. |
| Hastimalla | 13th c. |
| Chandrama | 13th c. |
| Somaraja | 1222 |
| Gunavarma II | 1235 |
| Polalvadandanatha | 1224 |
| Andayya | 1217–1235 |
| Sisumayana | 1232 |
| Mallikarjuna | 1245 |
| Naraharitirtha | 1281 |
| Kumara Padmarasa | 13th c. |
| Mahabala Kavi | 1254 |
| Kesiraja | 1260 |
| Kumudendu | 1275 |
| Nachiraja | 1300 |
| Ratta Kavi | 1300 |
| Nagaraja | 1331 |
Noted Kannada poets and writers in the Seuna Yadava Kingdom
| Kamalabhava | 1180 |
| Achanna | 1198 |
| Amugideva | 1220 |
| Chaundarasa | 1300 |

Nagachandra or Abhinava Pampa was a 12th-century poet in the Kannada language.

== Biography ==
Nagachandra, a scholar and the builder of the Mallinatha Jinalaya (a Jain temple in honor of the 19th Jain tirthankar, Māllīnātha, in Bijapur, Karnataka), wrote Mallinathapurana (1105), an account of the evolution of the soul of the Jain saint. According to some historians, King Veera Ballala I was his patron.

== Works ==
He wrote his magnum opus, a Jain version of the Hindu epic Ramayana called Ramachandra Charitapurana (or Pampa Ramayana). Written in the traditional champu metre and in the Pauma charia tradition of Vimalasuri, it is the earliest extant version of the epic in the Kannada language. The work contains 16 sections and deviates significantly from the original epic by Valmiki. Nagachandra represents King Ravana, the villain of the Hindu epic, as a tragic hero, who in a moment of weakness commits the sin of abducting Sita (wife of the Hindu god Rama) but is eventually purified by her devotion to Rama. In a further deviation, Rama's loyal brother Lakshmana (instead of Rama) kills Ravana in the final battle. Eventually, Rama takes jaina-diksha (converts to Digambara monk), becomes an ascetic and attains nirvana (enlightenment). Considered a complementary work to the Pampa Bharatha of Adikavi Pampa (941, a Jain version of the epic Mahabharata), the work earned Nagachandra the honorific "Abhinava Pampa" ("new Pampa"). Only in the Kannada language do Jain versions exist of the Hindu epics, the Mahabharata and Ramayana, in addition to their Vedic version.

== Sources ==
- Singh, Upinder (2016), A History of Ancient and Early Medieval India: From the Stone Age to the 12th Century, Pearson Education, ISBN 978-93-325-6996-6
- Narasimhacharya, Ramanujapuram (1988) [1934]. History of Kannada Literature. Mysore: Government Press. Reprinted by Asian Educational Services, New Delhi. ISBN 81-206-0303-6.
- Kamath, Suryanath U. (2001) [1980]. A concise history of Karnataka : from pre-historic times to the present. Bangalore: Jupiter books. LCCN 80905179. OCLC 7796041.
- Sastri, K.A. Nilakanta (2002) [1955]. A history of South India from prehistoric times to the fall of Vijayanagar. New Delhi: Indian Branch, Oxford University Press. ISBN 0-19-560686-8.
- Various (1988) [1988]. Amaresh Datta (ed.). Encyclopaedia of Indian literature – vol 2. Sahitya Akademi. ISBN 81-260-1194-7.
