= Leelavathi =

Leelavathi or Lilavati is a Hindu Indian feminine given name, which means "playful" and "goddess durga".

== People ==
- Leelavathi Govindasamy (1944–2017), Malaysian Politician, Doctor and Humanitarian
- Leelavathi (actress) (1937–2023), a Kannada film actress
- M. Leelavathy (born 1927), Malayalam writer, literary critic, and educationist
- Lilavati of Polonnaruwa, Sinhalese queen in the 13th century

== Other uses ==
- Leelavati Award, an award for outstanding contribution to public outreach in mathematics in India
- Līlāvatī, mathematics book written by ancient Indian mathematician Bhāskara II; also the daughter of Bhāskara II
- Lilavati, ancient Kannada novel in Hoysala literature
- Lilavati Hospital, established 1978, at Bandra, Bombay, India
- Lilavati's Daughters, a 2008 collection of biographical essays on women scientists of India
- Miss Leelavathi, a 1965 Indian Kannada language film directed by M. R. Vittal

== See also ==
- Līlāvatīsāra, a 13th-century poem composed by Jinaratna
- Sathi Leelavathi (disambiguation)
