= Kesiraja =

13th-century Kannada poet and writer

- Born: 13th century CE
- Died: 13th or 14th century CE
- Occupations: Kannada grammarian, Jain poet and writer
- Works: Shabdamanidarpana
- Father: Mallikarjuna
- Family: Janna

Kēśirāja, also spelled Keshiraja, was a 13th-century Kannada grammarian, Jain poet and writer. and nephew of the famous Janna. Kēśirāja is particularly known for composing Shabdamanidarpana, an authoritative work on Kannada grammar. According to the Sanskritist Sheldon Pollock, because of this work he is considered the "greatest theorist of Kannada grammar". He was also a scholar in Sanskrit as well and a court poet (Aasthaana kavi) in the Hoysala Court.

== Early life ==
Kēśirāja was born in a literary Jain family, comprising several well-known Kannada writers. His father, Mallikarjuna (C. 1245 CE), was a Kannada poet. His maternal uncle was the epic writer Janna. Kesiraja's maternal grandfather was another noted poet,Sumanōbana (Śankara), who was a priest of the Yadava capital and poet laureate to Hoysala King Narasimha I. In some of his works, Kesiraja has referred to himself as Keśava.

Noted Kannada poets and writers in Hoysala Empire (1100-1343 CE)
Nagachandra	1105
Kanti	1108
Rajaditya	12th. c
Harihara	1160–1200
Udayaditya	1150
Vritta Vilasa	1160
Kereya Padmarasa	1165
Nemichandra	1170
Sumanobana	1175
Rudrabhatta	1180
Aggala	1189
Palkuriki Somanatha	1195
Sujanottamsa(Boppana)	1180
Kavi Kama	12th c.
Devakavi	1200
Raghavanka	1200–1225
Bhanduvarma	1200
Balachandra Kavi	1204
Parsva Pandita	1205
Maghanandycharya	1209
Janna	1209–1230
Puligere Somanatha	13th c.
Hastimalla	13th c.
Chandrama	13th c.
Somaraja	1222
Gunavarma II	1235
Polalvadandanatha	1224
Andayya	1217–1235
Sisumayana	1232
Mallikarjuna	1245
Naraharitirtha	1281
Kumara Padmarasa	13th c.
Mahabala Kavi	1254
Kesiraja	1260
Kumudendu	1275
Nachiraja	1300
Ratta Kavi	1300
Nagaraja	1331
Noted Kannada poets and writers in the Seuna Yadava Kingdom
Kamalabhava	1180
Achanna	1198
Amugideva	1220
Chaundarasa	1300

== Shabdamanidarpana ==
Shabdamanidarpana (Kannada: ಶಬ್ದಮಣಿದರ್ಪಣ), ("Jewel-mirror of Grammar") was authored by Kēśirāja in 1260 CE. This work remains a comprehensive, authoritative work on Kannada grammar. The rules mentioned therein were penned in kanda metre and followed a vrutti style (illustrative commentary by the author himself). Though Kēśirāja followed the model of Sanskrit grammar of the Katantra school, and that of earlier writings on Kannada grammar, his work has an originality of its own.

The text of Shabdamanidarpana begins with poetry ehalting earlier generations of writer who are cited by Kēśirāja as authoritative examples:

The expert way (sumārgam) of Gajaga, Gunanandi, Manasija, Asaga, Candrabhatta, Gunavarma, Srivijaya, Honna (Ponna), Hampa (Pampa), Sujanōttamsa – these provide the illustrative instances (lakshya) in this work. In Shabdamanidarpana, about twenty poets and thirty different works are cited, and almost every rule is explained with quotations. This work points out the Kannada language development through the preceding three centuries.

— Kesiraja (translated)

An attempt at vocabulary building is provided in several parts of the work. There is a list of verbal roots and words containing ḷ and ḹ sounds. There is also a chapter called "PrayŌgasāra" where Kesiraja has quoted a number of rare words along with their meanings.

== Passion for grammar ==
Kēśirāja had a passion for grammar, which is evident from his writings through his work Shabdamanidarpana.

Through grammar (correct) words originate; through the words of that grammar, meaning (originates); through meaning the beholding of truth; through the beholding of truth, the desired final beatitude; this (final beatitude) is the fruit for the learned.

— sūtra 10 of the Preface, Shabdamanidarpana – Kesiraja

== Literary works ==
Apart from his extant grammar Shabdamanidarpana, Kesiraja authored several other writings in Kannada, though they are deemed lost:

- Prabodhachandra (ಪ್ರಬೋಧಚಂದ್ರ)
- Chorapalaka Charitam (ಚೋರಪಾಲಕ ಚರಿತ)
- Kiratam (or Kiratarjuniyam) (ಕಿರಾತ)
- Shubhadraharana (ಸುಭದ್ರಾ ಹರಣ)
- Sri Chitramale (ಶ್ರೀ ಚಿತ್ರಮಾಲೆ)
