= Janna =

13th century Kannada poet

- Born: Janna (13th Century), Hoysala Empire, Halebidu, Karnataka, India
- Occupation: Kannada Poet
- Notable work: Yashodhara charite, Anantanatha Purana, Anubhava Mukura
- Title: Kavichakravarti
- Parents: Shankara (father); Gangadevi (mother)

Janna (c. 13th century CE) was a prominent Kannada poet in medieval Karnataka, India. He is widely regarded as one of the important Jain poets of the Hoysala period, known for his moral seriousness, philosophical depth, and refined literary style. He flourished under the patronage of the Hoysala king Narasimha I and possibly Veera Ballala II. Janna is best known for his classic Jain purana "Yashodhara Charite", as well as "Anantanatha Purana" and "Anubhava Mukhura".

== Early life and background ==
Little is known with certainty about Janna’s early life. He was a Jain by faith and is believed to have belonged to a scholarly Jain family in Karnataka. He served as a court poet and minister (Dandanayaka) under the Hoysalas, which enabled him to compose his major works in a refined courtly style.

== Works ==
Janna’s most famous work is "Yashodhara Charite", a Jain purana in Kannada that narrates the story of King Yashodhara, exploring themes of desire, sin, karmic consequence, and spiritual redemption with vivid and sometimes shocking imagery. He is also credited with "Ananthanatha Purana", which narrates the life of Anantanatha, the 14th Tirthankara of Jainism, and Anubhava Mukhura, which further showcases his poetic skill and moral depth.

== Legacy ==
Janna is remembered as one of the great Jain poets in Kannada literature, alongside adikavi Pampa, Ranna (Kannada poet), and Ponna (poet). His works reflect the strong Jain influence on medieval Karnataka’s literary culture, combining ornate poetic expression with serious moral and philosophical concerns.

== Magnum opus ==
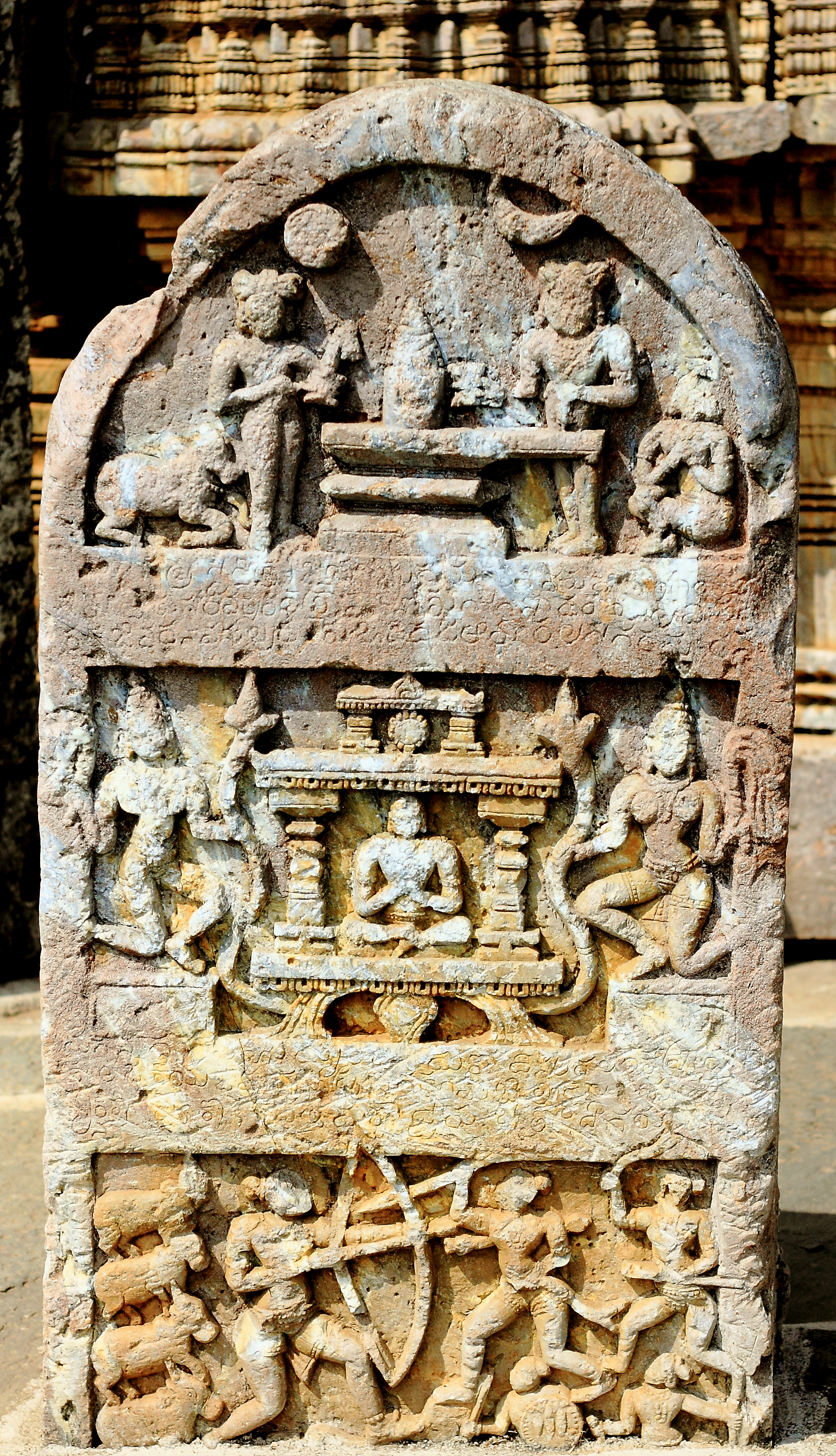
Close up of Poetic Kannada inscription composed by Janna on a Hero stone at the Amrutesvara Temple, Amruthapura, Chikkamagaluru district, Karnataka state, India

Noted Kannada poets and writers in Hoysala Empire (1100-1343 CE)
Nagachandra	1105
Kanti	1108
Rajaditya	12th. c
Harihara	1160–1200
Udayaditya	1150
Vritta Vilasa	1160
Kereya Padmarasa	1165
Nemichandra	1170
Sumanobana	1175
Rudrabhatta	1180
Aggala	1189
Palkuriki Somanatha	1195
Sujanottamsa(Boppana)	1180
Kavi Kama	12th c.
Devakavi	1200
Raghavanka	1200–1225
Bhanduvarma	1200
Balachandra Kavi	1204
Parsva Pandita	1205
Maghanandycharya	1209
Janna	1209–1230
Puligere Somanatha	13th c.
Hastimalla	13th c.
Chandrama	13th c.
Somaraja	1222
Gunavarma II	1235
Polalvadandanatha	1224
Andayya	1217–1235
Sisumayana	1232
Mallikarjuna	1245
Naraharitirtha	1281
Kumara Padmarasa	13th c.
Mahabala Kavi	1254
Kesiraja	1260
Kumudendu	1275
Nachiraja	1300
Ratta Kavi	1300
Nagaraja	1331
Noted Kannada poets and writers in the Seuna Yadava Kingdom
Kamalabhava	1180
Achanna	1198
Amugideva	1220
Chaundarasa	1300

Yashodhara Charite is a classic Kannada Jain poem by Janna, written during the 13th century when Jainism was facing challenges in Karnataka. It is an epic in the kandapadya metre, consisting of around 310 verses with a unique set of stories that use extreme, often gruesome imagery of lust, violence, and sin as cautionary moral lessons on the consequences of unchecked desire.

The poem narrates the downfall and repentance of King Yashodhara, who under the sway of lust commits horrific sins including incest and cannibalism, but ultimately repents, illustrating the Jain doctrines of karma and spiritual liberation (moksha). Inspired in part by Sanskrit versions of the tale, Janna’s work emphasizes the moral seriousness and psychological complexity of the theme.

In one of the stories, the king intends to perform a ritual sacrifice of two young boys to a local deity but, taking pity, releases them and abandons human sacrifice. In another, he burns himself on the funeral pyre of a friend’s wife whom he abducted in desire and who dies of grief. In yet another, the poem describes the queen Armutamati’s attraction to the ugly Mahout Ashtavakra. To expiate her sin, Yashodhara performs a symbolic cock sacrifice that becomes gruesome when the cock comes alive and crows at the time of death. He and his mother are reborn as animals, suffering for many rebirths before attaining redemption.

== Other writings ==
Janna's Anubhava Mukhura is a treatise on erotics and the science of sex, a topic that was well established as a genre of Kannada literature by his time.
