= Shatpadi =

Shatpadi (ಷಟ್ಪದಿ Shatpadi) is a native meter in Kannada prosody that has been used extensively in Kannada poetry. It meter can usually have six padas of syllables, divided into groups of various fixed number of matra (beats) in each line. It was most efficiently employed by the great medieval Kannada poets such as Raghavanka, Kumaravyasa and Lakshmeesha.

1. Shara Shatpadi: None
2. Kusuma Shatpadi: None
3. Bhoga Shatpadi: Tirukana Kanasu by Shadaksharadeva (Muppina Shadakshari)
4. Bhamini Shatpadi: Karnata Bharata Kathamanjari by Kumaravyasa (c.1425), Prabhulingleele by Chamarasa (c.1425), Torave Ramayana by Kumara Valmiki (c.1500), Nalacharite by Kanakadasa (16th century)
5. Parivardhini Shatpadi: 'ಬಡೆಕೊಳ್ಳ ಮಠದ ಶಿವಯೋಗಿ ಶ್ರೀ ನಾಗೇಂದ್ರ ಮಹಾಸ್ವಾಮಿಗಳವರ ಚರಿತ್ರೆ' - ಮಹಾ ಕಾವ್ಯ. ರಚನೆ - ಶ್ರೀಶೈಲಪ್ಪ ಕಳಸದ. ಬೆಳಗಾವಿ, ಕರ್ನಾಟಕ. ಪ್ರಕಟಣೆ - ೨೦೨೦ ( 'Badekolla Mathad Shivayogi Shri Nagendra Mahaswamigalavar Charitre' - Maha Kavya. - by ShriShailappa Kalasad, Belagavi, Karnataka. Published in 2020)
6. Vardhaka Shatpadi: Harishchandra Kavya, Siddarama Charite and Somanatha Charite by Raghavanka (12th century), Jaimini Bharata by Lakshmisha (16th century) and Bhavachintaratna by Gubbiya Mallanarya (c.1513)

== See also ==
- Trochee
- Anapaest
- Dactyl
- Systems of scansion
