= Saathi =

Saathi may refer to:

- Saathi (1968 film), an Indian Hindi-language romantic drama film
- Saathi (1991 film), an Indian Hindi-language crime drama film
- Saathi: The Companion, a 2005 Indian film
- Saathi (TV series), an Indian Bengali-language television series

== See also ==
- Saathiya (disambiguation)
- Sathi (disambiguation)
