= Sathi Leelavathi =

Sathi Leelavathi may refer to:

- Sathi Leelavathi (1936 film), an Indian Tamil-language film directed by Ellis R. Dungan
- Sathi Leelavathi (1995 film), an Indian Tamil-language film directed by Balu Mahendra
- Sathi Leelavathi (2026 film), an Indian Telugu-language film directed by Tatineni Satya

== See also ==
- Sathi (disambiguation)
- Leelavathi (disambiguation)
