= Sathi =

Sathi (Sanskrit: sāthī, "a companion") may refer to:

- Sathi (1938 film), an Indian Bengali-language film
- Sathi (1972 film), an Indian Malayalam-language film of 1972
- Sathi (2002 film), an Indian Bengali-language film

== See also ==
- Saathi (disambiguation)
- Saathiya (disambiguation)
- Sati (disambiguation)
- Sathi Leelavathi (disambiguation)
- Sathe, a town in Ethiopia
- Sathe (surname)
