= Sathe (surname) =

Sathe is an Indian surname that may refer to the following people:

- Anuja Sathe, Indian actress
- Annabhau Sathe (1920–1969), Indian social reformer, poet and writer
- Chandra Sathe (1947–2017), Indian cricket umpire
- Keshav Sathe (1928–2012), Indian tabla player
- Madhukar Sathe (born 1934), Indian cricketer
- Mukund Sathe (1937–2015), Indian cricketer
- Ram Sathe (1923–2008), Indian Foreign Secretary
- Ravindra Sathe, Indian playback singer
- Sadashiv Sathe (born 1926), Indian sculptor
- Shridhar Sathe (1950–2019), Indian-born American food scientist
- Shrihari Sathe, Indian filmmaker and producer
- Vasant Sathe (1925–2011), Indian politician
- Avadhut Sathe, Master Indian Trader and Trainer based in Mumbai

== See also ==
- Sathi (disambiguation)
