= Saathiya =

Saathiya may refer to:

- Saathiya (film), a 2002 Bollywood film
- Saath Nibhaana Saathiya, a television series currently broadcasting on STAR Plus
  - Saath Nibhaana Saathiya 2, its second season
- Saathiya – Pyar Ka Naya Ehsaas, a drama-series on the Indian satellite television network Sahara One in 2004

== See also ==
- Sathi (disambiguation)
