= Amitagati =

Jain philosopher

Amitagati was a Jain philosopher of the Digambara school who lived in Malwa during the 11th century in the time of the Paramara rulers. His last known date is 1014 CE. His Dharmaparīkṣā is the story of two demi-gods (vidyadhara), one of whom tries to convert the other to Jainism by pointing out the logical flaws of Hinduism. The text belongs to a long tradition of critical dialogue between Jain and Mīmāṃsāka thinkers.
