= Shabdamanidarpana =

13th century classic of Kannada grammar

Shabdamanidarpanam (Kannada: ಶಬ್ದಮಣಿದರ್ಪಣಂ Śabdamaṇidarpaṇam, "The Jewel Mirror of Language"), is a comprehensive treatise on Kannada grammar written by Kēśirāja in 1260 CE. It is the earliest systematized account of Kannada grammar, and has been regarded as an authority for the literary language since its composition. Kēśirāja draws significantly upon the Kātantra system of Sanskrit grammar, owing to the widespread use of Sanskrit as a language of intellectual life.

The Śabdamaṇidarpaṇa is composed in kanda padya, a meter often employed in Kannada technical literature. Kēśirāja included his own gloss (vṛtti) along with the work. Later commentaries were also composed, such as the Sūtrānvayaratnamāle by Liṅgaṇārādhya (16th century CE) and the ṭīke ("commentary") of Niṣṭhūra (or Niṭṭūru) Nañjayya (18th century CE). There also exist modern commentaries, such as T.V. Venkatachalashastry's Darpaṇavivaraṇa. These attest to the work's enduring importance in the Kannada literary tradition.

== Mention of early poets ==
The text of Sabdamanidarpanam starts with an invocation of the great Kannada poets of earlier generations who are considered as authorities by Kesiraja, as cited by him.

The expert way (sumārgam) of Gajaga, Gunanandi, Manasija, Asaga, Candrabhatta, Gunavarma, Srivijaya, Honna (Ponna), Hampa (Pampa), Sujanōttamsa – these provide the illustrative instances (lakshya) in this work. In Shabdamanidarpanam, about twenty poets and thirty works are cited, and almost every rule is explained with quotations. This work points out the Kannada language development in the preceding three centuries.

— Kesiraja (translated)

== Grammar topics ==
=== Significance of grammar ===
In the very beginning of the Shabdamanidarpanam, in the preface section, Kesiraja explains the significance of Grammar in the context of a language and its learning:

Through grammar (correct) words originate; through the words of that grammar, meaning (originates); through meaning the beholding of truth; through the beholding of truth, the desired final beatitude; this (final beatitude) is the fruit for the learned.

— sūtra 10 of the Preface, Shabdamanidarpanam – Kesiraja

=== Adjectives ===
In one of the aphorisms (sūtra) of Shabdamanidarpanam, Kesiraja gives a list of forms ending in /-tu/ and /-du/ labelling them as guNavaachi (ಗುಣವಾಚಿ), the adjectives.

=== Lexicography ===
Shabdamanidarpanam is important from the view of lexicography. An attempt at lexicon-making is provided in several parts of the work. The work has the list of verbal roots and words containing ḷ and ḹ sounds. There is also a chapter called 'prayŌgasāra' where Kesiraja has quoted a number of rare words along with their meanings.

=== Sound forms ===
Articulate sounds

By the wish of the individual soul, by means of suitable (vital) air, at the root of the navel, like a trumpet, the substance of sound (sabda- dravya) originates which is white (sveta, dhavala); its result is (articulate, aksharatmaka) sound (sabda); and: 'The body is the musical instrument, the tongue is the plectrum, the individual soul is the performer; on account of the operation of his mind (articulate) sound (sabda) originates which is of a white colour (dhavalavarna) and has the form of letters (aksharariipa).

— Ferdinand Kittel, translated from original Shabdamanidarpanam by Kesiraja.

Inarticulate sounds

Inarticulate (anaksharatmaka) sounds, as thunder from the clouds or the roar of the sea, have no representations in grammatical alphabets.

— Ferdinand Kittel, translated from original Shabdamanidarpana by Kesiraja.
