= Lakshmisa =

Kannada writer

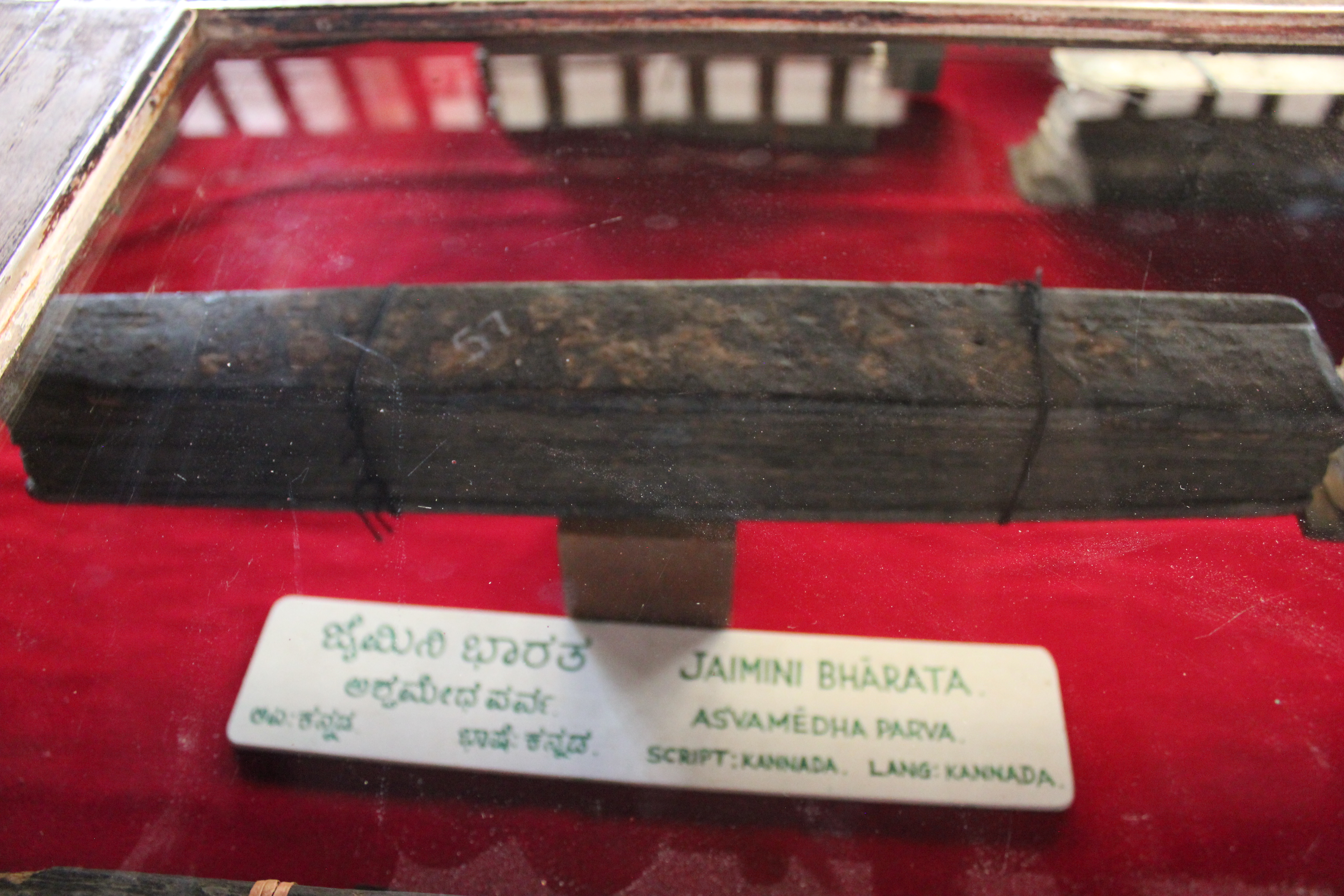
The Ashvamedha parva of Lakshmisha's Kannada epic Jaimini Bharata

Lakshmisa (or Lakshmisha) was a noted Kannada language writer who lived during the mid-16th or late 17th century. His most important writing, Jaimini Bharata is a version of the Hindu epic Mahabharata. The writing focuses on the events following the battle of Indraprastha between the Pandavas and Kauravas, using the Ashvamedha ("horse sacrifice") conducted by Yudhishthira as the topic of the epic narrative. The writing is in the shatpadi metre (hexa-metre, 6 line verse) and was inspired by the Sanskrit original written by sage Jaimini.

== Life ==
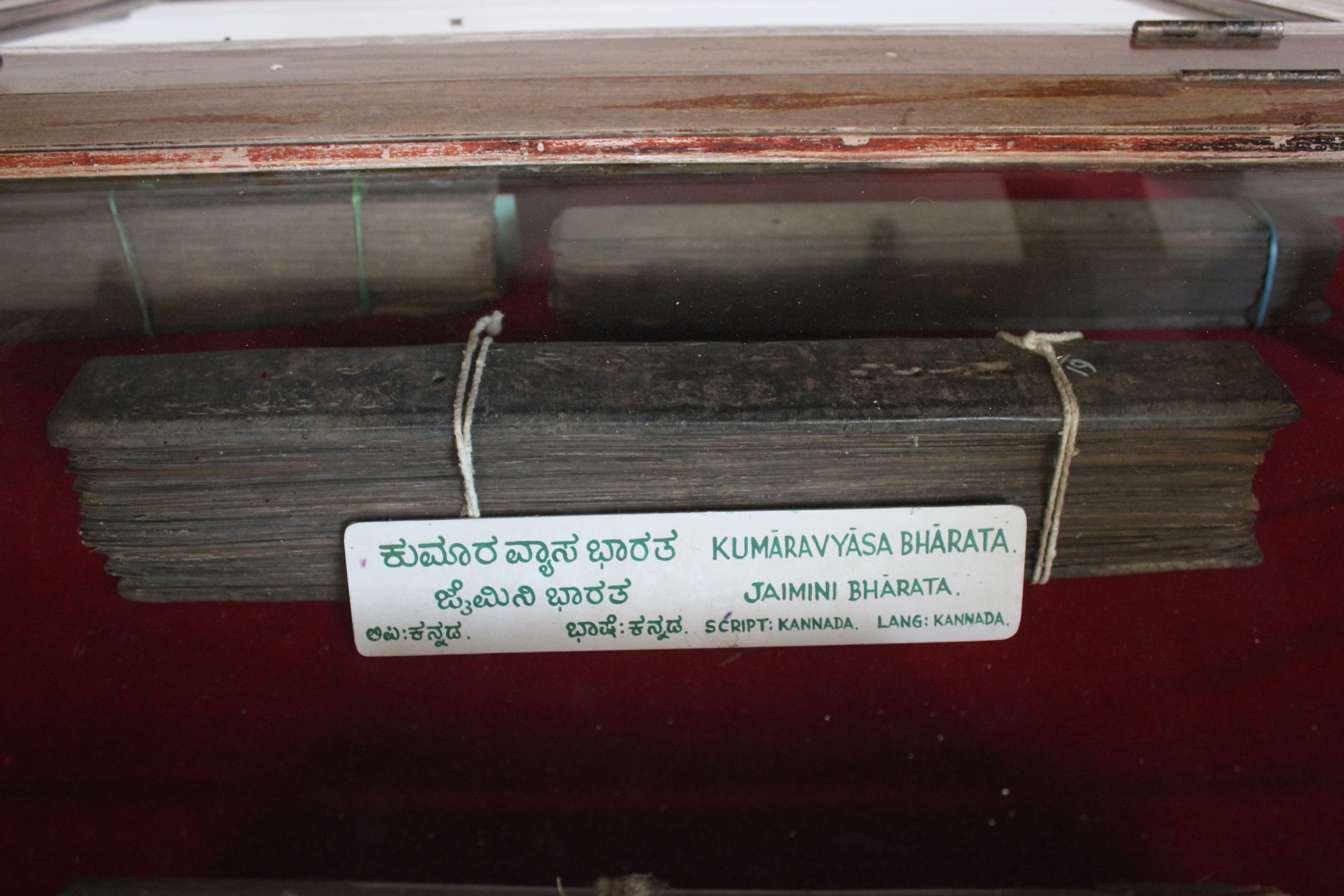
Parts of the Kannada epics: Kumaravyasa's Mahabharata and Lakshmisha's Jaimini Bharata

The place, time and religious sect that Lakshmisa belonged to has been a subject of controversy among historians. Some historians believe he was a native of Devanur in modern Kadur taluk, Chikkamagaluru district, Karnataka state. It is claimed that his family deity was Lakshmiramana (a form of Vishnu) to whom he dedicated his writing. Devanur was called by multiple names in his writing; Surapura and Girvanapura. Other historians feel Surapura is located in the erstwhile Hyderabad region. Some historians believe that Lakshmisa was an Advaitin or a Smartha Brahmin (a believer of monistic philosophy) of the Bhagavata sect because the poet invokes the names of Shiva, his consort Parvati, and son Ganesha in the beginning of his writing. However, despite these invocations, he may have been a Srivaishnava (a follower of the Visishtadvaita philosophy preached by 12th century philosopher Ramanuja), there being examples of other Srivaishnava poets (who wrote in Kannada) who praised the deities Shiva, Parvati, and Ganesha in their writings.

There is also controversy about when he wrote Jaimini Bharata. Scholars have assigned him various dates, the earliest being c. 1415, but more generally mid–16th century, and late 17th century. The 16th century or earlier dating is based on similarities between Virupaksha Pandita's (1584 CE) Chennabasava Purana and Lakshmisa's work, while the 17th century dating is based on the claim that no author, Brahmin or otherwise, has referenced his writing and directly mentioned his name in any literature during the period 15th century through the late 17th century. Authors who do mention Lakshmisa regularly in their writings are from the 18th century.

== Magnum opus ==
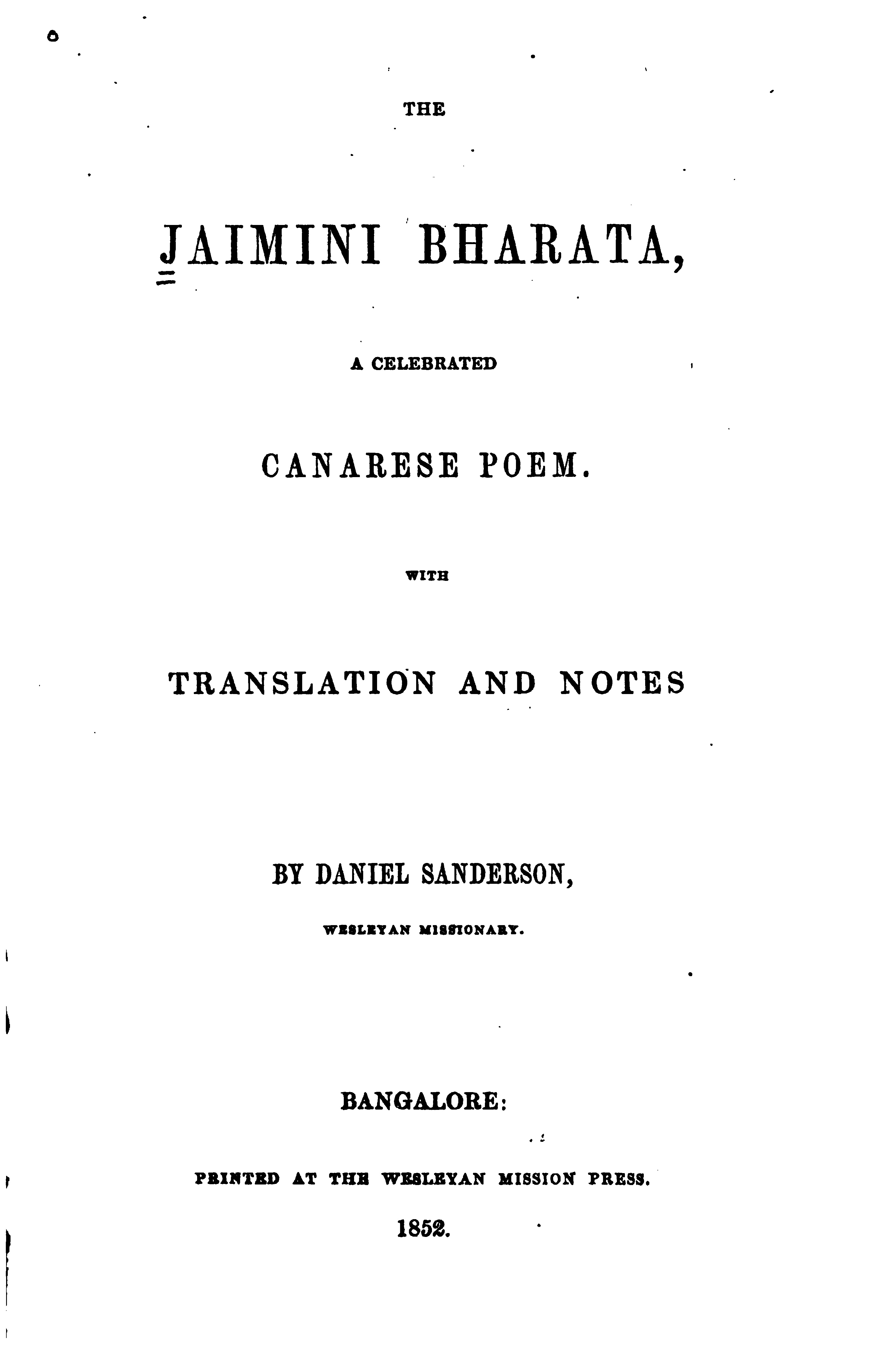
Jaimini Bharata, Wesleyan Mission Press, Bangalore, 1852

The Jaimini Bharata, one of the most well known stories in Kannada literature was written in the tradition of sage Jaimini. It has remained popular through the centuries. In a writing full of similes and metaphors, puns and alliterations, Lakshmisa created a human tale out of an epic, earning him the honorific "Upamalola" ("One who revels in similes and metaphors") and "Nadalola" ("Master of melody"). The writing focusses on the events following the battle when the victorious Pandavas conducted the Ashvamedha Yagna to expiate the sin of fratricide. The writing differs entirely from Kumara Vyasa's rendering of the same epic (called Karnata Bharata Kathamanjari) of c. 1430, both in metre and content. Kumara Vyasa had used the flexible bhamini shatpadi metre and followed the Vyasa tradition whereas Lakshmisa used the vardhaka shatpadi metre which is well suited for figures of speech. The work has been criticised though, for failing to achieve the level of devotion towards Bhagavan (God) Krishna that Kumara Vyasa managed in the various stages of his story.

However, Lakshmisa is considered a successful story-teller with an ability to narrate the Upakhyanas ("story within a story"), describe the physical beauty of a woman at length and to hold the reader with his rich Kannada diction and rhetoric. The writing has been considered an asset to the enlightened reader as well as those not so educated. Lakshmisa authored some poems reminiscent of the Haridasa poetry but without the same success.

In 1852, the Wesleyan Mission Press published the Jaimini Bharata with an English translation by Daniel Sanderson, a Wesleyan missionary at the Bangalore Wesleyan Canarese Mission.
