= Narasimha I =

Hoysala King from 1152 to 1173 CE

Hoysala King
- Reign: c. 1152 – c. 1173 CE
- Predecessor: Vishnuvardhana
- Successor: Veera Ballala II
- Issue: Veera Ballala II
- Dynasty: Hoysala

Narasimha I (Kannada: ಒಂದನೆ ನರಸಿಂಹ) (r. 1152–1173 CE) was a ruler of the Hoysala Empire. His main legacy is his victory over his overlord Western Chalukya Empire King Tailapa III, which paved the way for the declaration of independence by his successor. He however failed to meet the challenge of their Kalachuri feudatory Bijjala II. Narasimha I was overthrown by his son Veera Ballala II.

== Rule ==
Narasimha I's general Hulla built a charity-house at Jinanathapura (near Shravanabelagola) in 1163 CE, Bhandara Basadi in 1159 CE and Vardamana Jain temple, Sankighatta in 1141 CE.

Preceded by Vishnuvardhana	Hoysala; 1152–1173	Succeeded by Veera Ballala II
