= Harihara (poet) =

12th century Kannada poet

- Born: 13th century CE; Halebidu
- Died: 13th century CE
- Occupations: Poet, Writer
- Works: Girijā-kalyāṇa

Harihara (or Harisvara) was a noted Kannada poet and writer of the Śaiva tradition. A native of Halebidu in modern Hassan district, he came from a family of royal accountants (karaṇika). According to Gil Ben-Herut, he likely lived in the 13th century since one of his earliest works (the Girijākalyāṇa) is quoted in the first Kannada literary anthology, the Sūktisudhārṇava (dated to 1245 CE); but there is little evidence that locates him in the court of a specific ruler. Later, he moved to Hampi and authored one of his enduring works: a collection of ragaḷes on the lives of Śaiva devotees. Among his other writings, the Girijākalyāṇa written in campū metre (mixed prose-verse) is considered one of the enduring classics of Kannada language.

== Famous writings ==
Harihara began his literary career as a royal accountant (karaṇika) and poet. The Girijākalyāṇa ("The Marriage of Girijā") is one of his surviving compositions out of his many works. It utilizes the campū style favored by the earlier Jain Kannada poets and describes the events leading to the marriage of Shiva and his consort Parvati in ten chapters. Harihara brings out his ability for narration while describing the lamentation of Rati for Kama, and the intense love and devotion of Parvati for Shiva.

Though he was skilled in the styles of courtly poetry, Harihara is most widely remembered for his collection of ragaḷes, poems written in the flexible meter of the same name. This work is most often called the Śivaśaraṇara ragaḷegaḷu ("Ragaḷes on the Devotees of Śiva") or Hariharana ragaḷegaḷu ("The Ragaḷes of Harihara"), though sometimes it is called Śaraṇacaritamānasa, "the Lake of the Deeds of Devotees") or Śivagaṇada Ragaḷegaḷu ("Ragaḷes on the Attendants of Śiva"). The 108 narratives tell the life stories of Śaiva saints in a native Kannada metrical style known as the ragaḷe. These poems show a deep familiarity with not only Āgamic Śaiva practices but also the vernacular Śaiva traditions that appear in the vacana sāhitya. The ragaḷes are notable for their flexible use of courtly and vernacular poetic style, and their inclusion of a wide variety of Śaiva personalities. From the Tamil nāyaṉārs to the Kannada śaraṇas, and even a handful of legendary northern devotees like Ōhila and Udbhaṭa, the ragaḷes demonstrate Harihara's acquaintance with a vast religious and literary tradition.

Harihara is regarded as the inaugurator of the Śaiva hagiographic tradition in Kannada, and effectively the Kannada counterpart to Cēkkiḻār (writing in Tamil) and Pālkuriki Sōmanātha (writing in Telugu), who were his rough contemporaries. Harihara is credited with the popularization of the ragaḷe, a meter native to the Kannada language. In a deviation from the norm of the day, Harihara avoided glorifying famous mortals and continued the Jain tradition of "glorifying the spirit" and the "conquest of evil within oneself". He was so against praising earthly mortals, that a popular story relates that he slapped his protégé and nephew, Rāghavāṅka for writing about King Harishchandra in the work Harīścandrakāvya (c. 1200).

=== Selected works ===
Basavarājadēvara Ragaḷe
One of the longest works in the collection, the Basavarājadēvara Ragaḷe relates the life of Basavanna, emphasizing the saint's compassion for devotees of Śiva. This work is the earliest biography of Basavanna from which 13 out of 25 sections are available. Harihara's version of the story is notable for including details that are not found in later tellings. While some works depict Basavanna as having left his home over a difference of opinion with his father regarding the Brahminical initiation ritual (the "sacred thread ceremony"), Harihara's account states Basavanna lost his parents early in life and was cared for by his grandmother. Later he discarded his thread and left for Sangama, indicating he was already initiated. Regarding Basavanna's employment under King Bijjala II, while popular theory holds that Basavanna succeeded his deceased maternal uncle (whose daughter he was married to) as the treasurer of the king, according to Harihara, Basavanna's introduction to the king was made by the incumbent treasurer Sidhdandadhisa, whom he later succeeded to the post.

Muḍige Aṣṭaka

Mudigeya ashtaka (1200) is an important ashtaka poem (an eight line verse metre) by Harihara. Legend has it that once when Harihara bowed down in prayer to his god (Shiva), the rudrākṣa flowers in his headgear (a muḍige) fell on the floor. Seeing this, the devotees who had gathered there derided Harihara for wearing the headgear. In response, Harihara composed the ashtaka extempore in honor of his deity and included a challenging phrase "I have laid the mudige on the floor, let me see who can pick it up".

Other writings

Harihara's other works include Pushpa ragale, Marichanana ragale and Pampā śataka (written in the śataka metre comprising a string of 100 verses), in praise of Virupaksha of Hampi. For his poetic talent, he has earned the honorific "poet of exuberance" (utsava kavi).
