= Raghavanka =

12th-century Kannada poet

- Born: Late 12th century Hampi
- Died: Early 13th century
- Occupations: Poet, writer
- Works: Harishchandra Kavya (magnum opus)

Rāghavānka was a noted Kannada writer and a poet in the Hoysala court who lived in the 13th century CE. He is the nephew of the famous Śaiva poet Harihara through the latter's sister, Rudrāṇi. Raghavanka is credited for popularizing the use of the native shatpadi metre (hexa metre, 6 line verse) in Kannada literature. His work, the Harīścandra Kāvya, composed in ṣaṭpadi metre, is a telling of the life of King Harishchandra. It is a well known story, and is considered one of the important classics of Kannada language. He was a nephew and protégé of the noted Early 12-century Kannada poet Harihara. Although the shatpadi metre tradition existed in Kannada literature prior to Raghavanka, Raghavanka inspired the usage of the flexible metre for generations of poets, both Shaiva (devotees of God Shiva) and Vaishnava (devotees of God Vishnu) to come.

== Writings ==
- Harishchandra Kavya
- Siddharama charitra
- Somanatha charitra
- Viresvara charita
- Hariharamahatva
- Sarabha charitra

Although Harishchandra Kavya (c. 1200 or c. 1225) is Raghavanka's magnum opus, it was rejected by his guru, poet Harihara (or Harisvara). In some ways, Raghavanka's writing surpasses his guru's talent, especially in describing characters in his story. Legend has it that his guru was aghast at Raghavanka Pandita, a devotee of Hindu God Shiva, for writing about ordinary mortals (such as King Harishchandra). According to the same legend, five of Raghavanka's teeth "fell off instantly" for going against his guru's wishes. In order to expiate his sin, he authored five writings eulogising saints, one for each fallen tooth, and the teeth "returned one by one". According to another source, Raghavanka's guru physically abused him, punishing him for wasting his poetic talent in eulogising a mere mortal. These five writings are the Siddharama charitra (or Siddharama Purana), a eulogy of the dynamic and compassionate 12th century Veerashiava saint Siddharama of Sonnalige which brings out a larger-than-life image of the saint in a simple yet stylistic narrative; the Somanatha charitra, a propagandist work which describes the life of saint Somayya (or Adaiah) of Puligere, his humiliation after being lured by the charms of a Jain girl, and his achievement of successfully converting a Jain temple into a Shiva temple; the Viresvara charita, a dramatic story of the blind wrath of a Shaiva warrior Virabhadra; the Hariharamahatva, a eulogy of Harisvara of Hampi, and Sarabha charitra, the last two works now considered lost.

=== Harishchandra Kavya ===
In the Harishchandra Kavya, Raghavanka brings out the clash of personalities with lively dialogues; between sage Vishvamitra and sage Vashishta, between Harishchandra and Vishvamitra and between Harishchandra and the "unreal" girls ("dancing girls"). Also narrated is Harishchandra's fidelity to truth against all odds and the redemption of Harishchandra after being rescued by an untouchable he had once rejected. According to professor L. S. Sheshagiri Rao of the Sahitya Akademi, in no other language has the story of King Harishchandra been dealt with this interpretation. The writing is original both in tradition and inspiration fully utilizing the potential of the shatpadi metre. One piece of elegiac verse, written in the mandanila ragele metre (rhymed couplets) is the mourning of Chandramati over the death of her young son Lohitashva from snake bite, while gathering firewood for his Brahmin taskmaster. The poem has remained popular for centuries and is recited by Gamakis (narration of story accompanied by music).
