= Kannada literature =

Written forms of the Kannada language

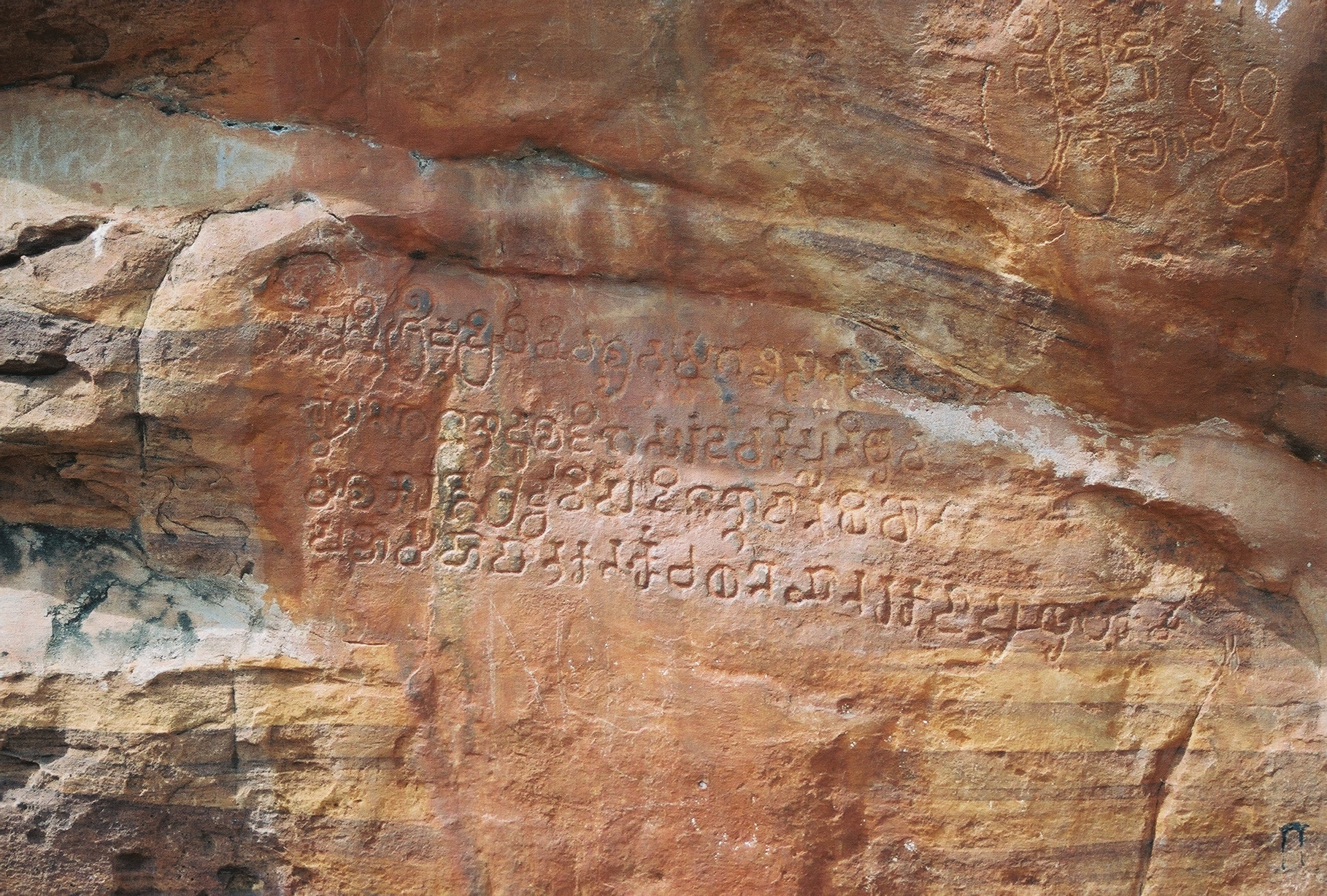
Old-Kannada inscription dated 578 CE (Badami Chalukya dynasty) outside Badami cave temple no.3

Kannada literature is the corpus of written forms of the Kannada language, which is spoken mainly in the Indian state of Karnataka and written in the Kannada script.

Attestations in literature span one and a half millennia, with some specific literary works surviving in rich manuscript traditions, extending from the 9th century to the present. The Kannada language is usually divided into three linguistic phases: Old (450–1200 CE), Middle (1200–1700 CE) and Modern (1700–present); and its literary characteristics are categorised as Jain, Lingayatism and Vaishnava—recognising the prominence of these three faiths in giving form to, and fostering, classical expression of the language, until the advent of the modern era. Although much of the literature prior to the 18th century was religious, some secular works were also committed to writing.

Starting with the Kavirajamarga (c. 850), and until the middle of the 12th century, literature in Kannada was almost exclusively composed by the Jains, who found eager patrons in the Chalukya, Ganga, Rashtrakuta, Hoysala and the Yadava kings. Although the Kavirajamarga, authored during the reign of King Amoghavarsha, is the oldest extant literary work in the language, it has been generally accepted by modern scholars that prose, verse and grammatical traditions must have existed earlier.

The Lingayatism movement of the 12th century created new literature which flourished alongside the Jain works. With the waning of Jain influence during the 14th-century Vijayanagara Empire, a new Vaishnava literature grew rapidly in the 15th century; the devotional movement of the itinerant Haridasa saints marked the high point of this era.

After the decline of the Vijayanagara Empire in the 16th century, Kannada literature was supported by the various rulers, including the Wodeyars of the Kingdom of Mysore and the Nayakas of Keladi. In the 19th century, some literary forms, such as the prose narrative, the novel, and the short story, were borrowed from English literature. Modern Kannada literature is now widely known and recognised: during the last half century, Kannada language authors have received 8 Jnanpith awards, 68 Sahitya Akademi awards and 9 Sahitya Akademi Fellowships in India. In 2025, Banu Mushtaq won the coveted International Booker Prize for her book Heart Lamp, a collection of short stories in Kannada.

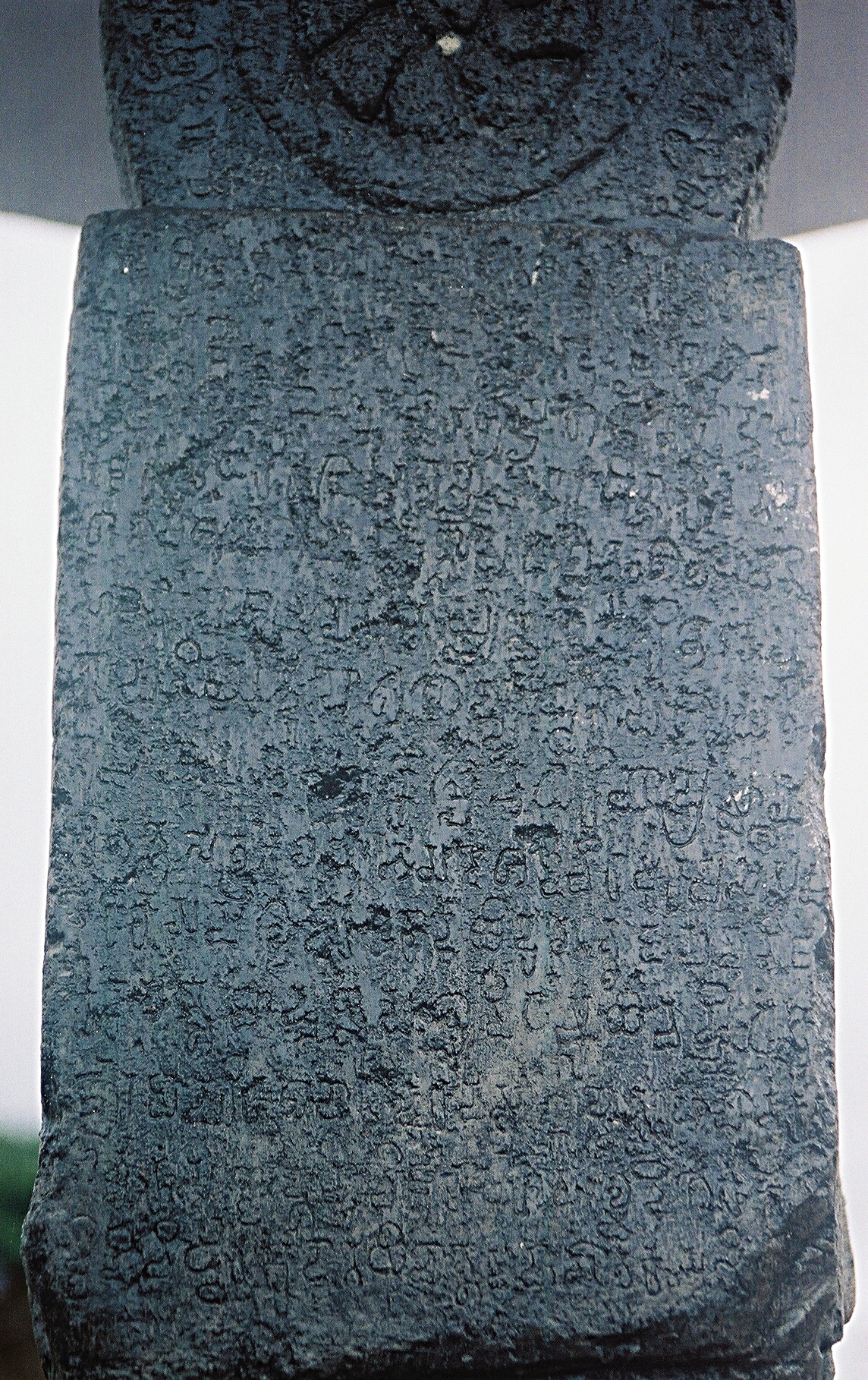
The Halmidi inscription, usually dated to the fifth century, is the earliest example of written Kannada.

== Content and genre ==
Native Kannada prosody from 7th century CE
Literature	Period
Tripadi	7th century
Chattana	pre 9th century
Bedandegabbam	pre 9th century
Melvadu	pre 9th century
Bajanegabbam	pre 9th century
Gadyakatha	pre 9th century
Akkara	pre 9th century
Ragale	10th century
Vachana	11th century
Shara Shatpadi	11th century
Kusuma Shatpadi	11th century
Bhoga Shatpadi	11th century
Bhamini Shatpadi	11th century
Parivardhini Shatpadi	11th century
Vardhaka Shatpadi	11th century
Bedagu	1160
Hadugabba	1160
Sangatya	1232
Suladi	16th century
Ugabhoga	16th century
Mundige	16th century

In the early period and beginning of the medieval period, between the 9th and 13th centuries, writers were predominantly Jains and Lingayats. Jains were the earliest known cultivators of Kannada literature, which they dominated until the 12th century, although a few works by Lingayats from that period have survived. Jain authors wrote about Tirthankaras and other aspects of religion. The Veerashaiva authors wrote about Shiva, his 25 forms, and the expositions of Shaivism. Lingayat poets belonging to the vachana sahitya tradition advanced the philosophy of Basava from the 12th century.

During the period between the 13th and 15th centuries, there was decline in Jain writings and an increase in the number of works from the Lingayat tradition; there were also contributions from Vaishnava writers. Thereafter, Lingayat and Vaishnava writers dominated Kannada literature. Vaishnava writers focused on the Hindu epics – the Ramayana, the Mahabharata and the Bhagavata – as well as Vedanta and other subjects from the Puranic traditions. The devotional songs of the Haridasa poets, performed to music, were first noted in the 15th century. Writings on secular subjects remained popular throughout this period.

An important change during the Bhakti "devotion" period starting in the 12th century was the decline of court literature and the rise in popularity of shorter genres such as the vachana and kirthane, forms that were more accessible to the common man. Writings eulogising kings, commanders and spiritual heroes waned, with a proportional increase in the use of local genres. Kannada literature moved closer to the spoken and sung folk traditions, with musicality being its hallmark, although some poets continued to use the ancient champu form of writing as late as the 17th century.

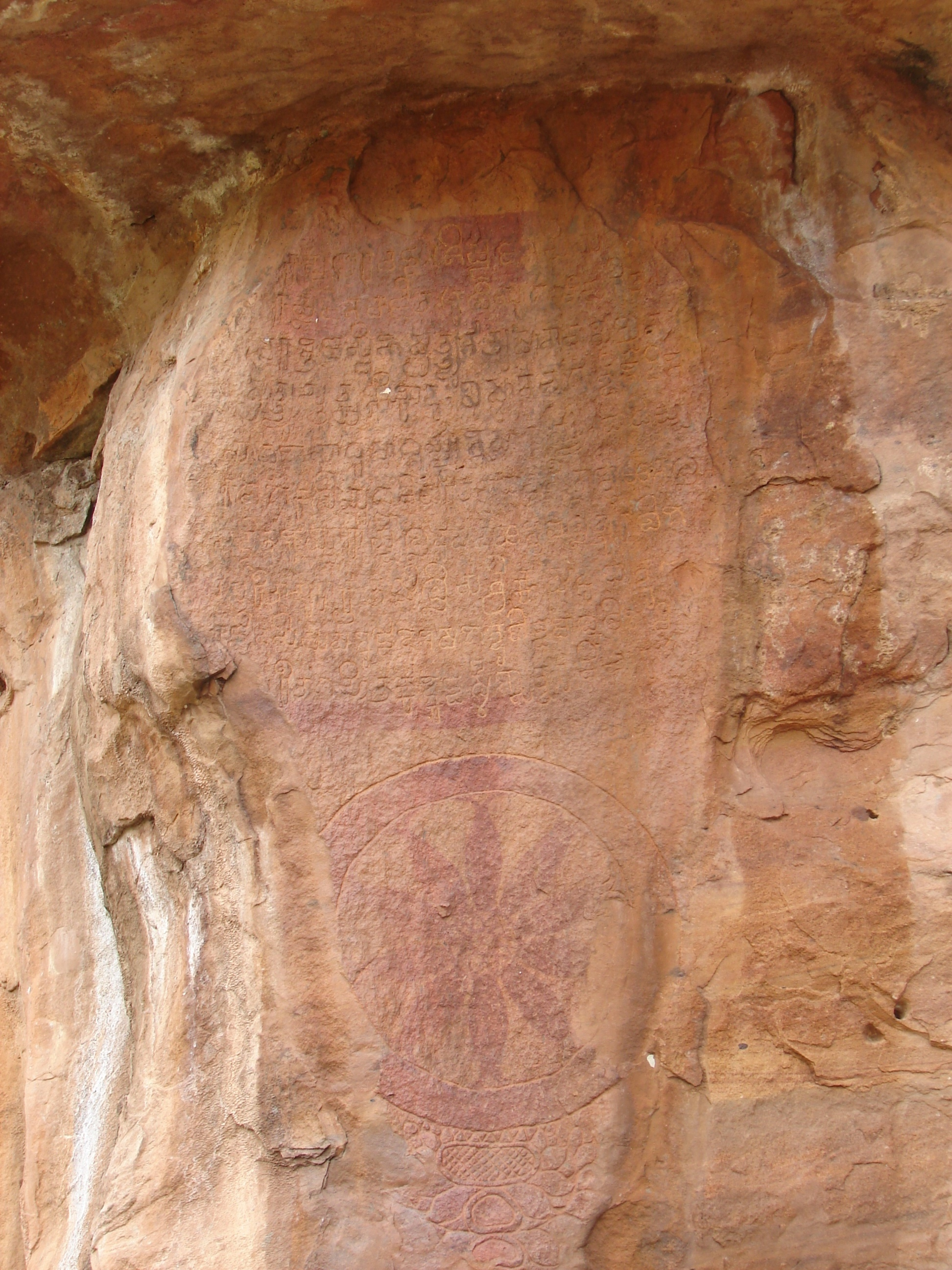
Kannada poetry on stone–7th century Kappe Arabhatta inscription

The champu Sanskritic metre (poems in verses of various metres interspersed with paragraphs of prose, also known as champu-kavya) was the most popular written form from the 9th century onwards, although it started to fall into disuse in the 12th century. Other Sanskritic metres used were the saptapadi (seven line verse), the ashtaka (eight line verse) and the shataka (hundred-line verse). There were numerous translations and adaptations of Sanskrit writings into Kannada and, to a lesser extent, from Kannada into Sanskrit. The medieval period saw the development of literary metres indigenous to the Kannada language. These included the tripadi (three-line verse, in use from the 7th century), one of the oldest native metres; the shatpadi (six-line verse, first mentioned by Nagavarma I in Chhandombudhi of c. 984 and in use from 1165), of which six types exist; the ragale (lyrical narrative compositions, in use from 1160); the sangatya (compositions meant to be sung with a musical instrument, in use from 1232) and the akkara which came to be adopted in some Telugu writings. There were rare interactions with Tamil literature, as well.

Though religious literature was prominent, literary genres including romance, fiction, erotica, satire, folk songs, fables and parables, musical treatises and musical compositions were popular. The topics of Kannada literature included grammar, philosophy, prosody, rhetoric, chronicles, biography, history, drama and cuisine, as well as dictionaries and encyclopedias. According to critic Joseph T. Shipley, over fifty works on scientific subjects including medicine, mathematics and astrology have been written in the Kannada language.

Kannada literature of this period was mainly written on palm leaves. However, more than 30,000 more durable inscriptions on stone (known as shilashasana) and copper plates (known as tamrashasana) have survived to inform modern students of the historical development of Kannada literature. The Shravanabelagola inscription of Nandisena (7th century), Kappe Arabhatta inscription (c. 700), and the Hummacha and Soraba inscriptions (c. 800) are good examples of poetry in tripadi metre, and the Jura (Jabalpur) inscription of King Krishna III (964) is regarded as an epigraphical landmark of classical Kannada composition, containing poetic diction in kanda metre, a form consisting of a group of stanzas or chapters.

Elegiac poetry on hundreds of veeragallu and maastigallu (hero stones) written by unknown poets in the kanda and the vritta (commentary) metre mourn the death of heroes who sacrificed their lives and the bravery of women who performed sati. According to the scholar T. V. Venkatachala Sastry, the book Karnataka Kavicharitre compiled by Kannada scholar R. Narasimhachar lists over one thousand anonymous pieces of Kannada literature that cover an array of topics under religious and secular categories. Some fifty Vachana poets are known only by the pen names (ankita) used in their poems. Most Jain writings included in the list are from the period 1200–1450 CE, while Lingayat and Vaishnava writings are from later periods. Secular topics include mathematics, medicine, science of horses and elephants, architecture, geography and hydrology.

The pace of change towards more modern literary styles gained momentum in the early 19th century. Kannada writers were initially influenced by the modern literature of other languages, especially English. Modern English education and liberal democratic values inspired social changes, intertwined with the desire to retain the best of traditional ways. New genres including short stories, novels, literary criticism, and essays, were embraced as Kannada prose moved toward modernisation.

== Classical period ==
=== Rashtrakuta court ===
A stanza from Kavirajamarga (c. 850) in Kannada praising the people for their literary skills

The reign of the imperial Rashtrakutas and their powerful feudatory, the Gangas, marks the beginning of the classical period of writings in the Kannada language under royal patronage, and the end of the age of Sanskrit epics.

There was an emphasis on the adoption of Sanskritic models while retaining elements of deshi literary traditions, a style that prevailed in Kannada literature throughout the classical period. Kavirajamarga, written during this period, is a treatise on the Kannada speaking people, their poetry and their language. A portion of the writing qualifies as a practical grammar. It describes defective and corrective examples (the "do's and don't's") of versification and native composition styles recognised by earlier poets (puratana kavis). These composition meters are the bedande, the chattana and the gadyakatha – compositions written in various interspersed metres. In some contexts, the term puravcharyar, which may refer to previous grammarians or rhetoricians, have also been mentioned. Some historians attribute Kavirajamarga to the Rashtrakuta king Amoghavarsha I, but others believe that the book may have been inspired by the king and co-authored or authored in full by Srivijaya, a Kannada language theorist and court poet.

The earliest existing prose piece in old Kannada is Vaddaradhane ("Worship of Elders", 9th century) by Shivakotiacharya. It contains 19 lengthy stories, some in the form of fables and parables, such as "The Sage and the Monkey". Inspired by the earlier Sanskrit writing Brihatkatha Kosha, it is about Jain tenets and describes issues of rebirth, karma, the plight of humans on earth, and social issues of the time such as education, trade and commerce, magic, superstition, and the condition of women in society.

The works of Jain writers Adikavi Pampa, Sri Ponna and Ranna, collectively called the "three gems of Kannada literature", heralded the age of classical Kannada in the 10th century. Pampa, who wrote Adipurana in 941, is regarded as one of the greatest Kannada writers. Written in champu style, Adipurana narrates the life history of the first Jain Thirtankar, Rishabhadeva. In this spiritual saga, Rishabhadeva's soul moves through a series of births before attaining emancipation in a quest for the liberation of his soul from the cycle of life and death. Pampa's other classic, Vikramarjuna Vijaya (or Pampa Bharata, 941), is loosely based on the Hindu epic the Mahabharata.

Sri Ponna, patronised by King Krishna III, wrote Santipurana (950), a biography of the 16th Jain Tirthankar Shantinatha. He earned the title Ubhaya Kavichakravathi ("supreme poet in two languages") for his command of both Kannada and Sanskrit. Although Sri Ponna borrowed significantly from Kalidasa's earlier works, his Santipurana is considered an important Jain purana.

=== Chalukya court ===
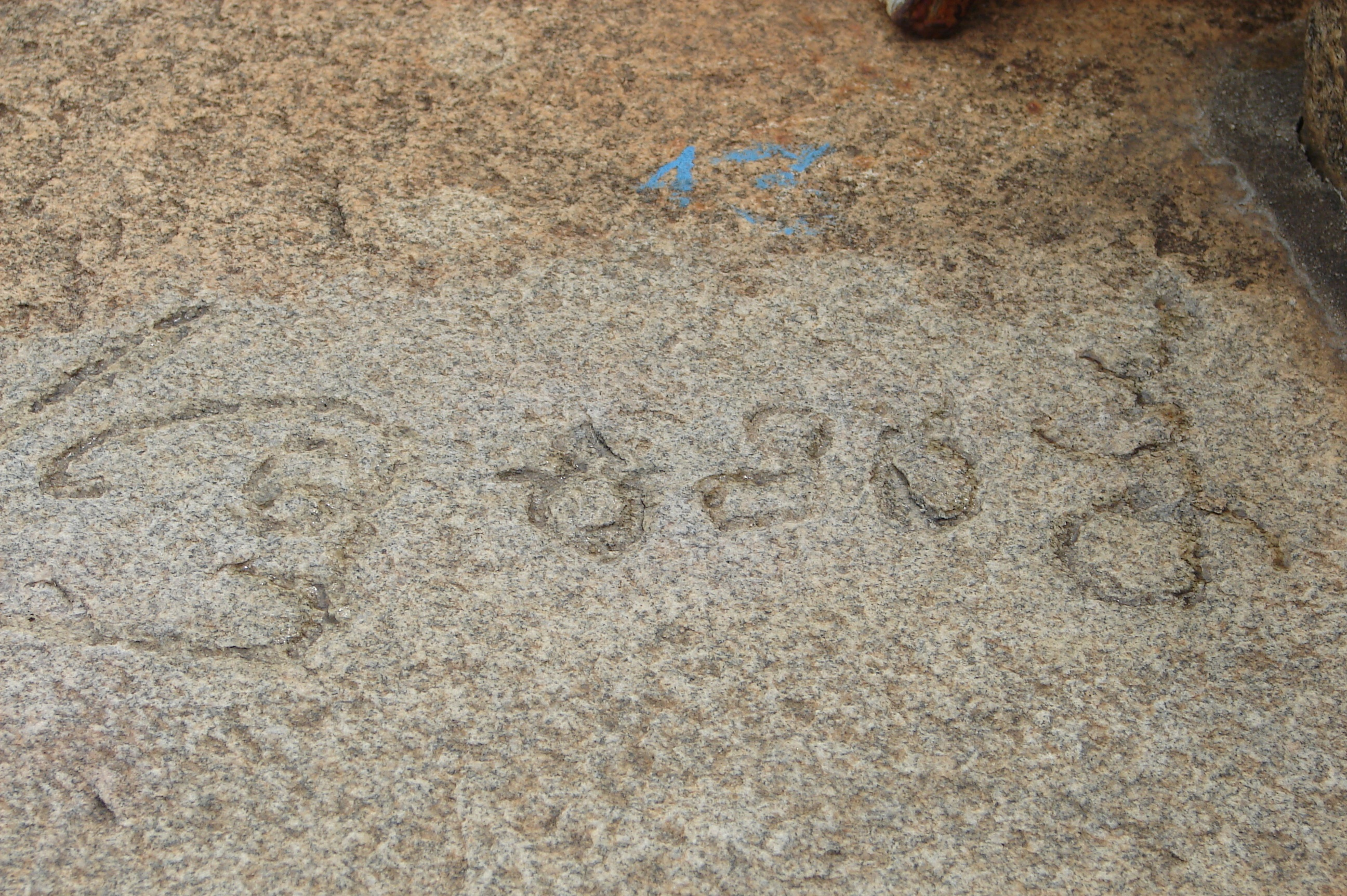
Inscribed handwriting of 10th-century poet Ranna reads Kavi Ratna (gem among poets) in Shravanabelagola

From the late 10th century, Kannada literature made considerable progress under the patronage of the new overlords of the Deccan, the Western Chalukyas and their feudatories: the Hoysalas, the southern Kalachuris of Kalyanis, the Seuna Yadavas of Devagiri and Silharas of Karad. The skill of Kannada poets was appreciated in distant lands. King Bhoja of Malwa in central India presented Nagavarma I, a writer of prosody and romance classics, with horses as a mark of his admiration.

Ranna was the court poet of the Western Chalukya kings Tailapa II and Satyashraya. He was also patronised by Attimabbe, a devout Jain woman. Ranna's poetic writings reached their zenith with Sahasa Bhima Vijaya ("Victory of the bold Bhima", also called Gada Yudda or "Battle of Clubs", 982), which describes the conflict between Bhima and Duryodhana in his version of the Mahabharata epic, one of the earliest poetic elegies in the Kannada language. Unlike Pampa, who glorified Arjuna and Karna in his writing, Ranna eulogised his patron King Satyashraya and favourably compared him to Bhima, whom he crowned at the end of the Mahabharata war. His other well-known writing is the Ajitha purana (993), which recounts the life of the second Jain Tirthankar Ajitanatha. Ranna was bestowed the title Kavi Chakravathi ("Emperor among poets") by his patron king.

Among grammarians, Nagavarma-II, Katakacharya (poet laureate) of the Chalukya king Jagadhekamalla II made significant contributions with his works in grammar, poetry, prosody, and vocabulary; these are standard authorities and their importance to the study of Kannada language is well acknowledged. Among his other writings, the Kavyavalokana on grammar and rhetoric and the Karnataka Bhashabhushana (1145) on grammar are historically significant. However, the discovery of Vardhamana Puranam (1042), which has been ascribed by some scholars to Nagavarma II, has created uncertainty about his actual lifetime since it suggests that he may have lived a century earlier and been patronised by Jayasimha II.

== Hoysala period ==
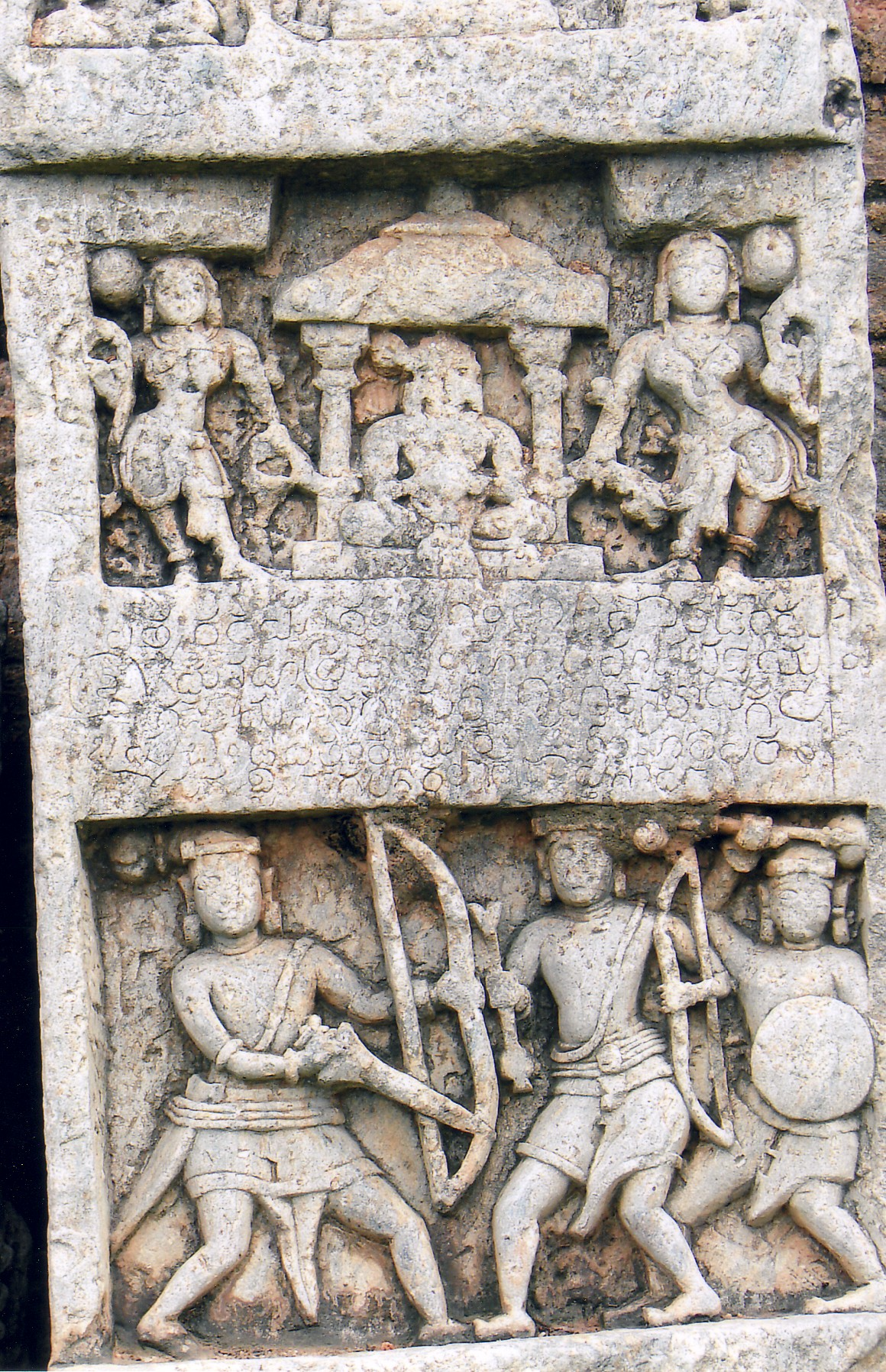
Hero stone (virgal) with old Kannada elegiac inscription (1220) at the Ishwara temple in Arasikere, Karnataka

In the late 12th century, the Hoysalas, a powerful hill tribe from the Malnad region in modern southern Karnataka, exploited the political uncertainty in the Deccan to gain dominance in the region south of the Krishna River in southern India. A new chronological era was adopted, imperial titles were claimed and Kannada literature flourished with such noted scholars as Janna, Harihara, Rudrabhatta, Raghavanka, Keshiraja and others. An important achievement during this period was the establishment of native metres in literature (the ragale, the tripadi, the sangatya and the shatpadi).

Two renowned philosophers who lived during this time, Ramanujacharya and Madhvacharya, influenced the culture of the region. The conversion of the Hoysala King Vishnuvardhana in the early 12th century from Jainism to Vaishnavism was to later prove a setback to Jain literature. In the decades to follow, Jain writers faced competition from the Veerashaivas, to which they responded with rebuttals, and from the 15th century, from the writers of the Vaishnava cadre. These events changed the literary landscape of the Kannada-speaking region forever.

One of the earliest Veerashaiva writers who was not part of the Vachana literary tradition, poet Harihara (or Harisvara) came from a family of karnikas (accountants), and worked under the patronage of King Narasimha I. He wrote Girijakalyana in ten sections following the Kalidasa tradition, employing the old Jain champu style, with the story leading to the marriage of Shiva and Parvati. In a deviation from the norm, Harihara avoided glorifying saintly mortals. He is credited with more than 100 poems in ragale metre, called the Nambiyanana ragale (or Shivaganada ragale, 1160) praising the saint Nambiyana and Virupaksha (a form of Hindu god Shiva). For his poetic talent, he has earned the honorific utsava kavi ("poet of exuberance").

Harihara's nephew, Raghavanka, was the first to introduce the shatpadi metre into Kannada literature in his epic Harishchandra Kavya (1200), considered a classic despite occasionally violating strict rules of Kannada grammar. Drawing on his skill as a dramatist, Raghavanka's story of King Harishchandra vividly describes the clash of personalities between sage Vishvamitra and sage Vashisht and between Harishchandra and Vishvamitra. It is believed that this interpretation of the story of Harishchandra is unique to Indian literature. The writing is an original and does not follow any established epic traditions. In addition to Hoysala patronage, Raghavanka was honoured by Kakatiya king Prataparudra I.

Rudrabhatta, a Smartha Brahmin (believer of monistic philosophy), was the earliest well-known Brahminical writer, under the patronage of Chandramouli, a minister of King Veera Ballala II. Based on the earlier work of Vishnu Purana, he wrote Jagannatha Vijaya (1180) in the champu style, relating the life of Lord Krishna leading up to his fight with the demon Banasura.

In 1209, the Jain scholar and army commander Janna wrote Yashodhara Charite, a unique set of stories dealing with perversion. In one of the stories, a king intended to perform a ritual sacrifice of two young boys to Mariamma, a local deity. After hearing the boys' tale, the king is moved to release them and renounce the practice of human sacrifice. In honour of this work, Janna received the title Kavichakravarthi ("Emperor among poets") from King Veera Ballala II. His other classic, Anathanatha Purana (1230), deals with the life of the 14th Tirthankar Ananthanatha.

== Vijayanagara period ==
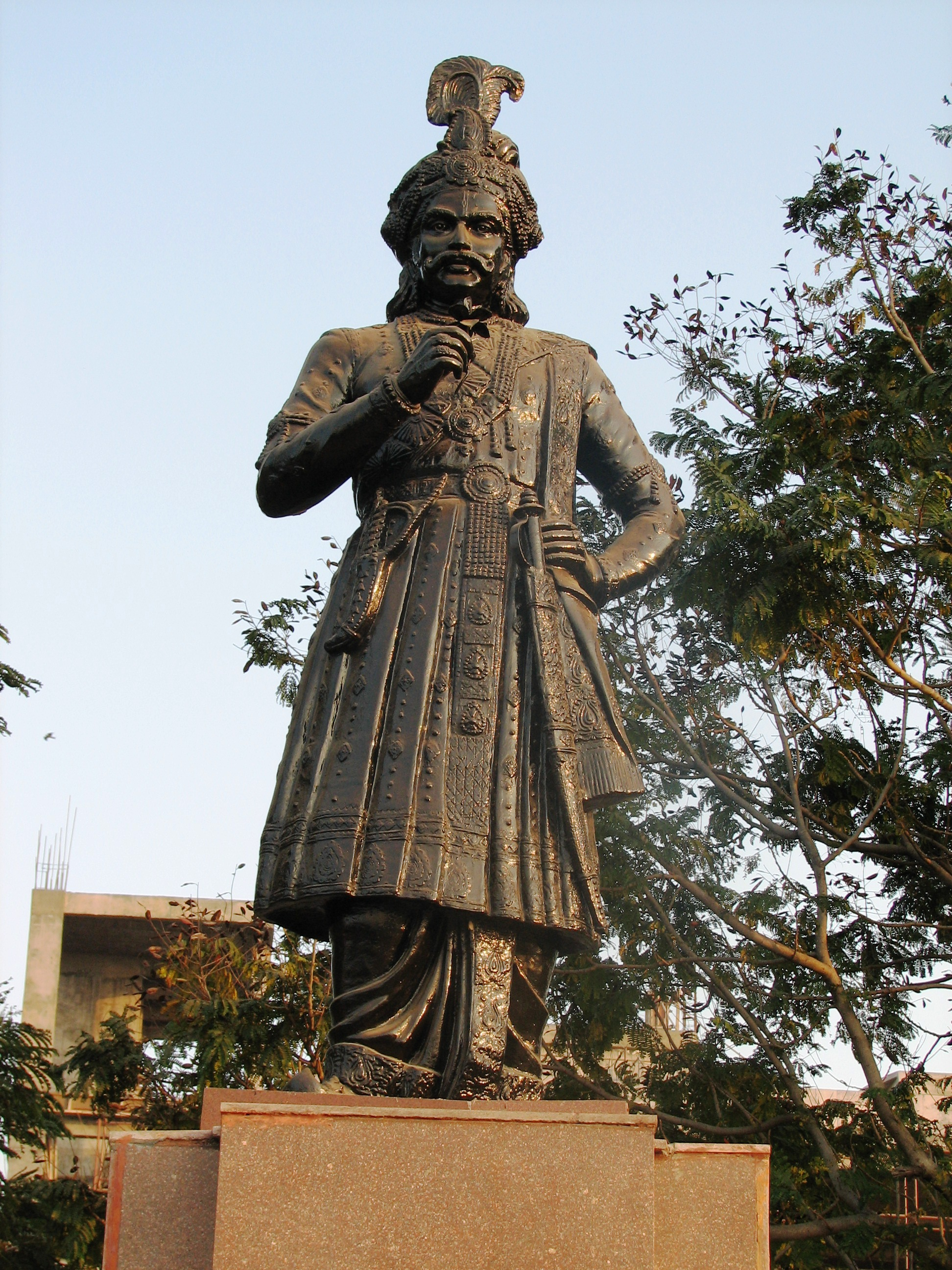
King Krishnadevaraya, patron of Kannada literature

The 14th century saw major upheavals in geo-politics of southern India with Muslim empires invading from the north. The Vijayanagara Empire stood as a bulwark against these invasions and created an atmosphere conducive to the development of the fine arts. In a golden age of Kannada literature, competition between Vaishnava and Veerashaiva writers was fierce and literary disputations between the two sects were common, especially in the court of King Deva Raya II. Acute rivalry led to "organised processions" in honour of the classics written by poets of the respective sects. The king himself was no less a writer, the romantic stories Sobagina Sone (lit "The Drizzle of Beauty") and Amaruka are assigned to him.

To this period belonged Kumara Vyasa (the pen name of Naranappa), a doyen of medieval epic poets and one of the most influential Vaishnava poets of the time. He was particularly known for his sophisticated use of metaphors and had even earned the title Rupaka Samrajya Chakravarti ("Emperor of the land of Metaphors"). In 1430, he wrote the Gadugina Bharata, popularly known as Karnata Bharata Kathamanjari or Kumaravyasa Bharata in the Vyasa tradition. The work is a translation of the first ten chapters of the epic Mahabharata and emphasises the divinity and grace of the Lord Krishna, portraying all characters with the exception of Krishna to suffer from human foibles. An interesting aspect of the work is the sense of humour exhibited by the poet and his hero, Krishna. This work marked a transition of Kannada literature to a more modern genre and heralded a new age combining poetic perfection with religious inspiration. The remaining parvas (chapters) of Mahabharata were translated by Timmanna Kavi (1510) in the court of King Krishnadevaraya. The poet named his work Krishnaraya Bharata after his patron king.

Kumara Valmiki (1500) wrote the first complete brahminical adaptation of the epic Ramayana, called Torave Ramayana. According to the author, the epic he wrote merely narrated God Shiva's conversation with his consort Parvati. This writing has remained popular for centuries and inspired folk theatre such as the Yakshagana, which has made use of its verses as a script for enacting episodes from the great epic. In Valmiki's version of the epic, King Ravana is depicted as one of the suitors at Sita's Swayamvara (lit. a ceremony of "choice of a husband"). His failure to win the bride's hand results in jealousy towards Rama, the eventual bridegroom. As the story progresses, Hanuman, for all his services to Rama, is exalted to the status of "the next creator". Towards the end of the story, during the war with Rama, Ravana realises that his adversary is none other than the God Vishnu and hastens to die at his hands to achieve salvation.

Chamarasa, a Veerashaiva poet, was a rival of Kumara Vyasa in the court of Devaraya II. His eulogy of the saint Allama Prabhu, titled Prabhulinga Lile (1430), was later translated into Telugu and Tamil at the behest of his patron king. In the story, the saint was considered an incarnation of Hindu God Ganapathi while Parvati took the form of a princess of Banavasi.

Interaction between Kannada and Telugu literatures, a trend which had begun in the Hoysala period, increased. Translations of classics from Kannada to Telugu and vice versa became popular. Well-known bilingual poets of this period were Bhima Kavi, Piduparti Somanatha and Nilakanthacharya. In fact, so well versed in Kannada were some Telugu poets, including Dhurjati, that they freely used many Kannada terms in their Telugu writings. It was because of this "familiarity" with Kannada, that the notable writer Srinatha even called his Telugu, "Kannada". This process of interaction between the two languages continued into the 19th century in the form of translations by bilingual writers.

== Mystic literature ==
=== Veerashaiva ===
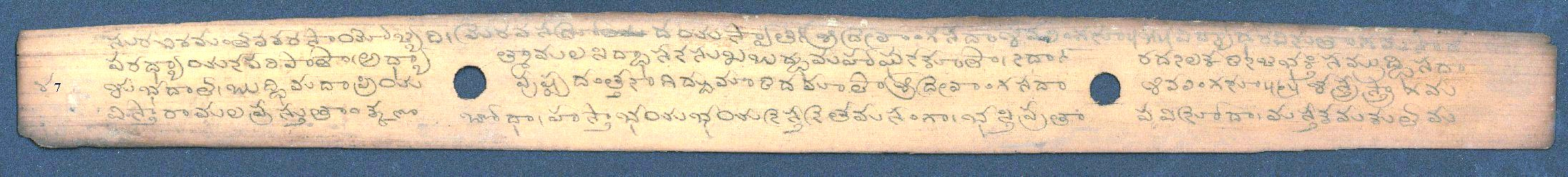
Palm leaf with 11th–12th century Vachana poems in old Kannada

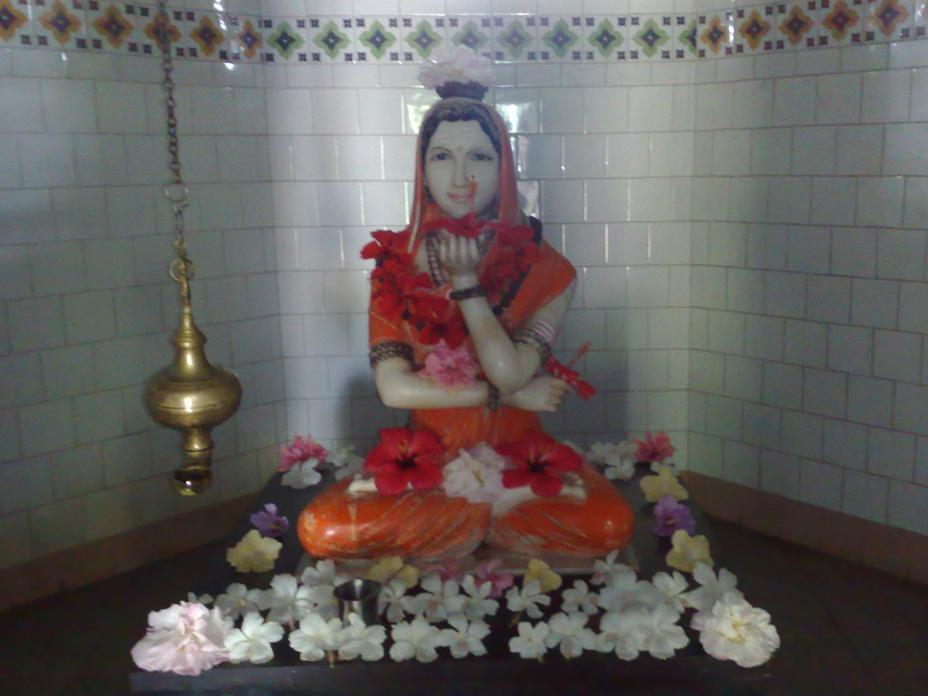
Akka Mahadevi, 12th century female poet

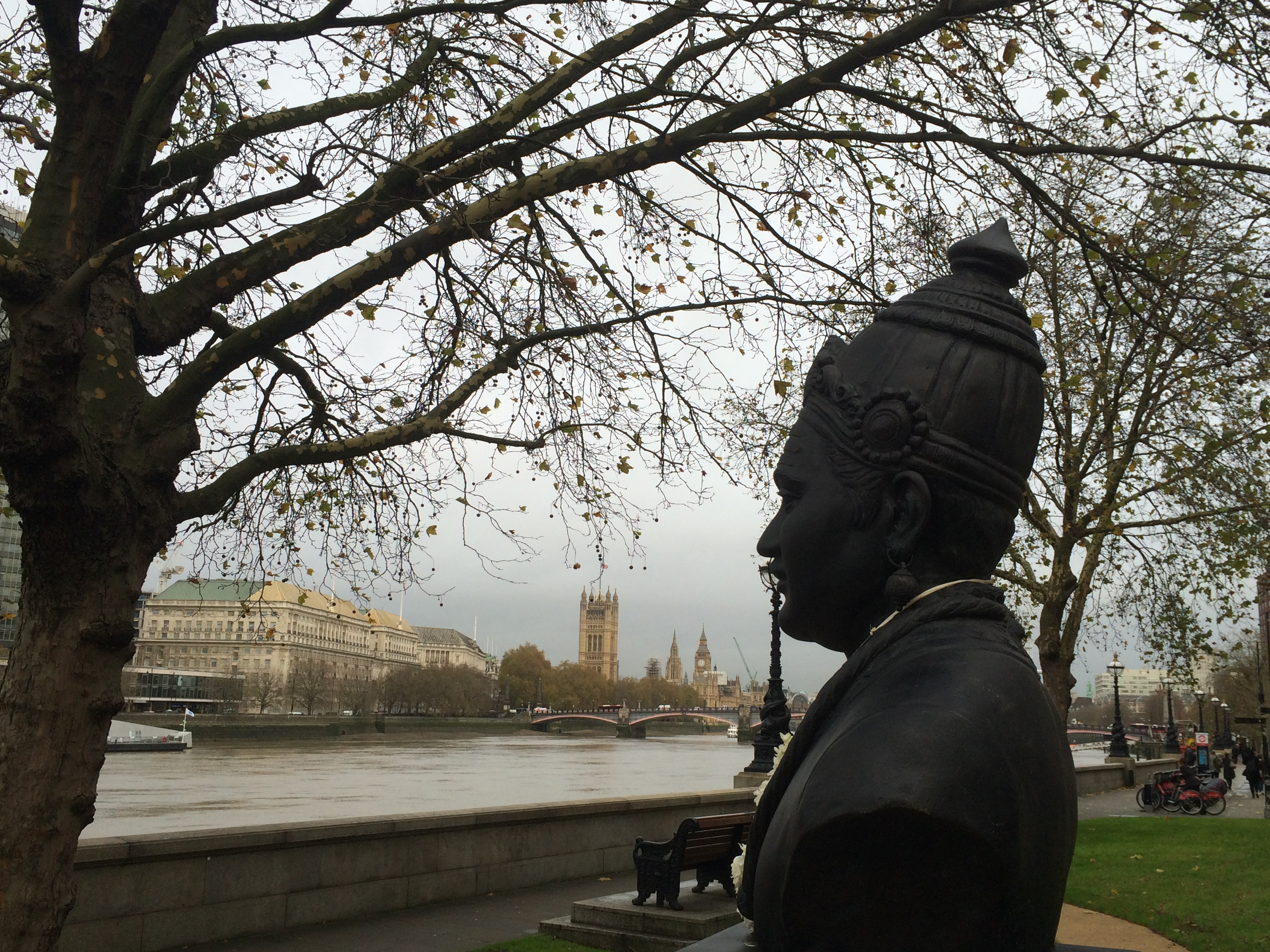
The bust of Basaveswara, unveiled in London in 2015, facing the UK Parliament

In the late 12th century, the Kalachuris successfully rebelled against their overlords, the Western Chalukyas, and annexed the capital Kalyani. During this turbulent period, a new religious faith called Veerashaivism (or Lingayatism) developed as a revolt against the existing social order of Hindu society. Some of the followers of this faith wrote literature called Vachana Sahitya ("Vachana literature") or Sharana Sahitya ("literature of the devotees") consisting of a unique and native form of poetry in free verse called Vachana. Basavanna (or Basava, 1134–1196), the prime minister of Kalachuri King Bijjala II, is generally regarded as the inspiration for this movement. Devotees gathered to discuss their mystic experiences at a centre for religious discussion called Anubhava Mantapa ("hall of experience") in Kalyani. Here, they expressed their devotion to God Shiva in simple vachana poems. These poems were spontaneous utterances of rhythmic, epigrammatical, satirical prose emphasising the worthlessness of riches, rituals and book learning, displaying a dramatic quality reminiscent of the dialogues of Plato.

Basavanna, Allama Prabhu, Devara Dasimayya, Channabasava, Siddharama (1150), and Kondaguli Kesiraja are the best known among numerous poets (called Vachanakaras) who wrote in this genre. Akka Mahadevi was prominent among the several women poets; in addition to her poetry, she is credited with two short writings, Mantrogopya and Yogangatrividhi. Siddharama is credited with writings in tripadi metre and 1,379 extant poems (though he has claimed authorship of 68,000 poems).

The Veerashaiva movement experienced a setback with the assassination of King Bijjala and eviction of the sharanas (devotees) from Kalyani; further growth of Vachana poetry was curtailed until the 15th century when another wave of writings began under the patronage of the rulers of Vijayanagara. Chieftain Nijaguna Shivayogi originated a new philosophy called Kaivalya, founded on the advaitha (monistic) philosophy of Adi Shankara, synthesised with an offshoot of the Veerashaiva faith. A prolific writer, Shivayogi composed devotional songs collectively known as the Kaivalya sahitya (or Tattva Padagalu, literally "songs of the pathway to emancipation"). His songs were reflective, philosophical and concerned with Yoga. Shivayogi also wrote a highly respected scientific encyclopaedia called the Vivekachintamani; it was translated into Marathi language in 1604 and Sanskrit language in 1652 and again in the 18th century. The encyclopaedia includes entries on 1,500 topics and covers a wide range of subjects including poetics, dance and drama, musicology and erotics.

Other well-known poet saints of the Veerashaiva tradition include Muppina Sadakshari, a contemporary of Shivayogi, whose collection of songs are called the Subodhasara, Chidananda Avadhuta of the 17th century and Sarpabhushana Shivayogi of the 18th century. So vast is this body of literature that much of it still needs to be studied.

=== Vaishnava ===
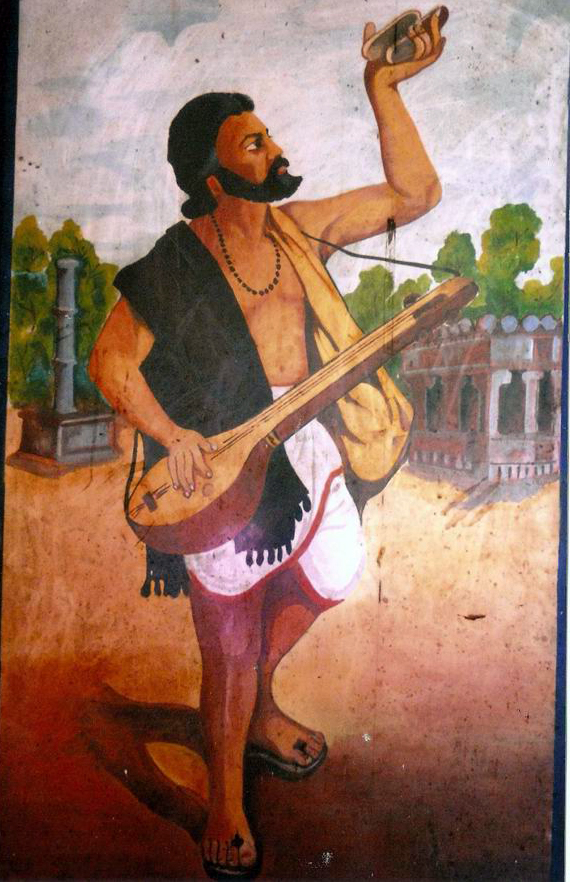
Kanaka Dasa (c. 1509–1609)

The Vaishnava Bhakti (devotional) movement involving well-known Haridasas (devotee saints) of that time made an indelible imprint on Kannada literature starting in the 15th century, inspiring a body of work called Haridasa Sahitya ("Haridasa literature"). Influenced by the Veerashaivism of the 12th century, this movement touched the lives of millions with its strong current of devotion. The Haridasas conveyed the message of Vedantic philosopher Madhvacharya to the common man through simple Kannada language in the form of devaranamas and kirthanas (devotional songs in praise of god). The philosophy of Madhvacharya was spread by eminent disciples including Naraharitirtha, Jayatirtha, Vyasatirtha, Sripadaraya, Vadirajatirtha, Purandara Dasa, and Kanaka Dasa. Chaitanya Mahaprabhu, a prominent saint from distant Bengal, visited the region in 1510, further stimulating the devotional movement.

Purandara Dasa (1484–1564), a wandering bard, is believed to have composed 475,000 songs in the Kannada and Sanskrit languages, though only about 1,000 songs are known today. Composed in various ragas, and often ending with a salutation to the Hindu deity Vittala, his compositions presented the essence of the Upanishads and the Puranas in simple yet expressive language. He also devised a system by which the common man could learn Carnatic music, and codified the musical composition forms svaravalis, alankaras ("figure of speech") and geethams. Owing to such contributions, Purandara Dasa earned the honorific Karnataka Sangeeta Pitamaha ("Father of Carnatic Music").

Kanaka Dasa (whose birth name was Thimmappa Nayaka, 1509–1609) of Kaginele (in modern Haveri district) was an ascetic and spiritual seeker who authored important writings such as Mohanatarangini ("River of Delight"), the story of the Hindu god Krishna in sangatya metre; Nrisimhastava, a work dealing with glory of god Narasimha; Nalacharita, the story of Nala, noted for its narration; and Hari Bhaktisara, a spontaneous writing on devotion in shatpadi metre. The latter writing, which deals with niti (morals), bhakti (devotion) and vairagya (renunciation) has become popular as a standard book of learning for children. Kanaka Dasa authored a unique allegorical poem titled Ramadhanya Charitre ("Story of Rama's Chosen Grain"), which exalts ragi over rice. Apart from these classics, about 240 songs written by the Kanaka Dasa are available today.

The Haridasa movement returned to prominence from the 17th through 19th centuries, producing as many as 300 poets in this genre; well known among them are Vijaya Dasa (1682–1755), Gopala Dasa (1721–1769), Jagannatha Dasa (1728–1809), Mahipathi Dasa (1750), Helavanakatte Giriamma and others. Over time, the movement's devotional songs inspired a form of religious and didactic performing art of the Vaishnava people called the Harikatha ("Stories of Hari"). Similar developments were seen among the followers of the Veerashaiva faith who popularised the Shivakatha ("Stories of Shiva").

== Mysore and Keladi period ==
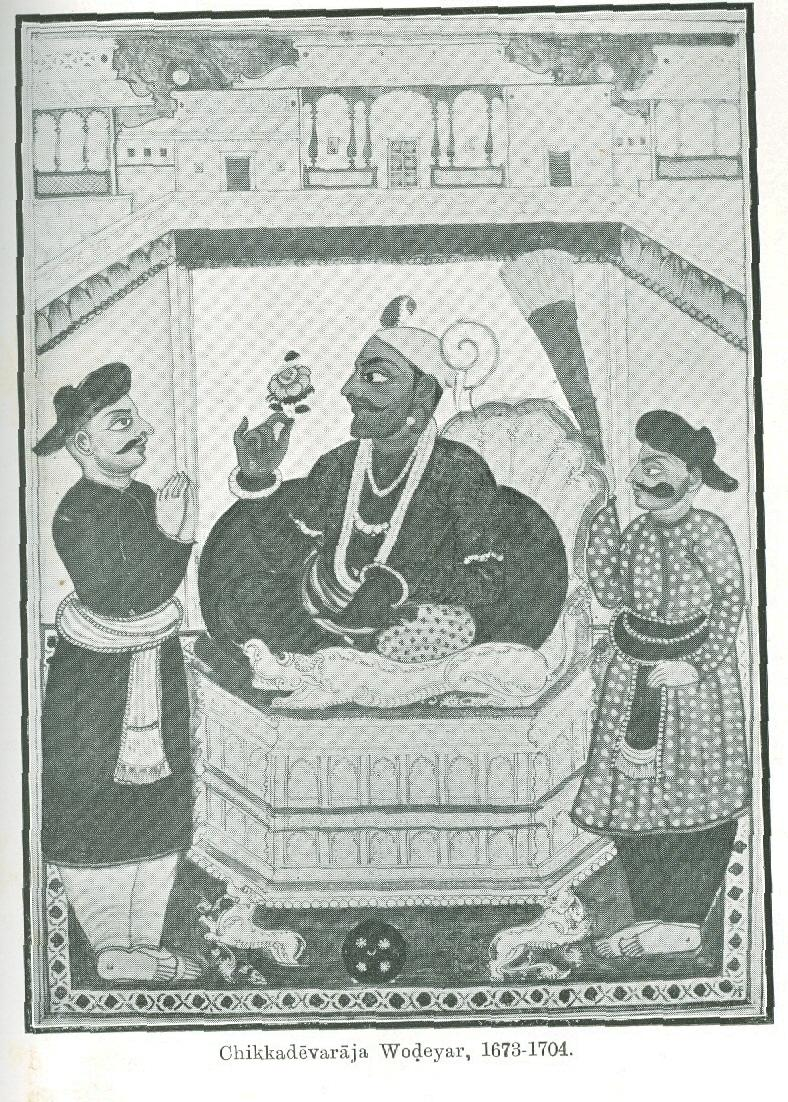
King Chikka Devaraja Wodeyar (1673–1704), writer and patron of Kannada literature

With the decline of the Vijayanagara Empire, the Kingdom of Mysore (ಮೈಸೂರು ಸಾಮ್ರಾಜ್ಯ) (1565–1947) and the kingdom of the Keladi Nayakas (1565–1763) rose to power in the southern and western regions of modern Karnataka respectively. Production of literary texts covering various themes flourished in these courts. The Mysore court was adorned by eminent writers who authored encyclopaedias, epics, and religious commentaries, and composers and musicians. The Keladi court is better known for writings on Veerashaiva doctrine. The Mysore kings themselves were accomplished in the fine arts and made important contributions. A unique and native form of poetic literature with dramatic representation called Yakshagana gained popularity in the 18th century.

Geetha Gopala, a well-known treatise on music, is ascribed to King Chikka Devaraja Wodeyar (1673–1704), the earliest composer of the dynasty, who went by the honorific Sahitya Vidyanikasha Prastharam ("Expert in literature"). Inspired by Jayadeva's Geetha Govinda in Sanskrit, it was written in saptapadi metre. This is the first writing to propagate the Vaishnava faith in the Kannada language.

Also writing in this period was Sarvajna (lit. "The all knowing")—a mendicant and drifter Veerashaiva poet who left a deep imprint on Kannada speaking region and its people. His didactic Vachanas, penned in the tripadi metre, constitute some of Kannada's most celebrated works. With the exception of some early poems, his works focus on his spiritual quest as a drifter. The pithy Vachanas contain his observations on the art of living, the purpose of life and the ways of the world. He was not patronised by royalty, nor did he write for fame; his main aim was to instruct people about morality.

The writing of Brahmin author Lakshmisa (or Lakshmisha), a well-known story-teller and a dramatist, is dated to the mid-16th or late 17th century. The Jaimini Bharata, his version of the epic Mahabharata written in shatpadi metre, is one of the most popular poems of the late medieval period. A collection of stories, the poem includes the tale of the Sita Parityaga ("Repudiation of Sita"). The author successfully converted a religious story into a very human tale; it remains popular even in modern times.

The period also saw advances in dramatic works. Though there is evidence that theatre was known from the 12th century or earlier, modern Kannada theatre is traced to the rise of Yakshagana (a type of field play), which appeared in the 16th century. The golden age of Yakshagana compositions was tied to the rule of King Kanteerava Narasaraja Wodeyar II (1704–1714). A polyglot, he authored 14 Yakshaganas in various languages, although all are written in the Kannada script. He is credited with the earliest Yakshaganas that included sangeeta (music), nataka (drama) and natya (dance).

Mummadi Krishnaraja Wodeyar (1794–1868), the ruler of the princely state of Mysore, was another prolific writer of the era. More than 40 writings are attributed to him, including a poetic romance called Saugandika Parinaya written in two versions, sangatya and a drama. His reign signalled the shift from classical genres to modern literature which was to be complemented by the influence of colonial period of India.

== Modern period ==
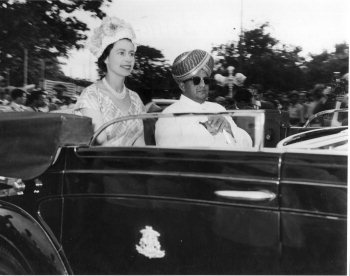
Maharaja and writer, Jayachamaraja Wodeyar Bahadur (1940–1947) with Queen Elizabeth II

The development of modern Kannada literature can be traced to the early 19th century when Maharaja Krishnaraja Wodeyar III and his court poets moved away from the ancient champu form of prose toward prose renderings of Sanskrit epics and plays. Kempu Narayana's Mudramanjusha ("Seal Casket", 1823) is the first modern novel written in Kannada.

Modern Kannada literature was cross-fertilized by the colonial period in India as well., with translations of Kannada works and dictionaries into European languages as well as other Indian languages, and vice versa, and the establishment of European style newspapers and periodicals in Kannada. In addition, in the 19th century, interaction with European technology, including new printing techniques accelerated the development of modern literature.

The first Kannada newspaper called Mangalore Samachara was published by Hermann Mögling in 1843; and the first Kannada periodical, Mysuru Vrittanta Bodhini was published by Bhashyam Bhashyacharya in Mysore around the same time. Hermann Mögling translated Kannada classics into a series called Bibliotheca Carnataca during 1848–1853., while British officers Benjamin L. Rice and J. H. Fleet edited and published critical editions of literary classics, contemporary folk ballads and inscriptions. Following the rich tradition of dictionaries in Kannada since the 11th century, the first dictionaries expressing meanings of Kannada words in European languages were published in the 19th century, the most prominent of them being Ferdinand Kittel's Kannada-English dictionary in 1894.

There was a push towards original works in prose narratives and a standardisation of prose during the late 19th century. Translations of works from English, Sanskrit and other Indian languages like Marathi and Bengali continued and accelerated. Lakshman Gadagkar's Suryakantha (1892) and Gulvadi Venkata Rao's Indira Bai (1899) signalled the move away from the highly stylised mores and aesthetics of prior Kannada works to modern prose, establishing the modern novel genre and fundamentally influencing the essay, literary criticism and drama genres.

=== Navodaya – a period of modern literature ===
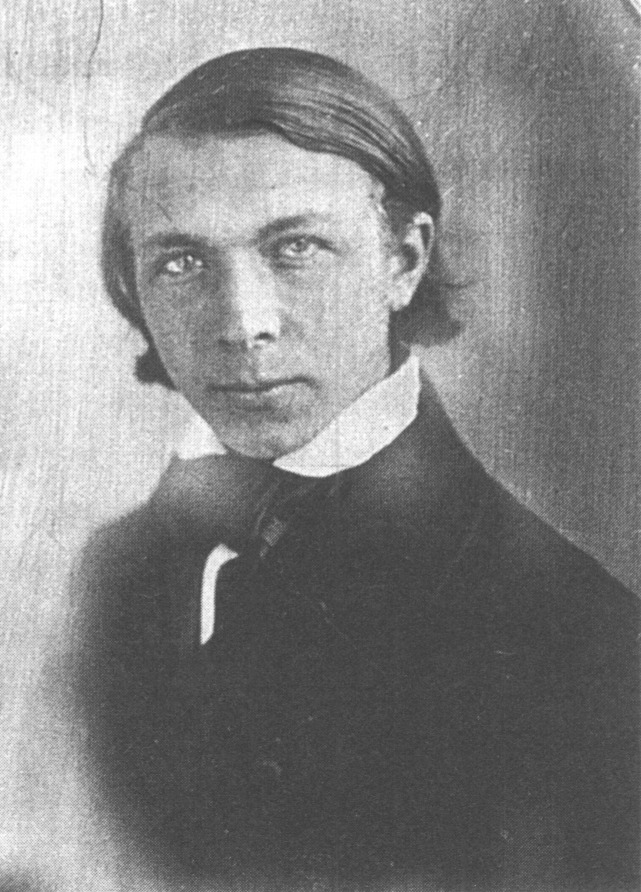
Ferdinand Kittel (1832–1903), Christian missionary and writer of Kannada-English dictionary

At the dawn of the 20th century, B. M. Srikantaiah ('B. M. Sri'), regarded as the "Father of modern Kannada literature", called for a new era of writing original works in modern Kannada while moving away from archaic Kannada forms. This paradigmatic shift spawned an age of prolificacy in Kannada literature and came to be dubbed the Navodaya (lit. 'A new rise') period—a period of awakening. B. M. Sri led the way with his English Geethagalu ("English Songs")—a collection of poems translated from English set the tone for more translations using a standardisation of a modern written idiom. Original and seminal works which drew greatly from native and folk traditions also emerged alongside the translations. Stalwarts like S. G. Narasimhachar, Panje Mangesha Rao and Hattiangadi Narayana Rao also contributed with celebrated efforts. Literary subjects now veered from discussing kings and gods to more humanistic and secular pursuits. Kannada writers experimented with several forms of western literature, the novel and the short story in particular. The novel found an early champion in Shivaram Karanth while another prominent writer, Masti Venkatesh Iyengar ('Masti'), laid the foundation for generations of story tellers to follow with his Kelavu Sanna Kathegalu ("A few Short Stories", 1920) and Sanna Kathegalu ("Short Stories", 1924).

The consolidation of modern drama was pioneered by T. P. Kailasam, with his Tollu Gatti ("The Hollow and the Solid", 1918). Kailasam followed this with Tali Kattoke Cooline ("Wages for tying the Mangalsutra"), a critique on the dowry system in marriage. His plays mainly focused on problems affecting middle class Brahmin families: the dowry system, religious persecution, woes in the extended family system and exploitation of women. Novels of the early 20th century promoted a nationalist consciousness in keeping with the political developments of the time. While Venkatachar and Galaganath translated Bankim Chandra and Harinarayana Apte respectively, Gulvadi Venkata Rao, Kerur Vasudevachar and M. S. Puttanna initiated the movement toward realistic novels with their works. Aluru Venkatarao's Karnataka Gatha Vaibhava had a profound influence on the movement for Karnataka's unification.

1925–50 – The Golden harvest

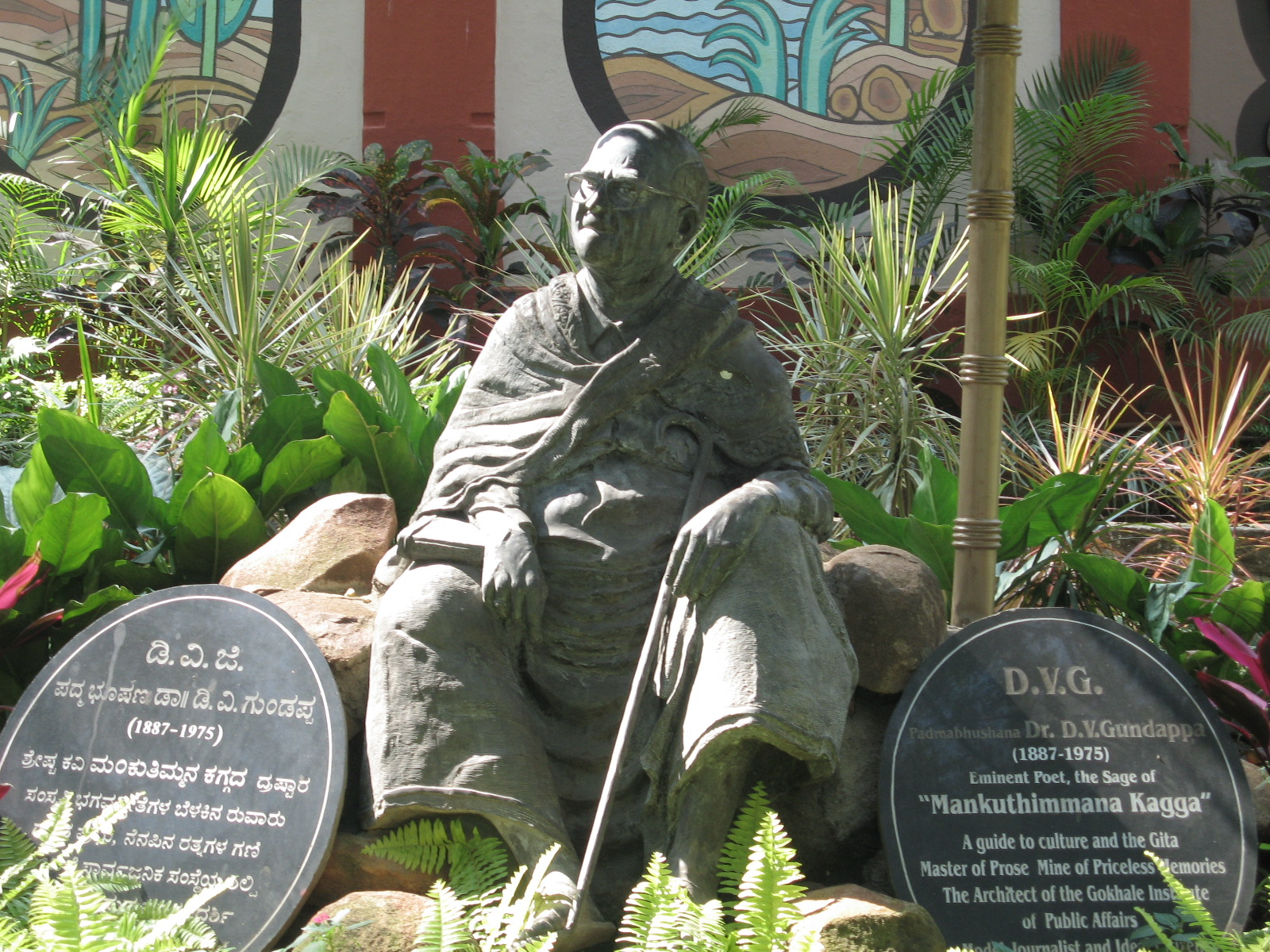
D. V. Gundappa statue in Bugle Rock Park, Basavanagudi area of Bangalore

While the first quarter of the 20th century was a period of experiment and innovation, the succeeding quarter was one of creative achievement. This period saw the rise of acclaimed lyricists whose works combined native folk songs and the mystic poetry of the medieval vachanas and kirthanas with influences from modern English romantics. D. R. Bendre, with his collection of 27 poems including such masterpieces as Gari ("Wing", 1932), Nadaleele (1938) and Sakhigeetha (1940), was perhaps the most outstanding Kannada lyricist of the period. His poems covered a wide range of themes including patriotism, love of nature, conjugal love, transcendental experiences and sympathy for the poor. Govinda Pai narrated the story of Christ's crucifixion in his work Golgotha (1931). The success of this work encouraged Pai to follow with three panegyrics in 1947; Vaishakhi, Prabhasa and Dehali, narrated the last days of the Buddha, God Krishna and Gandhi respectively. His Hebberalu ("Thumb", 1946) dramatises the story of Drona and Ekalavya, characters from the epic Mahabharata.

K.V. Puttappa ('Kuvempu'), who would subsequently become Kannada's first Jnanpith awardee, demonstrated great talent in writing blank verse with his magnum opus Sri Ramayana Darshanam (1949). This work marks the beginning of modern Kannada epic poetry. The work, through the use of metaphors and similes, focuses on the concept that all living creatures will eventually evolve into perfect beings. Other important works of the period are Masti's Navaratri and P. T. Narasimhachar's Hanathe. D. V. Gundappa's Mankuthimmana Kagga ("Dull Thimma's Rigmarole", 1943) harkened back to the wisdom poems of the late medieval poet Sarvajna. A celebrated writer of conjugal love poems, K. S. Narasimhaswamy won critical acclaim for Mysore Mallige ("Mysore Jasmine", 1942), a description of the bliss of everyday marital life.

Growth in poetic drama was inspired by B.M. Sri's Gadayuddha Natakam (1925), an adaptation of Ranna's medieval epic. While Kuvempu and B.M. Sri were inspired by old Kannada, Masti and later P. T. Narasimhachar ('Pu. Ti. Na') explored modern sensibilities in their Yashodhara (1938) and Ahalye (1940). The 1930s saw the emergence of Sriranga, who joined forces with Samsa and Kailasam to pen some of the most successful plays in Kannada. Samsa completed his trilogy about Ranadhira Kantirava, a Mysore king of yore, with his Vijayanarasimha (1936) and Mantrashakti (1938). Kailasam's mastery over wit and stage rhetoric come to the fore in his Home Rule (1930) and Vaidyana Vyadi ("A Doctors Ailment", 1940) while he explores his serious side in Bhahishkara (1929); with Soole ("Prostitute", 1945), he unleashed his contempt for outdated quasi-religious mores. Societal ills were also examined in Bendre's Nageya Hoge ("Fumes of Laughter", 1936), and in Karanth's Garbhagudi ("Sanctum", 1932), which decried the exploitation of society in the name of religion.

The novel came of age during this period, with Karanth (Chomana Dudi, 1933), Masti (Subbanna, 1928) and Kuvempu ("Subbamma Heggadathi of Kanur", 1936) leading the charge. Significantly, writers chose to carry on from where Puttanna, Gulvadi and Kerur had left off around the start of the 20th century rather than continue with popular translations in the style of Venkatachar and Galaganath. Aesthetic concerns replaced the didactic and a sense of form developed. Devudu Narasimha Shastri distinguished himself with his Antaranga (1931) and Mayura (1928); the former was a much acclaimed work which delved into the psychology of the protagonist, while the latter was a historical novel tracing the emergence of the Kadamba dynasty. Another high point of this period is Karanth's Marali Mannige (1942), the saga of three generations of a family, reflecting the social, cultural and economic developments of over a hundred years.

Literary criticism, which had its beginnings in the first quarter-century, also made significant progress. B.M. Sri's Kannada Sahitya Charitre (1947), Gundappa's Sahitya Shakti (1950), Masti's Adikavi Valmiki (1935), Bendre's Sahitya Hagu Vimarshe ("Literature and Criticism", 1932) and Krishna Shastry's Samskrita Nataka (1937) are particularly notable. The essay, another form adopted from western literature, was richly served by A N Murthy Rao (Hagaluganasugalu, 1937), Gorur Ramaswamy Iyengar's ('Gorur') humorous Halliya Chitragalu (1930) and Karanth's Hucchu manassina Hattu mukhagalu (1948).

=== Late Navodaya and the rise of the progressives ===
As the Navodaya period waxed, the Pragatishila (progressives) movement led by novelist A. N. Krishna Rao ('Anakru') gained momentum in the early 1940s. This left-leaning school contended that literature must be an instrument of social revolution and considered the Navodaya to be the product of aesthetes, too puritanical to be of any social relevance. This movement drew both established and young writers into its fold and, while it produced no poetry or drama of special merit, its contributions to short story and novel forms were appreciable. Pragatishila was credited with broadening readers' horizons; works produced during this period dealt extensively with subjects of everyday life, rural themes and the common man. The language was less inhibited and made generous use of colloquialism and slang. Anakru himself was a prolific writer of novels but the best works of this school are attributed to T. R. Subba Rao ('Ta Ra Su'), Basavaraju Kattimani and Niranjana. T. R. Subba Rao initially wrote short stories, although he later turned his talents to novels, which were popular. His early novels, Purushavatara and Munjavininda Munjavu, told the stories of the underprivileged, the downtrodden and the outcast. Best known among his novels—some of whose plots are centred on his native Chitradurga—are Masanada Hoovu ("Flower from a cemetery"), a story about the plight of prostitutes, and historical novel Hamsa Gite ("Swan Song"), a story about a dedicated musician of the late 18th century during annexation of Chitradurga by Tipu sultan.

Marked as its influence had been, the Pragatishila wave was already in decline by the close of the 1950s. Legendary writers of the previous era continued to produce notable works in the Navodaya style. In poetry, Bendre's Naku Tanti ("Four Strings", 1964) and Kuvempu's Aniketana (1964) stand out. V.K. Gokak brought out the innate insufficiencies of the more advanced western cultures in Indilla Nale (1965). Navodaya-style novels continued to be successful with such noteworthy works as Karanth's Mookajjiya Kanasugalu ("Mookajji's visions", 1968), where Karanth explored the origins of man's faith in the mother goddess and the stages of evolution of civilisation. Kuvempu's Malegallali Madumagalu ("The Bride of the Hills", 1967) is about loving relationships that exist in every level of society.

Masti's two classic novels of this era were Channabasavanayaka (1950), which describe the defeat of Bidanur's chief Channabasava Nayaka (on Karnataka's coast) by Haider Ali in the late 18th century, and Chickavirarajendra (1950), which describes the fall of the tiny kingdom of Coorg (ruled by Chikka Virarajendra) to the British East India Company. The common theme in both works is the despotism and tyranny of the incumbent native rulers resulting in the intervention of a foreign power appearing on the scene to restore order, but with its own imperialistic intentions.

S. L. Bhyrappa, a charismatic young writer, first came to attention in the 1960s with his first novel Dharmasri, although it was his Vamsavriksha ("Family Tree", 1966) that put him in the spotlight as one of Kannada's most popular novelists. It is a story of a respected scholar, Srinivasa Srotri, his family and their long-held values. The protagonist's young and widowed daughter-in-law wishes to remarry, putting his family tradition at risk. Bhyrappa's best novel of the period was Grihabhanga ("Breaking of a Home", 1970), a story of a woman surviving under tragic circumstances. The characters in the story are rustic and often use vulgar language. His other important novel is Parva, a major work in Kannada fiction acclaimed as an admirable attempt at recreating life on the sub-continent during the time of the epic Mahabharata.

=== Navya ===
Seated L to R: Masti Venkatesh Iyengar, D. V. Gundappa, Kuvempu, M. V. Seetharamiah, K. Shivaram Karanth, A.N. Krishna Rao (Anakru) and G.P. Rajarathnam

In the 1950s, even as the Pragatishila merged back into the Navodaya mainstream, a new modernist school of writing called Navya emerged. Though formally inaugurated by V. K. Gokak with his Navya Kavitegalu ("Modern Poems", 1950), it was Gopalakrishna Adiga who best exemplified the ethos of the movement. Poetry and, later, the short story became the most effective vehicles of the movement. With the passing of the Gandhian era and its influences, a new era in which to express modern sensibilities had arrived. The Navya writers questioned the time-honoured standards of plot of the Navodaya; life was seen not as a pursuit of already existing values, but as an introspective search for them, occasionally narrated in stream of consciousness technique. Events and details were increasingly treated metaphorically and the short story grew closer to poetry. Gopalakrishna Adiga is considered the father of this form of expression with his Nadedu Banda Dari ("The Path Traversed", 1952) where he sought inspiration from T. S. Eliot and W. H. Auden. His other well-known poems include Gondalapura ("Pandemonium", 1954) and Bhoota (1959).

G. S. Shivarudrappa made his mark in the Navya period with Mumbai Jataka ("A Horoscope of Bombay", 1966), which takes a closer look at urbanised society in Mumbai. A protégé of Kuvempu, Shivarudrappa's fame came the peak of popularity of romantic poems with his Samagma ("Songs of Equanimity", 1951), poems distinguished by an idealistic bent. He continued to write poems in the same vein, although in his later poems there is a gradual shift to social issues with a streak of admiration for god's creation. His critical essay, Anuranana (1980), is about the Vachana poets of the 12th century, their tradition, style and influence on later poets.

K. S. Narasimhaswamy remained prominent through this era, writing such landmark poems as Silalate ("The Sculptured Creeper", 1958) and Gadiyaradangadiya Munde ("Before the Clock Shop"). Chandrashekhara Kambar, Chandrashekar Patil, P. Lankesh, and K. S. Nissar Ahmed are among the best-known later generation Navya poets.

Outstanding playwrights from this period are Girish Karnad, P. Lankesh, Chandrashekhara Kambara and Chandrashekar Patil. Karnad's Tughlaq (1964) portrays violence caused by idealism gone astray. Considered an important creation in Kannada theatre, the play depicts the 14th-century Sultan of Delhi, Mohammad Tughlaq in contrasting styles, a tyrannical and whimsical ruler and at the same time, an idealist who sought the best for his subjects. Most plays written by Karnad have either history or mythology as their theme, with a focus on their relevance to modern society.

The most acclaimed novel of the era was Samaskara by U.R.Anantha Murthy (1965). The novel details the search for new values and identity by the protagonist, a Brahmin, who had sexual intercourse with the untouchable mistress of his heretic adversary. Another notable work is the Swarupa (1966) by Poornachandra Tejaswi. Anantha Murthy's Prasne (1963) contains his best collection of short stories including Ghatashraddha, which describes the tragedy that befell a young pregnant widow, from the point of view of a boy. His collection Mouni (1973) includes the stories Navilugulu ("Peacocks") and Clip Joint.

The Navya movement was not without its critics. The doubt, dilemmas and indecision in every turn of the plot resulted in increasingly sophisticated and complex narrations, which some readers found uninteresting. It was derided as an intellectual exercise of the middle class intelligentsia; in its extreme sophistication, it was thought to have lost its touch with realities of life. This led to a gradual waning of the Navya school as it was supplanted by emerging waves of Navyottara, Bandaya (protest) and Dalit schools.

== Post-modern trends ==
From the early 1970s, a segment of writers including many "Navya" writers started to write novels and stories that were anti-"Navya". This genre was called Navyottara and sought to fulfil a more socially responsible role. The best-known authors in this form of writing were Poornachandra Tejaswi and Devanur Mahadeva. In his preface to Abachurina Post Office, Tejaswi expressed a path breaking observation towards then prevailing literary movements. Tejaswi won the "most creative novel of the year" for his Karvalo in 1980 and Chidambara Rahasya in 1985 from the Sahitya Akademi.

Modernisation and westernisation continue to inform sensibilities and spawn new literary techniques and genres. The most striking developments in recent times have been the rise of the prose form to a position of predominance – a position earlier held by poetry – and the prodigious growth in dramatic literature. More recently Bandaya (Rebellion) and Dalit literature, in some ways a throwback to the Pragatishila (Progressivism) days, have come to the fore. Mahadeva's Marikondavaru ("Those who sold themselves") and Mudala Seemeli Kole Gile Ityadi ("Murder in the Eastern Region") are examples of this trend.

Kannada writers have been presented with 8 Jnanpith awards, 63 Sahitya Akademi awards and 9 Sahitya Akademi Fellowships in India, and numerous other national and international awards since India's independence.
