= Ferdinand Kittel =

German missionary and linguist of Kannada

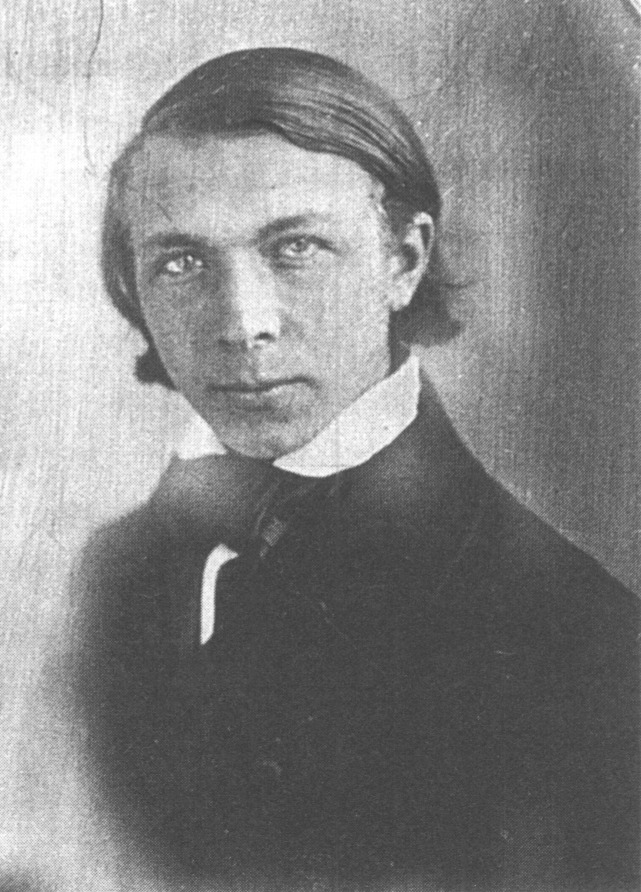
- Ferdinand Kittel (1854)
- Born: 7 April 1832; Resterhafe, East Frisia, Germany
- Died: 18 December 1903 (aged 71); Tübingen
- Occupations: Christian Priest, Kannada research writer.
- Writing career
- Subject: Kannada literature

Ferdinand Kittel (7 April 1832 – 18 December 1903) was a Lutheran priest and indologist with the Basel Mission in south India and worked in Mangalore, Madikeri and Dharwad in Karnataka. He is most famous for his studies of the Kannada language and for producing a Kannada-English dictionary of about 70,000 words in 1894. He also composed numerous Kannada poems.

== Early life ==
Kittel was born 7 April 1832 in Resterhafe, East Frisia, off the northwestern coast of Germany. His father, Gottfried Christian Kittel, was a priest. His mother was Helen Hubert. Kittel was the eldest of five children. His education was praised by the headmaster as "Never Less Than Good." He joined the Basel Mission at the wish of his father.

== In India ==
Kittel learned Hebrew, Greek, Latin, French and English. He arrived in India in 1853. As a missionary, he endeavoured to follow Paul's first Epistle to the Corinthians and "become as an Indian unto the Indians".

Having a strong desire to learn Kannada, he undertook exhaustive studies learning the Kannada language, customs and local music. This earned rebuke from the Basel Mission, where he was already an outsider on account of his North German origin and academic education (the other missionaries were chiefly from southwest Germany and the lower/middle classes, though Gottfried Weigle had studied at Tübingen). This marginalised him by pushing him to a remote station in the Nilgiris and later confining him to the mission's press in Mangalore. He returned to Germany, but visited India again in his fifties to complete his dictionary, which by then had become for him an end in itself, and not merely an instrument secondary to missionary work.

== Contribution to Kannada ==
Kittel worked in Mangalore, Madikeri and Dharwad in Karnataka, inspired by and attracted to Kannada literature.

He is most famous for his studies of the Kannada language and for producing a Kannada-English dictionary of about 70,000 words in 1894. (Many Kannada-language dictionaries had existed at least since poet Ranna's 'Ranna Khanda' in the tenth century.) Kittel also composed numerous Kannada poems.

In 1862, Kittel, published his Kannada poem `Kathamale' which presented the life of Jesus Christ in the form of Indian musical metre style. Kittel also wrote a book on Kannada grammar called A Grammar of the Kannada Language: Comprising the Three Dialects of the language. He translated Nagavarma's work on Kannada prosody.

== Contemporary recognition ==
Kittel is today almost forgotten in Germany, but is still widely recognised in Karnataka. Many educational institutions have been named after him. A statue at the end of Mahatma Gandhi road in the city of Bangalore commemorates him. Austin Town in Bangalore was renamed "Kittel Nagar".

== Legacy ==
The book An Indian to the Indians? On the Initial Failure and the Posthumous Success of the Missionary Ferdinand Kittel (1832–1903), edited by Reinhard Wendt, describes various aspects of his work.

== See also ==
- Herman Gundert
- Kannada language
- Kannada grammar
- Shabdamanidarpana
- Thomas Hodson
- William Reeve
- Hermann Mögling
- Njattyela Sreedharan
