= Indira Bai =

- Author: Gulavadi Venkata Rao
- Language: Kannada
- Publication date: 1899
- Publication place: India
- Pages: 218
- ISBN: 9383052694

Indira Bai is an Indian novel in the Kannada language written by Gulavadi Venkata Rao (1844–1913). Published in 1899, it is considered the first modern novel in Kannada. It dealt with the hitherto ostracized practice of widow remarriage. A social novel set in present-day coastal Karnataka, and allegedly based on real incidents, it portrays a society in transition. Supporting widow remarriage, it denounces social evils like corruption in the bureaucracy and the reactionary attitude of established religious institutions and takes a critical view of contemporary society.

== Plot summary ==
Indira Bai depicts the story of Indira, a child widow. Indira is an only child that is married, before the age of puberty, to an older man that is apathetic to her experience. Her husband is depicted as financially unwise and ignores her completely following their marriage for luxurious living. Indira, pining in unrequited sentiment for her husband, turns to reading for solace after her mother Ambabai's advice. However, her mother is unsupportive of the material within the books Indira chooses to read, describing the novels as being written by “the mlechchha padres meant to destroy our caste.” Following the death of her husband, Indira lives as a child widow. She is restricted by practises that dictate the colour of clothes she must wear, and is not allowed to groom her hair. Indira's parents leave her with a group of wandering widows that sing hymns, as they fear Indira's readings may be negatively shaping her attitudes. However, Indira is wary of the group's leader and runs away. Indira hides with another young student at a lawyer's house. The lawyer, Amritaraya and his wife Jalajakshi are socially progressive individuals. Under their care, Indira is able to pursue her interests and they also send her to school. The school, Saraswati Mandir, is especially concerned with educating young women. Together, the lawyer and his wife nourish Indira's youth and support her by challenging orthodox notions surrounding child marriage and child widows. The novel ends with Indira reuniting with her parents.

== Characters ==
Indira Bai is the central character of the novel. Indira is a young girl, who after her husband's death, becomes a child widow.

Bhimarao is Indira's father.

Ambabai is Indira's mother.

Amritaraya is a reformist lawyer who takes Indira under his wing.

Jalajakshi is Amritaraya's wife.

Bhaskara is a student that is also living with Amritaraya. He is “the son of a Sundararaya whom Indira’s parents poisoned several years ago.”

== Setting ==
A central focus of Indira Bai is the “encounter…between colonial modernity and the Saraswat Brahman community.” Furthermore, the novel is centralised in South Canara, a “naturally trilingual region with Tulu, Konkani, and Kannada being the three main spoken languages.” In his novel Rao incorporates all three languages to accurately depict the socio-contextual tensions of his contemporary, whilst also incorporating elements of “colonial modernity” such as western science, medicine, and technology. Furthermore, Rao creates a “cultural landscape” in the novel through his incorporation of Sanskrit discourses and music.

== Contextual Influence ==
Indira Bai's central thematic focus is widow remarriage, and education the “device for emancipation.”

Gulavadi Venkatarao graduated university with a BA. However, before his career in novel writing, Gulavadi Venkatarao worked in the local police department, within which he was introduced to the treatment of child widows in his contemporary.

Gulvadi Venkata Rao's contextual experiences living in the Saraswat Brahmin community in the nineteenth century significantly influenced the novel's focus on caste located transformations. The novel's publishing coincided with the institution of the printing press, which allowed for the dissemination of Rao's novel to “construct modernity in the Canarese region.”

Bilimale outlines the history underpinning the emergence of the novel medium. Specifically, the involvement of the educated Saraswath Brahmin class’ involvement in the rebellion against customs of their religion. The Saraswath class was the first to receive access to education due to their class privilege. This high social background and literacy skill allowed them advantage in processing English education. This exposure to diverse education led to the Saraswaths interrogating and aligning against traditional religious ideology and custom, leading debates on topics such as “education for women, widow remarriage, disfigurement of widows,” etc. This conflict of ideology allowed for progressive literature to emerge in Rao's contemporary. Bilimale describes the emerging position of the novel form within this social climate as “an important medium in which to portray this conflict and to articulate the terms for its revolution.”

Bilimale describes Indira Bai's plot within the context of Venkata Rao's contemporary as a reflection of societal frictions. Bilimale highlights how the characters representing tradition, such as Bheema Rao, are framed as “hypocritical and dishonest,” whereas characters educated with progressive ideologies are “mature and honest.” The subtext of the novel hence implies that characters that align with “western rationality” are “good.” Furthermore, Bilimale goes on to argue that the novel reads as a satire since “the tension between opposing values is resolved outside the structure of the novel.”

Furthermore, Bilimale describes the novel's optimistic approach towards “coming history” as characteristic of many early Kannada novels.

Critical outlooks have pointed out how while the love present in the relationship between Indira and her second husband, Bhaskar, is foregrounded in Indira's remarriage, there is no “narrative representation” of them “encountering each other” and “acknowledging their love.” The fact that the other characters had the agency and were instrumental to uniting the two, especially how Indira's love for Bhaskar was not previously articulated, highlights how the novel conforms to the social novel's tendency to depict romantic love, without representing “the rites of passage of ‘romance’.”

Pandita Ramabai, a convert Christian and social reformer from South Canara, also significantly influenced the characterisation of Indira Bai. Indira is depicted reading Ramabai’s novels in the novel as a method of rebellion against her Mother Amba Bai.

As articulated by Mukherjee, the Indira Bai’s release occurred in a context where India was experiencing an increase in “long narrative fiction,” where the novel form was utilized as a tool of social reform.

== Modern Translations ==
Indira Bai has been translated into five different languages: Kannada, Konkani, Sanskrit, Tulu, and English.

Indira Bai was first translated into English by ME Couchman in 1903. The novel's second translation, in 2019, is its most recent English translation. Translated by linguists Vanamala Viswanatha and Shivarama Padikkal, the second translation of the novel has been lauded for its representation of “hierarchies of caste and class” present in the original, and its use of footnoting to further contextualise and articulate historical caste practises.

The most recent English translation by Viswanatha and Padikkal is favourably regarded for its employment of linguistic techniques to accurately convey the nuances of Rao's message. Viswanatha and Padikkal retained numerous Kannada phrases in the translation to capture the “intricate pattern of multilingualism” that was present in the original novel, due to Rao's inclusion of “several linguistic and religious communities.” Furthermore, Viswanatha and Padikkal utilized footnotes for additional clarification of meaning. As articulated by both Viswanatha and Padikkal, Rao uses “Konkani, Tulu, and English to mark the social difference among the characters.” This multilingualism is significant to the socio-political commentary Rao's novel foreground.

On the specific literary products of Rao's use of multilingualism, Jayasrinivasa Rao highlighted Rao's use of sarcasm. A section where young men who were only recently educated in English spoke a mix of English and Kannada, the Kannada translations of the English phrases were placed in brackets to heighten the sarcastic tone. Punctuated by descriptions of actions such as using “formal votes of thanks,” performing “elaborate rituals of smoking cigars… and having dessert after dinner” depict these characters as constructing an elaborate and imitative performance, where their language is contrived. Rao goes on to assert this depiction as a representation of social hierarchy using language. The languages of Konkani and Tulu are utilized throughout the novel as representational devices; Tulu is predominantly spoken by the servant characters in the novel; and the only characters speaking Dakshina Kannada, also known as Christian Konkani, are police constables.

On the physical formatting of the various languages within the novel, Rao describes their placement as “bilingual,” in that there are sections where pages have side by side translations of Tulu and Konkani blocks. The Tulu and Konkani scripts themselves are written in Dakshina Kannada to aid comprehension.

Furthermore, Rao continued his exploration of the social themes pioneered in Indirabai in his second novel, Bhagirathi. In the following translation by Jayasrinivassa Rao, Bhagirathi's preface addresses the thematic continuation:

"In the ‘Preface‘ to Indirabai, I had said that truthfulness and purity of heart are the two accomplishments that sustain us in this world and the next. But as long as foolishness and stupidity prevail in us, it is impossible to achieve these goals. This is portrayed through Bhagirathi‘s life. (Venkatarao [1900], quoted in Rai, 1989: 10)"

== Reception ==
Indira Bai was long-listed for the Atta Galatta Bangalore Literature Festival Book Prize in 2019.

The translators of the 2019 translation, Professor Shivarama Padikkal and Professor Vanamala Viswanatha, were also chosen for the Kuvempu Bhasha Bharathi Pradhikara Annual Book Award.

The novel has a 4.33/5 star average ratings on the social cataloguing website Goodreads.

Indira Bai has also been included as a required text in various university literature courses, such as a core textbook for the syllabus of English Language at Mangalore University, selected by its Undergraduate Board of Studies for English.

In recent years, there has been a revival of interest in Indira Bai, specifically due to its representation of Bengaluru. Furthermore, there is an increasing sentiment amongst Kannada readers that contemporary Kannada writing demonstrates a "disregard for urban sensibilities." The locations represented in contemporary novels, specifically their lack of representation of Bengaluru, has revived conversation on Indira Bai's depiction of the locale's culture. Furthermore, the modern focus of the Kannada literary scene has shifted away from novels and towards novellas and short fiction, hence prompting a reconsideration of the first social novel. Rao's depiction of "conflicts faced during the times of colonial modernity, quick urbanising society," and its consequent impact on the domestic and larger socio-political lives of women has a newfound poignancy to the modernist movement in Kannada, where readers are seeking depictions of the urbanizing collective.
