= Kannada grammar =

Grammar of the Kannada language

Kannada grammar (Kannada: ಕನ್ನಡ ವ್ಯಾಕರಣ) describes the structure of the Kannada language, which has a native tradition of grammar dating back to Kēśirāja's treatise, the Śabdamaṇidarpaṇa ("The Jewel Mirror of Language") c. 1260 CE). The Śabdamaṇidarpaṇa continues to be cited by modern writers of literary Kannada. Kannada prior to the 13th century is generally known as ಹಳೆಗನ್ನಡ (haḷegannaḍa), "Old Kannada", in modern scholarship, while the medieval language before the 18th century CE is known as ನಡುಗನ್ನಡ (naḍugannaḍa),"Middle Kannada" or ಮಧ್ಯಕಾಲೀನ ಕನ್ನಡ (madhyakālīna kannaḍa) "Medieval Kannada". In the premodern tradition, Kēśirāja's work remained the literary standard for the Kannada language for centuries until the colonial era when Modern Kannada (ಹೊಸಗನ್ನಡ hosagannaḍa) became systematized for the first time.

The first treatise on Kannada grammar in English was written in 1864 by Rev. Thomas Hodson, a Wesleyan missionary, as An Elementary Grammar of the Kannada, or Canarese Language. Rev. Ferdinand Kittel's A Grammar of the Kannada Language in English remains an authority on the history of the Kannada language, documenting and comparing the ancient, middle and modern stages of Kannada. Modern authorities of Kannada include T.V. Venkatachalashastry, who has written a commentary on the Śabdamaṇidarpaṇa, called the Darpaṇavivaraṇa, and T.N. Srikantaiah, a Kannada educator and scholar who wrote An Intermediate Grammar of Kannada. While many dialects with variant usages exist, the modern form of literary Kannada derived from the grammatical tradition is described here.

== Nouns ==
=== Gender, number, and animacy ===
Modern Kannada nouns are distinguished as human and non-human. This is a feature known as animacy or rationality in Tamil, and is found across other Dravidian languages. Animate nouns can be marked with the masculine or feminine gender, though only certain, native Kannada roots and pronouns require an explicit gender marker. Human beings, deities, and personified animals are treated as animate, while all other nouns are considered inanimate and grammatically neuter (including animals that have biological sex and mass nouns including people). Infants and young children are also typically referred to in the neuter before they can express themselves.

While there are several derivational suffixes that can mark gender, such as -iga/-iti (m./f.), the most common suffixes are the gender-number markers -n, -ḷ, -(a)r, and -gaḷ. The suffixes -n and -ḷ mark the masculine and feminine singular, though this depends on the root. For nouns of Sanskrit origin, the -ḷ ending can be used to derive a feminine noun, but this is often considered archaic in modern Kannada, especially for nouns that are already semantically feminine (ex. strī "woman"). Native Kannada nouns too will opt to use the -n as an epicene (not marking gender) singular, even though verbs and other elements of a sentence may convey a semantically feminine subject.

The suffixes -(a)r and -gaḷ are both epicene but are partially distinguished by animacy. Only human nouns can take -(a)r, but -gaḷ can be taken by all nouns. Nouns ending in -a tend to take the -(a)r plural, while all others take -gaḷ. Both endings can also be used to convey an honorific plural, where the marked noun may be singular, but is treated as grammatically plural to convey respect. A doubled plural combining -(a)r and -gaḷ is not uncommon for titles and nouns referring to respected persons (ex. rājarugaḷu). Furthermore, some nouns can appear with either plural: strīyaru and strīgaḷu both occur. (The a in -(a)r is added in the case of noun roots that don't already end in -(a).)

There is also the kinship plural -andir, which is used exclusively with nouns of Kannada origin that mark family relations (one exception is bhāvandiru "brothers-in-law".) Adjectives marked in the plural can also take the neuter plural ending -(a)vu when qualifying a head noun that is plural or when marking an otherwise unspecified plural subject (ex. "the big ones"). Mass nouns and other phrases which denote plurals semantically are often treated as grammatically singular, a principle known as jātyēkavacana (the "categorical singular").

=== Noun declension ===
Kannada has six morphologically distinct cases: nominative, accusative, instrumental, dative, genitive, and locative. Traditional grammarians have listed the ablative as a separate case function, having modeled Kannada grammar on the Sanskrit tradition, though the instrumental encompasses this meaning. Ashwathanarayana et al recommend the use of the postposition dese ("origin", "cause") in the instrumental to distinguish the ablative in Kannada, but add that it is not a case ending. Sreekantaiya points out that the ablative is not regularly used in this way either. The vocative is also sometimes considered an eighth case, but is usually treated as an application of the -e/ē of emphasis (avadhāraṇa) to the nominative case. The vocative can be expressed by lengthening the final vowel of a noun as well, or in the plural, with the specifically vocative endings -a/ā and -ir/irā, which are usually appended to the nominative.

==== Declensional classes and augments ====
Kannada has six declensional classes, some of which are historically described in the Śabdamaṇidarpaṇa and the grammatical tradition. They are broadly defined by the augments (āgama ) taken to form the oblique, which are stem forms that receive case endings (pratyaya). There are five augments: "zero" (marked Ø), d, in, aṇ, and ar. The "zero" class is called as such because traditional grammars describe the roots' declensions as resulting from sandhi, and thus don't require an augment. Some Old Kannada roots referring to persons had obligatory gender-number markers, which are not usually indicated in the modern language outside of written contexts. The "zero" class assumes the presence of -n, -ḷ, -(a)r, -gaḷ, or -andir in the root to be declined.

The declensional classes derive from their Old Kannada syllable structure, which has changed over time. Many words in Modern Kannada, through its medieval stage, underwent epenthesis by inserting i and u at the ends of certain consonant-final syllables. In Old Kannada, sonorant consonants were permitted at the ends of word roots, and along with short and long root vowels, defined the declensional classes. These sonorants have -u appended at the end in the modern language. The following table explains these classes and their obliques, summarizing B. Ramachandra Rao's description. The augments have been bolded below, and implied augments in the "zero" class have been put in parentheses.

	Subtype	Characteristics	Oblique augment	Example
Class I	1a	Roots that take gender-number markers, including third person pronoun roots ava- and āta-	Ø	tamma(**n**) ("younger brother") ava(**ḷ**) ("she") arasa(**r**) ("king(s)") bandhu(**gaḷ**) ("relatives")
Class I	1b	Roots with sonorant finals -ṇ, -n, y, l, and ḷ; these double following a short vowel	Ø	kāl ("leg") kaṇ**ṇ** ("eye")
Class I	1c	Inanimate nouns with disyllabic roots with final -i and -e	Ø	giḷi(**y**) ("parrot") tale(**y**) ("head")
Class II		Roots ending in -u or -ū	-in	kāḍu ("forest") -> kāḍ**in** hū ("flower") -> hūv**in**
Class III		Sanskrit nouns and inanimate, native Kannada nouns with final -a	-v/d	mēgha(**v**)/mēgha**d** ("cloud") mara(**v**)/mara**d** ("tree")
Class IV		Native Kannada nouns indicating directions and location	-aṇ	keḷage ("down/below") -> kelag**aṇ** mūḍu ("east") -> mūḍ**aṇ**
Class V		Roots denoting number; the oblique of the interrogative ēnu forms in this class	-ar	ondu -> ond**ar** ēnu -> ēt**ar**
Class VI		Pronominal roots in the first and second person	short and long roots in different cases	**nān** ("I") ~ **nan(n)** **nāv** ("we") ~ **nam(m)**

In Modern Kannada, some of these classes are obsolete, particularly in everyday speech. Class Ib and IV tend to be declined as members of Class II, though erudite speakers may continue to use the older augments to emulate the classical language (particularly in writing). Kittel notes that in some places, the genitive form of Class IV nouns (i.e. the stem + -aṇa) has fossilized as a noun unto itself, which is then declined in Class III due to the -a final. The currency of Class V varies from place to place, also sometimes merged in Class II. Nouns of Class 1a tend to be given in dictionaries without their gender-number marker, requiring the speaker to know which marker to apply.

==== Case Endings and Sandhi ====
Case endings in Kannada are appended to the oblique stem described above. Different classes' oblique stem are used for different cases. The oblique is obligatory in all cases for Class I nouns, whereas the other classes only require the oblique in the instrumental-ablative, dative, genitive, and locative.

Each ending comes in an abstract form that may undergo sandhi in contact with the oblique stem. The dative case mark -i(ge) sometimes undergoes sandhi due to the contact of -ge with the stem (becoming -kke), and elsewhere does not due to the interceding -i. Similar to the implied sandhi of Class I, Class III nouns take -v before case endings, which is not considered an augment, but a natural product of sandhi between the final a and vowel-initial case endings. Notice also that oblique of any class with a short root vowel and final sonorant doubles its final consonant before a vowel-initial case ending. This made a rule from Old Kannada (where the final sonorants of short vowels double before vowel-initial endings) a permanent change in Modern Kannada. It is for this reason that such nouns are often declined as Class II nouns in the modern language, as the root form is no longer visible.

The various declensions are described below, with the case ending bolded, and hyphenated where sandhi occurs.

	Class								
Case	Ending	Ia	Ib	Ic	II	III	IV	V	VI
nominative	-u	tamman**u**	kaṇṇ-**u**	giḷiy-**a**	kāḍ-**u**	mara**v-u**	mūḍ-**u**	ond-**u**	nān**u**
accusative	-annu/anna	tamman**annu**	kaṇṇ-**annu**	giḷiy-**a**	kāḍ-**annu**	mara**v-annu**	mūḍ-**annu**	ond-**annu**	nann**-annu**
instrumental-ablative	-inda	tamman**inda**	kaṇṇ-**inda**	giḷiy-**inda**	kāḍin**inda**	marad-**inda**	mūḍaṇ**inda**	ondar-**inda**	nann-**inda**
dative	-(i)ge	tamman**ige**	kaṇṇ-**ige**	giḷi**ge**	kāḍ-**ige**	mara-**kke**	mūḍaṇ**ige**	ondar**ige**/ ond-**akke**	nan**age***
genitive	-a	tamman**a**	kaṇṇ-**a**	giḷiy-**a**	kāḍin**a**	marad**a**	mūḍaṇ**a**	ondar**a**	nann-**a**
locative	-alli	tamman**alli**	kaṇṇ-**alli**	giḷiy-**alli**	kāḍin**alli**	marad**alli**	mūḍaṇ**alli**	ondar**alli**	nann-**alli**
vocative	-ē	tamman**ē**	kaṇṇ-**ē**	giḷiy-**ē**	kāḍ**ē**	mara-**vē**	mūḍ**ē**	ond-**ē**	nān-**ē**

*Exceptional case where sandhi does not double the final sonorant and changes the -i to -a. This occurs in all nouns of this class (ex. nīnu -> ninage, nāvu -> namage). Note in the case of nāvu ("we") and nīvu ("you" pl.), the final v becomes m in its short oblique, a remnant of Old Kannada, where m and v often alternate.

==== Case variation and compound cases ====
In addition to the cases listed above, Kannada exhibits what grammarians call "case variation" (vibhakti-pallaṭa). Recognized as early as Kēśirāja, this phenomenon refers to the use of one case for the meaning of another. This was much more common in Middle Kannada, especially in vernacular poetry. For example, the accusative may be used in the sense of the locative (particularly as a destination), and the locative in the sense of the instrumental. This tends to vary dialectically and it is difficult to establish strict patterns for its occurrence.

Relatedly, Kannada also has a number of postpositions that compound or extend the basic case forms, such as kaiyalli (lit. "in the hand", idiomatically "by means of"), the dative followed by ōskara, expressing "for the sake of", or the dative with -inta ("in this way", "therefrom") forming the comparative. These also tend to vary dialectically, and are not typically acknowledged in the grammatical tradition.

==== Pronouns ====
Kannada pronouns are distinguished in all three persons, and additionally, in a reflexive form (meaning "oneself"). Third person pronouns are additionally marked for gender and distance relative to the speaker. Proximal pronouns express something that is physically or notionally close to the speaker, and distal pronouns express those that are far away.

		**Singular**		**Plural**	
1st person		nānu		nāvu	
2nd person		nīnu		nīvu	
3rd person	gender	proximal	distal	proximal	distal
3rd person	masculine	ivanu	avanu	ivaru	avaru
3rd person	feminine	ivaḷu	avaḷu	ivaru	avaru
3rd person	neuter	iva	adu	idu	avu
Reflexive		tānu		tāvu	

As mentioned in the discussion of the plural, the plural forms may be used to convey an honorific meaning. While the use of the royal "we" is not extremely common in modern speech (outside of historical TV dramas and plays), the honorific uses of the 2nd and 3rd person see regular use. Sometimes, spoken Kannada distinguishes the honorific and non-honorific usages by adding -gaḷu to plural pronouns (ex. nāvugaḷu, nīvugaḷu). Relatedly: since the oblique stem of the third person neuter (avar-) happens to be shared between the singular and plural, some speakers disambiguate this by adding -gaḷu to the third person neuter plural (ex. avugaḷu).

Honorific usages are typically directed at parents, teachers, and others who are regarded with a higher social status, whereas the non-honorifics are freely used between peers, friends and siblings. The reflexive plural pronoun can also be used in a honorific sense, functioning as a highly deferent third person pronoun. This mostly appears in stage drama or, in colloquial speech, sarcastic address:

ಎಲ್ಲಿಗೆ ಹೋಗುತ್ತಿದ್ದೀರಿ ತಾವು?
ellige hōguttiddīri tāvu?
Where is your esteemed self going?

In addition to honorific usages, there are additional pronouns that convey a sense of social distance or non-intimacy. The pronouns ātanu (proximal: ītanu) and āke (proximal: īke) mark masculine and feminine referents to whom the speaker does not feel close or with whom they are unfamiliar. While exact practice varies among different speakers, the use of these pronouns, compared to those in the table, can be seen as disrespectful or unnecessarily aloof. Similarly, the dynamics of 2nd person pronouns is quite context-dependent: for some Kannada speakers, it is not unusual to address one's mother with nīnu (the non-honorific, considered here to be intimate), where others may be accustomed to using nīvu (the honorific) and find nīnu disrespectful.

== Adjectives ==
Kannada adjectives (guṇavācaka) are unique in that only around fifty native roots function as true adjectives, not including Sanskrit loans. Numbers and demonstrative adjectives (ī "this" and ā "that") can be used to indicate definiteness, though attributive use of nouns and adjectives is more common.

Kittel points out that many Kannada adjectives, whether Sanskrit or native in origin, behave partly like nouns. This is due to the fact that native roots can be used to modify nouns by appending -u and -(a)vu to -i/e final roots and (a)du and -(a)duvu to -a/u final and sonorant-final roots respectively as number-agreeing markers, though this is not obligatory in speech. It is required when used as standalone nouns, especially if they refer to persons marked with a pronoun: cikkavaḷu ("she who is younger") or eḷeyavaru ("they who are short"). However, adjectives are not declined when they modify a noun.

In the modern colloquial language, there exists a holdover from Middle Kannada, where the final vowel of disyllabic adjectives can be lengthened when they agree with a stated noun (ex. biḷī kūdalu "white hair") for biḷiya kūdalu). Similarly, some sonorant-final adjectives (vis à vis Old Kannada) and -a/u final adjectives take a long ē (ex. oḷḷē mātu "kind words" for oḷḷu matu).

Sanskrit nouns tend to use the past participle ಆದ -āda ("which became/is") to modify a noun, or else use an adjective directly borrowed from Sanskrit.

ಸುಂದರವಾದ ಹೆಂಗಸು
sundaravāda hengasu
a beautiful woman

ಐತಿಹಾಸಿಕ ದಿನ
aitihāsika dina
a historic day

== Syntax ==
Kannada word order is generally defined as SOV, though other combinations are permitted (especially in poetry) due to extensive marking of syntactic functions through case and conjugation. Grammarians describe Kannada syntax as strongly determined by the presence of a finite verb, as adverbs typically precede them and noun phrases (including adjectives) containing agents and objects must precede the finite verb. While Kannada does not morphologically distinguish transitivity, the absence of a marked object for a normally transitive (sakarmaka) verb to be understood as intransitive (akarmaka). Certain verb derivations, such as the causative and passive (which is a periphrastic construction), can change a sentence to mark an object as an experiencer or a subject as an object, but verbs themselves do not indicate voice.

The centrality of the finite verb is reinforced in Kannada grammatical tradition, which regulates the occurrence of multiple non-finite verbs with separate agents (bhinnakartṛgaḷu). Sreekantaiya and Kittel write the succession of a finite verb phrase after a non-finite verb phrase with a distinct agent typically suggests a relation of causation or the lapse of time. When the subject is singular, the succession of verbs may indicate manner or other kinds of results. In spoken Kannada, it is not unusual for this rule to be broken, but there is a broad preference for simple subject-predicate clauses.

== Verbs ==
Like nouns, Kannada verbal roots (dhātu) or "themes" (in Kittel's description) are distributed across different classes or groups (gaṇa), based primarily on their syllabic structure, as is the case in other Dravidian languages. Kannada verbs can be conjugated for tense, aspect, mood, person, number, and gender (in the third person), taking various personal endings to form finite verbs (purṇakriye). Kannada verbs can also take on various non-finite forms (kriyānyūna), including adjectival and adverbial participles, verbal nouns (bhāvavacana or bhāvārtha), infinitives, and conditionals (pakṣārtha).

Like other Dravidian languages, Kannada's tenses are distinguished primarily as past and non-past, though there are finer distinctions made in the literary language compared with the spoken language. Aspect is often conveyed by periphrastic forms that combine a basic tense with participles to form more complex meanings. Certain dialects of Northern Kannada, such as Dharwar Kannada, preserve certain forms of Middle Kannada that are not found in Southern Kannada.

=== Present-future or non-past ===
The suffix -utta marks the present and future tenses as well as the continuous or progressive aspect, distinguished only by contextual clues. This suffix can be attached to any verb directly, taking the glides y and v by sandhi. While this is the common present-future form in Modern Kannada, there is a future tense that is derived from the classical present-future, marked by suffix -va on the verb root. This tense is more broadly an aorist paradigm, since it does not strictly mark the future, conveying habitual action, obligation, and expectation. The use of the aorist-future in its classical meaning is reserved to educated writing and speech. The common present-future, since it contrasts primarily with the past, is also called the non-past. Therefore, the three main tenses of Kannada are non-past, past, and aorist-future.

The non-past forms use the root form of a verb as the stem, which receives the personal endings and also functions as a participial form. The non-past is marked by -utta and -va, though differ in meaning. Where -utta is an adverbial participle that can modify verbs, -va is an adjectival participle and can be used to modify nouns.

Modern Kannada generally appends -u when a root ends in a vowel other than u (ex. māḍu "to do" + va -> māḍutta/māḍuva but naḍe "to walk" -> naḍeyutta/naḍeyuva). This is a carryover from Middle Kannada, where clustered consonants began to split apart, and this sometimes extended to vowel-final settings as well. Erudite writing and speech, especially among those conversant with the classical tradition, may sometimes reverse this change consciously and restore the classical forms in the literary future: naḍe + va -> naḍeva.

The personal endings vary between the non-past, past, and aorist-future. The endings of the non-past are as follows:

Present-Future
		Singular	Plural
**1st person**		-ēne	-ēve
**2nd person**		-(īy)e	-īri
**3rd person**	masculine	-āne	-āre
**3rd person**	feminine	-āḷe	-āre
**3rd person**	neuter	-ade	-ave

In Northern varieties of Kannada, a different present-future form is used, developing from the historically compound or periphrastic present-future suffix -dapa. In this form, the past stem is used as a base, followed by a dialectical form of iru ("to be/exist/remain") and alu (also historically "to be" or "to be fit"). This latter component derives from Old Kannada present-future forms with the -va suffix, forming irpa and appa due to sandhi. Southern and other varieties of Kannada dissolved the sandhi entirely, yielding the form iruva.

This ending evolved into ippa/appa without differentiation, and eventually simply -pa by the time of Kēśirāja, who does not recognize it as a compound tense at all. The -dapa form took personal endings as other finite verbs due, and eventually the -pa became -ha as the result of a regular sound shift that took place in Kannada roots and vernacularized forms of Sanskrit words (prākṛta or tadbhava). The modern form that occurs in Northern Kannada appears with the following endings (note that the d is the past sign here, which undergoes sandhi in certain verbs; see next section on the past tense):

Present-Future (Northern)
		Singular	Plural
**1st person**		-dahe(nu)	-dahevu
**2nd person**		-dahe/dahi	-dahiri
**3rd person**	masculine	-dahanu	-daharu
**3rd person**	feminine	-dahaḷu	-daharu
**3rd person**	neuter	-dahudu	-dahavu

=== The past tense and conjugational classes ===
Kannada verbs fall into one of six classes, based on the way they form their past participle. The specific patterns of each class result from sandhi that occurred in Old and Middle Kannada, where the boundary between the past sign and the root was more evident. The basic past sign is -(i)du, which is suffixed to any verb root, and may undergo sandhi.

The table below describes the different verb classes, principally drawing on B. Ramachandra Rao's description of Old Kannada, and making adjustments for Modern Kannada. The main difference between Old Kannada and Modern Kannada roots is the addition of an -u at the end of roots, the removal of which usually reveals the root form (bolded) that causes sandhi in the past sign.

	Subtype	Characteristics of Stem and Past Participle	Examples with past participle
Class I	1a	Monosyllabic, short root vowels ending in -l, -r, and -ḷ; past participle has a geminate dental stop	**ir**u "to be/exist" -> iddu **aḷ**u "to cry" -> attu
Class I	1b	Monosyllabic, long root vowel with sonorant finals; past participle simply takes -idu without sandhi	**kēḷ**u "to listen/hear" -> kēḷidu
Class I	1c	Disyllabic, short root vowel, with sonorant final; past participle simply takes -idu without sandhi	**usir**u "to breathe" -> usiridu
Class II	IIa	Long root vowel with no final consonant; past participle takes -du without the -i augment (in literary Kannada)	**kā**yu "to wait/become hot" -> kādu (literary)/kāyidu (spoken)
Class II	IIb	Final -i/e and takes -du without the -i augment; in the 3rd person neuter, the past sign is dropped (kuri does this exceptionally, despite being in Class 1d)	**ari** "to know/understand" -> aridu **tiḷi** "to be clear/know" -> tiḷidu
Class III	IIIa	Disyllabic with long root vowel, geminate, or cluster before final -u; past participle takes -idu	**kūḍu** "to meet" -> kūḍidu
Class III	IIIb	Disyllabic with a short root vowel and voiced consonant in final syllable; past participle devoices and geminates the stop without taking -idu (in literary Kannada)	**nagu** "to laugh" -> nakku (literary)/nakkidu (spoken)
Class III	IIIc	Trisyllabic with final -u; past participle takes -idu	**maḍasu** "to fold" -> maḍasidu
Class III	IIId	Monosyllabic, short root vowel with final -y, -n, -ṇ, -r, -l, and -ḷ (aḷu is exceptional), past participle forms with nasal and -du, retroflexing if the final is -ḷ	**tin**nu "to eat" -> tindu
Class IV	IVa	Short e/o in the root with -ḍu, -ru, or -su as the final syllable; past participle ending becomes -ṭṭu, -ttu, and -ccu respectively	**koḍu** "to give" -> koṭṭu **teru** "to pay" -> tettu **bisu** "to solder" -> beccu
Class IV	IVb	Short root vowels (other than e or o) with -ḍu as the final syllable; past participle is -ṭṭu	**iḍu** "to place" - iṭṭu **suḍu** "to burn" -> suṭṭu
Class V	Va	Long root vowel with final ḷ and ṇ; past participle shortens root vowel and takes a geminate dental stop or nasalized retroflex stop	**ēḷ**u "to rise/get up" -> eddu **kāṇ**u "to see/be seen" -> kaṇḍu
	Vb	Long root vowel with final l and r; past participle drops the final and takes -tu	**sōl**u "to lose" -> sōtu **kūr**u "to sit" -> kūtu
	Vc	Long root vowel without a final consonant; past participle takes -tu	**hū**vu "to bloom" -> hūtu
	Vd	Long vowel with irregular y glide; past participle shortens the final vowel and glide becomes t before du, forming a voiceless geminate dental stop	**sāy**u "to die" -> sattu **īy**u "to give/grant" -> ittu
Class VI	a	Irregular roots taru, baru, and mīyu; past participle takes a nasal with -du	**baru** -> bandu **taru** -> tandu **mī**yu -> mindu
	b	Irregular roots hōgu and āgu; past participle forms with -du but replaces -gu with -yi in the 3rd person neuter, and the converb forms with -gi	**hōgu** -> hōgi/hōyi/hōdu **āgu** -> āgi/āyi/ādu

Note that Class III exhibits a "doubled" past stem: even though the past participle of nagu ("to laugh") is nakku, sandhi has concealed the past sign and many speakers add -idu before the personal endings.

The past stems formed as indicated in the table can be used adverbially to modify other verbs (also known as a converb) and adjectivally by affix -a (ex. bare "to write" -> baredu + a -> bareda "that was written"). The adverbial participle can convey either a sequence of actions performed leading up to the finite verb or the manner in which it was performed.

ಮನೆಗೆ ಸುತ್ತಿ ಕೊಂಡು ಬಂದನು.
manege sutti koṇḍu bandanu
He circled around and came home.

Note that the word suttu ("to circle") does not have the -du past sign; the past sign is dropped in verb sequences when the past sign is visible and unchanged by sandhi. This form is called the converb.

Past and Aorist-Future
		Singular	Plural
**1st person**		-e(nu)	-evu
**2nd person**		-e	-iri
**3rd person**	masculine	-anu	-āre
**3rd person**	feminine	-aḷe	-āre
**3rd person**	neuter	-udu (future) -itu (past)	-uvu/avu

In spoken Kannada, the 1st person singlar and 3rd person masculine singular often lose their final -nu. In the former case, the -nu is dropped without further changes, while the latter's final a is lengthened. The past tense's 3rd person neuter singular, in some dialects and occasionally in literary writing, may be formed with the suffix -udu instead of -itu. This is the Old and Middle Kannada ending, and is largely archaic in Modern Kannada.

=== Negative form: finite and periphrastic ===
Negation in Kannada occurs only with verbs, and semantically negative nouns do not exist. Total negation is expressed by interrogatives before negative phrases. There are two ways of negating verbs in Kannada, generally known as niṣēdha. The first is a finite form, where the -a suffix is the negative mood sign and is followed by the personal endings of the past and literary future. Just as Kēśirāja teaches in the Śabdamaṇidarpaṇa, Sreekantaiya states that the finite negative is used in all three tenses, though it is most commonly used in the present-future. While the finite negative is presented by traditional grammars as the standard form of negation, it is primarily a literary usage..

The second is the verbal noun (bhāvavacana) followed by the negative particle illā, itself a remnant of the finite negative of ilu, a variant of alu "to be".

ಅವರು ಕೆಲಸ ಮಾಡುವುದಿಲ್ಲಾ.
avaru kelasa māḍuvudillā
They do not do work.

The periphrastic form using illā is by far more common in spoken Kannada, which sometimes affixes -allā directly to the end of verbs in lieu of using the verbal noun. In addition, there is a tense distinction in this usage: the non-past is indicated with the -uvudu form of the verbal noun followed by illā, while the past is indicated by the -lu form of the verbal noun followed by illā. Sometimes, the present negative is marked in spoken Kannada by the -utta participle followed by illā (ex. māḍuttillā). There is also a negative adjectival participle formed with the ending -ada, ex. māḍada ("that which is not done"), and an adverbial participle with -ade, ex. māḍade ("without having done").

=== Contingent future ===
The contingent future, or future of possibility (sambhāvana), conveys the sense of speculation or hope that an action occur. This form appears to be a development primarily of the modern language, appearing in no classical work, as Kittel speculates. Sreekantaiya writes that the mood sign of the contingent future is ī/yā, alternating for certain verbs; he also points out that Kittel's reproduction of this form with y eliding the final vowel of roots is "incorrect", which may reflect an older spelling. The mood sign is attached to the past adverbial participle to form the stem. It takes the ī form after participles ending in -du (or any of its sandhi-inflected variants; ex. tiḷidu + ī -> tiḷidī ) and the yā form after -i final participles (ex. māḍi + yā -> māḍiyā). Unusually, this form takes personal endings that appear variants of the present-future marked by -utta; see the table below (note that the -ī form is elided by -ē and -ā initial suffixes).

		singular number	plural number
1st person		-ēnu	-ēvu
2nd person		-īye	-īri
3rd person	masculine	-ānu	-āru
3rd person	feminine	-āḷu	-āru
3rd person	neuter	-ītu	-āvu

The contingent future appears primarily in proverbs and warnings, and otherwise not commonly used, even in literary contexts:

ಪ್ರಕಟವಾಗಿ ಹೊಗಳಬೇಡ, ಕಣ್ಣು ಬಿದ್ದೀತು.
Prakaṭavāgi hogaḷabēḍa, kaṇṇu biddītu.
Do not praise openly, the “eye” may fall.

=== Imperatives (vidhi) and prohibitives (pratiṣēdhavidhi) ===
The imperative (vidhi) in Kannada comes in several varieties, conveying certain grammatical persons as well as particular tones of exhortation. The suffixes below are attached directly to verb roots, the vast majority of which are regular:

		singular number	plural number
1st person		-uve	-ōṇa
2nd	plain	plain root	-iri
2nd	masculine	-ō	N/A
2nd	feminine	-ē	N/A
2nd	polite	-i	-iri
3rd person		-ali	-ali

There are a handful of irregular verbs in certain grammatical persons, which have their own pattern:

- In the second person singular: baru ("to bring") -> bā, taru ("to bring") -> tā, koḷḷu ("to take") -> kō (archaic outside verbal compounds), jōlu ("to swing") -> jō
- In the second person plural: baru -> banni, taru -> tanni
  - Northern Kannada variants: barri, tarri

Certain usages of other forms tend to convey the sense of a command without actually using the morphology of the imperative. For example, the verbal noun and literary future (which is identical with the former in the 3rd person) in general, tend to convey the sense of obligation; this is also true in the negative mood.

There are also certain pragmatics of using imperatives in Kannada. The polite command ending in -i tends to be seen as straightforwardly polite, whereas -iri used in the honorific plural can carry a tone of insistence, and be seen as rude in certain contexts. The "masculine" and "feminine" commands are casual in tone, and are used freely with children, animals, and close friends. The gender specificity of these commands may be unique to spoken Kannada, as this usage is not mentioned in grammatical works. In literary Kannada, the -ō and -ē commands can both convey direct commands without concern for hierarchy or politeness, and thus can also convey a certain affection between speaker and addressee, especially if they are friends or parent and child.

Prohibitive commands in Kannada combine root verbs suffixed with -a with the negative verb bēḍa (from bēḍu "to request/ask"), which receives the 2nd person endings of the imperative. There are also several negative verbs that provide additional meaning to the prohibitive. In the place of bēḍa, the negative verbs bāradu (from baru, "to come"; here "to be allowed/meet") and kūḍadu (from kūḍu, "to meet"; here "to be fit") convey admonition (i.e. "one should not"), with the latter being stronger in tone. In formal speech and announcements, the -lu verbal noun followed by the negative verb āradu (from āru, "to be able") is often used to express impossibility or prohibition.

The conditional

Another non-finite verb form in Kannada is the conditional (pakṣārtha), which conveys the sense of "if (verb)". The suffix for this form is -are, and it is attached to the past tense stem (ex. baru -> bandare, māḍu -> māḍidare). Conditional phrases (the "if-clause") in Kannada are usually followed by a clause marking the consequence in the aorist-future tense, though some may use the past tense instead.

ನೀನು ನಿಜ ಹೇಳಿದರೆ ಬದುಕಿದೆ/ಬದುಕುವೆ, ಇಲ್ಲವಾದರೆ ಕೆಟ್ಟೆ/ಕೆಡುವೆ
Nīnu nija hēḷidare badukide/badukuve, illavādare, keṭṭe/keḍuve.
If you tell the truth, I will survive, but if not, I will be ruined.

Sreekantaiya explains the use of the past tense here: "The action has not taken place, but to show certainty that it will happen, the past form has been used."

Verb derivation

Additional meanings can be derived from Kannada verb roots through the affixation of the causative suffix -isu or the periphrastic construction of the "passive" voice through the -lu verbal noun (often shortened to -l) with the verb paḍe ("to undergo/experience").

While native Kannada verb roots are made causative by the suffix -isu, nouns and Sanskrit words generally are verbalized. For example: māḍu ("to do") + -isu yields māḍisu ("to cause to do"), while pāṭha ("recitation") + -isu yields pāṭhisu ("to recite"). The "passive" voice derived through -lu and paḍe is not a morphological passive, but a periphrastically constructed one. Verbs made passive in this way cannot take objects, as in the phrase suḍal paṭṭanu ("he burned himself"), literally "he experienced burning". The voice is still active in that the verb has no morphological indication of a passive voice.

Compound verb forms

In addition to the basic tense forms, Kannada has two main compound verb forms. Continuous verb participles marked by -utta can be followed by a conjugated form of iru ("to be"). In principle, these can be conjugated in any tense or other verb form (including the future).

ನಾವು ಮಂಗಳೂರಿಗೆ ಹೋಗುತ್ತಿದ್ದೇವೆ.
Nāvu maṅgaḷūrige hōgutt'iddēve.
We are going to Mangaluru.

ಅವರು ಶಿವಮೊಗ್ಗದಿಂದ ಬರುತ್ತಿದ್ದರು.
Avaru śivamoggadinda barutt'iddaru.
They were coming from Shimoga.

The present continuous and present-future are identical in modern Kannada, though context clues can clarify the meaning. Additionally, the past stem can serve to mark the perfective aspect when followed by a conjugated form of iru ("to be").

ನಮ್ಮ ಮಗಳು ಪುಸ್ತಕ ಬರೆದಿದ್ದಾಳೆ.
Namma magaḷu pustaka bared'iddāḷe
Our daughter wrote/has written a book.

The above form can be called the present perfect, but it often has the meaning of recent rather than remote past. The use of the present perfect typically implies that the event has continuing relevance to the present context, where the simple past is taken to mark an event that began and concluded in the past.

ಅಧ್ಯಾಪಕರು ಪುಸ್ತಕಗಳನ್ನು ತರಿಸಿದ್ದರು.
Adhyāpakaru pustakagaḷannu tarisiddaru.
The teacher had ordered the books.

The past perfect, similar to the present perfect, suggests that the event began in the past but continued to be relevant up until another point in the past. The simple past here would mark the end of such a sequence. Notice also that the past stem here is the converb form (that lacks the -du of the past sign -idu).

The future continuous (ex. ಮಾಡುತ್ತಿರುವೆ māḍutt'iruve, "I'll be doing") does occur in modern speech, but the future perfect is relatively uncommon (ಮಾಡಿರುತ್ತದೆ māḍ'iruttade, "It will have done").
