= List of Karnataka literature =

This is a list of historical and modern Karnataka literature, arranged in chronological order of the historical polity or era from which the works originated. Karnataka literature originates from the Karnataka region of South India, which roughly corresponds to the modern state of Karnataka.

This list includes, but is not limited to, works written in the Sanskrit and Kannada languages. Where information is available, the author or authors of the text are listed, followed by the title of the text and the language or languages in which the text is written. Multiple works by the same author are listed separately.

== Western Ganga Dynasty (350–1000) ==
- Pūjyapāda – Sarvārthasiddhi (Sanskrit)
- Jinasena II – Ādipurāṇa (Sanskrit)
- Madhava II – Dattaka Sutrain (Sanskrit)
- Sripurusha – Gajasastra
- Shivamara II – Gajashtaka (Kannada)
- Shivamara II – Sethubandha (Prakrit)
- Hemasena or Vidya Dhananjaya – Raghavpandaviya
- Vidhibhasimha – Gadyachintamani
- Vidhibhasimha – Kshatrachudamani
- Guru Nemichandra – Gommatasara
- Chavundaraya – Chavundaraya Purana (Kannada)
- Chavundaraya – Charitrasara (Kannada)
- Chavundaraya – Trishashti Laksan Puran (Kannada)
- Nagavarma I – Chandombhudhi
- Jinasena I – Harivamsha (Sanskrit)

== Rashtrakuta Dynasty (753–982) ==
- Trivikrama – Nalachampu (Sanskrit)
- Halayudha – Kavirahasya
- Halayudha – Mritasanjivini
- Somadevasuri – Nitikavyamrita
- Mahaviracharya – Ganita-Sara-Samgraha
- Virasenacharya – Jayadhavala-Tika
- Jinasenacharya – Parsvabhyudaya Mahapurana
- Jinasenacharya – Dhavala
- Gunabhadra – Uttarapurana (Sanskrit)
- Asaga – Vardhamana Purana (Kannada)
- Amoghavarsha I – Prashottara Ratnamakike (Kannada)
- Amoghavarsha I – Kavirajamarga (Kannada)
- Sri Ponna – Bhuvanaika-Ramabhyudaya (Kannada)
- Sri Ponna – Santipurana (Kannada)
- Sri Ponna – Jinaksaramale (Kannada)
- Adikavi Pampa – Adipurana (Kannada)
- Adikavi Pampa – Vikramarjuna Vijaya (Kannada)
- Shivakotiacharya – Vaddaradhane (Kannada)

== Seuna (Yadava) Dynasty (860–1317) ==
- Kamalabhava – Santhishwarapurana (Kannada)
- Achanna – Varadhamanapurana (Kannada)
- Chundarasa of Pandharapura – Dashakumara Charite (Kannada)

== Western Chalukya Empire (973–1189) ==
- Ranna – Ajitapurana (Kannada)
- Ranna – Sahasabhimavijaya (Kannada)
- Ranna – Gadayuddha (Kannada)
- Ranna – Rannakanda (Kannada)
- Chavundaraya II – Lokopakara (Kannada)
- Chandraraja – Madanatilaka (Kannada)
- Shridharacharya – Jatakatilaka (Kannada)
- Kirtivarma – Govaidya (Kannada)
- Durgasimha – Panchatantra (Kannada)
- Nagavarma – Kavyavalokana (Kannada)
- Brahmashiva – Samayaparikshe (Kannada)
- Vadiraja – Yashodharacharitam (Sanskrit)
- Vadiraja – Parshvanatha Charitam (Sanskrit)
- Bilhana – Vikramankadeva Charitha (Sanskrit)
- Vijananeshvara – Mitakshara (Sanskrit)
- Someshwara III – Abhilashithartha Chinthamani or Manasollasa (Sanskrit)
- Someshwara III – Chandraprabhacharite (Sanskrit)
- Jagadekamalla – Sangithachudamani (Sanskrit)
- Jagaddala Somanatha – Karnataka Kalyanakaraka (Kannada)
- Karnaparya – Neminatha Purana (Kannada)
- Nayasena – Dharmamrita (Kannada)
- Brahmasiva – Samayaparikshe (Kannada)
- Shantiraja – Sukumaracharita (Kannada)
- Vritta Vilasa – Translation of Sanskrit text Dharama Parikshe (Kannada)
- Nagavarma II – Kavyavalokana (Kannada)
- Nagavarma II – Bhashabhushana (Kannada)
- Nagavarma II – Abhidana Vastukosha (Kannada)

== Hoysala Empire (950–1343) ==
- Madhvacharya – Sarvamula Granthas (Sanskrit)
- Vidyatirtha – Rudraprashnabhashya (Sanskrit)
- Nagachandra – Ramachandra Charitapurana (Kannada)
- Nagachandra – Mallinathapurana (Kannada)
- Harihara – Girija Kalyana (Kannada)
- Harihara – Basavarajadevara Ragale (Kannada)
- Raghavanka – Harischandra Kavya (Kannada)
- Raghavanka – Siddhara Chanitra (Kannada)
- Raghavanka – Veeresha Charite (Kannada)
- Raghavanka – Sharabha Charitre (Kannada)
- Raghavanka – Somanathacharita (Kannada)
- Raghavanka – Harihara Mahatwa (Kannada)
- Janna – Yashodhara Charite (Kannada)
- Janna – Ananthanatha Purana (Kannada)
- Nemichandra – Leelavati (Kannada)
- Nemichandra – Neminatha Purana (Kannada)
- Achanna – Vardhamana Purana
- Rudrabhatta – Jagannatha Vijaya (Kannada)
- Mallikarjuna – Sukti (Kannada)
- Mallikarjuna – Sudharnava (Kannada)
- Kesiraja – Shabdamanidarpana (Kannada)
- Hastimalla – Adipurana (Kannada)
- Andayya – Vardhamana Purana (Kannada)
- Andayya – Kabbigarakava (Kannada)
- Choundarasa – Abhinava Dasha Kumara Charitha (Kannada)
- Choundarasa – Nala Champu (Kannada)
- Rajaditya – Kshetraganita (Kannada)
- Rajaditya – Vyavaharaganita (Kannada)
- Rajaditya – Lilavati (Kannada)
- Ratta Kavi – Rata-Mata (Kannada)
- Bandhuvarma – Neminatha Purana (Kannada)
- Bandhuvarma – Harivamsha (Kannada)
- Mahabalakavi – Neminatha Purana (Kannada)
- Padmarasa – Dikshabodhe (Kannada)
- Hastimalla – Adipurana
- Trivikrama – Ushaharana (Sanskrit)
- Narayana Pandita – Madhwavijaya (Sanskrit)
- Narayana Pandita – Manimanjari (Sanskrit)
- Narayana Pandita – Parijataharana (Sanskrit)
- Vidyacharkarvartin II – Rukminikalyana (Sanskrit)

== Kalachuri dynasty (1164–1181), Virashaiva Saints and Vachanakaras ==
- Basavanna (known as Basaveshvara wrote the spiritual lyrics vachanas – Kannada)
- Madivala Machayya (vachanakara – Kannada)
- Madara Channayya (vachanakara – Kannada)
- Sakalesha Madarasa (vachanakara – Kannada)
- Ramanna (vachanakara – Kannada)
- Sujikayakada Ramitande (vachanakara – Kannada)
- Medara Ketayya (vachanakara – Kannada)
- Kayakada Basappa (vachanakara – Kannada)
- Virupaksha Pandita – (Chennabasavapurana – Kannada)
- Dharani Pandita – (Bijjalarayacharite – Kannada)
- Chandrasagara Varni (Bijjalarayapurana – Kannada)

== Vijayanagara Empire (1336–1646), Kannada Haridasa Sahitya ==
- Kumara Vyasa (1430 AD) (Gadugina Bharata or Karnataka Bharata KathaManjari a Kannada adaptation of Mahabharata and Airavata. His title was Rupaka Samrajya Chakravarti (Emperor of the World of Metaphors).)
- Narahri or Kumara Valmiki (1500 AD) (Torave Ramayana in Kannada & Smriti Kaustubha in Sanskrit)
- Vittalanatha (Bhagavatha) – Kannada
- Ratnakarvarni (16th century) (Bharatesha Vaibhava, Triloka Sataka, Someswara Sataka) – Kannada
- Nanjunda – Kumara Rama Charita (16th century) – Kannada
- BhimaKavi – Basavapurana(1369 AD) – Kannada
- Padmanaka – Kannada
- Kereya Padmarasa – Padmaraja Purana (1385 AD) – Kannada
- Lakkana Dandesa Shivatatwa Chintamani (1428 AD) – Kannada
- Gubbi Mallanacharya – Veerasaivamrita (1513 AD) – Kannada
- Singiraja – Kannada
- Chamarasa (Prabhulinga Leele) – Kannada
- Akalanka (16th century), Jain scholar – Kannada
- Bhattakalaka (16th century) – Kannada grammarian
- Mangaraja (1360 AD) (Khagendra-Mani-Darpana, work on poisons and antidotes) – Kannada
- Sayana (Vedartha Prakasha, Yajnatantra Sudhanidhi, Prayaschitra Sudhanidhi and Purushartha Sudhanidhi) – Sanskrit
- Madhava Vidyaranya (Parasara – Madhaviya, Sarva-darshana-samgraha) – Sanskrit
- Devanna Bhatta (Smriti Chandrika) – Sanskrit
- Gangadevi (Poet, Madhura Vijayam) – Sanskrit
- Tirumalamba Devi (Poet, Varadambika Parinayam) – Sanskrit
- Krishnadevaraya (Madalasa Charita, Satyavadu Parinaya& Rasamanjari – Sanskrit
- Ramaraja (Bakhair – Battle of Talikota – Persian??)
- Timmanna Kavi, patronised by king Krishnadevaraya, Kannada
- Kereya Padmarasa, Padmaraja Purana – Kannada
- Linganna, Keladinripavijayam – Kannada
- Unknown author, Krishnadevarayana Dinachari is a recent discovery in Kannada.
- Chatu Vithalanatha, Kannada
- Madhura, Kannada
- Salva
- Mallanarya, Veerasaivamrita – Kannada
- Lakkana Dandesa, Shivatatwa Chintamani – Kannada
- Shivagna Prasadi Mahadevayya and Halageyadeva, Shunya Sampadane – Kannada
- Kallumathada Prabhuva – Kannada
- Jakkanna – Kannada
- Maggeya Mayideva – Kannada
- Tontada Siddalingayati – Kannada

Haridasa

- Purandaradasa (1484–1564 AD) (Father of Carnatic music. Composed 475,000 songs in Kannada. His titles wereDasaShreshta Purandaropanishat, Sangitapitamaha)
- Kanakadasa (1509–1607 AD) (Padas and Keertans

RamadhyanaCharite, Haribhakthisara, Kalacharithre, Mohana Tarangini, Nalacharitre – Kannada)

- Narahari Thirtha
- Padmanabha Thirtha
- Akshobhya Thirtha
- Jayatirtha – Nyaya sudha, Tattva prakashika, Prameya deepika, Nyaya deepika Important works
- Sripadaraya of Mulbagal (1500 AD)
- Vyasatirtha (1447 – 1539 AD) – Guru of Purandaradasa, Kanakadasa and Krishnadevaraya wrote Nyayamritam, Tarkatandava, Tatparya Chandrika Important Works
- Sri Vadirajaswami

=== Later Haridasa ===
- Guru Raghavendra Swami (1600–1671 AD) the great Sage of Manthralaya.Important works
- Vijaya Dasa (1687–1755 AD)
- Mohana Dasa
- Gopala Dasa (1721–1762 AD)
- Helavanakatte Giriyamma
- Jagannatha Dasa (1728–1809 AD) (Harikathamrithasara, Uga Bhogas, Keerthanas and Tathva Suvalis– Kannada)

== Kannada literature from Mysore Kingdom, Keladi Nayaka kingdom ==
- Basappanayaka (Shivatatwa Ratnakara – History Keladi Kings)
- Linganna (Keladi Napra Vijaya– History of Keladi Kings)
- Chikkupadhyaya, Minister and teacher of His Highness Sri Chikkadevaraja Wodeyar (1670 AD) – more than 30 works in Kannada
- Tirumalaraya (1680 CE) (Chikkadevaraja Vijayam, Chikkadevaraja Vamshaavali – History of Mysore Kings)
- Govinda Vaidya (1648 CE) (Narasaraja Vijaya – History of Mysore Kings)
- Bhattakalanka Deva (1604 AD) (Karnataka Shabdaushasana on grammar)
- Sakdakshara Deva (1657 AD) (Rajshekhara Vilasa – romantic champu)
- Noorondayya (1740 AD) (Soundara Kavya)
- Nijaguna Yogi (1650 AD) (Viveka Chintamani – Shaiva work)
- Nanja Raja (1760 AD) (Shiva Bhakti Mahatmya and Hari Vamsa – Puranic works)
- Brahma Kavi (Samaya Pariksha)
- Sarvajna (1650 AD) (tripadis or vachanas pithy three lined poems in Kannada)

== Kannada literature from old Bangalore (18th century – 20th century) ==
18th-century Kannada

- Guru Nanjesh (Jayastuti)
- Ekambara Dikshit (Veerabhdra Vijaya)
- Jayaram Pande (Radha Madhava Vilasa)
- Mudduveeraswamy (1700 AD) (Vachanakara)
- Sarpabhooshana Shivayogi (1795–1839 AD) (Vachanakara)
- Mahant Desika (Vachanakara)
- Jeerage Basavalingacharya (Vachanakara)

19th-century Kannada (topics: grammar, linguistics, Jain and Virashaiva philosophy, geology, agriculture, politics)

- Siddhanti Velanada
- Subramanya Shastri
- Siddhanti Shivakumara Shastri
- Srinivasa
- Nagasharma
- Dakshinamurthy Shastri
- Padmaraja Bhramasuri
- Ramanathapuram Raguraya
- S. N. Narasimhaiah
- Doddabele Narayana Shastri – commentary on Jaimini Bharatha, Sundarakhanda, translations of Kalidasa works

20th-century Kannada

- Bidare Ashwatha Narayana shastri (Dhammapada)
- B. Puttiah (printing technology)
- Panyam Sudarashastri (a translation of Bhasa Dharma)
- S.K. Nasasimhaiya (biography of Magadi Kempe Gowda)
- Toppulu Raghavacharya (translation of commentary on Gita)
- Mahant desika (Yakshagana composition)
- Balasaraswati (first detective novel)
- Mahadevaswamy (nicknamed Abhinava Allama)
- Pt. Shivakumar Swamy
- Siddalingaswamy of Beli Matha
- Nanjundaswamy of Guruvanna Matha
- Pt. B. Shivamurty Shastri

20th-century Sanskrit Keerthanakaras

- Singeri NarasimhaShastri
- M. Lakshminarasimha Shastri
- Varada Desikachar
- Jaggu Vakulabhushana
- Rariapalli Anantha Krishna Sharma
- Motaganahalli Subramanya Shastri

20th-century harikathe dasaru

- Gururajulu Naidu
- Sant Keshava Das
- Bhadragiri Achuth Das
- Malur Sonnappa
- Muiratnam Mudaliar

== Modern Kannada poets, scholars and writers ==
Sahitya Academy Awardees

- 1955 Kuvempu (K. V. Puttappa) Sri Ramayana Darsanam (epic)
- 1956 R. S. Mugali Kannada Sahitya Charitre (history of literature)
- 1958 D. R. Bendre Aralu-Maralu (poetry)
- 1959 K. Shivaram Karanth Yakshagana Bayalata (a treatise on folk-drama)
- 1960 'Vinayaka' (V. K. Gokak) Dyava-Prithvi (poetry)
- 1961 A. R. Krishnashastry Bengali Kadambarikara Bankim Chandra (a critical study)
- 1962 Devudu Narasimha Sastri Mahakshatriya (novel)
- 1964 B. Puttaswamayya Kranti-Kalyana (novel)
- 1965 S. V. Ranganna Ranga Binnapa (philosophical reflections)
- 1966 P. T. Narasimhachar Hamsa Damayanti Mattu Itara Rupakagalu (musical plays)
- 1967 D. V. Gundappa Shrimad Bhagavadgita Tatparya Athava Jivanandharmayoga (philosophical expositions)
- 1968 'Srinivasa' (Masti Venkatesha Iyengar) Sannakathegalu (12–13) (short stories)
- 1969 H. Tipperudraswamy Karnataka Samskriti Sameekshe (cultural study)
- 1970 S. B. Joshi Karnataka Samskritiya Poorva Peethike (cultural study)
- 1971 Adya Rangacharya Kalidasa (literary criticism)
- 1972 S. S. Bhoosnurmath Shoonyasampadaneya Paramarshe (commentary)
- 1973 V. Sitaramiah Aralu Baralu (poetry)
- 1974 Gopalakrishna Adiga Vardhamaana (poetry)
- 1975 S. L. Bhyrappa Daatu (novel)
- 1975 L. Gundappa Translations from Tamil, Sanskrit to Kannada
- 1976 M. Shivaram Mana Manthana (psychiatric studies)
- 1977 K. S. Narasimhaswamy Tereda Baagilu (poetry)
- 1978 B. G. L. Swamy Hasuru Honnu (travelogue)
- 1979 A. N. Murthy Rao Chitragalu Patragalu
- 1980 Gorur Ramaswamy Iyengar Americadalli Goruru (travelogue)
- 1981 Chennaveera Kanavi Jeewa Dhwani (poetry)
- 1982 Chanduranga Vyshakha (novel)
- 1983 Yashwant Chittal Katheyaadalu Hudugi (short stories)
- 1984 G. S. Shivarudrappa Kavyartha Chintana (literary criticism)
- 1985 T. R. Subba Rao Durgaasthamaana (novel)
- 1986 Vyasaraya Ballal Bandaaya (novel)
- 1987 K.P. Poornachandra Tejaswi Chidambara Rahasya (novel)
- 1988 Shankar Mokashi Punekar Avadheshwari (novel)
- 1989 H. M. Nayak Samprati (belles lettres)
- 1990 Devanur Mahadeva Kusuma Bale (novel)
- 1991 Chandrashekhara Kambara Sirisampige (play)
- 1992 Subbanna Ekkundi Bakulada Hoovugalu (poetry)
- 1993 P. Lankesh Kallu Karaguva Samaya (short stories)
- 1994 Girish Raghunath Karnad Tale Danda (play)
- 1995 Kirtinath Kurtkoti Uriya Nalage (criticism)
- 1996 G. S. Amur Bhuvanada Bhagya (literary criticism)
- 1997 M. Chidananda Murthy Hosatu Hosatu (criticism)
- 1998 B.C. Ramchandra Sharma Sapthapadi (poetry)
- 1999 D. R. Nagaraj Sahitya Kathana (essays)
- 2000 Shantinath Kuberappa Desai Om Namo (novel)
- 2001 L. S. Sheshagiri Rao English Sahitya Charitre (literary history)
- 2002 Sujana (S. Narayana Shetty) Yugasandhya (epic)
- 2003 K. V. Subbanna Kaviraja Marga Mattu Kannada, Jagattu (essays)
- 2004 Geetha Nagabhushana Baduku (novel)
- 2005 Raghavendra Patil Teru (novel)

Kendra Sahitya Academy Awardees (translation)

- 2005 Dr. Panchakshari Hiremath, Urdu to Kannada
- Saraswati Samman Awardee
- S. L. Bhyrappa

Other eminent writers

- Panje Mangesh Rao
- De. Javare Gowda
- Annadanayya Puranik – Vachanas, Law, Shiva Sharana literature
- Siddayya Puranik – Vachanas, Shiva Sharana literature
- Chandrika Puranik – Shiva Sharana literature
- Udaya Shankar Puranik – science and technology, columnist
- Haldoderi Sudhindra – columnist
- Pandit Kallinath Shastri Puranik – 12 Puranas and Ayurveda
- Basavaraj Puranik – Shiva Sharana literature
- Samethanahalli Rama Rao (Raasa)
- Anupama Niranjana
- B. M. Srikanthaiah (B. M. Sri)
- Dr. A. N. Krishna Rao (Anakru)
- G. P. Rajarathnam
- G. B. Joshi (JadaBharata)
- M Govinda Pai
- M. V. Seetaramiah
- Nisar Ahmed K. S.
- P. Lankesh
- Dr. Panchakshari Hiremath
- SAADHANE-RajguruGuruswamiKalikeri (Poetry, research, legends, biographies and lyrics)
- S. V. Parameshwara Bhatta
- T. P. Kailasam – drama
- Tha. Ra. Subbarao
- Thee. Nam. Shree
- R. K. Narayan, author
- R. K. Laxman, cartoonist & humorist
- Kamala Markhandaya
- Triveni (Sharapanjara), novelist
- G. P. Rajaratnam (Ratnana Padagalu)
- Beechi – humorist
- Dr M.Shivaram, Rashi – humorist
- T. Sunandamma – humorist
- H. L. Nage Gowda – folklorist
- Go Ru Chennabsappa (Go Ru Cha) – Janapada Saahithya & Sharana Saahithya
- Anakaru – novelist
- M. Ramamurthy
- K. V. Iyer
- Devudu
- Niranjana
- Na. Kasturi
- Navaratna Rama Rao
- T. T. Sharma – journalism
- VeeraKesari
- Siddavanahalli Krishna Sharma
- Hariharapriya
- R. Kalyanamma
- Tirumale Rajamma
- Ambabai
- H. V. Savitramma
- H. S. Parvathi
- Chi. Na. Mangala
- H. R. Indira
- M. K. Indira
- P. V. Acharya Poet, Editor and writer
- M. V. Kanakamma
- Nirupama
- N. Pankaja
- Usha Navaratna Ram
- Kakolu Saroja Rao
- Anupama Niranjana
- Vi. Seetharamiah, poet, critic
- Basavaraja Kattimani
- Nanjanagudu Tirumalamba (author)
- Sundar V. Nadkarni, fiction writer and poet
- Ta. Raa.Subba Rao, novelist
- Veenaa Shantheshvara, short story writer
- Vaidehi, short story writer
- Sumangala, short story writer
- Dr K. R. Sandhya Reddy, poet, story writer, folk literature
- T. K. Venkatesh Prabhu – novelist & poet
- A. N. Prahlada Rao Kannada crossword writer
- Pratibha Nandakumar, poet
- D. R. Nagraj, critic
- K. V. Narayana, literary critic and linguist
- B. C. Ramachandra Sharma, poet and fictionist
- D.V.Guruprasad, Former police officer, columnist and writer.
- Shanhinatha Desai, novelist, story writer
- Kum. Veerabhadrappa, novelist, story writer
- Gowri Lankesh, columnist
- Vishweswara Bhat, columnist
- Abdul Raheem Teekay, Writer
- Ravi Hanj, columnist
- B. V. Veerabhadrappa, columnist
- Dr. N. Someswara, health writer
- N. Narasimhaiah – detective novelist
- A. N. Murthy Rao
- Dr. S. R. Ramaswamy, journalist
- Ba. Na. Sundara Rao, author and journalist
- Shivarudraprasad, poet and columnist

Literature originating from Christian missionaries

- Rev. John Garet (translated Bible, Bhagavadgita, Panchatantra, Shabda Manidarpana to Kannada)
- Daniel Sanderson (translated Jaimini Bharata to English)
- Thomas Hodson
- Ellis Robert
- Rev. B. L Rice
- Edward Peter Rice

== See also ==
- Kannada language
- Kannada literature
- Karnataka
- Jnanpith Award
