= Chandrashekhar Patil =

Indian Kannada language poet (1939–2022)

- Born: 18 June 1939; Hattimattur, Haveri, British Raj
- Died: 10 January 2022 (aged 82); Bangalore, Karnataka, India
- Education: MA in linguistics
- Alma mater: Central Institute of English and Foreign Languages (CIEFL), University of Leeds
- Occupations: Writer, public intellectual, professor
- Notable work: Gandhi Smarane
- Movement: Bandaya movement

Chandrashekar Patil (18 June 1939 – 10 January 2022), popularly known as Champa, was an Indian poet, playwright and public intellectual writing in Kannada. Patil was a recipient of the Karnataka Sahitya Akademi Award for Poetry in 1989 and the Karnataka state government's Pampa Award in 2009. Patil had served as the president of the Kannada Sahitya Parishat, a Kannada language literary organization.

== Life and career ==
Champa was the editor of the literary journal Sankramana started with two of his friends Siddalinga Pattanashetti and Giraddi Govindaraj in 1964. He was known for leading many social and literary movements such as Gokak agitation, Bandaya movement, anti-Emergency agitation, agitation for the implementation of Mandal report, Farmer's movement amongst others.

After retiring as professor of English from Karnatak University, Patil served as the President of Kannada Sahitya Parishat and as the Chairman of Kannada Development Authority. Patil was a recipient of the Karnataka Sahitya Akademi Award for Poetry in 1989 and the Karnataka state government's Pampa Award in 2009.

In addition to Kannada language, Patil also wrote in English. An anthology of his poems titled, At the other end, was published in 1983. The anthology included both poems written originally in English and his own poems translated from Kannada.

Patil was a proponent of Kannada language as a medium of instruction in the state's government schools and had spoken out in 2019 against the then state government's move to introduce English as the medium of instruction in the state's government schools. Earlier, in 2015, protesting the assassination of his friend and Vachana scholar M. M. Kalburgi, he returned his Pampa Award, the highest literary honour of the government of Karnataka.

Patil died in Bangalore on 10 January 2022, at the age of 83.

== Works ==
=== Poetry ===
- Banuli (1960)
- Madhyabindu
- 19 Kavanagalu
- Gandhi smarane
- Hoovu Hennu Taare
- Shalmala Nanna Shalmala
- Ardha Satyada Hudugi (1989; Karnataka Sahitya Akademi Award for Poetry)
- Gundammana Gazhalagal

=== Plays ===
- Kodegalu
- Appa (1969)
- Gurtinavaru (1971)
- Tingara Buddanna (1971)
- Kattala Ratri
- Gokarnada Goudasani (1974)
- Nalakaviya Mastabhisheka (1979)
- Jagadamebeya Beedinataka

=== Essays ===
- Nanna Haadina Halla
- Anarogyave Bhagya
- Champadakiya
- Nanu Kandante Nanage Kandashtu
- Aksharalokada Aakritigalu
- Champa Nota
- Champa Column
- Nanna Guru Gokak
- Kritikendritha
- Nitya Varthamana
- Kannada Kannada Barri Namma Sangada
