= K. S. Bhagawan =

Indian writer, rationalist, critic and scholar (born 1945)

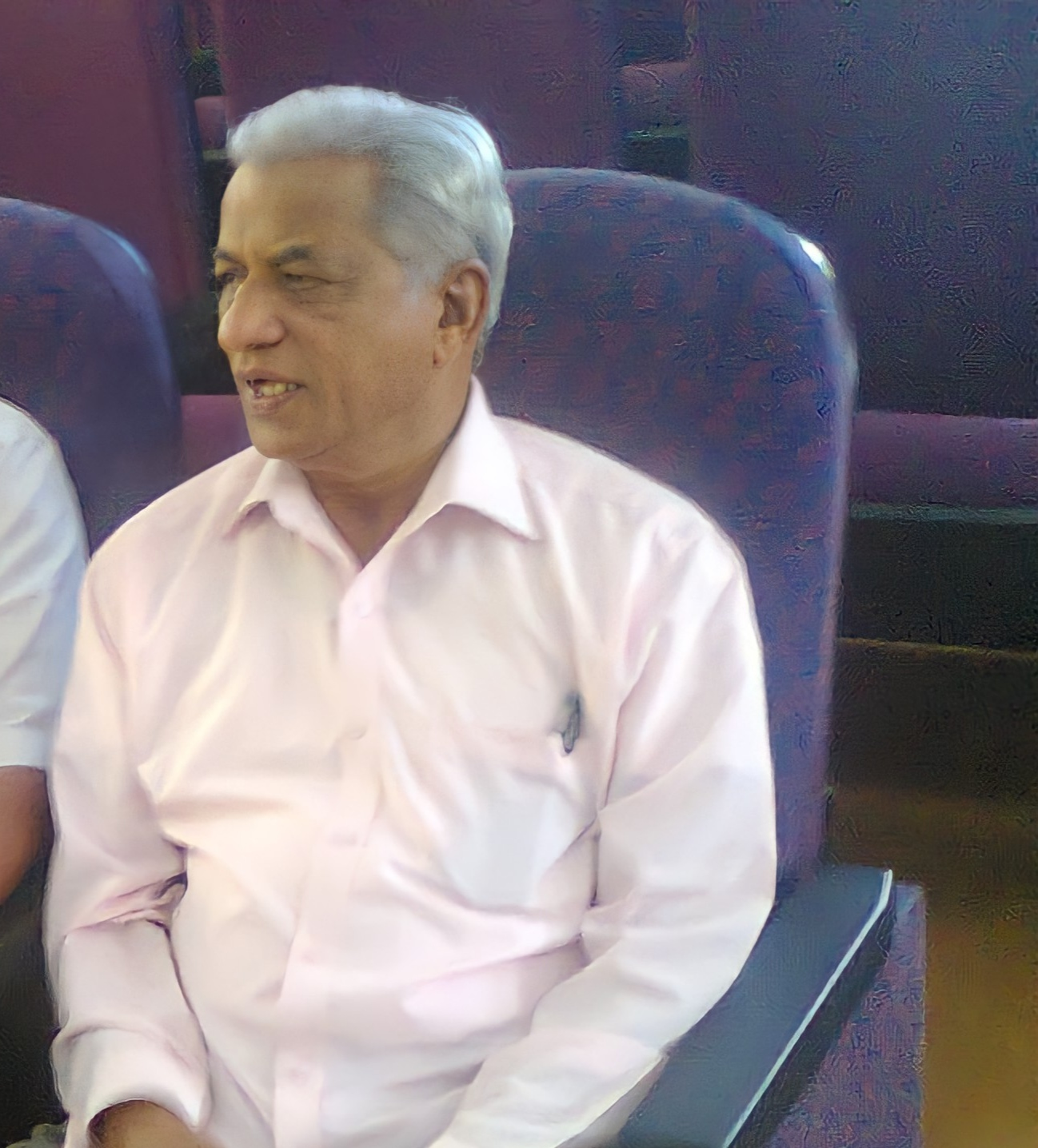
- Prof. Bhagawan at an event in Mysore
- Born: 14 July 1945 (age 81); Kalahalli, Kingdom of Mysore (now in Karnataka), British Raj (now India)
- Education: MA, D.Litt
- Alma mater: University of Mysore
- Occupations: Writer, professor, translator
- Notable work: · Shankaracharya mattu Pratigamitana (ಶಂಕರಾಚಾರ್ಯ ಮತ್ತು ಪ್ರತಿಗಾಮಿತನ) · Kuvempu Yuga (ಕುವೆಂಪು ಯುಗ)
- Movement: Bandaya movement
- Children: 2

Kallahalli Sannegowda Bhagawan (born 14 July 1945), known as Prof. K. S. Bhagawan, is an Indian Kannada writer, rationalist, translator, critic, scholar and retired professor. In addition to his works on Hinduism, Indian culture and history, he has translated the works of William Shakespeare including Julius Caesar and Hamlet. He is a recipient of many awards including the Rajyotsava Award, Kuvempu Award and the Lokayata Award.

== Career ==
Bhagawan acquired a post-graduate degree in English language from University of Mysore. As a professor, he taught English at Maharaja's College in Mysore. At the same time, he worked as a writer and translator. In 1982, his work Shankaracharya and Reactionary Philosophy (original title: ಶಂಕರಾಚಾರ್ಯ ಮತ್ತು ಪ್ರತಿಗಾಮಿತನ), a collection of essays, on how Adi Shankara, an 8th-century Hindu theologian, advocated the caste system strongly, destroyed Buddhist viharas and was against education for women, shudras and dalits, was published. It was met with criticism from right-wing Hindu groups who issued threats to his life. His other books in Kannada include Badalaavane, Antarya and Kuvempu Yuga. As a translator, he translated popular works of William Shakespeare to Kannada. It includes Merchant of Venice as Venisina Vartaka, and others such as Julius Caesar, Hamlet and Othello..

Bhagawan was chosen for the Karnataka Sahitya Academy Award for Lifetime Achievement for the year 2013.

== Controversies ==
At an event in Mysore on 15 February 2015, Bhagawan said that he would burn certain pages of the Hindu scripture Bhagavad Gita. Police also filed FIR against him for "hurting" religious sentiments. He said that verse 32 and 33 in chapter 9 of the scripture describes women, vaishyas and shudras as "sinners" [paapayonaha].

Following the murder of another Kannada writer and rationalist M. M. Kalburgi, a Bajrang Dal activist and rowdysheeter from Bantawala threatened that Bhagawan would be the next target for "mock[ing] Hinduism", with the arrest of the activist, the security at Bhagwan's residence was tightened.

== Selected bibliography ==
=== In Kannada ===
- ಶಂಕರಾಚಾರ್ಯ ಮತ್ತು ಪ್ರತಿಗಾಮಿತನ (1982)
- ಬದಲಾವಣೆ (1982)
- ಅಂತರ್ಯ (1978)
- ಕುವೆಂಪು ಯುಗ (1990)
- ಅನನ್ಯತೆ
- ಭಾಷೆ ಮತ್ತು ಸಂಸ್ಕೃತಿ
- ಇತಿಹಾಸದ ಪಾಠಗಳು
- ಗಾಂಧಿಯನ್ನು ಗೋಡ್ಸೆ ಯಾಕೆ ಕೊಂದ

=== Translations ===
- Hindu Saamrajyashahiya Itihasa

(translation of Swami Dharma Theertha's History of Hindu Imperialism)

Shakespeare's plays:

- Julius Caesar (1975, translation of Julius Caesar)
- Nimmishta (1996, translation of As You Like It)
- Venisina Vartaka (1995, translation of The Merchant of Venice)
- Othello (1997, translation of Othello)
- Hamlet (1998, translation of Hamlet)

=== In English ===
- Violence in Hinduism

== Awards ==
- Kavyanand Award (1982)
- Kuvempu Prize (1985)
- Rajyotsava Prashasti (1999)
- Naada Chethana Award (2003)
- Poet-laureate Kuvempu Birth centenary Award (2004)
- Karnataka Nataka Academy Awards (2007)
- Kuvempu Award (2011)
- Shoonya Peetha Prashasthi (2011)
- Sahitya Kalaratna Award (2011)
- Karnataka Sahithya Academy Award (2013)
- Lokayata Award (2014)
- Karnataka Kranthirathna Award (2015)
