= Karnataka Sahitya Academy Award for Poetry =

The Karnataka Sahitya Akademi Award for Poetry is an annual award given by the Karnataka Sahitya Academy recognizing the best poetry of the year written in Kannada language and published in India.

== Winners ==
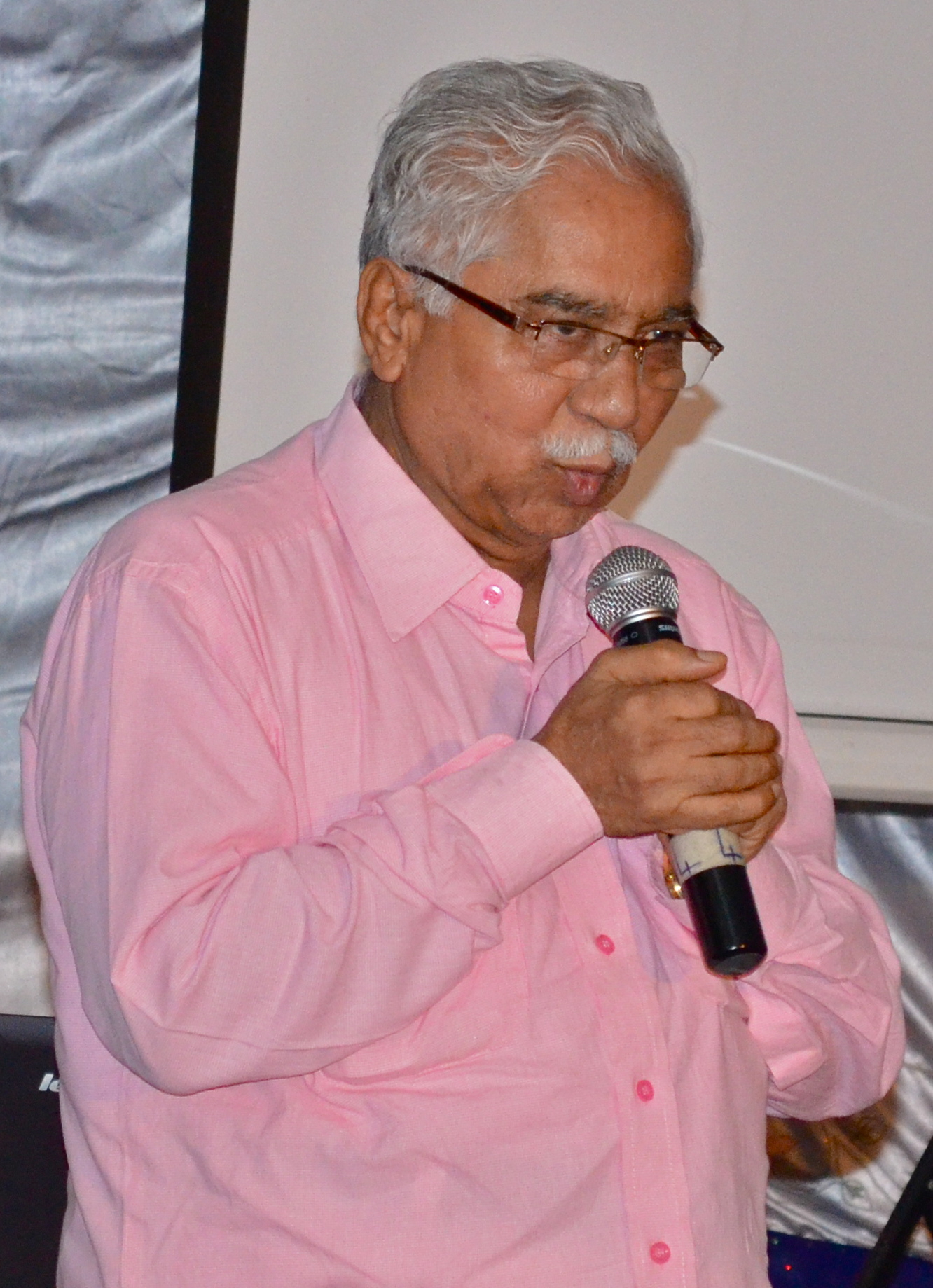
Chandrashekhara Kambara

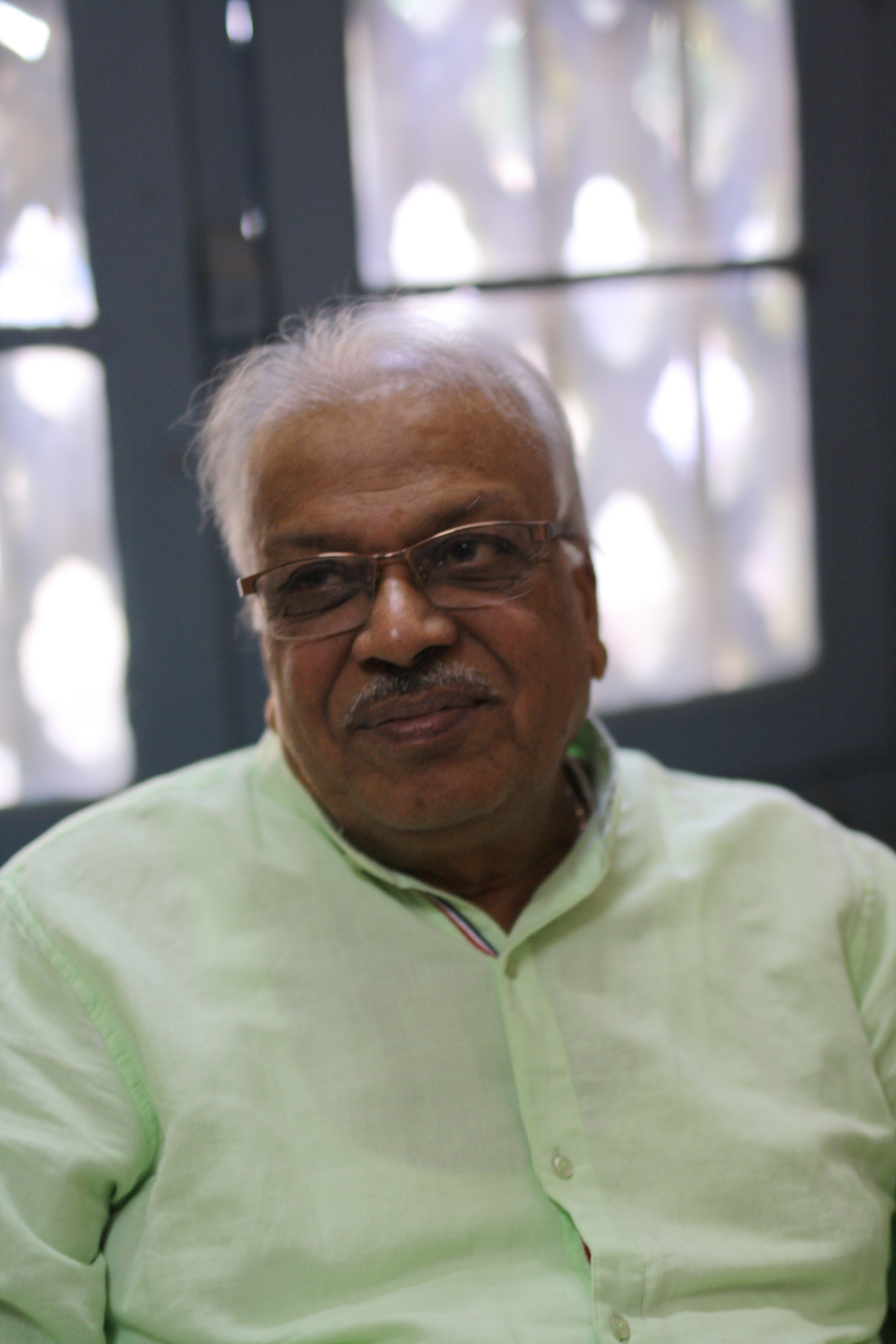
H.S.Venkatesha Murthy

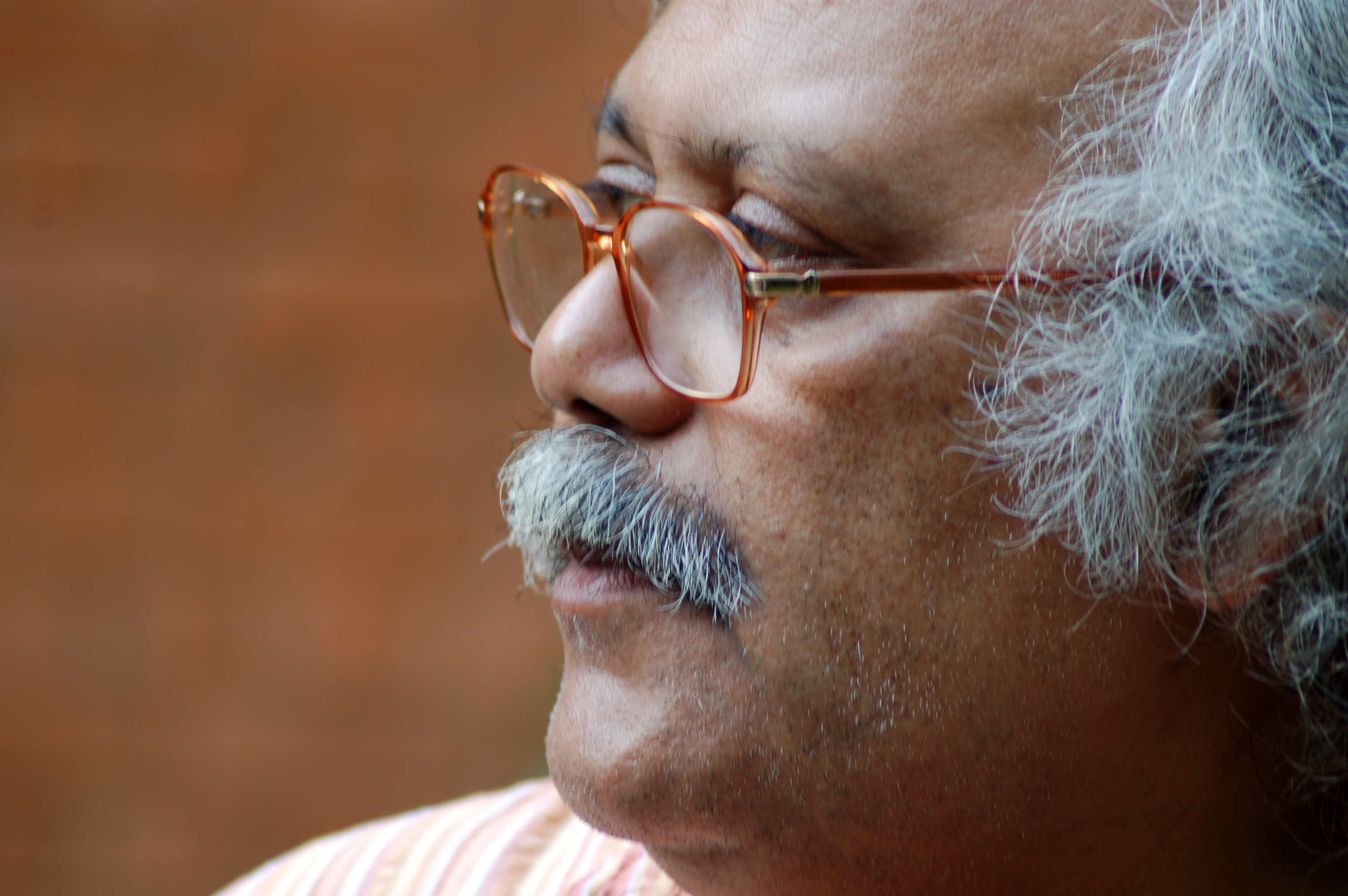
H.S.Shivaprakash

Year	Work	Poet	Refs.
1963–65	Nela Mugilu	Chennaveera Kanavi	
1963–65	Sumana Saurabha	M. Akbar Ali	
1966	Jengooda	R. C. Bhusnur Mutt	
1966	Mannina Haadu	Srikrishna Alanahalli	
1967	Chandraveethi	S. V. Parameshwara Bhatta	
1967	Pratibimba	B. A. Sanadi	
1968	Chandrakhanda Mattu Kelavu Sanna Kaavyagalu	Sediyapu Krishna Bhatta	
1968	Shruthaashrutha	Simpi Linganna	
1969	Geeta Gowrava	D. S. Karki	
1970	Thakaraarinavaru	Chandrashekhara Kambara	
1971	Shakuntala	Samatenahalli Ramaraya	
1971	Ganda Hendira Jagala Gandha Teedidhaanga	Somashekhar Imrapur	
1972	Illaddu	Jayasudarshana	
1972	Kannu Naalage Kadalu	Doddarange Gowda	
1973	Kari Tali Maanavana Jeepada Kaavya	Chennanna Valikar	
1974	Rangadindondishtu Doora	Jayant Kaikini	
1974	Garimudurida Hakkigalu	Venugopala	
1975	Mathsyagandhi	S. R. Ekkundi	
1976	Gandhi Smarane	Chandrashekhar Patil	
1977	Sindabadana Aathmakathe	H. S. Venkateshamurthy	
1978	Dinakarana Chowpadi	Dinakara Desai	
1979	No Award	—N/a	
1980	Aathma Bharatha	Aravind Nadakarni	
1981	Lilly Puttiya Hambala	B. R. Lakshman Rao	
1982	Anaamika Anglaru	K. S. Nissar Ahmed	
1983	Malebidda Neladalli	H. S. Shivaprakash	
1984	Nela Hidiyuva Modalu	H. S. Bheemanagowdar	
1985	Harigolu	H. S. Venkateshamurthy	
1986	No award	—N/a	
1987	Naa Baruttene Kelu	Savita Nagabhushan	
1988	Ammana Gudda	C. Sarvamangala	
1989	Ardha Satyada Hudugi	Chandrashekhar Patil	
1990	Nelada Haadu	S. Usha	
1991	Bakulada Hoovugalu	S. R. Ekkundi	
1992	Vishwavidyaanilayada Vaachanaalayadolage	Ashok Shettar	
1993	Avaledeya Jangama	S. G. Siddharamaiah	
1994	Thaanaanthara	L. Basavaraju	
1995	Suryajala	H. S. Shivaprakash	
1996	Neevu Kaanire Neevu Kaanire	H. S. Mukthayakka	
1997	Pangia	G. K. Ravindra Kumar	
1998	Kavadeyaata	Pratibha Nandakumar	
1999	Koodikonda Saalu	Desh Kulkarni	
2000	Marujevani	S. G. Siddharamaiah	
2001	Ganeya Naada	Shankar Katgi	
2002	Ihada Swara	Lalitha Siddhabasavaiah	
2003	Idalla Idalla	N. Mogasaale	
2004	Eevuriva Dina	Dharanidevi Malagatti	
2005	Bhooyigandha	G. P. Basavaraju	
2006	Chitrada Bennu	N. K. Hanumanthaiah	
2007	Odeyalaarada Pratime	Basavaraj Okkunda	
2009	Lohada Kannu	H. L. Pushpa	
2010	Nelada KaruNeya Dani	Veeranna Madivalara	
2011	Bhoomi Tirugiva Shabdha	Channappa Angadi	
2013	Ellara Beralalloo Antikonda Dhukhave	Subbu Holeyar	
2015		Satyamangala Mahadeva	
2019	Panchavarnada Hamsa	Satyamangala Mahadeva	
2020	Karunyada Mohaka Navilugale	Ranganatha Aranakatte	
2024	Chalisuttive Chukkigalu	Bharati Devi P.	

== See also ==
- List of poetry awards
- Indian poetry
