= Bandaya movement =

Literary movement in Kannada

The Bandaya movement is a progressive literary movement in Kannada started by D. R. Nagaraj and Shudra Shrinivas in 1974. It promoted socially-committed literature and sought to make poetry a weapon against social and economic injustice. "Let poetry be a sword! The dear friend who responds to the pain of people!" ("Khadgavaagali kavya! Janara novige midiva pranamitra!"), was the slogan for the movement coined by D.R. Nagaraj.

Prominent Kannada writers who identified themselves with the movement are Siddalingaiah, Chandrashekhar Patil, Chennanna Valikar, Kalegowda Nagavar, Poornachandra Tejaswi, H.S. Shivaprakash, B.T. Lalitha Naik, Kum. Veerabhadrappa, Baraguru Ramachandrappa, Prahlad Betageri, Allama Prabhu Bettadur, Geetha Nagabhushan, K. S. Bhagwan, Shantarasa, Mallika Ghanti, Shashikala Veeriah Swamy, Banjagere Jayaprakash, Gangadhar Mudaliar, Gudihalli Nagaraj, Ramzan Darga, (late) Sugayya.S. Hiremath, Sukanya Maruti, K. Sharifa, Banu Mushtaq, Dr Anupama, Nemichandra, Ki.Ram. Nagaraj, Dr.Rajashekhar Hatagundi, L. Hanumanthaiah, Bolbandeppa, (late) Linganna Satyampet, Satyanand Patrot, Basavaraj Sabarad, Sarjoo Katkar, Anand Zunjarwad, Jambanna Amarachinta, Gavisiddha Bellary, Suryakanth Gunakimath, Kamaraj, L.N. Mukundraj, H.L. Pushpa, R.G. Halli Nagaraj and Satish Kulkarni.
