= Manchanabele =

- village
- Location in Karnataka, India Manchanabele (India)
- Coordinates: 12.86702°N 77.33445°E
- Country: India
- State: Karnataka
- Taluks: Magadi

Languages
  - Official: Kannada
- Time zone: UTC+5:30 (IST)
- Nearest city: Bangalore, Ramanagara

Manchinabele is a village in Magadi taluk in Ramanagara District. It has a population of 1098 according to 2011 census. It is 21 km from Magadi, 22 km from Ramanagara and 14 km from Bidadi.

== Manchanabele dam ==
Manchanabele dam is nearby to the place, across the river Arkavathy. It is a trekking location. It provides water to Magadi town, Kayaking also conducted here. Species of Water Snakes are also visible However, the reservoir bed is a death trap with sudden fault-lines, large boulders as well as deep slush. More than 200 people have lost their lives between 2006 and 2011. It is very dangerous to get into the waters in this reservoir even if one is a good swimmer. The dam backwaters can also be accessed via Dabbaguli village or via Magadi road where few adventure resorts are located. The Dodda Alada Mara and Savanadurga are other tourist attractions in the circuit. The dam can be reached by direct buses from K. R. Market(Route nos. 227M, 227VA, 227VC, 242VA, 242W).

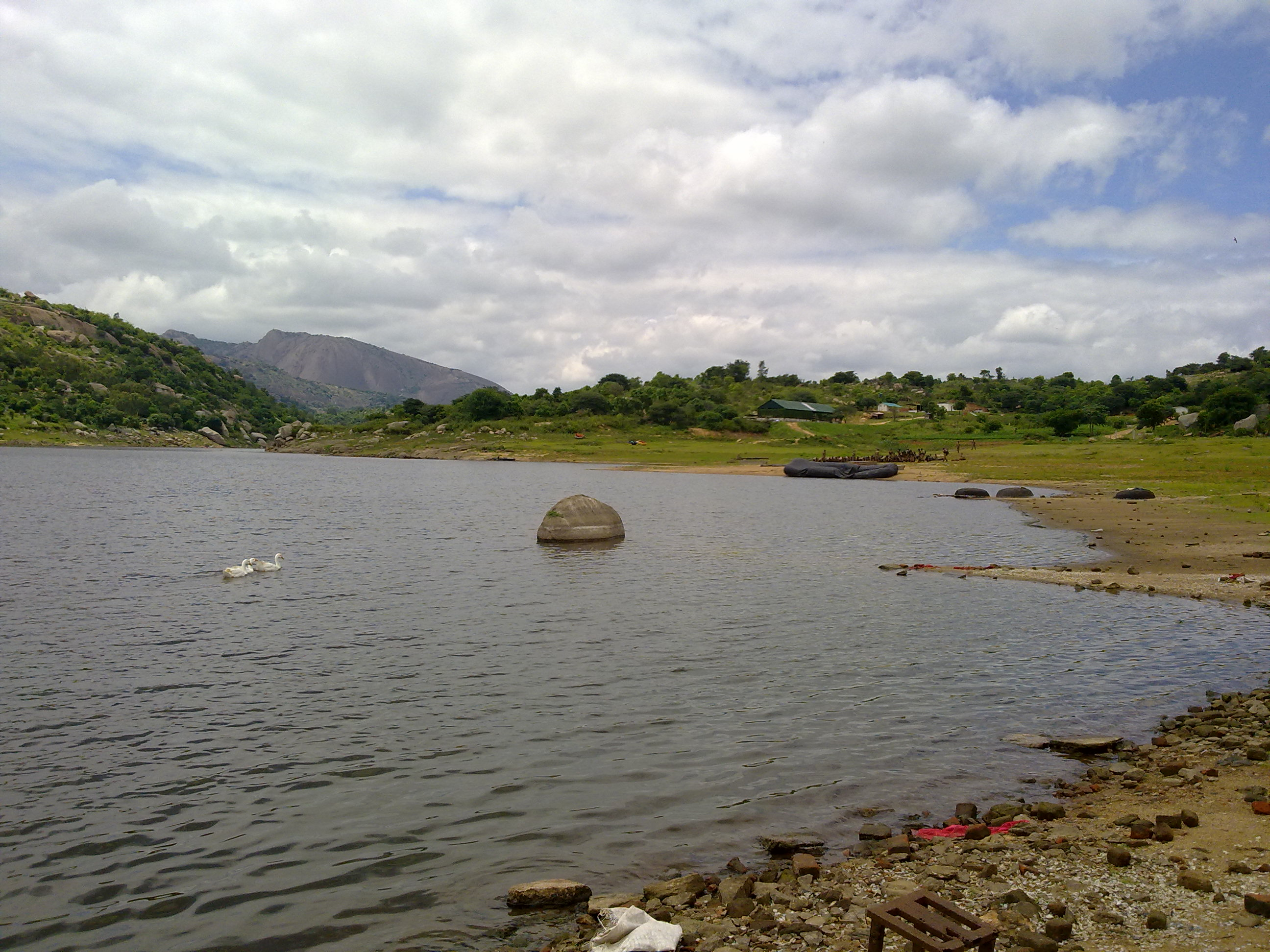
Savandurga visible from Manchanabele reservoir

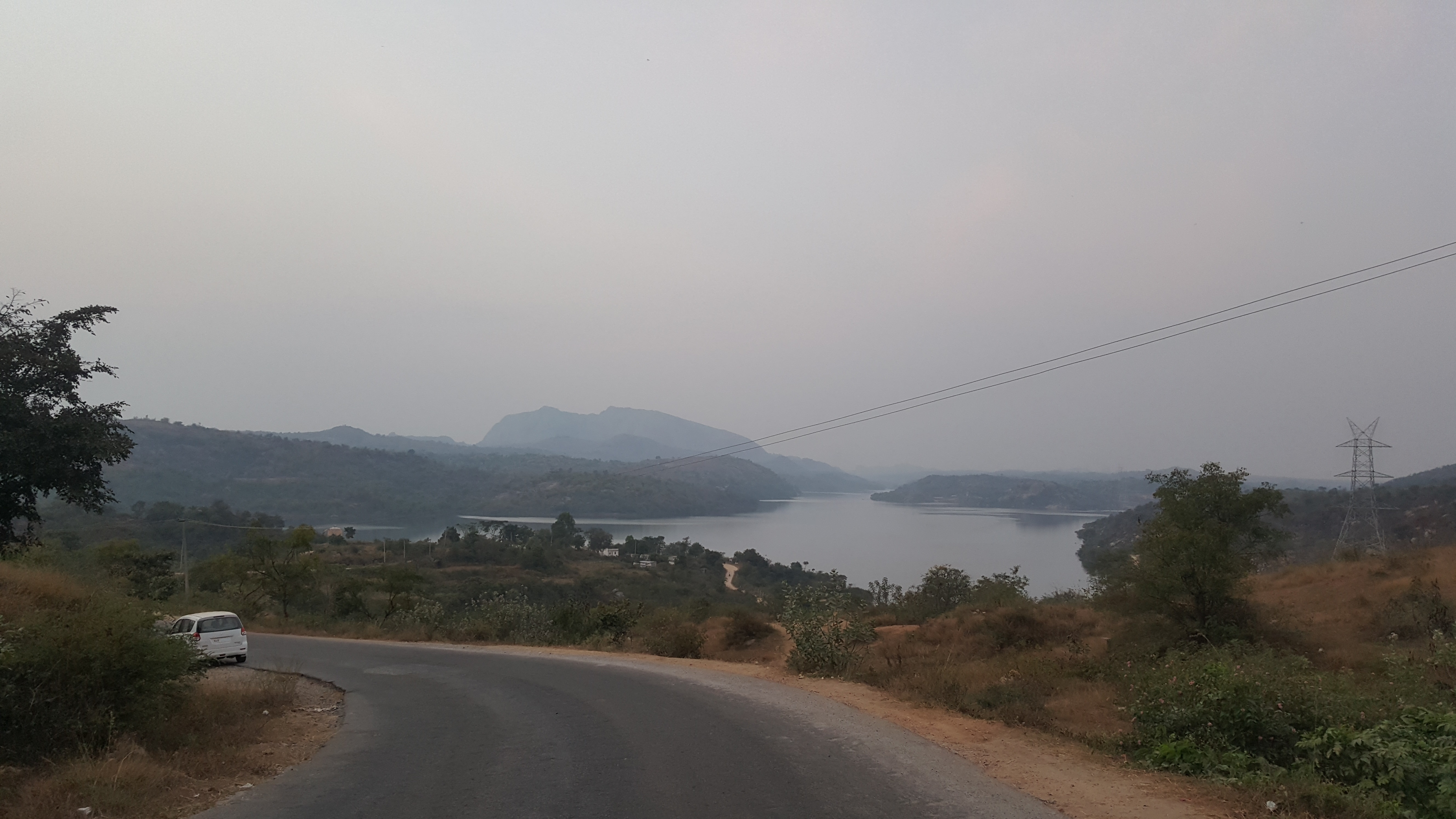
View of Manchanbele reservoir, Magadi, Ramanagara

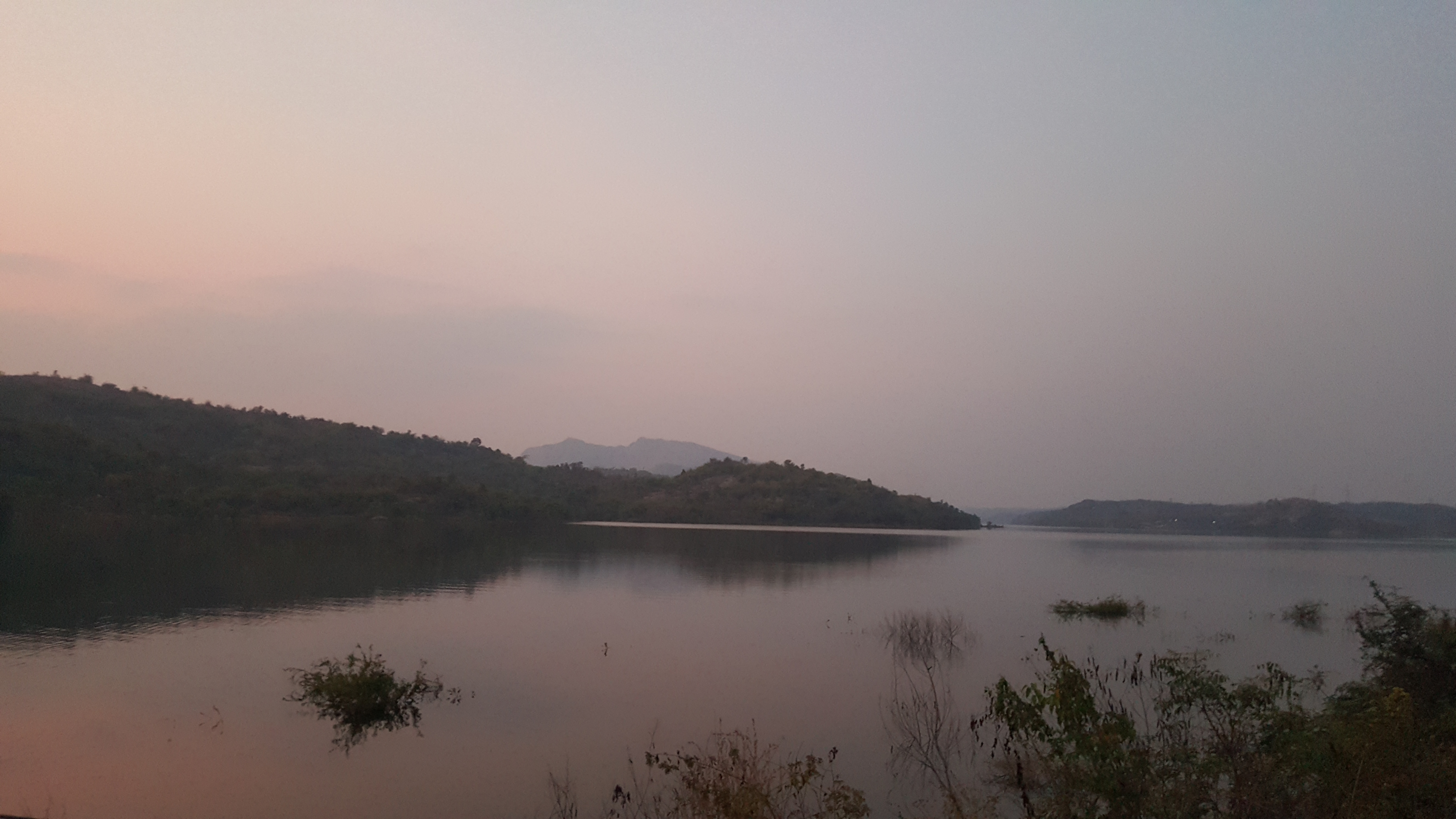
View of Manchanbele reservoir, Magadi, Ramanagara

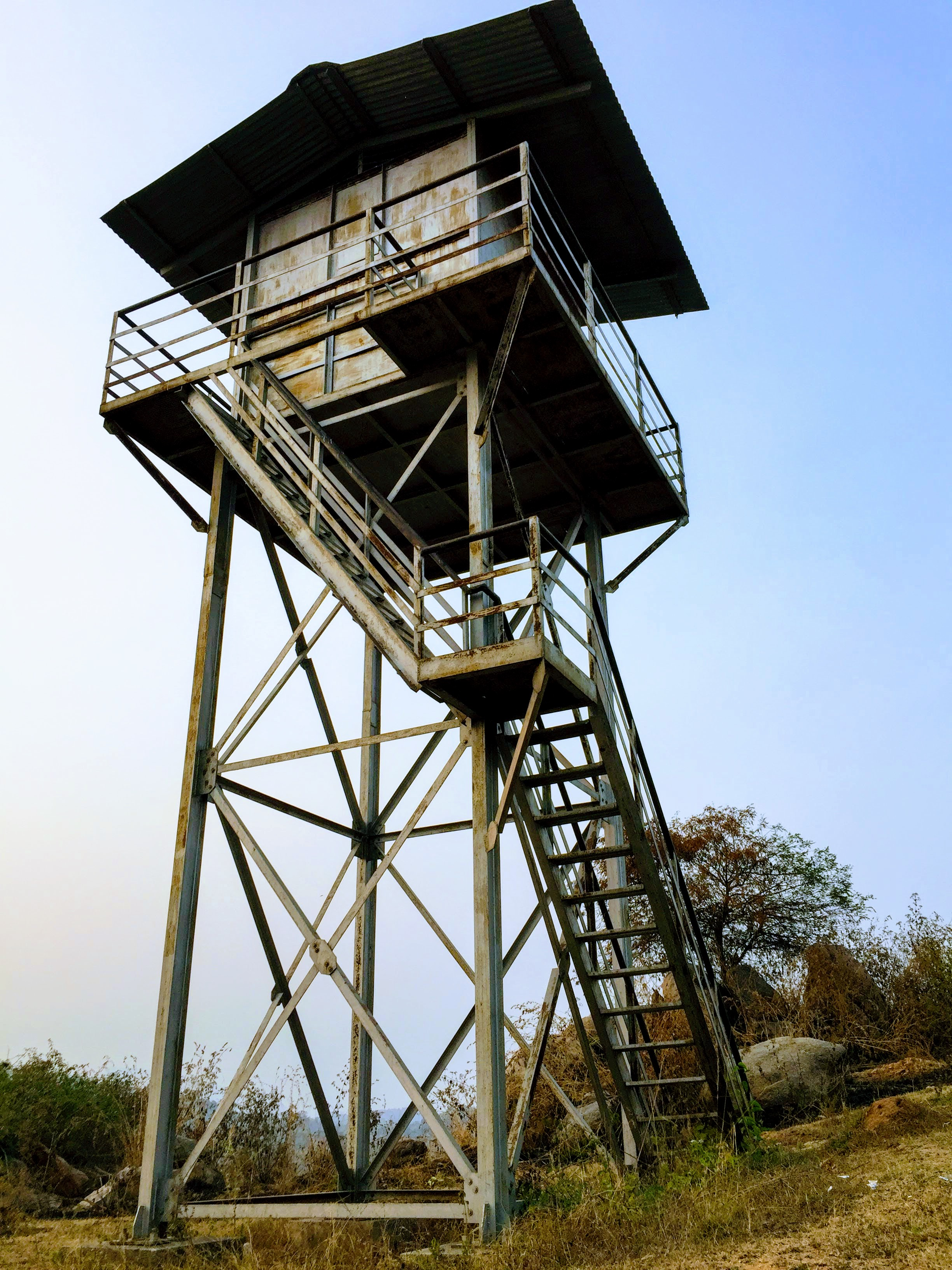
Manchanabele dam observation tower

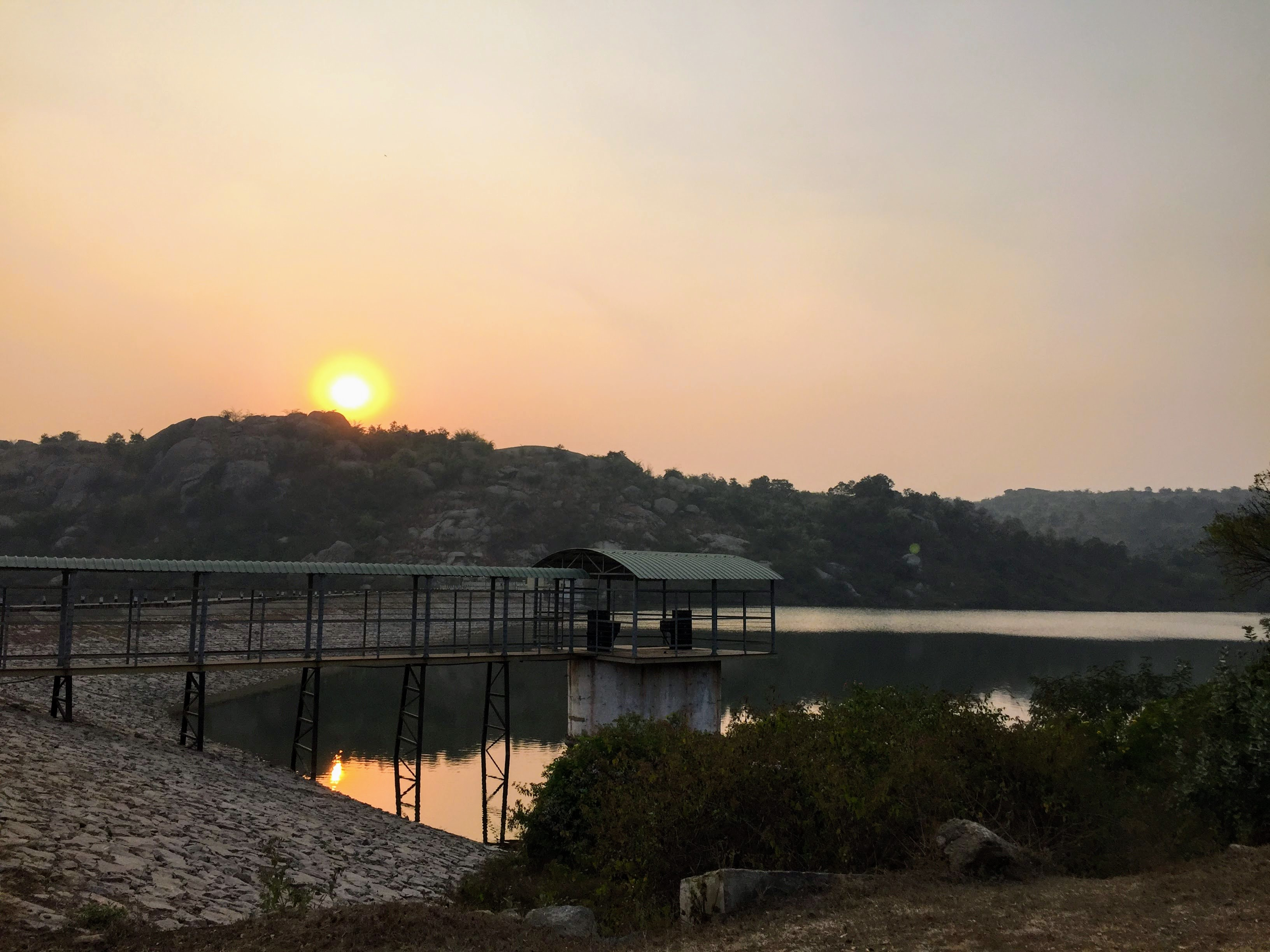
Manchanabele dam reservoir

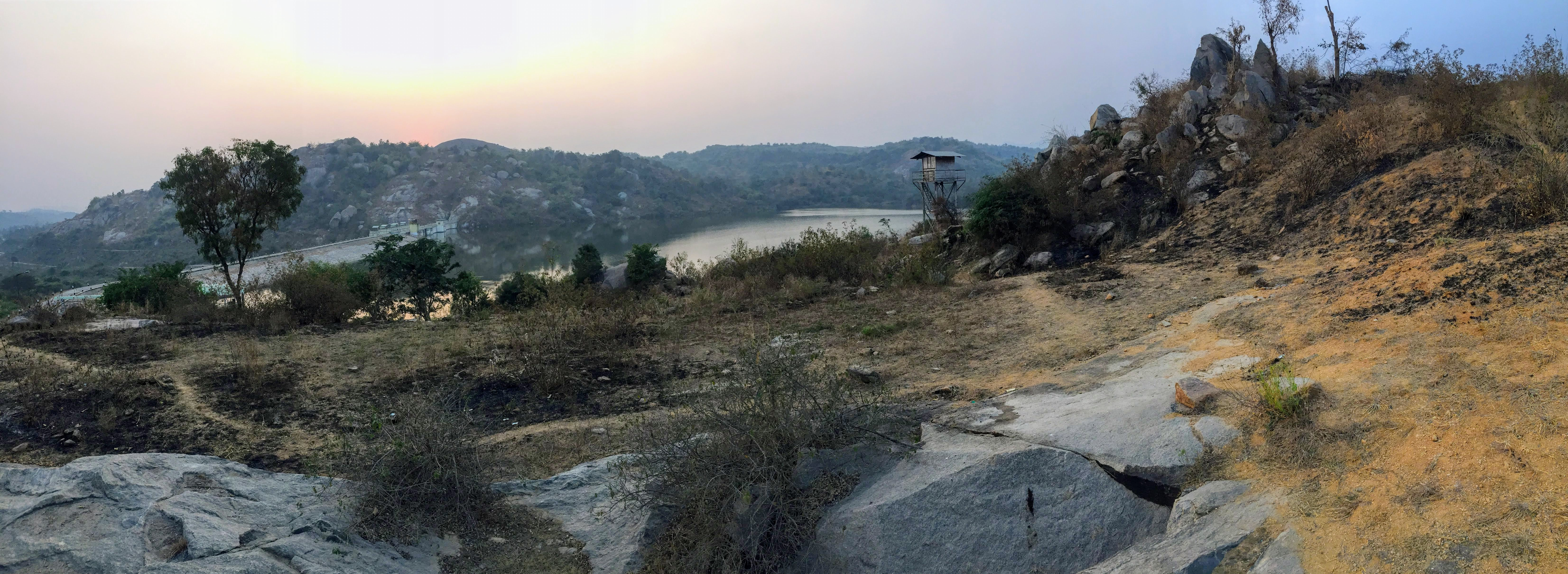
View of Manchanabele dam reservoir from the nearby hills

== Notable people ==
- Siddalingaiah - popular poet and activist in Kannada, was born in the village.
