= B. Krishnappa =

Indian academic, social activist

- Born: 9 June 1938; Harihar
- Died: 30 April 1997 (aged 58); Gadag
- Occupations: Academic; activist; writer

Prof. Basappa Krishnappa (1938–1997) was one of the pioneers of the Dalit literary movement in Kannada and the founder president of Dalit Sangarsha Samiti, later it is named as (Karnataka Dalita Sangharsha samiti) the radical Dalit advocacy group. He taught at the Sir M. Vishweshwariah College in Bhadravathi for thirty years before retiring as principal. He is acknowledged as an important literary critic in Kannada.

== Movement ==
A social revolutionary, Krishnappa's presence is felt in most of the landmark Dalit struggles of Karnataka, especially those aimed at getting land for Dalits and fighting for Dalit women's self-respect.

B. Krishnappa, along with Siddalingaiah, K. B. Siddaiah and others, was one of the founders of Dalita Sangharsha Samiti.
