= H. S. Shivaprakash =

Poet and playwright

H S Shivaprakash
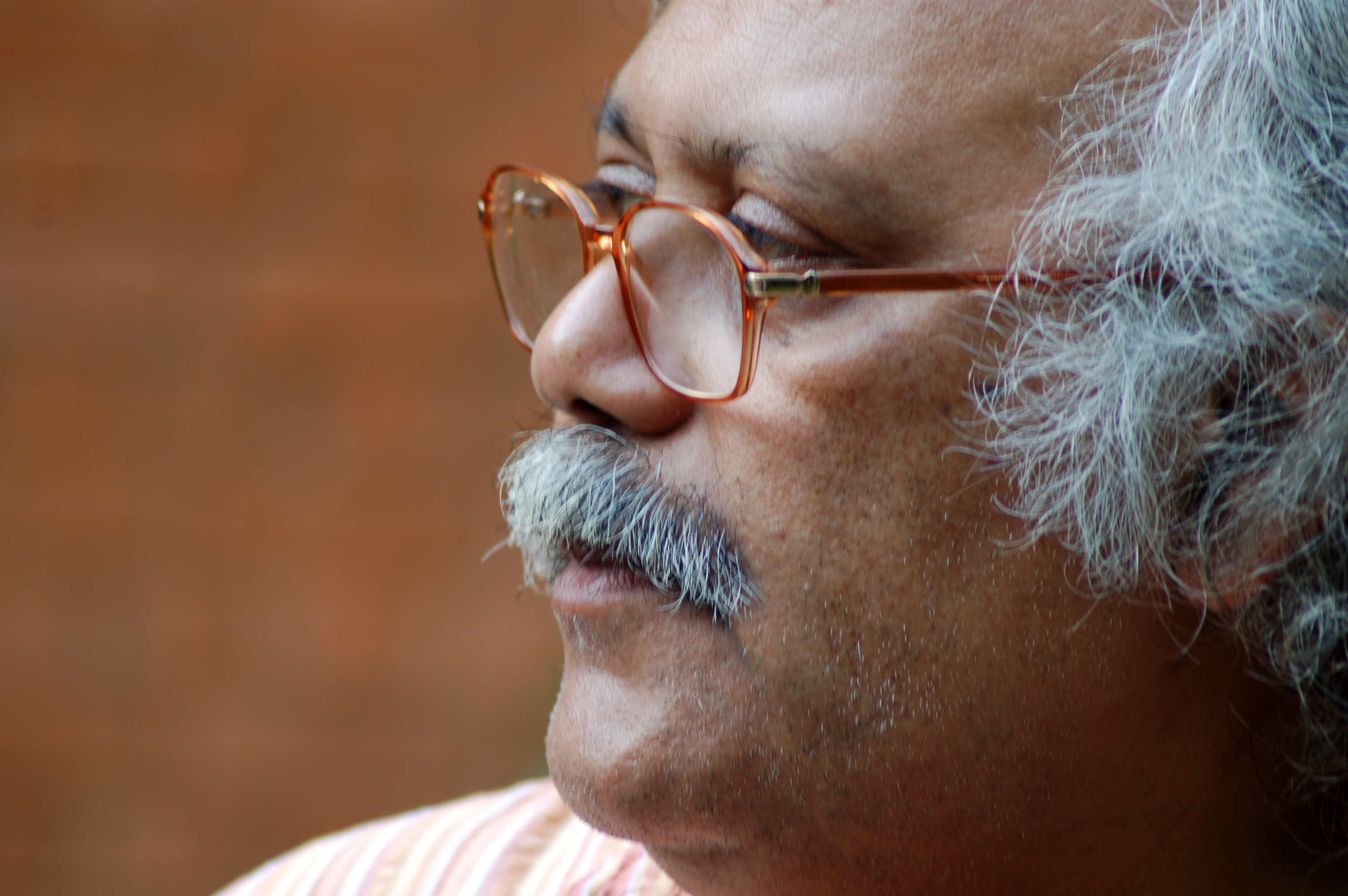
- Born: Hulkuntemath Shivamurthy Sastri Shivaprakash; 1954 (age 71–72)
- Occupations: Writer, editor, translator, professor, former Director-Tagore Centre, Berlin
- Writing career
- Genres: Poetry, play, criticism
- Subjects: Indian theatre, Kannada literature, Vachanas, Oral traditions, Mythology
- Movements: Navya and Bandaya movement

Hulkuntemath Shivamurthy Sastri Shivaprakash (born 1954) is a leading poet and playwright writing in Kannada. He is professor at the School of Arts and Aesthetics, Jawaharlal Nehru University, New Delhi. He heads the Cultural Centre at Berlin, known as the Tagore Centre, as Director run by Indian Council for Cultural Relations (ICCR). He has seven anthologies of poems, twelve plays, and several other books to his credit. His works have been widely translated into English, French, Italian, Spanish, German, Polish, Hindi, Malayalam, Marathi, Tamil and Telugu. His plays have been performed in Kannada, Hindi, Meitei, Rabha, Assamese, Bodo, Tamil and Malayalam. Shivaprakash is also a well-known authority on vachana literature, Bhakti movements of India, and Sufi and other mystic traditions.

== Life and career ==
Shivaprakash was born in Bangalore in June 1954. His father Shivamurthy Shastri was an eminent Veerashaiva scholar and served under the erstwhile Maharaja of Mysore. After obtaining his MA in English literature from Bangalore University, Shivaprakash joined the Karnataka government service as an English lecturer and taught for over two decades at various colleges in Bangalore and Tumkur. In 1996, he was appointed the editor of Indian Literature, the bimonthly journal of Sahitya Akademi in New Delhi. Shivaprakash joined the School of Arts and Aesthetics in Jawaharlal Nehru University as associate professor in 2001, where he is professor of Aesthetics and Performance studies. In 2000, he was selected for the International Writing Program of the School of Letters, University of Iowa, and is honorary fellow of the school. Professor H. S. Shiva Prakash served as Director of Tagore Centre in Berlin (2011-2014). He retired from JNU in 2019 and has been living in Bangalore since 2021.

== Poet ==
Shivaprakash published his first anthology of poems Milarepa in 1977, when he was still 23. It was immediately recognized as a fresh voice in Kannada poetry. But Shivaprakash gained popularity and acclaim only with his second anthology, Malebidda Neladalli in 1983. The poem "Samagara Bhimavva" became an instant hit, which brought him to the centre-stage of post-Bandaya Kannada poetry. Since then Shivaprakash has published four collections of poetry, Anukshana Charite, Suryajala, Maleye Mantapa and Matte Matte and two anthologies of poems in translation, Maruroopagalu and Nanna Mainagara, and edited the translation of contemporary Gujarati poetry, Samakaleena Gujarati Kavitegalu and Malayalam poetry Manasantara. Shivaprakash's poems make use of mystic symbolism, dream-images, archetypes and motifs from everyday life to portray the nature of power and the contradictions of modern life.

== Playwright ==
Shivaprakash published his first play Mahachaitra in 1986. The stage-adaptation of the play by C.G.Krishnaswamy for the troop Samudaya became a major hit. The play was based on the life and times of the 12th century Veerashaiva saint Basavanna and narrated the struggles of the artisan saints of the city of Kalyana (now Basavakalyan) through a Marxist analytic. The play received rave reviews and was acknowledged as a landmark in Kannada literature. Mahachaitra is recognized as one among the three greatest plays out of the 25-odd plays on Basavanna written in Kannada, the other two being P. Lankesh's Sankranti and Girish Karnad's Taledanda.

Shivaprakash won the Karnataka Sahitya Akademi award for this play. His other plays include Sultan Tipu, Shakespeare Swapnanauke, Manteswamy Kathaprasanga, Madari Madayya, Madurekanda, Madhavi, Matrika, Makarachandra, Sati, Cassandra and Maduvehennu. He has also translated Shakespeare's King Lear and adapted Federico García Lorca's The Shoemaker's Prodigious Wife into Kannada under the title Mallammana Mane Hotlu and Shakespeare's Macbeth under the name Maranayakana Drishtanta. Manteswamy Kathaprasanga, a play about a 16th-century Dalit saint was made into a successful stage adaptation by director Suresh Anagalli and produced over 300 shows. It kindled interest in this obscure saint and the life of Manteswamy has since been a major area of research in Kannada academia. Most of Shivaprakash's plays are inspired by Marxism and Shaiva mysticism, particularly Veerashaivism and Kashmir Shavism. The plays also employ motifs from Sufism and other forms of mysticism like Mahayana and Zen Buddhism. Structurally, the plays are inspired by Japanese Noh theatre and Brecht's epic theatre.

== The Mahachaitra controversy ==
Mahachaitra was prescribed as a textbook for undergraduate courses in three universities of Karnataka. In 1995, nearly a decade after its publication, when it was prescribed as a textbook in Gulbarga University, it caused a heated controversy. A section of Lingayats under the leadership of the nun Shri Shri Jagadguru Mate Mahadevi accused the work of portraying Basavanna in poor light and urged the Government of Karnataka to ban the play. It led to a legal battle and the play was eventually withdrawn from the university syllabus. The Mahachaitra controversy seems to have inspired Githa Hariharan's English novel In Times of Siege (2003), which narrates the story of a professor in an open university in Delhi, who finds himself in the midst of a controversy over a chapter on Basavanna which he wrote for an undergraduate textbook.

== Major works ==
=== Poetry ===
- Milarepa
- Malebidda Neladalli
- Anukshana Charite
- Suryajala
- Maleye Mantapa
- Matte Matte
- Mabbina Haage Kanive Haasi
- Maruroopagalu (Kannada translation of poems from various languages)
- Nanna Mainagara (Kannada translation of the Malayalam poems of K. Satchidanandan)
- Navilu Nagara (songs from his plays)
- Maatu Mantravaaguvavrege
- Maretuhoda Dombaraake(Kannada translation of Spanish poems by Zingonia Zingone)
- Kavite Indinavarege (Collected poems)
- Autumn Ways (Haiku in English)
- Maagiparva (Kannada Haikus)
- I Keep Vigil of Rudra (English translation of Kannada Vachanas)

=== Plays ===
- Mahachaitra
- Sultan Tipu
- Shakespeare Swapnanauke
- Manteswamy Kathaprasanga
- Madari Madayya
- Madurekanda
- Madhavi
- Matrika
- Makarachandra
- Sati
- Cassandra
- Maduve Hennu
- King Lear (Kannada translation of Shakespeare's play)
- Maranayakana Drishtanta (Kannada adaptation of Macbeth)
- Mallammana Mane Hotlu (Kannada adaptation of Federico García Lorca's The Shoemaker's Prodigious Wife)
- "Nataka Illiyavarege 2011 (C0llected Plays)

=== Others ===
- Sahitya mattu Rangabhoomi (a treatise on literature and theatre)
- Modala Kattina Gadya (a collection of essays)
- Yuganta (Kannada translation of Irawati Karve's book of the same name)
- Batteesa Raaga (Spiritual autobiography)

In English:

- Incredible India: Traditional Theatres (New Delhi: Wisdom Tree, 2007)
- I Keep Vigil of Rudra: the Vachanas (New Delhi: Penguin India, 2010)
- Everyday Yogi (New Delhi: HarperCollins India, 2014)

== Awards and honours ==
- Kusumagraja Rashtriya Puraskar-2017.
- Karnataka Sahitya Akademi Award for Poetry: Malebidda Neladalli (1983), Suryajala (1995)
- Four Kannada Sahitya Akademi best book prizes
- Sangeeth Natak Akademi Award (1997)
- Satyakama award for 2003
- Ministry of Human Resource Development fellowship for Kannada literature
- Honorary Fellow of the School of Letters, University of Iowa, since 2000.
- Karnataka Rajyotsava Prashasti, 2005.
- Sahitya Akademi Award (2012)
