= D. R. Nagaraj =

Indian writer critic (1954–1998)

- Born: Doddaballapura Ramaiah Nagaraj; 20 February 1954; Doddaballapur, Mysore State (now in Karnataka), India
- Died: 12 August 1998 (aged 44)
- Education: MA, PhD
- Occupations: Literary critic, thinker
- Relatives: Kishore Kumar G
- Writing career
- Notable works: Sahitya Kathana; The Flaming Feet and Other Essays
- Movement: Bandaya movement

Dr. D. R. Nagaraj (20 February 1954 – 12 August 1998) was an Indian cultural critic, political commentator and an expert on medieval and modern Kannada poetry and Dalit movement who wrote in Kannada and English languages. He won Sahitya Akademi Award for his work Sahitya Kathana. He started out as a Marxist critic but renounced the Marxist framework that he had used in the book Amruta mattu Garuda as too reductionist and became a much more eclectic and complex thinker. He is among the few Indian thinkers to shed new light on Dalit and Bahujan politics. He regarded the Gandhi-Ambedkar debate on the issue of caste system and untouchability as the most important contemporary debate whose outcome would determine the fate of India in the 21st century.

He was one of the founders of the Bandaya movement along with Shudra Srinivas and Siddalingaiah, and gave the movement its famous slogan, "Khadgavagali kavya! Janara novige midiva pranamitra!" ("Let poetry be a sword! The dear friend who responds to the pain of people!")

== Early life ==
Doddaballapura Ramaiah Nagaraj was born on 20 February 1954 to Ramaiah and Akkayyamma in Doddaballapur, in the erstwhile Mysore State of India (present-day Karnataka). His family belonged to the Devanga (weaver) caste and his father was a teacher. Nagaraj was schooled in his hometown, after which he studied at the Government Arts and Science College, Bangalore. He was known as an excellent debater in college and it was during these intercollegiate debates that he got interested in Dalit and Bahujan politics.

Nagaraj went to study further and obtained a master's degree and then a PhD from Bangalore University. In 1975, he joined Bangalore University as a research scholar in the Kannada Department (formally known as the Kannada Adhyayana Kendra), and subsequently became part of the Kannada faculty.

== Career ==
Nagaraj rose through the ranks at the Bangalore University, quickly becoming a Reader, and then just before his death in 1998 he was named for the newly established Kailasam Chair.

In addition to his primary affiliation with the Kannada Department of Bangalore University, Nagaraj was a fellow at the Indian Institute of Advanced Study, Shimla (1993–4); Senior Fellow at the Centre for the Study of Developing Societies (CSDS, Delhi (1994–6); and visiting professor in the Department of South Asian Languages and Civilizations at the University of Chicago (1997 and 1998).

Nagaraj wrote six books among several essays in Kannada. He has also edited 15 Kannada books, including an anthology of Urdu literature. Flaming Feet is his collection of essays on the Indian Dalit movement whose title article "Flaming Feet" discusses the varied philosophies of Mahatma Gandhi and B. R. Ambedkar on Dalit emancipation and tries to find an underlying unity. A revised and extended version of this book was posthumously published as The Flaming Feet and Other Essays: The Dalit Movement in India in 2011. Listening to the Loom: Essays on Literature, Politics and Violence is his other collection of essays. These books have been translated into Tamil and Telugu languages. He also published many essays in English. Many of his Kannada essays have been translated into English and other languages since his death.

At the time of his death in 1998, Nagaraj was serving as the Director of Shabdana — Centre for Translation, a project of the Sahitya Akademi, and editor of Akshara Chintana, a series of critical works published by Akshara Prakashana of Heggodu. In the months preceding his death, he was "probing the nature of feminism as a frame for a new dalit literary criticism."

== Personal life ==
Nagaraj met his wife Girija, while he was teaching at Bangalore University. Girija was a student of literature as well as science. They have two children, Amulya and Anoop. Nagaraj died of a heart attack in 1998, aged just 44.

== Select bibliography ==
Dr. Nagaraj published his first book, Amruta mattu Garuda (Nectar and the Eagle) in 1983 and the second book, his PhD thesis on modern Kannada poetry and poetics, Shakti Sharadeya Mela (The Festival of Shakti and Sharade) shortly thereafter. Between 1987 and 1993, he mostly published critical essays in English and Kannada. He also edited a lot of important books.

=== Critical works ===
In Kannada

- Amrutha Mattu Garuda (1983) (Marxist analysis of Modern Kannada literature)
- Shakti Sharadeya Mela: Adhunika Kannada Kavyada Adhyanana. Heggodu: Akshara Prakashana (PhD thesis on Modern Kannada poetry and poetics)
- Sahitya Kathana (1996) Heggodu: Akshara Prakashana.
- Samskriti Kathana (2001) Ed. by Agrahara Krishnamurthy
- Allama Prabhu Mattu Shaiva Pratibhe (1998) Heggodu: Akshara Prakashana. (on the 12th century Vachana poet Allama Prabhu. Published posthumously)

In English

- The Flaming Feet: The Dalit Movement in India. Bangalore: Institute of Cultural Research and Action, 1993.
- The Flaming Feet and Other Essays: The Dalit Movement in India. Ed. Prithvi Datta Chandra Shobhi. Permanent Black, 2011 (ISBN 978-1906497804).
- Listening to the Loom: Essays on Literature, Politics and Violence. Ed. Prithvi Datta Chandra Shobhi. Seagull Books, 2014 (ISBN 9780857421920).
- Allama Prabhu and the Shaiva Imagination. Translated by N. S. Gundur. State University of New York Press, 2026 (ISBN 979-8-8558-0729-5) & Permanent Black, 2026 (ISBN 978-81-7824-706-9).

=== Edited and translated ===
- Urdu Sahitya (1990) - Edited volume of Urdu Literature
- Vasanta Smriti (1993) - Translation of Jalaluddin Rumi's poems

== Awards and honours ==
- Vardhamana Award (1988)
- Shivarama Karanth Award (1995)
- Sahitya Akademi Award (Posthumous, 1998)
