= Chikkupadhyaya =

Indian writer

- Born: Lakshmipathi c.1640 Mysore, Karnataka
- Died: after 1691
- Occupation: writer
- Known for: Kannada literature

Chikkupadhyaya was born (around 1640 AD) to RangAcharya and NachiyAramma in TerakanAmbi in Mysore district of Karnataka. His name at birth was Lakshmipathi. He was the elder twin brother of Devaraja. He belonged to a family of Vedic scholars and poets. He traces his lineage to Sri Allaalanatha (Kannada form of the name Arulaala naatha which denotes Kanchi Varadaraja - as described in one of the Hoysala inscriptions,) and the family deity being Kanchi Varadaraja.

He later moved to and settled in Melkote in Mandya district. He belonged to Shatamarshana (Purukuthsa, or Vishnu-vruddha) lineage of Hebbar Srivaishnava community. Nathamuni, Aalavandaar (Yaamunachaarya), Periya Thirumalai nambi and Bhagavadh Raamanuja's mother all belonged to Shatamarshana lineage. Chikkupadhyaya was a disciple of Sri Kadambi Singaracharya.

The title of Chikkupadhyaya was conferred on Lakshmipathi by Sri Chikka Devaraja Wodeyar for whom he acted as minister and teacher. 'ChikkupAdhyAya' in Kannada means teacher of Sri Chikka Devaraja Wodeyar.

He could be the most prolific writer of Kannada literature. He has more than 30 literary works to his credit. His best known works are Vishnu Purana (1691), Kamalachala Mahatmya (1681), Hastigiri Mahatmya (1679), Rukmangada Charite (1681), Satvikabrahma-Vidya-Vilasa on Visishtadvaita philosophy, and Yadugiri Mahatmya in praise of Kadambi Srirangacharya His other well-known works are Divya Suri Charitre, a history of the twelve Alvar saints; Artha Panchaka ("Five truths"), on saint Pillai Lokacharya; a commentary on Tiruvayimozhi of mystic-saint Nammalvar; and a collection of seventy songs called Shringarada Hadugalu in praise of his patron Chikka Devaraja (pen-name "Chikkadevaraja").[89]

His works are

1. aksharamAlika sAngathya
2. Amaruka shathaka
3. kamalAchala mahAthmya
4. kAmandaka teekay
5. Chikkadevraja shtungAra padagalu
6. chithra shathaka sAngathya
7. ThiruvAymozhi teekay
8. divya sUri charithe
9. Neethi shathakada sAngathya
10. paschima ranga mahAthmya
11. purusha virahada sAngathya
12. Yadugiri sAngathya
13. yAdava giri mahAthmya
14. rangadhAma sthuthi sAngathya
15. paschima ranga sAngathya
16. rangaswamiya sUthra udAharaNe
17. rukmangadacharithe
18. Vishnu PurANa
19. Vishnu PurANa gadya
20. Venkatagiri mahAthmya
21. VaidyAmritha teelay
22. shuka sapthathi
23. ShrungAra shathakada sAngathya
24. ALavndhAr sthOthra teeku
25. Bhagavadgeetha teeku
26. Hasthigiri mahAthmya
27. sAthvika brahma vidya vilAsa
28. mukunda mAla teeku
29. sri ranganAtha paduka sahasra teeku
30. Padma purANa samhitha teeku
31. prapannAmritha padya rUpa

== See also ==
- Karnataka Literature
