= Pratibha Nandakumar =

Indian poet, journalist, theatre activist

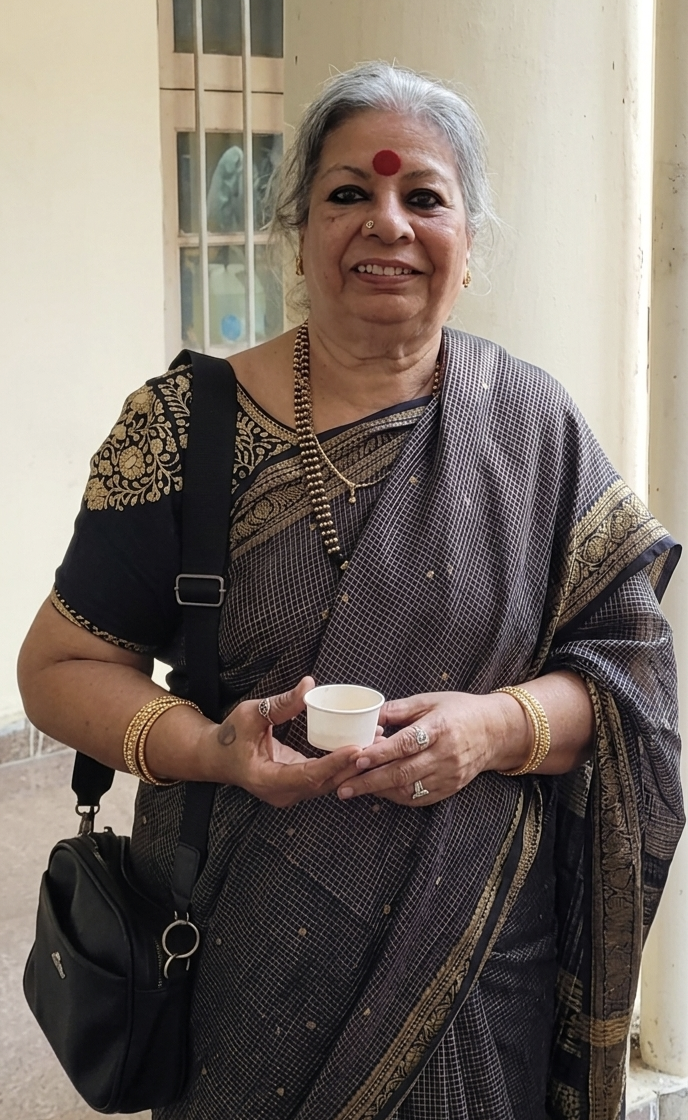
- Pratibha in 2026
- Born: 25 January 1955 (age 71); Bangalore, Karnataka, India
- Occupations: Journalist; poet; scholar; writer
- Spouse: Nandakumar
- Children: 2
- Parent(s): Yamunabai (mother); V. S. Ramachandrarao (father)
- Writing career
- Language: Kannada, English
- Genres: Poetry; travelogue; translation; research; criticism
- Subjects: Feminism; modern women literature

Pratibha Nandakumar (born 25 January 1955) is an Indian poet, journalist, feminist, columnist and activist who works in Kannada and English. She is considered as one of the pioneers of modern woman's poetry in Kannada literature. For her work Kavadeyaata, Pratibha was awarded the Karnataka Sahitya Akademi Award for Poetry in 1998.

== Personal life ==
Pratibha was born on 25 January 1955 in Bangalore to Ramachandrarao and Yamunabai. An alumna of Madras University, Pratibha married to Nandakumar and they have a son and daughter.

== Career ==
As poet

Pratibha published her first work, Naavu Hudugiyare Heege (lit. 'This Is How We Girls Are'), a collection of poems in 1979, was considered path-breaking literary work by many. Her other important works including ‛ Aha Purushakaram’, ‛Ee Tanaka’, ‛Rastheyanchigina Gaadi’, ‛Yaana’, ’Akramana’ and others.

Media and theatre works

Pratibha has worked as journalist, columnist and special correspondent for leading newspapers including Indian Express, Deccan Herald and Bangalore Mirror.

Pratibha is known for her experimental works in theatre. She organised a unique way of presenting poems with the performance of the poets, called ‛Ondu Lessu Ondu Plassu’, which was well received. She also experimented Teredashte Bagilu, a literary work of Jayanth Kaikini, into multi-media installation, an art form.

== Literary works ==
Poetry

1. Navu Hudugiyare Heege
2. Ee Tanaka
3. Rasteyanchina Gaadi
4. Kavadeyaata
5. Aha! Purushakaram
6. Cowboys Mattu Kama Purana
7. Mudukiyarigidu Kaalavalla
8. Coffee House
9. Erotica

Essays

1. Nimmi (2000)
2. Mirchi Masala (2001)

Short Fiction

1. Akramana (1997)
2. Yaana (1997)

Autobiography

1. Anudinada Antharagange

== Accolades ==
1. Karnataka Sahitya Akademi Award for Poetry (1998)
2. Shivarama Karantha Prashasti (1996)
3. Mahadevi Verma Kavya Samman (2003)
4. Hoogar Memorial Award for Journalism (2006)
