= Jaggu Vakulabhushana =

Sanskrit poet and writer

Jaggu Vakulabhushana was an eminent Sanskrit poet and writer. He was born Alwar Iyengar in 1902 at Chatraghosha near Melukote, India (Vakulabhushana was his pen name) and died in 1994. He was awarded the Sahitya Academy award for his seminal work "Jayantika".

== Works ==
=== Sanskrit works ===
- Jayantika-Gadyakavya, based on Bana's Kadambari (1990)
- Yaduvamsacaritam – Gadyakavya based on Bana's Harsacarita
- Adbhutadutam an epic in 15 cantos, based on Udyaogaparvan on the Mahabharata (1968),
- Karunarasatarangini- Khandakavya,
- Patikoktimala – poetry,
- Srngaralilamrtam – poetry
- Kalikautukam – an unpublished Khandakavya,
- Gitaraghavam – poetry
- Vasantavatamsavarnanam – Khandakavya
- Bharatasamgrahah – Campu
- Yatirajacampu – Campu
- Yatrodantacampu – Campu
- Laksmistutimanjari – devotional poem,
- Hayavadanastotram – devotional poem,
- Amrtadhirohini – devotional poem,
- Aghavighatini – devotional poem, on Rama; (unpublished)
- Laksmidandakah – devotional poetry,
- Yadusailasatakam – Satakakavya,
- Gandhinutih – poem, unpublished;
- Kodandaramasuprabhatam – devotional poetry,
- Vasudevasuprabhatam – devotional poetry, (unpublished);
- Dasarathisuprabhatam – devotional poetry, (unpublished);
- Subrahmanyasuprabhatam – devotional poetry, (unpublished);
- Madhyaranganathastotram – devotional poetry, (unpublished)
- Madhyaranganathasuprabhatam – devotional poetry, (un-published);
- Madhyaranganathasatanamastotram – devotional poetry,(unpublished);
- Madhyaratiganayiksuprabhatam – devotional poetry, (unpublished);
- Mahalaksmisuprabhatam – devotional poetry,
- Sriyoganrsimhasuprabhatam – devotional poetry,
- Sriyoganrsimhamangalastotram – devotional poetry,
- Srimallesvarakrsnasuprabhatam – devotional poetry,
- Srimallesvarakrsnamangalam – devotional poetry,
- Madhyajanardana suprabhatam – devotional poetry,
- Janardanasumangalam – devotional poetry,
- Venkataryavandanam –- devotional poetry,
- Prapannavani- devotional poetry,
- Adbhutamsukam – play, (precursor to Venisamhara of Bhattanarayana)
- Pratijnakautilyam – play, (precursor to Mudrarakshasa of Vishakhadatta)
- Prasannakasyapam-play,(successor of Abhijnanasakuntala of Kalidasa)
- Karmahalam – play, unpublished,
- Maniharanam – play, (successor of Bhasa's Urubhanga)
- Maiijulamaiijiram – play
- Balivijayam –play,
- Amulyamalyam – play,
- Yauvarajyam – play,
- Pratijñåśāntanavam – play,
- Anangadāprahasnam – a farce,
- Samyuktā – a play,
- Nighnatāpasam – a play, 1982
- Navajīmūtam – a play 1986,
- Mugdhakuntalam – play, 1993
- Prabuddhaprajñam. Play 1993
- Kaumudīyam – play, 1993
- Vīrasaubhadram – play, precursor to Dūtaghatotkaca of Bhāsa
- Vrataphalam – play, 1993
- Kalikālusyam – play, 1993
- Dāśarathidarśanam – play, 1993
- Vitīrnāmrtam – play, 1993
- Syamantakam – play, 1993
- Maireyapāramyam – play, 1993

==== Critical works ====
- Bhāvakaumudī – (Commentary on the play Kādambarīkalyāna)
- Upākhyānaratnamañjūsā – Commentary on Kshemendra's Cārucaryā

==== Miscellaneous works ====
- Kanakamuktāmani
- Shringerī śankarāryasvāgatam
- Samasyāpūranāni
- Suvarnānyoktipañcakam
- Cātuślokāh
- Anyoktimālā, (unpublished);
- Adbhutavijñāpannam,
- Prasannakāśyapavijñaptih
- Syamantakavijñaptih
- Pratijñākautilyvijñaptih(unpublished);
- Yaduvamśa-caritavijñaptih

=== Translations ===
- Srīvacanabhūshanam – (from Sanskrit into Kannada)
- Caramupāyanirnayah

=== Other works ===
- Laksmīdāsasāhiyam
- Ajñātagranthāh

=== Works in Kannada ===
- Naguvintagantu (Autobiographical comic story),
- Rādhāmohan – Cine-play,
- Rāmjīrangsthola – comic essays,
- Melunadina Bhāgyodaya,
- Ambarīsacarita,
- Bhagavatya-daśaka,
- Vedāntavū Sāhityavū,
- Janārdasuprabhātopodgātha,
- Māhālakshmīsuprabhātopodgātha,
- Srīvacana-bhūśanopodgātha,
- Amrtādhirohinīsuprabhātopodgātha,
- Padmapurāna (translation of 3 chapters – unpublished),
- Gītopanyāsa,
- Rāmāyanopanyasa.

== Awards and recognition ==
- Sahitya Akademi award for creative writing in Sanskrit.
- President's certificate of honour.

== Bibliography ==
- Encyclopedia of Indian Literature, Sahitya Academy, 1988
- Adhunik Sanskrit Natak, Ramaji Upadhyaya, 1977
- Who is who of Sanskrit Scholars in India, Sahitya Academy, 1993
