= Siddalingaiah (poet) =

Indian poet (1954–2021)

Dr. Siddalingaiah
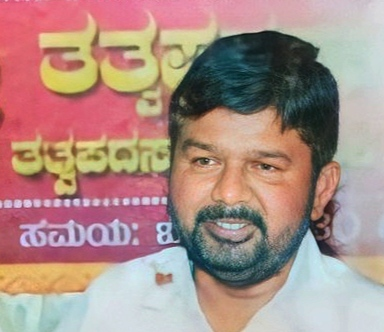
- Siddalingaiah at Tathvapada singers gathering in Mandya in 2012
- Born: Siddalingaiah; 3 February 1954; Manchinabele, Mysore State (present–day Karnataka), India
- Died: 11 June 2021 (aged 67); Bangalore, India
- Education: M. A. and Ph.D in Kannada - Bangalore University
- Occupations: Poet; Dramatist; Professor; Legislator; Activist
- Writing career
- Period: 1954–2021
- Genre: Dalit-Bandaya Movement
- Notable works: Holemadigara Haadu, Saviraaru Nadigalu and Meravanige
- Notable awards: Padma Shri (Posthumous)
- Movement: Dalit-Bandaya movement

Siddalingaiah (1954 in Magadi, Bangalore – 11 June 2021) was one of the most prominent Kannada poets, writers and social activists in India. He is particularly remembered for his work benefitting the poor, the down-trodden and the marginalised castes to which he himself belonged. He was also one of the founders of the Dalit Sangharsha Samiti, which is a major political organisation fighting for the rights of the Dalit people since the 1970s. His writings and poetry reflected his own experiences and also through which he conducted his social activism by employing his wit, humour and irony to highlight the cause of the Dalits and their indomitable spirit.

Siddalingaiah was an Indian poet, playwright, and Dalit activist, writing in the Kannada language. He is credited with starting the Dalit-Bandaya movement in Kannada and with starting the genre of Dalit writing. He is one of the founders of the Dalita Sangharsh Samiti along with B. Krishnappa.

== Early life and background ==
Early in life, Siddalingaiah experienced societal discrimination and hardship. In his autobiography, Ooru Keri (1996), he describes how upper-caste landlords frequently humiliated his father, Dyavanna, a landless labourer. Seeing his father yoked like an ox to work a field is one particularly horrific memory that deeply affected young Siddalingaiah. Early on, his rebellious nature became apparent; he imitated school inspectors, skipped lessons to go swimming in neighbouring rivers, and sarcastically questioned teachers. These stories show a young child who used humour as a defence against embarrassment and refused to fit in. He supported his schooling by working odd jobs, including cleaning, where he smeared soot on his face to avoid being recognised, a moving metaphor for Dalit invisibility. His time at Bengaluru University was a life-changing experience. Siddalingaiah started composing poetry as a way to express his rage and rebellion after being exposed to radical political ideas and the growing Dalit struggle. These experiences gave rise to early compositions, which combined unadulterated emotion with sharp societal criticism. Early poems of Siddalingaiah, such as Hole Madigara Haadu (1975), which he wrote before attending college, captured the rage and disobedience of the Dalit community . His compositions, such as "Kappu Kadina Haadu" and "Saaviraaru Nadigalu", became rallying points for Dalit demonstrations. He co-founded the Dalita Sangharsha Samiti (DSS), a crucial group in Karnataka's Dalit struggle, after being influenced by socialist leader Ram Manohar Lohia and B.R. Ambedkar. Siddalingaiah's early life, characterised by deprivation, defiance, and intellectual curiosity, laid the foundation for his later role as a trailblazing Dalit writer and activist by fusing journalism, critical analyses, and autobiographical excerpts.

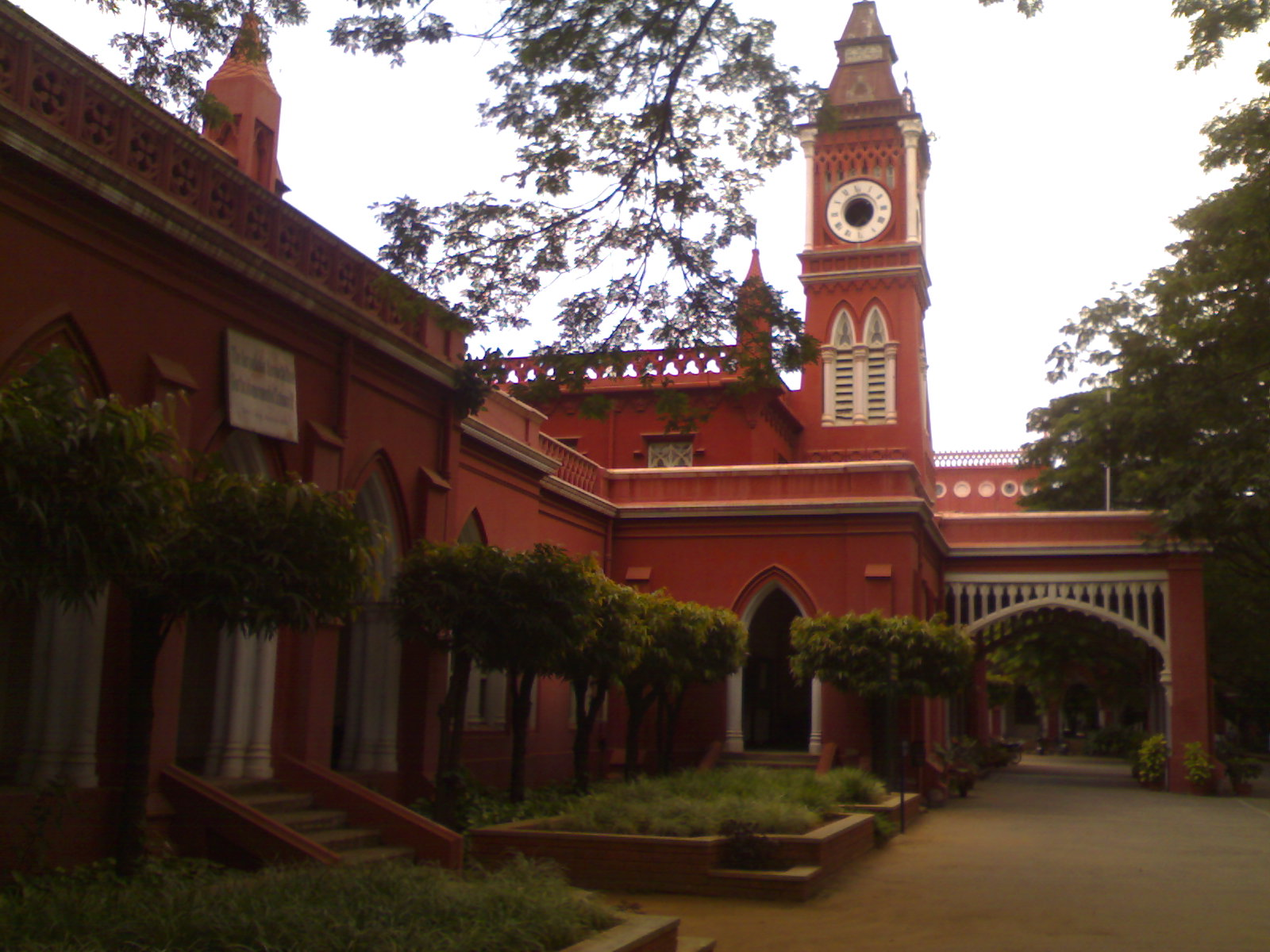
Bengaluru University

== Education and career ==
Siddalingaiah was born in the Magadi taluk region of present day Ramanagara district in Karnataka and faced casteism and numerous forms of discrimination in the hands of the upper classes. His early schooling and education as a result took place in different villages of the district because of the limitations and restrictions he faced due his caste. However, he had an avid interest in learning and was a voracious reader ever since he was a child. He admitted to spending most of his time in the Bengaluru Central Library located in Cubbon Park. His fellow dalit writer and Rajya Sabha member L Hanumanthaiah even remarked that he was found "more in libraries rather than in classes". He obtained his Master of Arts from Bengaluru University and then started working as a research assistant at the Centre for Kannada Studies at Bengaluru University (1976-1981). He finally became a lecturer in Kannada (1981-1992) and rose to the post of the director of the Centre for Kannada Studies in the University of Bengaluru. He subsequently rose to the position of Dean, Faculty of Arts in Bengaluru University between the years 2001-2003 and he even had the distinction of being a member of the Academic Council of Bangalore University between 2002 and 2003. He further headed the Kannada Book Authority (2008) and also chaired the 81st Akhila Bharata Kannada Sahitya Sammelana held at Shravanabelagola in 2015. His prose and novels unlike his poems were more mischievous, energetic and full of vigour. They however had the same legendary wry sense of humour for which Siddalingaiah was known for. He also wrote many plays such as "Panchama" and "Ekalavya" and one of his most important writing works included Graamadevathegalu, which was a field study of village deities and rituals in Karnataka for which he was awarded his PhD in 1989 under the guidance of Dr.G.S. Shivarudrappa, who is a rashtrakavi of India (national poet). Even though he was known for his humorous yet fiery poetry, and as a writer activist, he wrote some film songs as well. Siddalingaiah wrote a romantic film song for the Kannada movie Dharani Mandala Madhyadolage (1983) under the pseudonym of Aaditya, and this song won him a state award. He was a prolific writer and academedician and had made many contributions within field of music, literature, arts all throughout his life. He made every effort to use his art for the cause of the downtrodden Dalit community to which he belonged.

== Political career ==
Siddalingaiah, the Dalit activist writer and poet were influenced by the political doctrines of Ambedkar and Lohia, and he wished to bring about positive changes for his downtrodden brethren by joining the field of politics. He became Member of the Legislative Council, Government of Karnataka for two consecutive terms i.e. from 1988 to 1994 and 1995-2001. Even though many people from the Dalit community had accused him of being an opportunist and of having compromised his ideals for personal political gain, Siddalingaiah went on to prove his love and loyalty towards his caste people. He was instrumental in abolishing the very inhuman practice of Ajalu. The Ajalu system was practiced in some parts of Dakshina Kannada wherein Koragas were treated as untouchables. They were at the receiving end of numerous atrocities and tortures and after becoming a Member of the Legislative Council, Siddalingaiah raised the issue to abolish the system in the Legislative Assembly of Karnataka. Following many sessions of debate over the inhumanity that the system stood for in the garb of tradition, the government finally banned Ajalu from taking place all over Karnataka. From 2006 to 2008, Siddalingaiah further acted as the chairman of Kannada Development Authority, a position of Cabinet rank through which he made numerous beneficial changes in the lives of the Dalits living in Karnataka. Siddalingaiah is also the founder of the Dalit Sangharsh Samiti along with B. Krishnappa and DSS has been quite active politically ever since the 1970s in Karnataka fighting for the rights of the Dalits. The political and moral vision of the founders of DSS although inspired by Ambedkar and other Dalit leaders, however did not prevent them from associating with the non-violent ideologies of Gandhi and other mainstream liberal political leaders. He was for a long time associated with BJP and as an MLC he had raised many issues pertaining to the Dalit community to bring about their betterment. Home Minister Amit Shah even visited his house and felicitated him for his contributions to the state of Karnataka and to the community to which he belonged.

== Role in Dalit movement ==
A trailblazing Kannada Dalit poet, author, and activist, Siddalingaiah (1954–2021) was instrumental in forming the Dalit literary and political movement in Karnataka. His writings became songs of resistance for the underprivileged because they were imbued with extreme defiance and insightful societal analysis. Siddalingaiah sprang from Bangalore's slums, and his activism and poetry were firmly grounded in Dalit realities, opposing caste systems and promoting social justice. In the 1970s, Siddalingaiah was a co-founder of the radical Dalita Sangharsha Samithi (DSS), which organised Dalits against caste injustice. Hole Madigara Haadu (Song of the Holeya-Madiga), one of his earliest poems, expressed the anger and suffering of Dalits and served as a rallying cry for the movement. The vile brutality and humiliation experienced by Dalits were revealed in poems such as "Ikrala, Odila" (Thrash, Kick), which struck a deep chord with the disenfranchised. His writings inspired a generation of activists and served as both literary and political instruments. Siddalingaiah's later years witnessed a turn towards cultural affirmation—a politics that aimed to restore Dalit identity beyond simple opposition to Brahminism—whereas his early work was characterised by militant resistance. Using humour and subversion to affirm Dalit cultural sovereignty, he examined Dalit folklore, deities, and oral traditions in works such as Avataragalu (Incarnations). However, other Dalit revolutionaries criticised this shift, seeing his involvement in mainstream politics, especially his time as a Member of the Legislative Council (MLC), as a trade-off. In his capacity as an MLC, Siddalingaiah supported Dalit causes, particularly the abolition of the Ajalu tradition in Dakshina Kannada, which involved dehumanising ceremonies performed on Koraga Dalits. His legislative actions brought attention to the relationship between caste and labour, highlighting political participation and education as means of achieving empowerment.

Despite his achievements, Siddalingaiah was criticised for his alleged closeness to power, which included his contentious comments on Manusmriti and his admiration for BJP officials. However, his followers contend that his later writings, which promoted self-respect and cultural dignity, attempted to reinterpret Dalit politics beyond conflict. A prominent pioneer in Dalit literature and activism, Siddalingaiah was posthumously given the Padma Shri. His legacy endures in the continuous fight for equality. He made a lasting impact on India's social justice scene with his life and writings, which perfectly capture the Dalit movement's transformation from protest to assertion.

== Major works and themes ==
A trailblazing Dalit poet and activist from Karnataka, Siddalingaiah (1954–2021) is renowned for his sharp literary works that combine ecological awareness, cultural affirmation, and political wrath. His writings, which have their roots in Dalit experiences, examine issues of resistance, nature, labour, and caste injustice.

=== 1. Dalit resistance and political rage ===
Hole Madigara Haadu (Song of the Holeya-Madiga), one of Siddalingaiah's earliest poems, captures the rage of the Dalit movement. His fiery poetry opposed Brahminical oppression and motivated a new generation of activists. Dalit protest anthems, such as Ikrala and Odila (Thrash, Kick), revealed the harsh reality of caste violence. According to author NS Shankar, his writing captures the "inner emotional state of the Dalit movement". His poetry is full of imagery and through lines such as "They killed the sun and hid the moon" "My people who carried the huge slabs on their shoulders etc." (Chenni, 2021) he shocks his readers with violence inherent in the lives of the Dalits.

=== 2. Dalit identity and cultural affirmation ===
Siddalingaiah aimed to uphold Dalit cultural identity without resorting to confrontation. In his autobiography Ooru Keri (A Slum in the Village), he recounts his upbringing in a Dalit ghetto in a hilarious and moving way, using storytelling to regain his dignity. He promoted a "politics of cultural affirmation," honouring Dalit labour, folklore, and gods, in contrast to the militant politics of organisations such as the BSP. In Avataragalu (Incarnations), he asserts Dalit spiritual traditions while satirising caste hierarchies.

=== 3. Caste and nature ===
In Siddalingaiah's writings, caste exploitation and nature are frequently combined. He refers to a drain as "the holy Ganga" for Dalits in Ooru Keri, signifying their marginalised but tenacious way of life. His literature juxtaposes Dalit realities—where land, rivers, and animals are sites of labour and stigma—with the idealised upper-caste conception of nature. For example, he utilises cacti and the moon to poetically connect ecological and social justice in his poetry, Maatada Beku (I Must Have a Word).

=== 4. Oppression and labour ===
A major theme in Siddalingaiah's stories is labour. As an example of the dehumanising caste-based labour system, Ooru Keri describes his father working as a human plough. His writings demonstrate how Dalits' labour is exploited but elevated through group resiliency, whether in urban slums, fields, or forests.

=== 5. Subversion and humour ===
Siddalingaiah used humour in both his lectures and writings. To disarm oppressors, he made fun of his own size by joking that he was being carried by the masses in trains. As with Avataragalu, his light-hearted tone promoted unity while challenging casteist prejudices. His admirers contend that he used his influence to end abuses like the Ajalu system, which dehumanised Koraga people, while detractors accused him of political compromise by taking legislative posts. His later writings, such as Kappu Kadina Haadu (Black Bitter Song), question global rights beyond people and show a change from rage to contemplation. In his autobiographical work "Ooru Keri" he uses humour to portray the struggle of a Dalit person. He refuses to reduce the lives led by the Dalits to one of misery and victimhood and instead through his work depicts their strategies for survival. Through humour and wit, he wished to convey the rebellion that lies at the heart of the Dalit people who refuse to bow down.

=== Poetry ===
- Saaviraaru Nadigalu (Thousands of Rivers, 1979)
- Kappu Kaadina Haadu (The Song of the Black Forest, 1982)
- Aayda Kavithegalu (Selected Poems, 1997)
- Meravanige (Procession, 2000)
- Nanna Janagalu mattu Itara Kavitegalu (My People and Other Poems, 2005)
- Kudiva Neeliya Kadalu (2017)
- Ooru Saagaravagi (2018)

=== Autobiography ===
- Ooru Keri-1 : Atmakathana (1997)
- Ooru Keri-2 : Atmakathana (2006)
- Ooru Keri-3 : Atmakathana (2014)
- Ooru Keri - An Autobiography (Sahitya Akademi, 2003)
- A Word With You, World: The Autobiography of a Poet (Navayana, 2013) Translated by S.R. Ramakrishna ISBN 978-81-89059-55-2 OCLC 854755733 (Excerpt)
- Satyanarayana, K & Tharu, Susie (2013) From those Stubs Steel Nibs are Sprouting: New Dalit Writing from South Asia, Dossier 2: Kannada and Telugu, New Delhi: HarperCollins India. ISBN 978-0-14-341426-1 OCLC 972832070

=== Plays ===
- Panchama
- Nelasama
- Ekalavya

=== Criticism and essays ===
- Hakkkinota
- Gramadevathegalu
- Avataragalu
- Jana Samsakruthi
- Aa Mukha Ee Mukha

== Awards and honours earned before his death ==
Siddalingaiah had been festooned with numerous awards, honours and accolades throughout his entire lifespan. He received the best lyricist award in 1984 from the Government of Karnataka for his contribution in creating love songs for the Kannada movie "Dharani Mandala Madhyadolage" (1983). He then went on to receive the Rajyotsava Award in the year 1986 from the Government of Karnataka. For his contributions to the cause of the Dalit community, he received the Dr. Ambedkar Centenary Special Award, 1992 from the Government of Karnataka, Dr. Ambedkar Award in the year 2002 from Bharatiya Dalit Sahitya Academy, Sathyakama Foundation Award, 2002 from the Sathyakama Foundation, Babu Jagajivan Ram Award,2005 from the Government of Karnataka. For his literary and academic contributions, he received the Karnataka Sahitya Academy Honorary Award, 1996 from the Government of Karnataka, the Sandesh Prashasti award 2001, the Janapada Thajna Award, 2001 from the Karnataka Janapada and Yakshagana Academy, Government of Karnataka, the Nadachetana Award, 1999 from Rangachetana Balaga, Bangalore, the Nadoja-2007 award from the Kannada University, Hampi, and the Pampa award, the highest literary award granted by the government of Karnataka.

== Legacy and posthumous recognition ==
It is commonly accepted that Siddalingaiah's legacy placed Dalit identity at the forefront of Kannada literature and politics and legitimised popular discourse among marginalised populations. Given the disparity between his radical origins and his alleged political concessions, his subsequent affiliation with the Bharatiya Janata Party (BJP) has drawn criticism. His influence is still significant in spite of these arguments. His institutional recognition and cultural prominence were demonstrated by his posthumous receipt of the Padma Shri in 2021 and the Karnataka Pampa Award. In addition, Siddalingaiah had significant positions, including chairing the Kannada Development Authority and teaching at Bengaluru University, where he helped up-and-coming Dalit authors like Devanur Mahadeva. His poetry is still relevant in today's protest areas, particularly Maatada Beku, which has come to represent the significance of local Dalit movements on a worldwide scale.

== Death and commemoration ==
Siddalingaiah's death brought in a public outpouring of love, and this has its symbolic meaning for Dalit communities. Siddalingaiah faced issues and had his pandemic struggles, including difficulties accessing healthcare, as indicative of larger systemic inequities faced by marginalised groups, even though the current counterfoil only mentioned his COVID-19-related death on June 11, 2021. The outpouring of mourning from Dalit leaders, who characterised his death as the loss of a guiding voice in the movement, was covered. Posthumous tributes, including the special issue of Caste: A Global Journal that celebrated his contributions to Dalit activism and writing. Dalit activists' thoughts highlighted his unmet goals for the Dalit Sangharsh Samiti (DSS), especially his idea of a united Dalit political front. Siddalingaiah's legacy inspired ongoing resistance and cultural affirmation, framing his death as a time of shared grief and reaffirmation of dedication to the issues he supported.
