= Hattimattur =

- village
- Interactive map of Hattimattur
- Country: India
- State: Karnataka
- District: Haveri
- Talukas: Savanur

Population (2001)
  - Total: 6,829

Languages
  - Official: Kannada
- Time zone: UTC+5:30 (IST)

Hattimattur is a village in the southern state of Karnataka, India. It is located in the Savanur taluk of Haveri district in Karnataka.

== Demographics ==
As of the 2001 India census, Hattimattur had a population of 6,829, with 3,467 males and 3,362 females.

== See also ==
- Haveri
- Districts of Karnataka
