= Bendre =

Bendre (also Bendrey) is a surname native to the state of Maharashtra, Madhya Pradesh and Goa. Typically it is found in the Chandraseniya Kayastha Prabhu (CKP), Chitpavan Brahmin and Deshastha Rigvedi Brahmin (DRB) communities.

Notable people with the surname include:

- D. R. Bendre, a poet of the Navodaya period of Kannada language
- V.S. Bendrey, an eminent Indian historian of medieval and early modern period
- N. S. Bendre, an Indian artist and one of the founder members of Baroda Group
- Sonali Bendre, Indian actress and model
