= Halakere =

- Village
- Location within Karnataka Location within India
- Coordinates: 15°36′58.56″N 75°52′43.49″E
- Country: India
- State: Karnataka
- District: Gadag district
- Taluk: Gajendragada
- Lok Sabha Constituency: Haveri

Population (2001)
  - Total: 3,816

Languages
  - Official: Kannada
- Time zone: UTC+5:30 (IST)
- PIN: 582 119
- Vehicle registration: KA 26

Halakere is a village in the Gajendragada taluk of Gadag district in the Indian state of Karnataka. Halakere is famous for Sri Annadaneshawara Mutt. Halakere is Southeast to the taluka Place Gajendragada.

== Demographics ==
As of 2001 India census, Halakere had a population of 3,816 with 1,860 males and 1,956 females and 747 Households.

== See also ==
- Naregal
- Gajendragad
