= Padmabbarasi Basadi =

10th-century Jain temple in Karnataka, India

Religion
- Affiliation: Jainism
- Sect: Digambara

Location
- Location: Naregal, Gadag, India

Architecture
- Style: Rashtrakuta architecture
- Creator: Padmabbarasi
- Established: 950 CE

Padmabbarasi Basadi, also known as the Naregal Basadi or Padmabbarasi Jinalaya, is a 10th-century Jain temple at Naregal in Gadag district, Karnataka, India. The temple was commissioned in 950 CE by Padmabbarasi, a queen of the Western Ganga dynasty and wife of Butuga II, during the reign of the Rashtrakuta king Krishna III.

The temple was originally conceived as a trikuta, or triple-shrined temple. It is considered one of the largest surviving temples associated with the Rashtrakuta period in Karnataka.

== History ==
The construction of the temple is recorded in the Naregal inscription of 950 CE. The inscription identifies Padmabbarasi as a wife of the Western Ganga ruler Butuga II and records that she constructed a Jain basadi at Naregal. A dānaśālā, or charitable establishment, was attached to the basadi. The inscription also records a gift of a tank for the benefit of the dānaśālā.

Padmabbarasi was a prominent Jain patron of the Western Ganga royal family. She also made several endowments to the temple. An inscription from Koppal records that Padmabbarasi later undertook sallekhana under the Jain monk Maladharideva and died in 973 CE. The record also recalls her construction and endowment of the Jain temple at Naregal.

== Architecture ==
The Padmabbarasi Basadi is a north-facing, triple-shrined temple. Its original plan comprises a principal garbhagriha, an intermediate hall and a sabhāmaṇḍapa, opening into a large entrance hall from which the additional sanctums are approached.

The principal garbhagriha, originally intended to house an image of a Jina, is square in plan. The two subsidiary sanctums, situated to the east and west, are rectangular and face each other. A distinctive feature of the two subsidiary sanctums is the presence of long rectangular pedestals extending between their walls. Each pedestal contains twenty-four sockets intended for images of the twenty-four Tirthankaras. The sabhāmaṇḍapa contains twelve star-shaped pillars. Their lower sections are square, while the upper portions incorporate octagonal and multi-fluted forms. The pillars carry taranga-potika capitals.

=== Vimana ===
The principal sanctuary is surmounted by a vimana of the Dravidian type. The square plan of the central sanctuary contrasts with the rectangular subsidiary sanctums, producing an unusual arrangement within the triple-shrine plan. The architectural design of the basadi is regarded as an important example of temple architecture under the Rashtrakutas. Nagarajaiah describes the Naregal Jinalaya as one of the largest Rashtrakuta shrines.

== Later history ==
The original Jain identity of the building changed in a later period. The former Jain temple came to be used as a Hindu temple and has been referred to as the Narayana temple.

Despite the later change in religious use, its original Jain function is established by the 950 CE Naregal inscription and by its architectural arrangement, particularly the subsidiary sanctums designed to contain sets of twenty-four Tirthankara images.

== Significance ==
Padmabbarasi Basadi is important for the history of Jainism under both the Western Gangas and the Rashtrakutas. The dated inscription provides direct evidence for royal female patronage of Jain religious institutions in 10th-century Karnataka. The temple is also notable for its unusual triple-sanctum arrangement and the provision for sets of twenty-four Tirthankara images in its subsidiary sanctums.

Padmabbarasi's construction of the Naregal basadi formed part of wider Jain patronage by the family of Butuga II. Butuga and members of his family sponsored Jain establishments at several centres in northern Karnataka.

== See also ==
- Western Ganga dynasty
- Jain temples, Halebidu

== Sources ==
- Chugh, Lalit (2016), Karnataka's Rich Heritage - Art and Architecture: From Prehistoric Times to the Hoysala Period, vol. 6, Notion Press, ISBN 9789352068258
- Archaeological Survey of India (1927). "Bombay-Karnatak Inscriptions". South Indian Inscriptions. Vol. XI. Madras: Government of India. pp. 23–24.
- Nagarajaiah, Hampa (2000). A History of the Rāṣṭrakūṭas of Malkhed and Jainism. Bangalore: Ankita Pustaka. pp. 222–223.
- Nagarajaiah, Hampa (1999). History of the Early Ganga Monarchy and Jainism. Bangalore: Ankita Pustaka.
