= Akkigund =

Coordinates: 15°11′N 75°31′E

- village
- Akkigund is in Gadag district
- Interactive map of Akkigund
- Country: India
- State: Karnataka
- District: Gadag
- Talukas: Shirhatti

Government
  - Body: Village Panchayat

Languages
  - Official: Kannada
- Time zone: UTC+5:30 (IST)
- ISO 3166 code: IN-KA
- Vehicle registration: KA
- Nearest city: Gadag
- Civic agency: Village Panchayat
- Website: karnataka.gov.in

Akkigund is a village in the southern state of Karnataka, India. It is located in the Shirhatti taluk of Gadag district in Karnataka.

== See also ==
- Gadag
- Districts of Karnataka
