= Naregal =

Naregal may refer to places in India:

- Naregal, Gadag, a village in Gadag district in the state of Karnataka
- Naregal, Haveri, a village in Haveri district in the state of Karnataka
