= Adrahalli =

Coordinates: 15°07′N 75°35′E

- village
- Interactive map of Adrahalli
- Country: India
- State: Karnataka
- District: Gadag
- Talukas: Shirhatti

Government
  - Body: Village Panchayat

Languages
  - Official: Kannada Gormati
- Time zone: UTC+5:30 (IST)
- ISO 3166 code: IN-KA
- Vehicle registration: KA
- Nearest city: Gadag
- Civic agency: Village Panchayat Local bodies
- Website: karnataka.gov.in

Adrahalli is a village in the southern state of Karnataka, India. It is located in the Shirhatti taluk of Gadag District.

== See also ==
- Gadag
- Districts of Karnataka
