= Venkatapura, Gadag =

Venkatapura
- Village
- Location within Karnataka Location within India
- Coordinates: 15°20′59″N 75°51′26″E
- Country: India
- State: Karnataka
- District: Gadag district

Languages
  - Official: Kannada
- Time zone: UTC+5:30 (IST)
- PIN: 582113
- Telephone code: 08372
- Vehicle registration: KA-26

Venkatapura is a village in the Gadag district of Karnataka State in India, about 15 kilometres (9.3 mi) from Gadag.

== Sri Venkateshwara Temple ==
Within the village there is a temple dedicated to Lord Venkateshwara.

The Sri Lakshmi Venkateshwara temple is situated at Venkatapura Taluk near Sortur, Gadag District. The temple was renovated by Brahmananda Swami, a devotee of Gondavalekar Maharaj a sage from Gondavale, in Satara District of Maharashtra in the beginning of the 20th century. Arati is at 12 noon and prasad follows thereafter.

The temple is located 20 km from Gadag near the village of Beldhadi. The buses are available from Gadag Bus-Stand or Shirahatti bus stand or Hubli bus stand.

There is a direct bus service in the morning around 7 am from Hubli via Gadag. A hired taxi takes one hour from Gadag.

== See also ==
- Lakkundi
- Dambal
- Hombal
- Harti (Gadag district)
- Gadag
