= Pethalur =

- Village
- Location within Karnataka Location within India
- Coordinates: 15°19′40″N 75°48′34″E
- Country: India
- State: Karnataka
- District: Gadag district

Languages
  - Official: Kannada
- Time zone: UTC+5:30 (IST)
- PIN: 582113
- Telephone code: 08372
- Vehicle registration: KA-26

Pethalur is a village in the Gadag district of Karnataka State in India.

== Pethalur irrigation project ==
Pethalur is famous for the Pethalur Irrigation Project located near to the village.

== See also ==
- Lakkundi
- Dambal
- Hombal
- Harti (Gadag district)
- Gadag
