= Y. S. Patil =

Indian politician

Member of Karnataka Legislative Council
- In office 1 July 1978 – 30 June 1984
- Constituency: Mysore Central Graduates constituency

Member of Mysore Legislative Council
- In office 1 July 1966 – 30 June 1978
- Constituency: Mysore Central Graduates constituency

Personal details
- Born: 6 July 1927 Hombal, Gadag district, Karnataka
- Died: 25 November 2010 (aged 83) Dharwad, Karnataka, India
- Party: Bharatiya Janata Party (1980–2010)
- Other political affiliations: Bharatiya Jana Sangh (1954–1977); Janata Party (1977–1980)
- Spouse: Ambika
- Children: 2 sons
- Parent: Shankaragouda Patil (father)
- Education: Bachelor of Arts, Bachelor of Law

Yallappagouda Shankargouda Patil (6 July 1927 – 25 November 2010) commonly known as Y. S. Patil was an Indian Politician and social activist.

== Personal life ==
Born in Hombal, Gadag district, Patil often participated in social, cultural activities. He presided Jagadguru Shankaracharya Sanskrit Pathashala and was also a member of Karnatak University Senate which shows that he often got involved in educational management and religious organizations. He also served as president and was a life member of the Karnataka Vidyavardhaka Sangha. He was known for his flamboyance. Patil was also a popular writer, contributing numerous articles to newspapers.

== Political life ==
He joined Rashtriya Swayamsevak Sangh in 1942 and was also affiliated with Akhil Bharatiya Vidyarthi Parishad since 1954. He was a member of Bharatiya Jana Sangh from 1955 till its merger to Janata Party in 1977. He was elected to Mysore Legislative Council three times (twice as a Bharatiya Jana Sangh candidate and once from Janata Party representing Graduates' Constituency). He was detained under M.I.S.A. as a Political prisoner in Central Prisons, Karnataka for 13 months during Jaya Prakash movement during 1975–76.

== Death ==
He died on 25 November 2010 in a hospital in Dharwad after a brief illness.
