= Adarakatti =

- village
- Interactive map of Adarakatti
- Country: India
- State: Karnataka
- District: Gadag
- Talukas: Shirhatti

Government
  - Body: Village Panchayat

Languages
  - Official: Kannada
- Time zone: UTC+5:30 (IST)
- ISO 3166 code: IN-KA
- Vehicle registration: KA
- Nearest city: Gadag
- Civic agency: Village Panchayat
- Website: karnataka.gov.in

Adarakatti is a village in the southern state of Karnataka, India. It is located in the Shirhatti taluk of Gadag district in Karnataka. Adarakatti is about one mile from Laxmeshwar. laxmeshwar is the closest commercial town.

== See also ==
- Gadag
- Districts of Karnataka
