= G. B. Joshi =

Indian playwright

Govindacharya Bhimacharya Joshi
- Born: 29 September 1904; Hombal, Gadag district
- Died: 25 December 1993 (aged 89)
- Occupations: Playwright; publisher; producer of playwrights
- Writing career
- Pen name: Jadabharata, Anamadheya
- Period: 1950s
- Genre: Play (theatre)
- Notable awards: Padma Shri(1986); Sangeet Natak Akademi Award(1989)

Govindacharya Bhimacharya Joshi was an Indian playwright in the 1950s. He was born in Hombal village in Gadag district of Karnataka state in 1904. He established a theatre group named Vasudeva Vinodini Natya Samsthe at Bagalkot and another theatre group named Kalopasaka Mandali in Dharwad in 1954. He was also a founder publisher of Manohara Granthamala which has published the works of Jnanapeetha awardee D.R. Bendre, V.K. Gokak, Shivaram Karanth, A.N. Krishna Rao, Shankar Mokashi Punekar, N. Kasturi, R. S. Mugali, Keertinath Kurtakoti, Chandrashekhara Kambara, Girish Karnad, V. Sitaramaiah and several others.

== Notable works ==
Playwrights

- Aa Ooru Ee Ooru
- Kadadida Neeru
- Mooka Bali
- Nane Bijjala
- Nakrasheela
- Parimaladavaru
- Sattavara Neralu directed by B.V. Karanth in 1974

Novels

- Aa Ooru Ee Ooru
- Dharmasere (1934)
- Mooka Bali (1956)
- Neeru

== Awards ==
He received the Padma Shri award in 1986 and Sangeet Natak Akademi Award in 1989 for his contribution to theatre. The Karnataka Government has honoured him in 1983 and 1986 for his cultural contributions.
