= Kotumachagi =

- village
- Location in Karnataka, India Kotumachagi (India)
- Coordinates: 15.54259°N 75.771020°E
- Country: India
- State: Karnataka
- District: Gadag
- Talukas: Gadag

Population (2011)
  - Total: 7,301

Languages
  - Official: Kannada
- Time zone: UTC+5:30 (IST)

Kotumachagi is a village located in the Gadag taluk, Gadag district of Karnataka state, India. It is approximately 23 km from the district headquarters.

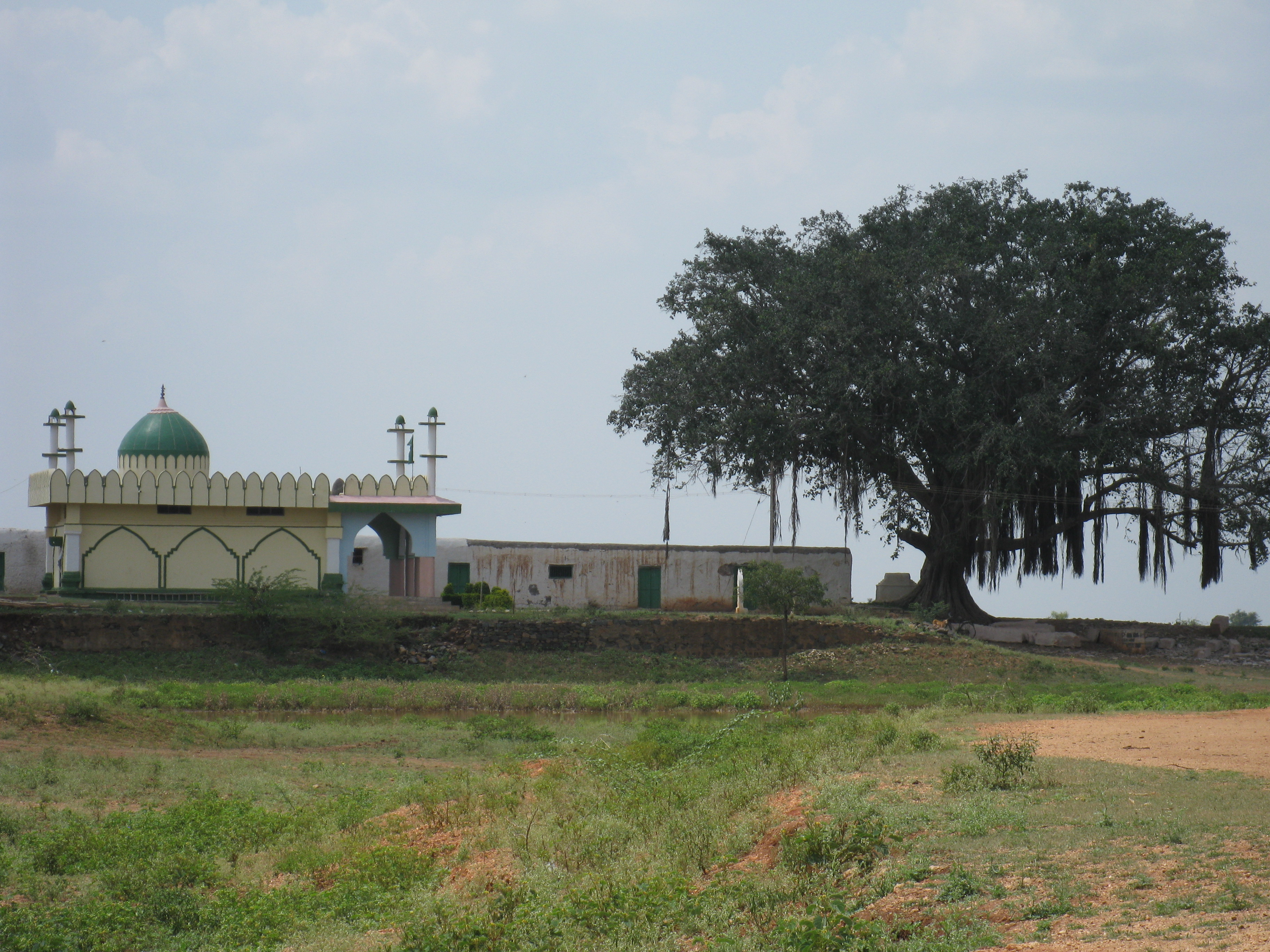
Jinda Shawali Darga Kotumachagi

== History ==
Historically, Kotumachagi was under the rule of the Kadamba dynasty. Kotumachagi is the birthplace of the poet (Kavi) Chamarasa author of Prabhulingaleele. Local people says that Chamarasa got an inspiration from Lord Someshwara to write Prabhulingaleele Prabhu Linga Leelai. There used to be an Agrahara, wherein Sanskrit classes used to take place. Near to Kotumachagi is a smaller village, Kodikoppa, which is famous for the shrine of saint Huchhirappa-ajja, who had sacrificed his life to the welfare of the society. Huchhirappa-ajja is attributed as saying (Kannada: ಯಾವುದು ಹೌದು ಅದು ಅಲ್ಲ, ಯಾವುದು ಅಲ್ಲ ಅದು ಹೌದು, which can be roughly translated to 'What it isn't, isn't what it is')

== Demographics ==
As of the 2011 census, there are 998 females per 1000 male in the village. Sex ratio in general caste is 986, in schedule caste is 1007 and in schedule tribe is 1140. There are 1002 girls under 6 years of age per 1000 boys of the same age in the village. Overall, the sex ratio in the village has decreased by 2 females per 1000 male during the years from 2001 to 2011. Child sex ratio here has decreased by 59 girls per 1000 boys during the same time.

=== Growth of population ===
Population of the village has increased by 5.9% in last 10 years. In 2001 census total population here were 6895. Female population growth rate of the village is 5.8% which is -0.2% lower than male population growth rate of 6%. General caste population has increased by 5.8%; Schedule caste population has increased by 11.1%; Schedule Tribe population has decreased by -1.2% and child population has decreased by -9.6% in the village since last census

== Temples ==
Kotumachagi has many temples, among the most famous are Lord Sri Someshwara Temple, which was built in the chalukya style, and the Grama-devate Sri Durga-Devi temple. Very grand processions and Jaatras are held during the Yugadi, Dasara, Deepavali festivals. The village also has Zindashav Ali dargah tomb of Zindashav Ali, a famous Sufi Saint from 150 to 200 years ago. Every year Urs is celebrated, which falls approximately after Makara Sankranthi. People of this village live harmoniously. All together they celebrate Yugadi, Dasara, Deepavali, Urs and Muharram festivals.

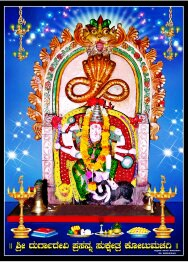
Main Deity at Durga-Devi temple

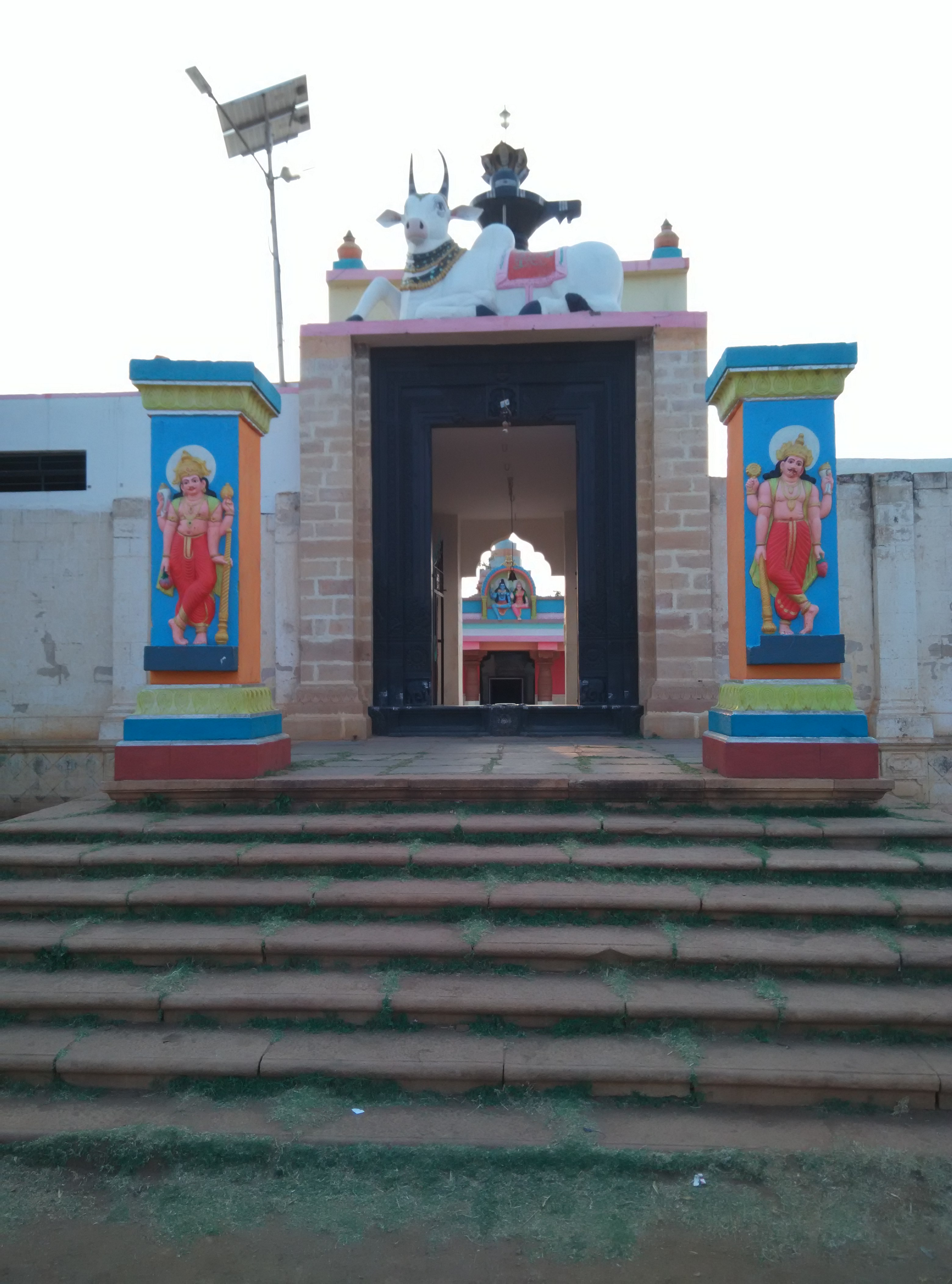
Kotumachagi Someshwara temple

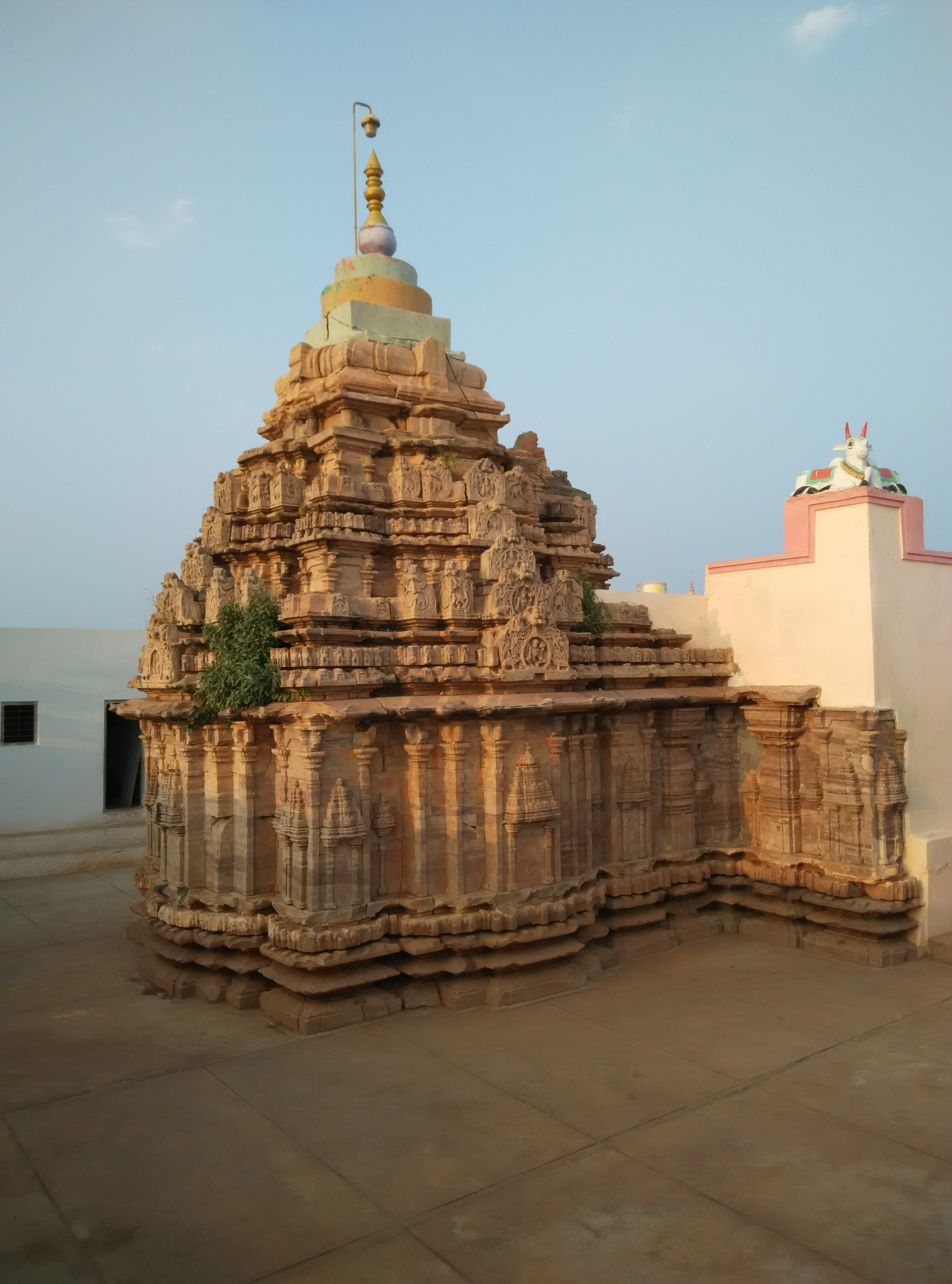
Someshwara temple Garbha Gudi sculpture

== Education ==
Kotumachagi Village has several education facilities. It has three primary model government schools, one government high school, and one government-aided high-school named Shri Someshwara High School. Both the high schools are well reputed and have contributed many officers, doctors, and engineers to the society. Dr. Banakar, an acknowledged oceanographer hails from this village only. Majority of the villagers are literate, among them 2599 are male and 1932 are female. Literacy rate (children under 6 are excluded) of Kotumachagi is 71%.

== See also ==
- Gadag
- Districts of Karnataka
