= Harti (Gadag district) =

Harti (Gadag district) Harti
- Town
- Location in Karnataka, India Harti (Gadag district) (India)
- Coordinates: 15.1269°N 75.4645°E
- Country: India
- State: Karnataka
- District: Gadag
- Elevation: 650 m (2,130 ft)

Languages
  - Official: Kannada
- Time zone: UTC+5:30 (IST)
- Distance from Bangalore: 412 kilometres (256 mi)
- Distance from Gadag: 10 kilometres (6.2 mi)

Harti is a very small town in Gadag district, Karnataka, India, with many ancient and modern Hindu temples.

== Importance ==
Harti is well known for Shri Basaveshwara Temple and for its annual festival Jatra that is held on the last Monday of Shravana Masa. It is amazing to watch the procession of the Dhyamamma statue on this festival day.

There are ancient temples built in Chalukya regime such as the Parvati Parameshwara Temple *"Sri.Uma Maheshvara Temple". Temples of Karnataka. Archived from the original on 1 October 2009. with stone carvings.

Harti has only half a dozen Muslim families and it has a tiny mosque for them. They celebrate Moharram on the last day of every year and most of the Hindus also participate in this Muslim festival, while the Muslims also participate in Hindu Festivals.

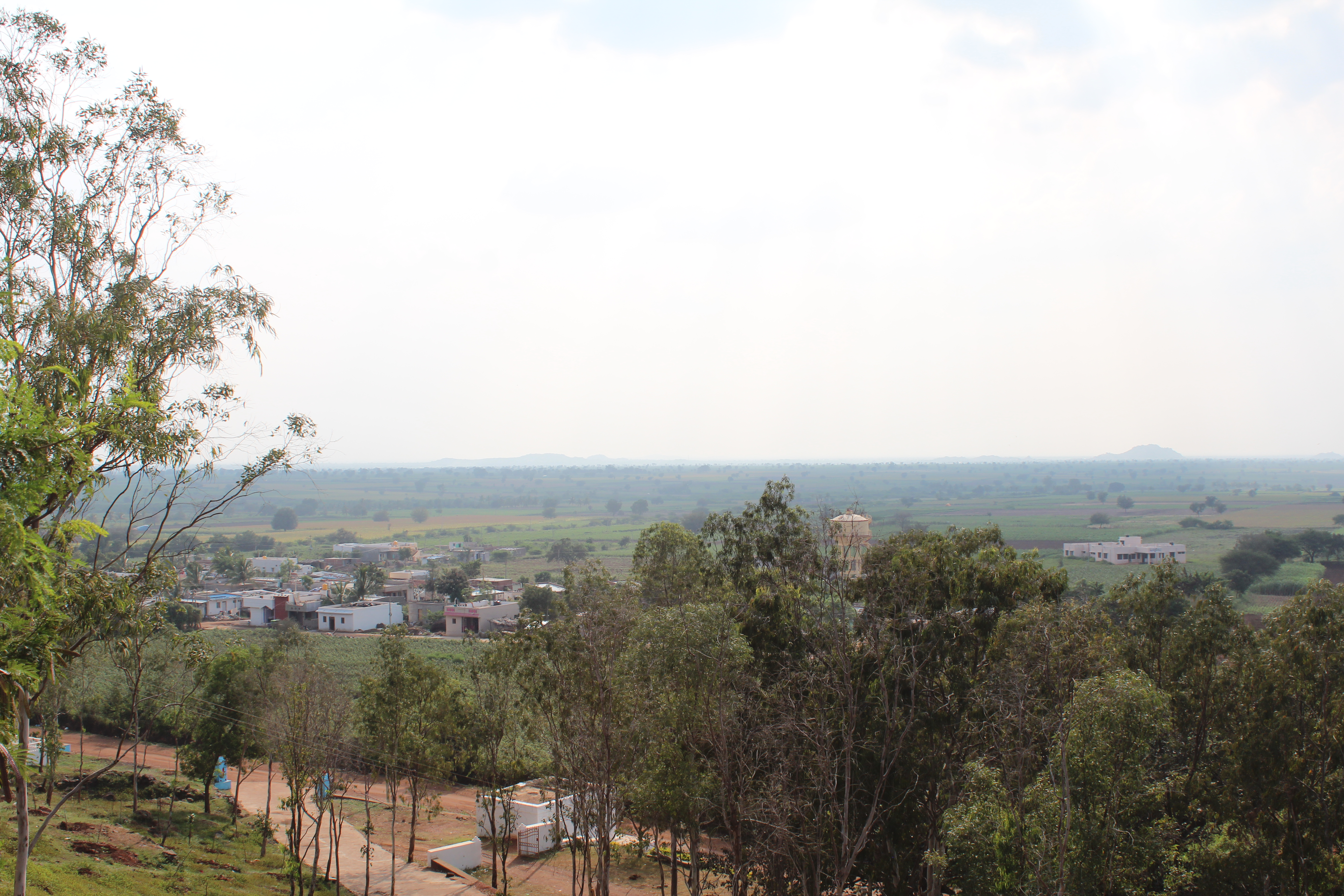

== See also ==
- Venkatapura, Gadag
- Pethalur
- Halligudi
- Harti (Gadag district)
- Gadag
- Lakkundi
- Dambal
- Hombal
