= Magadi Bird Sanctuary =

- Village
- Location within Karnataka
- Coordinates: 15.216647°N 75.511951°E
- Country: India
- State: Karnataka
- District: Gadag district
- Taluk: Shirhatti
- Lok Sabha Constituency: Haveri

Languages
  - Official: Kannada
- Time zone: UTC+5:30 (IST)
- PIN: 582117
- Vehicle registration: KA-26

Magadi Bird Sanctuary created at the Magadi tank, it is one of the biodiversity hotspots of Karnataka.

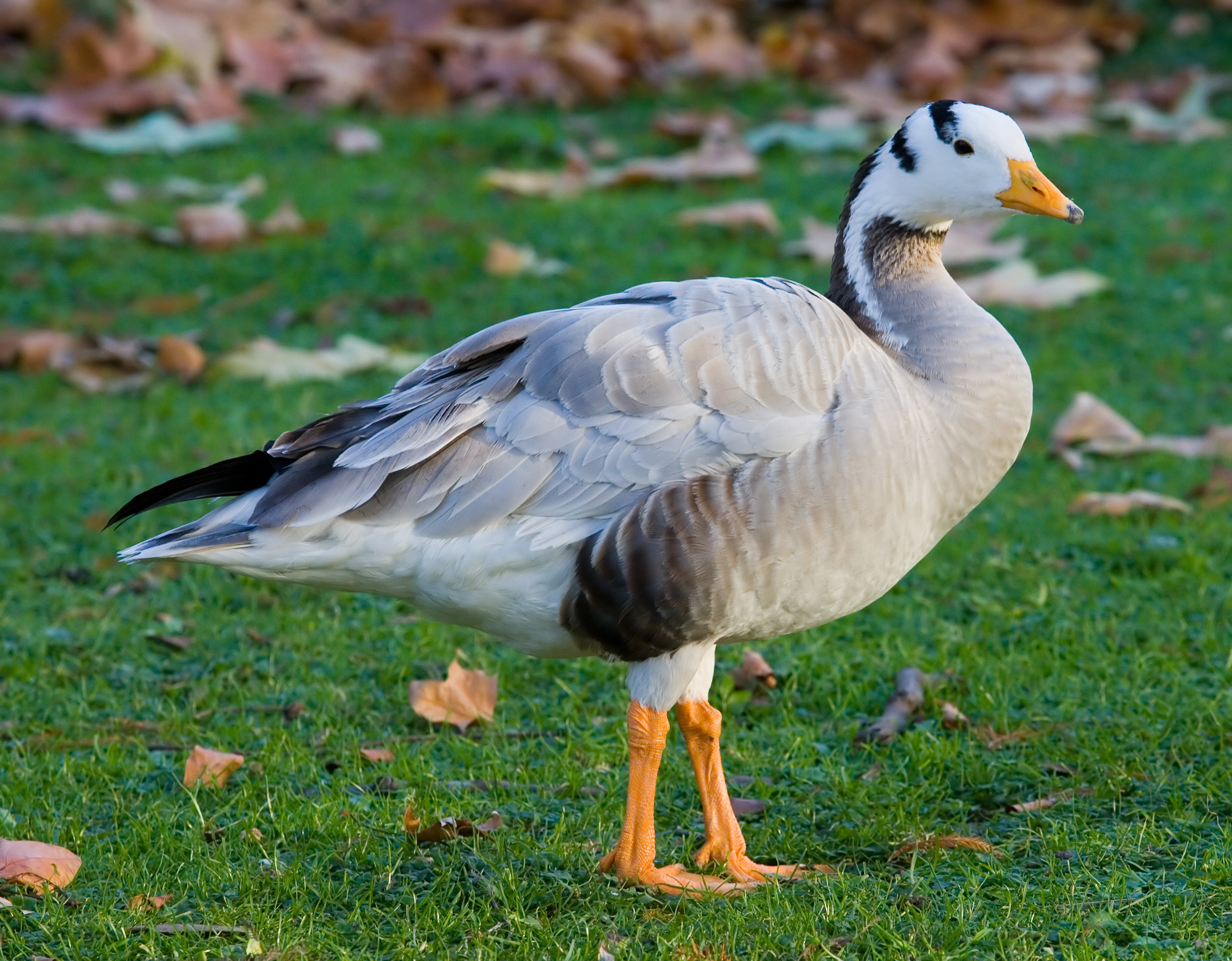
The bar-headed goose migrates to the Magadi wetlands

The Magadi tank is located in Magadi village of Shirhatti Taluk, Gadag District. From Gadag it is 26 km, it is located on Gadag-Bangalore Road, from Shirhatti it is 8 km, and from Lakshmeshwar 11 km. The sanctuary covers 134 acres of land and has catchment area of about 900 hectares.

The bar-headed goose is one of the birds which migrate to Magadi wetlands. The following bird species were also observed: Grey Heron, Purple Heron, Comb Duck, Oriental Ibis, White Breasted Water Hen, Greater Flamingo, Black winged stilt, cattle egret, Asian Open Bill Stork, Woolly necked stork, Painted stork, Eurasian Spoonbill, Ruddy Sheld Duck or Brahmini Duck. Normally birds eat fish, amphibians, molluscs, snakes etc., but migratory birds eating agricultural produce is both interesting and curious too. In the winter it feeds on barley, rice and wheat and it may damage crops.

== Controlling authorities ==
Controlling authorities of the Magadi tank are Department of Fisheries, Government of Karnataka and Village Panchayat, Magadi.

== Local institutions ==
Local institutions include the village panchayat, development of tank fisheries and bird sanctuary

Karnatak University supports the study of birds.

== See also ==
- Gadag
- Lakkundi
- Dambal
- Lakshmeshwar
- Mahadeva Temple (Itagi)
- Gadag-Betageri
