= Chennaveera Kanavi =

Indian Kannada language poet and author (1928–2022)

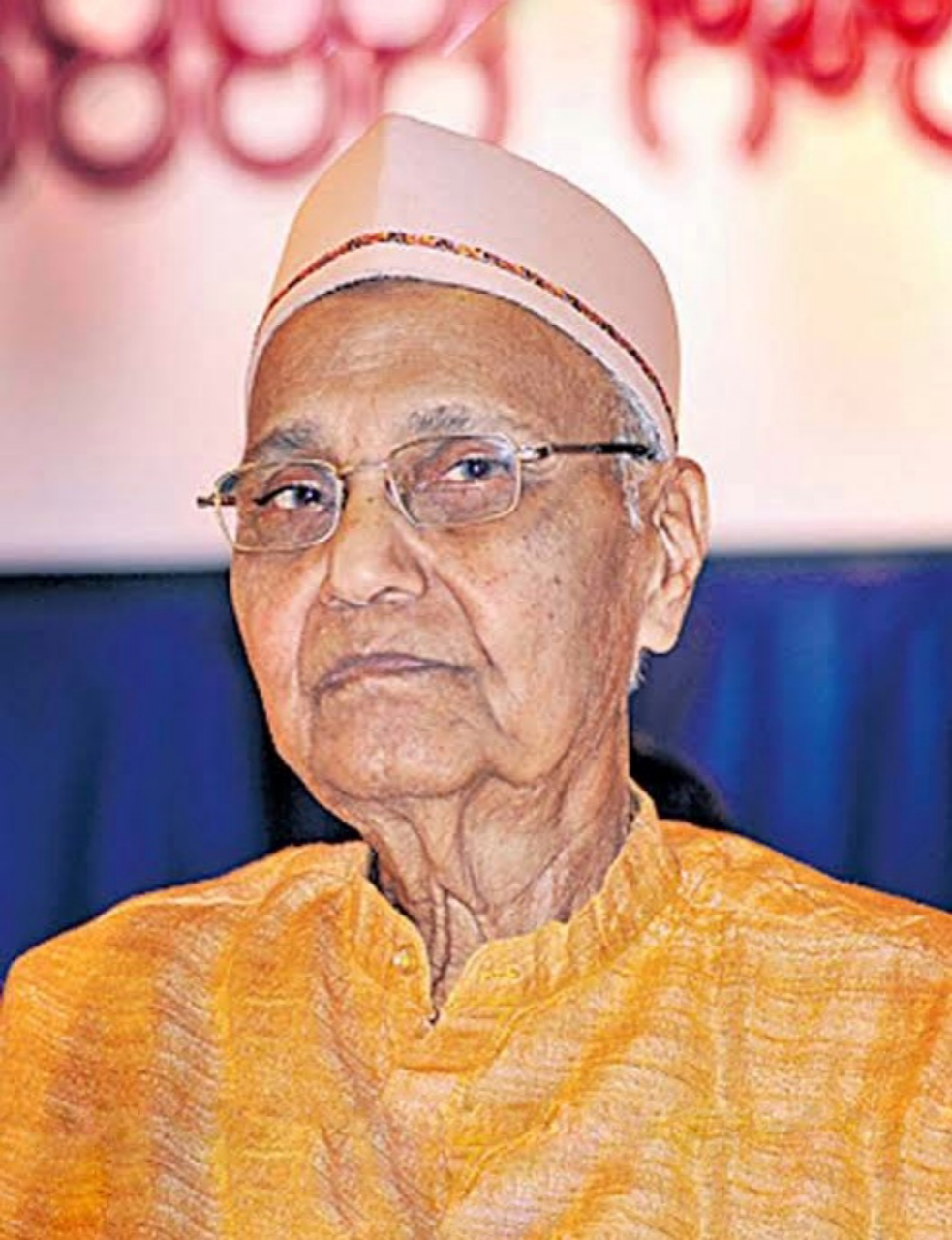
- Born: 28 June 1928; Hombal, British Raj (in-present Gadag district, Karnataka, India)
- Died: 16 February 2022 (aged 93); SDM College of Medical Sciences, Dharwad, India
- Education: Karnatak College Dharwar; Karnataka University
- Occupations: Poet, writer
- Writing career
- Years active: 1980–2022
- Notable work: Jeeva Dhwani (Poetry)
- Notable awards: Rajyotsava Award; Pampa Award

Chennaveera Kanavi (28 June 1928 – 16 February 2022) was an Indian Kannada language poet and author. In a career spanning over seven decades he wrote over 25 anthologies and over 28 books across genres. He was considered one of the major poets and writers in the Kannada language and received the Sahitya Akademi Award for his poem "Jeeva Dhwani" (lit. '"The Sound of Life"') in 1981. He was popularly known as "Samanvayada Kavi" ("the poet of reconciliation"), "Chembelakina Kavi" ("the poet of beautiful light"), and "Soujanyada Kavi" ("the poet of courtesy").

In 2011, he was awarded the Sahitya Kala Kaustubha Award. He was also a recipient of the Karnataka Sahitya Academy Award, Karnataka Rajyotsava award, and the Pampa Award.

== Early life ==
Kanavi was born on 28 June 1928 in Hombal, a village in present-day northern Karnataka, to Pravathavva and Sakkareppa. His father, Sakkareppa, was a school teacher who was noted to have taught poems from saint-poets like Nijaguna Shivayogi and Sarpabhushana Shivayogi, and other tatva-pada (philosophical songs) to the young Kanavi. These and other native folklore would form an influence on some of his later works.

Kanavi completed his schooling in Dharwad and graduated with a Bachelor of Arts degree from Karnatak University in Dharwad in 1952. He followed it with a Master of Arts degree from the same university, studying under the guidance of the then principal, V. K. Gokak, a Jnanpith award winner.

== Career ==
Kanavi started his career in the publication wing of the Karnatak University, Prasaranga, as its secretary and went on to serve the university, between 1956 and 1983, before retiring as the director of its publication wing.

When he moved to Dharwad, he stayed at the Prasada Nilaya, a boarding house of the Murugha Matha, a Lingayat monastery. He was introduced to Kannada language scholars and Hindustani musicians including Mallikarjun Mansur at the monastery. During his time at the monastery he was also introduced to twelfth century Vacanas and other works of Kannada language poets including Raghavanka and Harihara setting him on a path towards Kannada poetry.

Kanavi's career in poetry began in 1949 with his first anthology Kavyaakshi. Poet Da Ra Bendre wrote the preface for this work and stayed a supporter through his career. Kanavi followed it with over 25 anthologies and 28 books across genres. He wrote poetry across all phases of Kannada poetry starting from the Navodaya period (transl. renaissance), Pragatisheela (transl. progressive movement), Navya (transl. modernist movement), and post-Navya periods. For his work he was known as Samanvaya Kavi (transl. the poet of reconciliation) or someone who was a synthesizer of key trends. His poetry spanned genres and themes including nature, friendship, love, places, and even the occasional political poetry focusing on the state of democracy. Many of his works were written as a conversation with time. Kanavi started Kavyanubhava Mantapa (transl. the poetry hall) as an informal association for upcoming poets to recite their poetries and exchange ideas. Some of the other participating poets included Da Ra Bendre and V. K. Gokak. Some of his works were in response to political events of the day. He wrote in opposition to the Indian emergency between 1975 and 1977, and was also a participant of the Gokak movement, a language rights movement that was launched to ensure primacy of the Kannada language in the state.

Through his career he won awards including the Sahitya Akademi Award, Karnataka Sahitya Academy Award, Karnataka Rajyotsava award, and the Pampa Award. He won the Sahitya Akademi award for his poetry anthology Jeeva Dhwani (transl. the sound of life) in 1981.

== Personal life ==
Kanavi was married to Shantadevi Kanavi, also an author who wrote short stories. Kanavi died at SDM Medical Hospital in Dharwad, on 16 February 2022, at the age of 93, from multiple organ dysfunction syndrome, resulting as a complication of COVID-19.

Politicians including the Indian prime minister Narendra Modi and chief minister of Karnataka Basavraj Bommai expressed their condolences.

== Published works ==
=== Poetry ===

- Kavyaakshi
- Bhaavajeevi
- Aakaashabutti
- Madhuchandra
- Shishu Kanda Kanasu
- Nela Mugilu
- Mannina Meravanige
- Deepadhari
- Eradu Dada
- Hombelaku
- Karthikada Moda
- Jeevadhwani
- Hoovu Horaluvavu Sooryana Kadege
- Shishiradalli Banda Snehitha
- Chirantana Daaha
- Samagra Kavya
- Nanna Desha Nanna Jana
- Yeradu Dada
- Nagaradalli Neralu
- Hakkipuccha
- Zinnia
- Inviting Life – Selected Poems in English

=== Prose ===
- Sahitya Chintana
- Kavyanusandhana
- Samahita
- Madhurachenna
- Vachanantharanga
- Shubha Nudiye Hakki
- Sahitya Samahitha
- Samatholana
- Sadbava
- Samagra Gadya Volume - 1
- Samagra Gadya Volume - 2

== Awards and honours ==
- Sahitya Akademi Award for Jeevadhwani
- Karnataka Sahitya Akademi Award
- Rajyotsava Award
- Nrupatunga Award
- Pampa Award
- Maasti Award
- Nadoja Award from Kannada University Humpi
- Honorary Doctorate from Karnataka University Dharwad
- Ambikatanayadatta National Award
