= Naregal, Gadag =

Naregal
- City
- Location in Karnataka, India Naregal (India)
- Coordinates: 15.58°N 75.82°E
- Country: India
- State: Karnataka
- District: Gadag
- Elevation: 628 m (2,060 ft)

Population (2001)
  - Total: 16,652

Languages
  - Official: Kannada
- Time zone: UTC+5:30 (IST)
- PIN: 582119
- Telephone code: 08381

Naregal is a panchayat town in Gadag district in the Indian state of Karnataka. It is about 27 kilometers from Gajendragad and 28 kilometers from Gadag.

== Culture ==
=== Dravidian temple ===
The vimana at the Padmabbarasi Basadi temple is a Dravidian-style shikhara type over the garbhagriha. Its main garbhagriha was meant for a Jina and is square. The other two garbhagrihas are rectangular and have rectangular pedestals from wall-to-wall with twenty four holes, each hole intended to house a Tirthankara sculpture. This became common in the 11th century.

=== Narayana temple ===
Narayana temple at Naregal was built during the period of Krishna III, by Padmabbarasi, the queen of Ganga Permadi Bhutayya in 950 AD. It is the biggest Rashtrakuta temple in Karnataka.

== Demographics ==
As of the 2001 India census, Naregal had a population of 16,652. Males constituted 51%, and females constituted 49%. Naregal had an average literacy rate of 61%, which was higher than the national average of 59.5%. Male literacy was 73%, and female literacy was 49%. 13% of the population was under 6 years of age.

== See also ==
- Kotumachagi
- Gajendragad
- Ron
- Gadag
- Karnataka
