= Shankar Mokashi Punekar =

Indian writer

Shankar Mokashi Punekar (8 May 1928 – 11 August 2004) was a well known writer in the Kannada Language. He was a recipient of the Sahitya Academy award for his novel Avadheshwari. He was considered as one of the major writer in the Modern Kannada Literature. His novel Gangavva Gangamayi was the magnum opus in the history of Kannada Literature. Gangavva Gangamayi, Avadheshwari (Novels), Bilaaskhaan (Story), Maayiya Mooru Mukhagalu (Poem), Sahitya mattu Abhiruchi (Criticism) and Paschyatya Sahitya Vimarshe (Criticism) are major contributions to the Kannada Literature.

== Novels/ಕಾದಂಬರಿಗಳು ==
- Gangavva Gangamayi/ಗಂಗವ್ವ ಗಂಗಾಮಾಯಿ [Translated into all the 14 Indian languages by National Book Trust] (1958)
- Nata-Narayani/ನಟ-ನಾರಾಯಣಿ (1988)
- Avadheswari/ಅವಧೇಶ್ವರಿ [Translated into all the 14 Indian languages by Sahitya Akademi] (1987)

== Short Stories/ಕಥಾಸಂಕಲನ ==
- Derreck D'souza mattu Ithara Kathegalu/ಡೆರೆಕ್ ಡಿಸೇೂಜಾ ಮತ್ತು ಇತರ ಕತೆಗಳು (1990)

== Poetry/ಕಾವ್ಯ ==
- Maayiya Mooru Mukhagalu/ಮಾಯಿಯ ಮೂರು ಮುಖಗಳು (1970)

== Drama/ನಾಟಕ ==
- Viparyasa Vinoda/ವಿಪರ್ಯಾಸ ವಿನೇೂದ (1988)

== Criticism/ವಿಮರ್ಶೆ ==
- Bendre Kavyamimamse/ಬೇಂದ್ರೆ ಕಾವ್ಯಮೀಮಾಂಸೆ (1964)
- Sahitya mattu Abhiruchi/ಸಾಹಿತ್ಯ ಮತ್ತು ಅಭಿರುಚಿ (1982)
- Apoorna Varthamanakala/ಅಪೂರ್ಣ ವರ್ತಮಾನಕಾಲ (1995)
- Neera Belagu/ನೀರ ಬೆಳಗು (2006)
- Paschathya Sahitya Vimarshe/ಪಾಶ್ಚಾತ್ಯ ಸಾಹಿತ್ಯ ವಿಮರ್ಶೆ (1976)

== Complete Works/ಸಮಗ್ರ ಸಾಹಿತ್ಯ ==
- Mahati/ಮಹತಿ [Criticism on Western

Literature]

- Susandhi/ಸುಸಂಧಿ [Poetry, Short stories and Drama]
- Kadambari Trivali/ಕಾದಂಬರಿ ತ್ರಿವಳಿ [Gangavva Gangamayi, Nata-Narayani and Avadheswari]
- Vastu Vinyasa/ವಸ್ತು ವಿನ್ಯಾಸ [Criticism on Kannada Literature]

== English Works ==
Poetry

- The Captive (1965)
- The Pretender (1968)
- Tent Pole (1984)
- Parodigms (1991)

Criticism

- Indo Anglian Creed (1972)
- An Epistle to Professor David McCuttion (1972)
- P. Lal : An Appreciation (1968)
- V. K. Gokak (1975)
- Studies in Indo-English Literature (1980)
- Compulsory Capitalisation Scheme (1982)
- Mohanjodaro Seals (1984)
- B. Puttaswamayya (1989)
- Harijan Contribution to Mediaeval Indian Thought (1991)
- Chomsky-Skinner Experimental Method in English Language Teaching (1995)
- Jnanapitha Laureates of Karnataka

== Translations ==
- The Cycle of Seasons [Rutusamhara rendered into Poetry] (1966)
- Avadhoota Gita (1980)
- Sri Ramayana Darshanam [Translation of Kannada Epic by Kuvempu] (2000)

Novel

- Nana's Confession [English Translation of His Novel Nata-Narayani] (1992)

== About Him/His Literature ==
- Gandha Koradu/ಗಂಧ ಕೊರಡು - ಅಭಿನಂದನ ಗ್ರಂಥ (Kannada)
- Sandalwood - A Felicitation Volume (English)
- Shankar Mokashi Punekar - G. N. Upadhya/ಶಂಕರ ಮೊಕಾಶಿ ಪುಣೇಕರ್ - ಜಿ.ಎನ್.ಉಪಾಧ್ಯ (Kannada)

== Movies ==
- Gangavva Gangamayi/ಗಂಗವ್ವ ಗಂಗಾಮಾಯಿ (1994)

== Awards ==
- Karnataka Sahitya Akademi Award for "Paschyatya Sahithya Vimarshe" (1976)
- Karnataka Sahitya Akademi Special Award for "Sahitya mattu Abhiruchi" (1982)
- Karnataka Sahitya Akademi Honorary Award for Lifetime Achievement (1984)
- Kendra Sahitya Akademi Award for "Avadeshwari" (1988)
- Sudha Magazine Award for "Nata-Narayani" (1981)
- Karnataka Vidyavardhaka Sangha Award for "Jnanapitha Laureates of Karnataka"
- Karnataka State Film Award for Best Story 1994-95 for "Gangavva Gangamayi"
