= Prabhulingaleele =

Poem

Prabhulingaleele is an epic poem written by Indian Virashaiva poet Chamarasa in the shatpadi metre. The book narrates the life story of the saint and poet Allama Prabhu. This poem and its subject influenced the 20th-century philosopher Ramana Maharshi.
