= Naregal, Haveri =

Naregal is a village in Haveri district Karnataka, India with a population of over 7,000. It is in Hangal Taluk. The village is an agricultural village known for the production of coconut, Maize, and jawar.
