= Gajendragad =

Gajendragada Gajendragad
- Town and Taluk
- Gajendragada
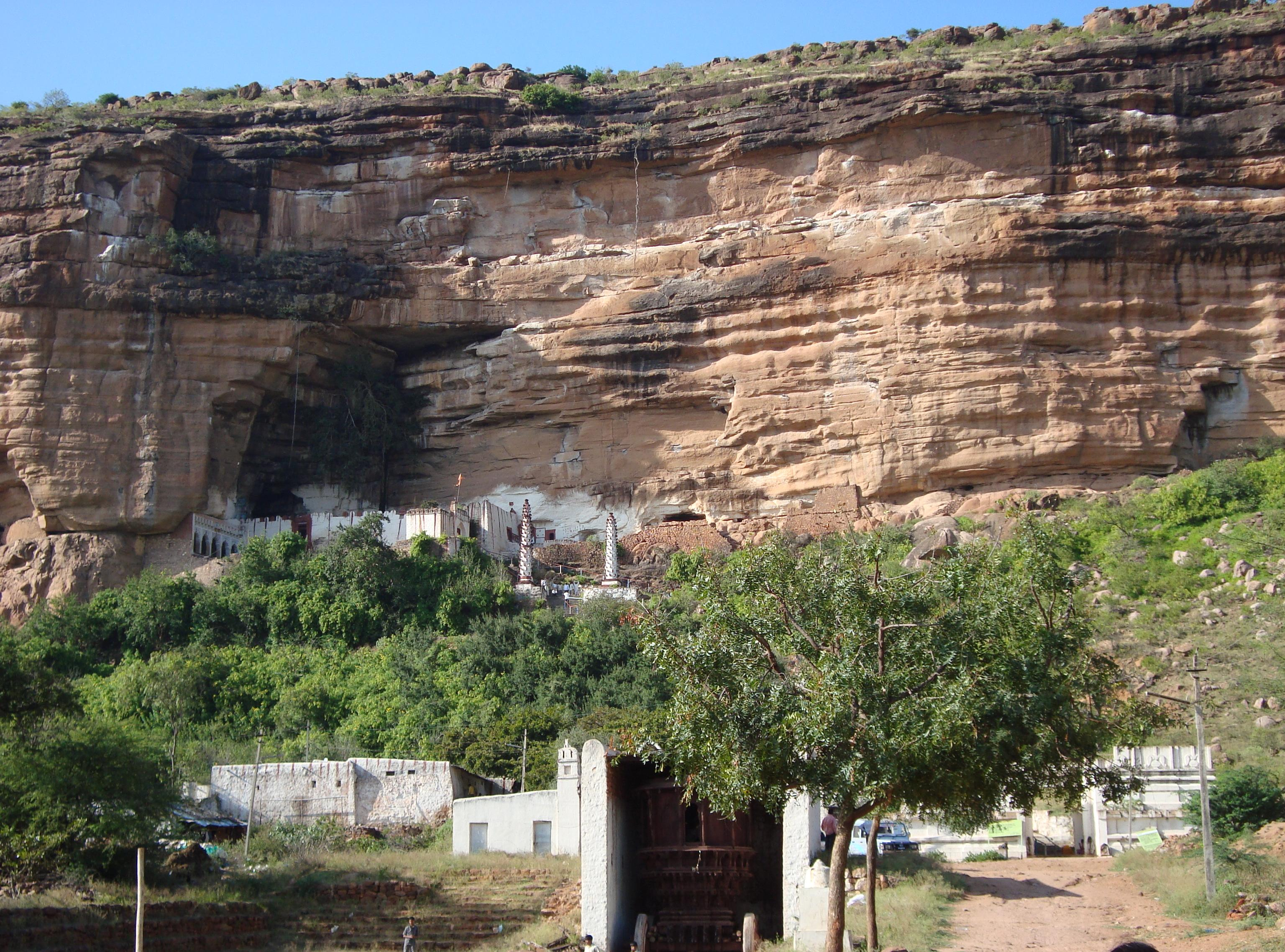
- Kalakaleshwara Temple at Gajendragad.
- Nickname: Gada
- Location in Karnataka, India Gajendragada (India)
- Coordinates: 15.73°N 75.98°E
- Country: India
- State: Karnataka
- District: Gadag
- Taluk: Gajendragad
- Lok Sabha Constituency: Haveri
- Named for: Hill Station

Government
  - Type: Municipal Council
  - Body: Gajendragad Town Municipal Council
- Elevation: 643 m (2,110 ft)

Population (2011)
  - Total: 32,359

Languages
  - Official: Kannada
- Time zone: UTC+5:30 (IST)
- Postal code: 582114
- Vehicle registration: KA 26
- Website: gajendragadatown.mrc.gov.in

Gajendragad (also called Gajendragada) is a Town Municipal Council city in Gadag district, Karnataka, India, with population of 32,359 as of 2011 Census data. It has an average elevation of 643 metres (2109 feet). It is about 55 kilometers from the district headquarters Gadag, 110 kilometers from Hubli, 200 kilometers from Belgaum, and 450 kilometers from state capital Bangalore. The name Gajendragad is derives from the Sanskrit words for elephant (gaja) and a fort. Local people generally call it Gada. Gajendragad is a pilgrimage destination due to its Kalakaleshwara temple.

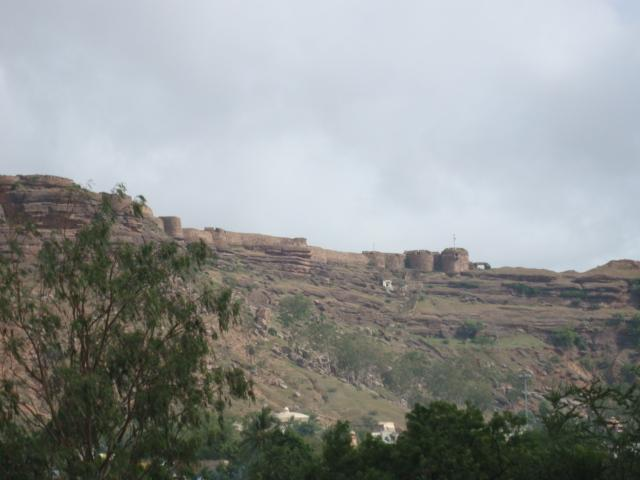
Gajendragad Fort

== History ==
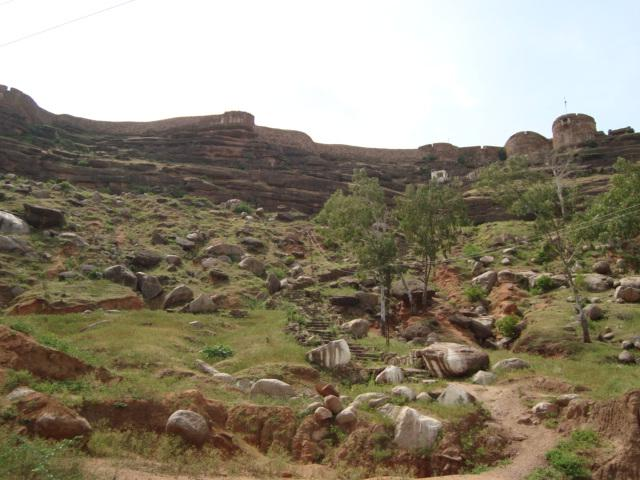
Gajendragad Fort

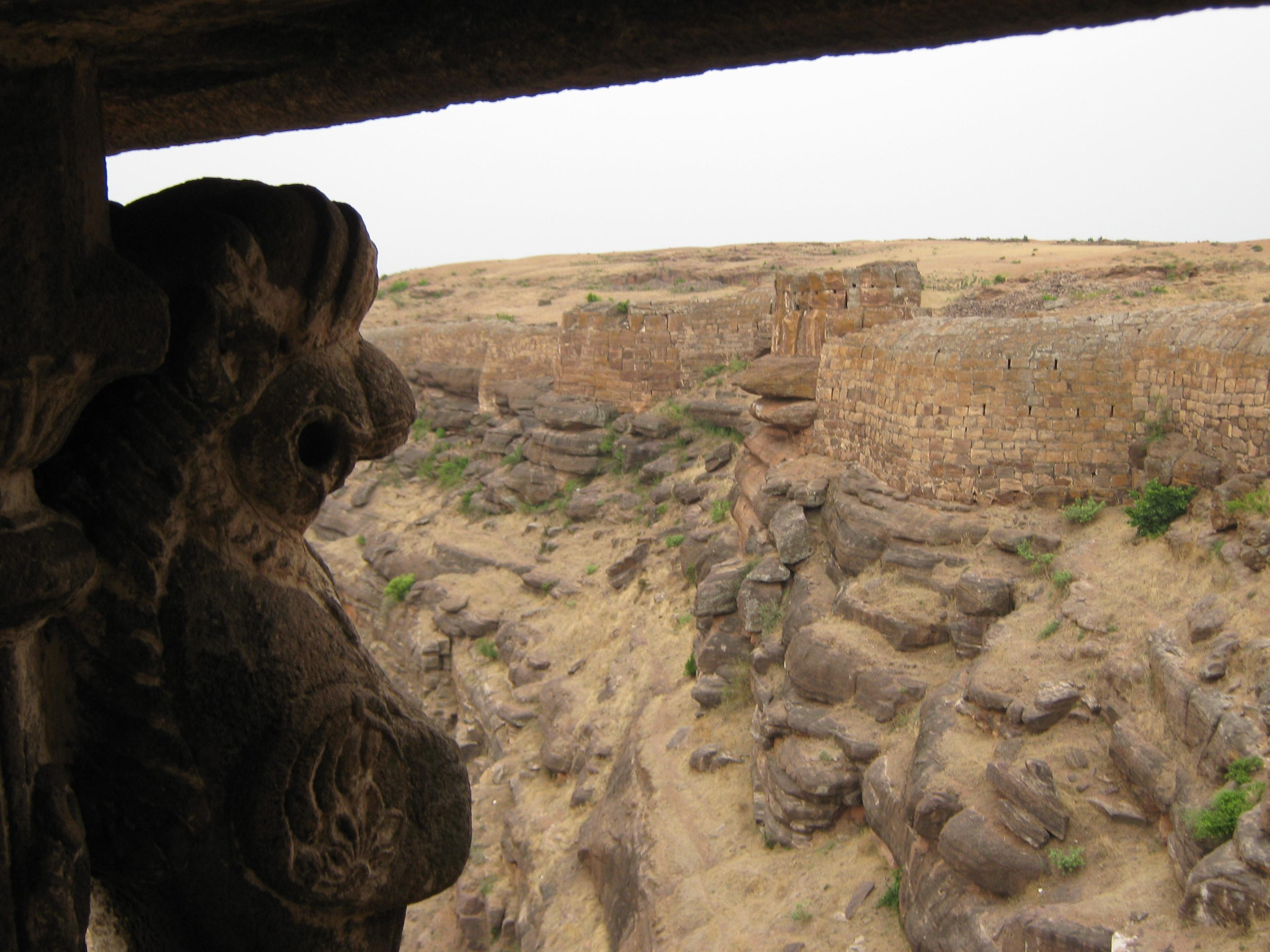
Gajendragad Fort

Gajendragad is surrounded by the historical places associated with Badami Chalukyas and Western Chalukya and the places are Badami, Aihole, Pattadakal, Mahakuta, Banashankari, Sudi, Mahadeva Temple at Itagi and Kudalasangama. Rastrakuta Monuments at Kuknur. The Gajendragad fort and town were built and renewed by Shivaji.

=== Ghorpade ===
The founder of the Ghorpade family was Valabhasinh Cholaraj Ghorpade and then the descended Bahirjirao Ghorpade.

The Royal families of Kapsi and Gajendragad owe their origin to Vallabhasinha and the Chiefs of Sondur are descended from the third son of Cholraj.

=== Treaty of Gajendragad ===
After the Second Mysore War, Tippu Sultan had to engage in an armed conflict (during 1786–87) with the Marathas and the Nizam. The war concluded with the treaty of Gajendragad. Tipu Sultan ceded Badami to the Marathas.

Tippu Sultan would release Kalopant and return Adoni, Kittur, and Nargund to their previous rulers. Badami would be ceded to the Marathas. Tippu Sultan would also pay an annual tribute of 12 lakhs per year to the Marathas. In return, Tippu Sultan would get all the places that they had captured in the war, including Gajendragarh and Dharwar. Tipu would also be addressed by the Marathas by an honorary title of "Nabob Tipu Sultan Futteh Ally Khan".

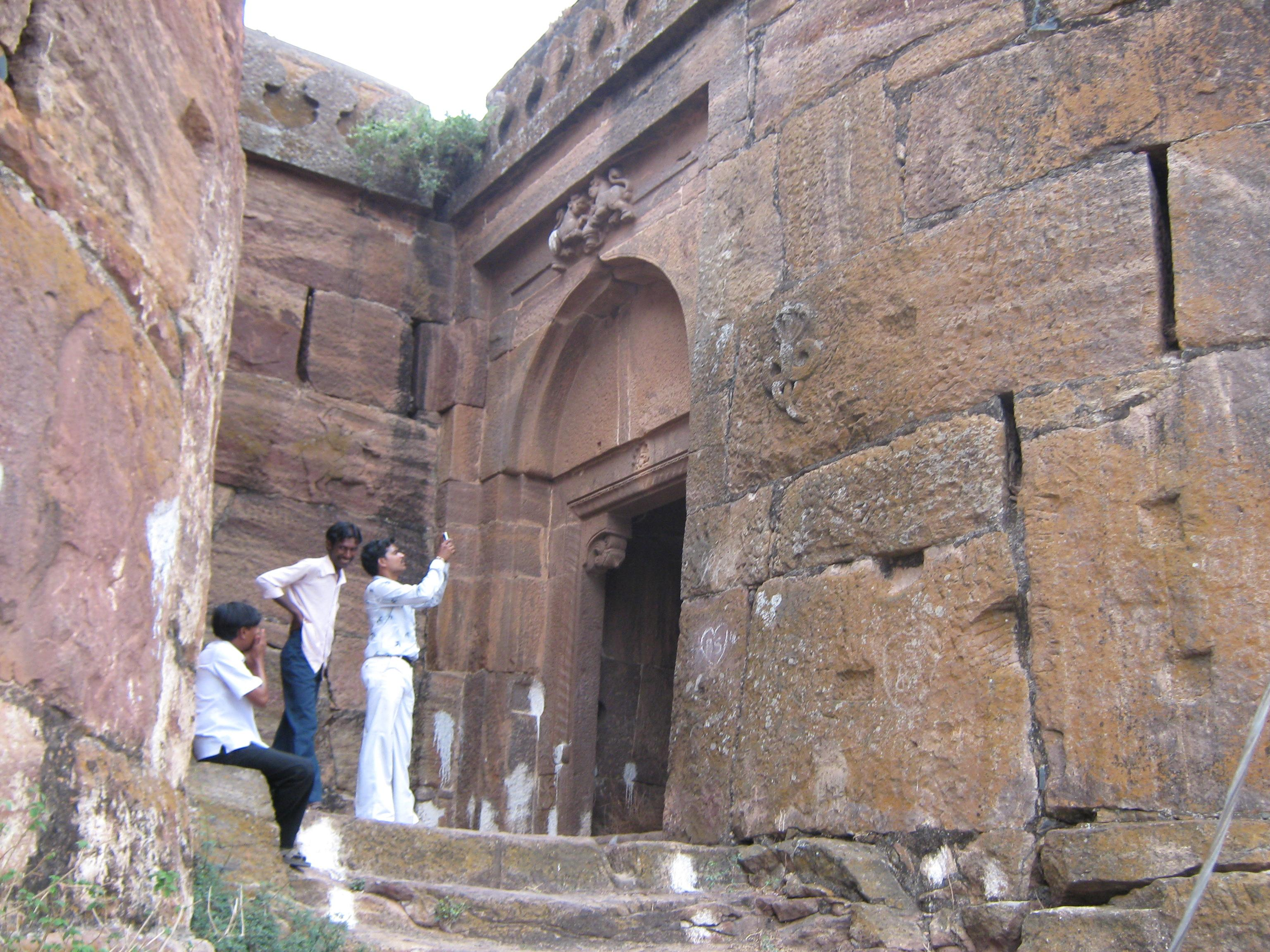
Gajendragad Fort

== Kalakaleshwara temple ==
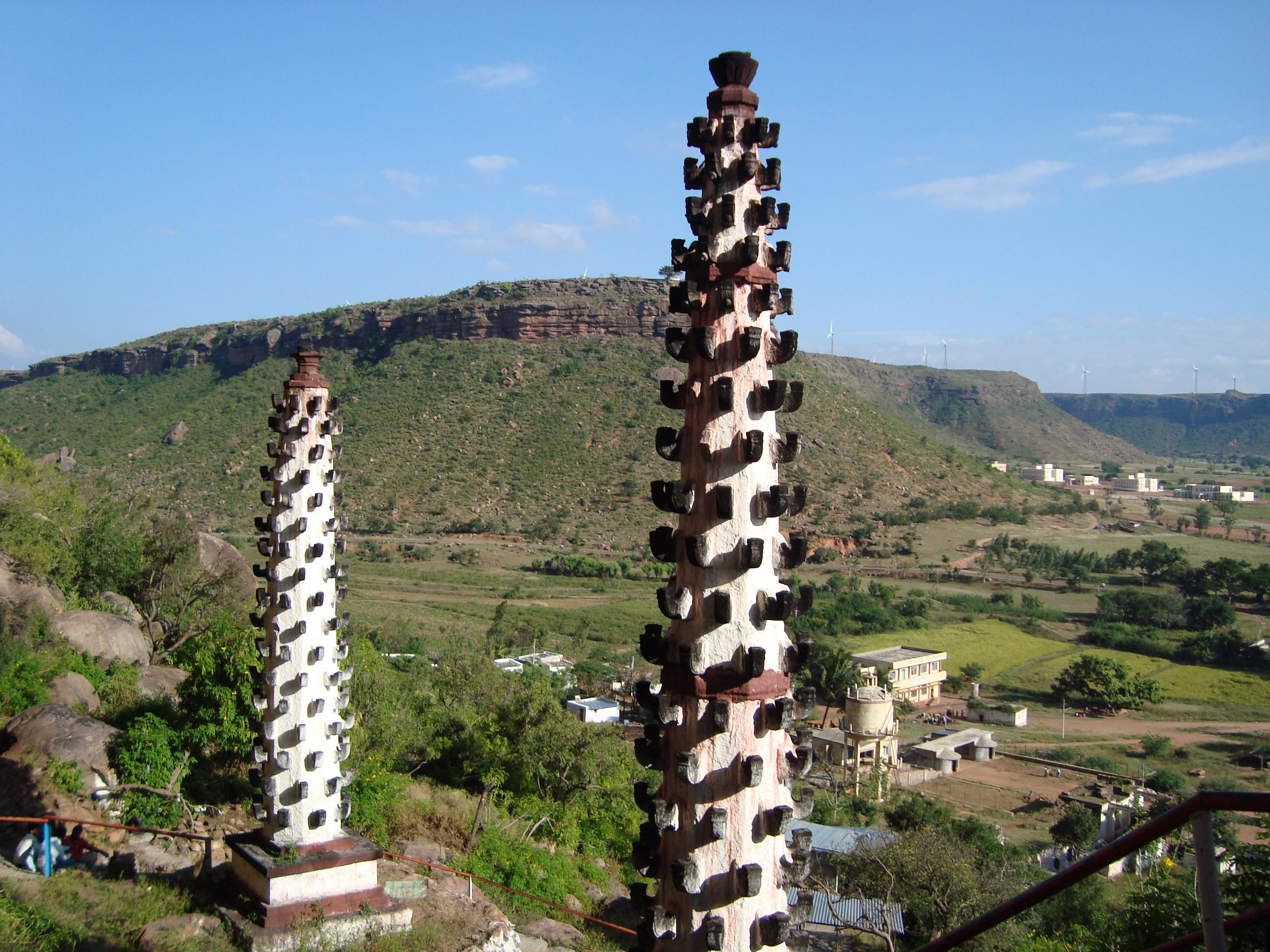
Nature in front of Kalkaleshwara Temple, Gajendragad, Karnataka

A little known pilgrim of North Karnataka. Gajendragad is a Town Municipal Council lying amidst hills, in one of which is encapsulated Kalakaleshwara temple of Lord Shiva (known as Dakshina Kashi), who is worshipped in the form of Kalakaleshwara. Large steps lead up to the temple. It is a traditional temple with Udbhava Linga. There we can find God Veerabhadra temple also in the same premises. Just outside the temple exit is a small square water reservoir called AntharaGange. It is an evergreen water resource that constantly falls along the roots of Peepal tree into the pond all throughout the year. It is said to be flowing even in the peaks of summer season and has an unknown root.

=== Mythology ===
Every year, on the night of Ugadi, New Year of Kannadigas, the pandit or pujari of the temple prepares a solution of limestone and leaves it with a brush and a hookah inside the temple. According to legend, when people wake the next morning, the temple has been painted on its own and the hookah appears to have been used.

== MMTC's wind farm ==
Minerals & Metals Trading Corporation (MMTC) Limited under the ministry of commerce and industry. MMTC's Gajendragad plant started in 2007, the plant has delivered electricity power of over 102 million units to Hubli Electricity Supply Company (HESCOM) Limited. The plant generate a total capacity of 15 MW of power, with 25 wind energy generators that each can generate 600 KV.

=== Environmental issues ===
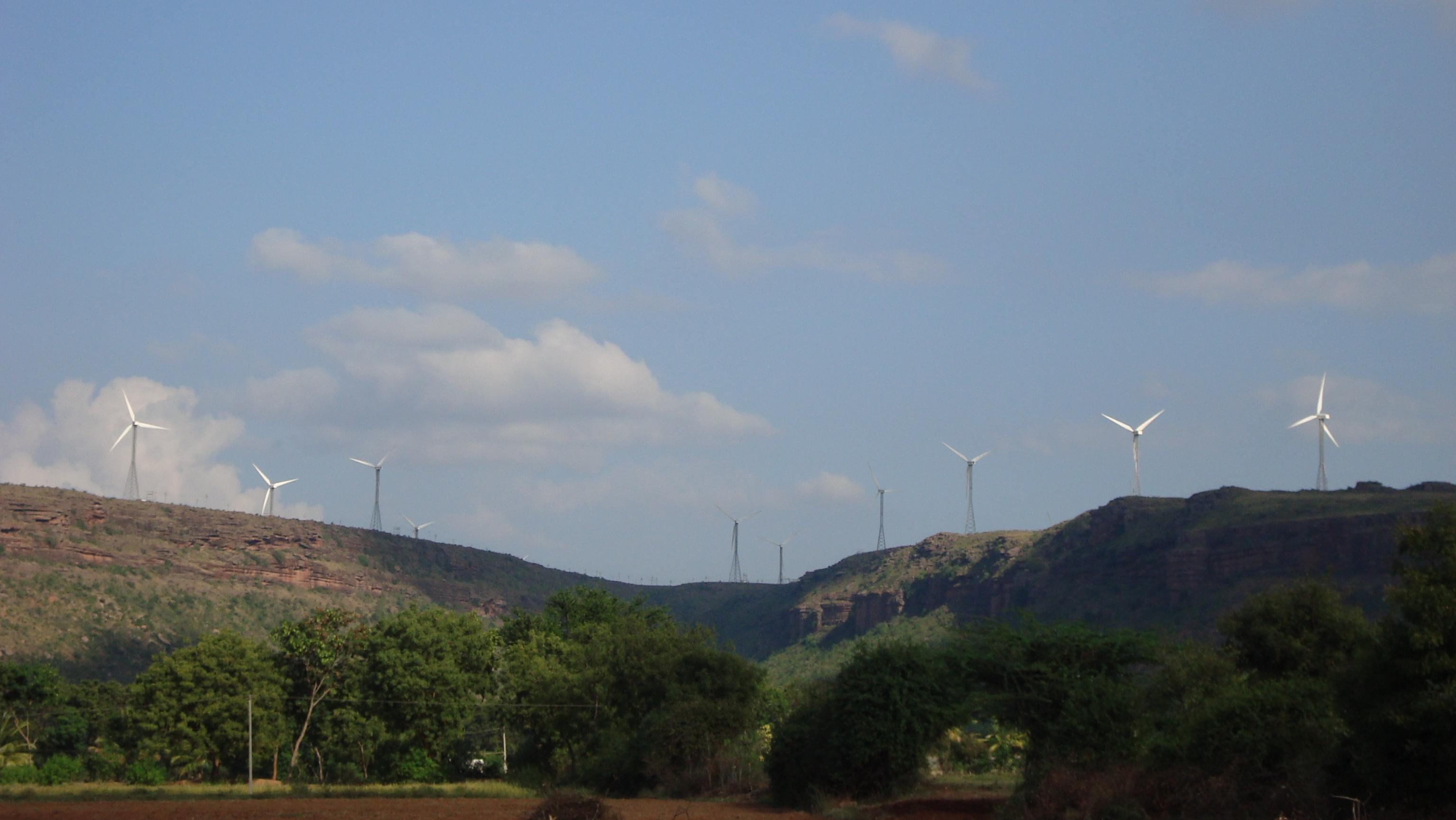
Windmills in front of Kalkaleshwara Temple, Gajendragad, Karnataka

Windmills pose an environmental threat to endangered species like the Indian grey wolf and striped hyenas at Gajendragad. The noise and human traffic associated with windmills has driven some wolves and hyenas away from their former habitat.

== Demographics ==
As of 2011 India census Gajendragad is a Town Municipal Council city in district of Gadag, Karnataka. The Gajendragad city is divided into 23 wards for which elections are held every 5 years. The Gajendragad Town Municipal Council has population of 32,359 of which 16,198 are males while 16,161 are females as per report released by Census India 2011.

The population of children aged 0–6 is 4418 which is 13.65% of total population of Gajendragad (TMC). In Gajendragad Town Municipal Council, the female sex ratio is 998 against state average of 973. Moreover, the child sex ratio in Gajendragad is around 921 compared to Karnataka state average of 948. The literacy rate of Gajendragad city is 79.49% higher than the state average of 75.36%. In Gajendragad, male literacy is around 89.33% while the female literacy rate is 69.74%.

Gajendragad Town Municipal Council has total administration over 6,235 houses to which it supplies basic amenities like water and sewerage. It is also authorize to build roads within Town Municipal Council limits and impose taxes on properties coming under its jurisdiction.

=== Gajendragad 2022 - 2023 Population ===
Current estimated population of Gajendragad Town Municipal Council in 2023 is approximately 44,000. The schedule census of 2021 for Gajendragad city is postponed due to covid. We believe new population census for Gajendragad city will be conducted in 2023 and same will be updated once its done. The current data for Gajendragad town are estimated only but all 2011 figures are accurate.

== Notable people ==
- Raghavendra Acharya - scholar in Vedanta, Vyakarana (Grammar), Nyaya (Law), Mimamsa and Alankar, lived in Gajendragad
- Prahlad Balacharya Gajendragadkar - served as the Chief Justice of India from 1964 to 1966, was native to Gajendragada.

== Gallery ==
Photo Gallery
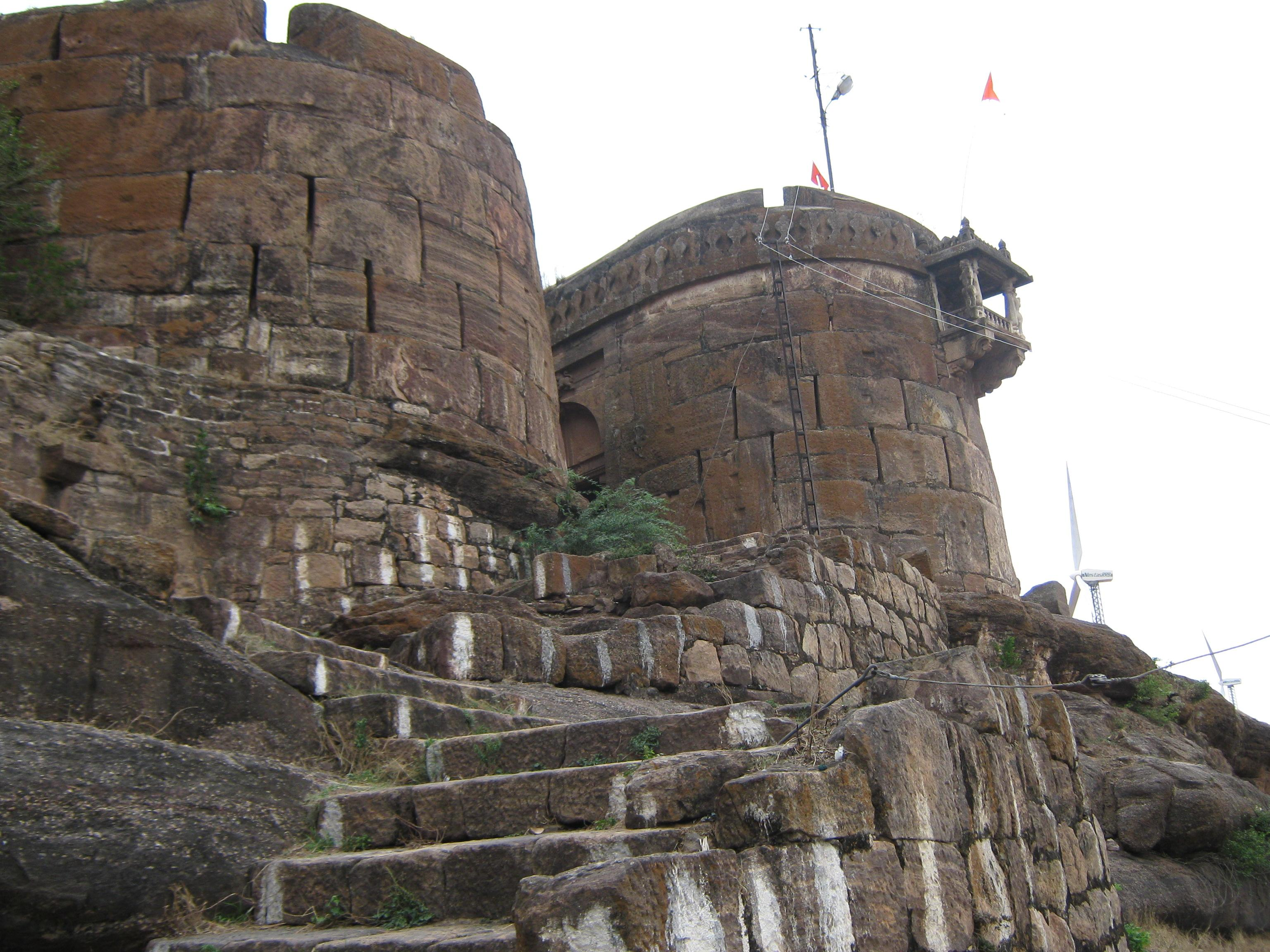
Gajendragad Fort

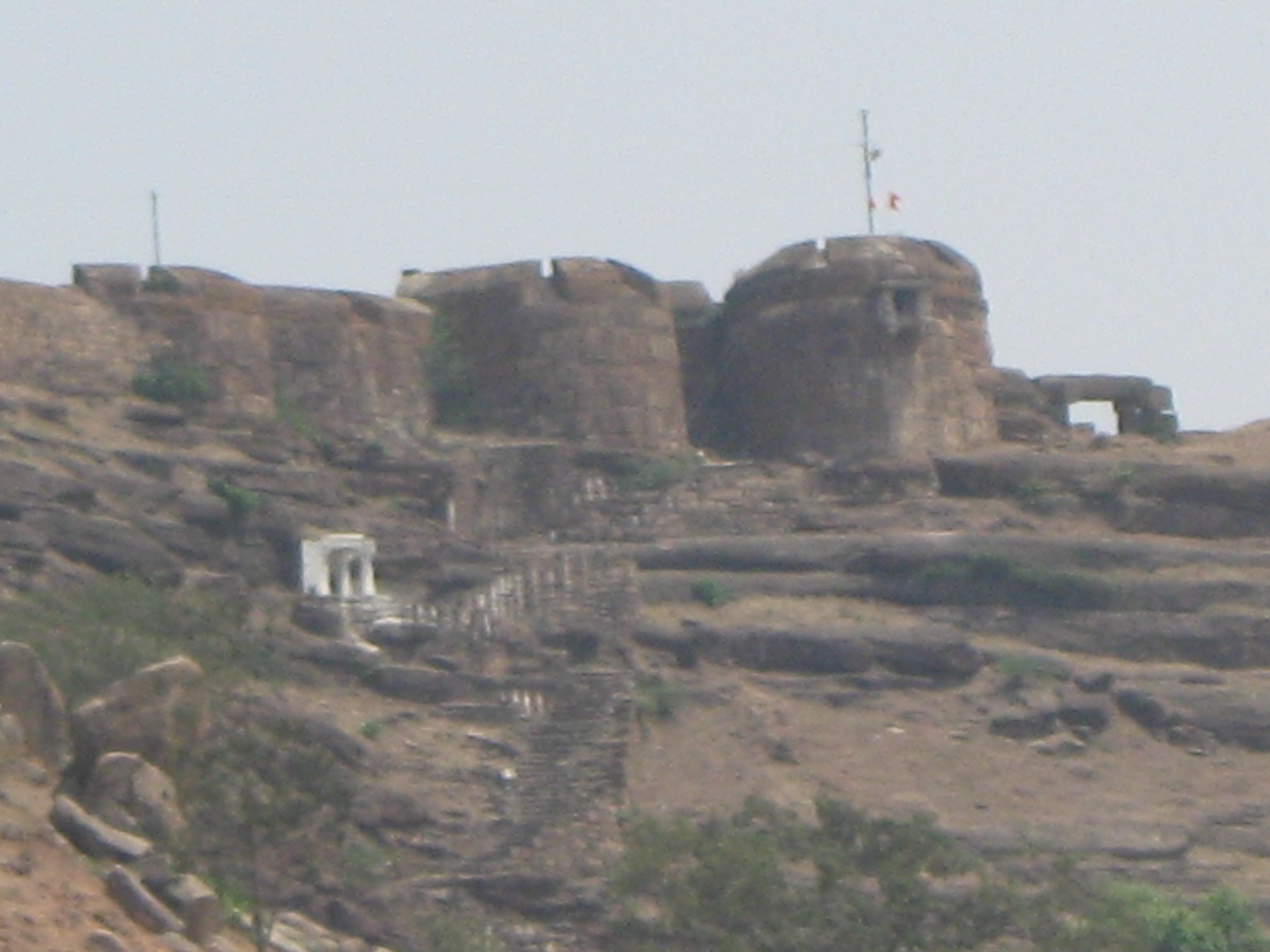
Gajendragad Fort

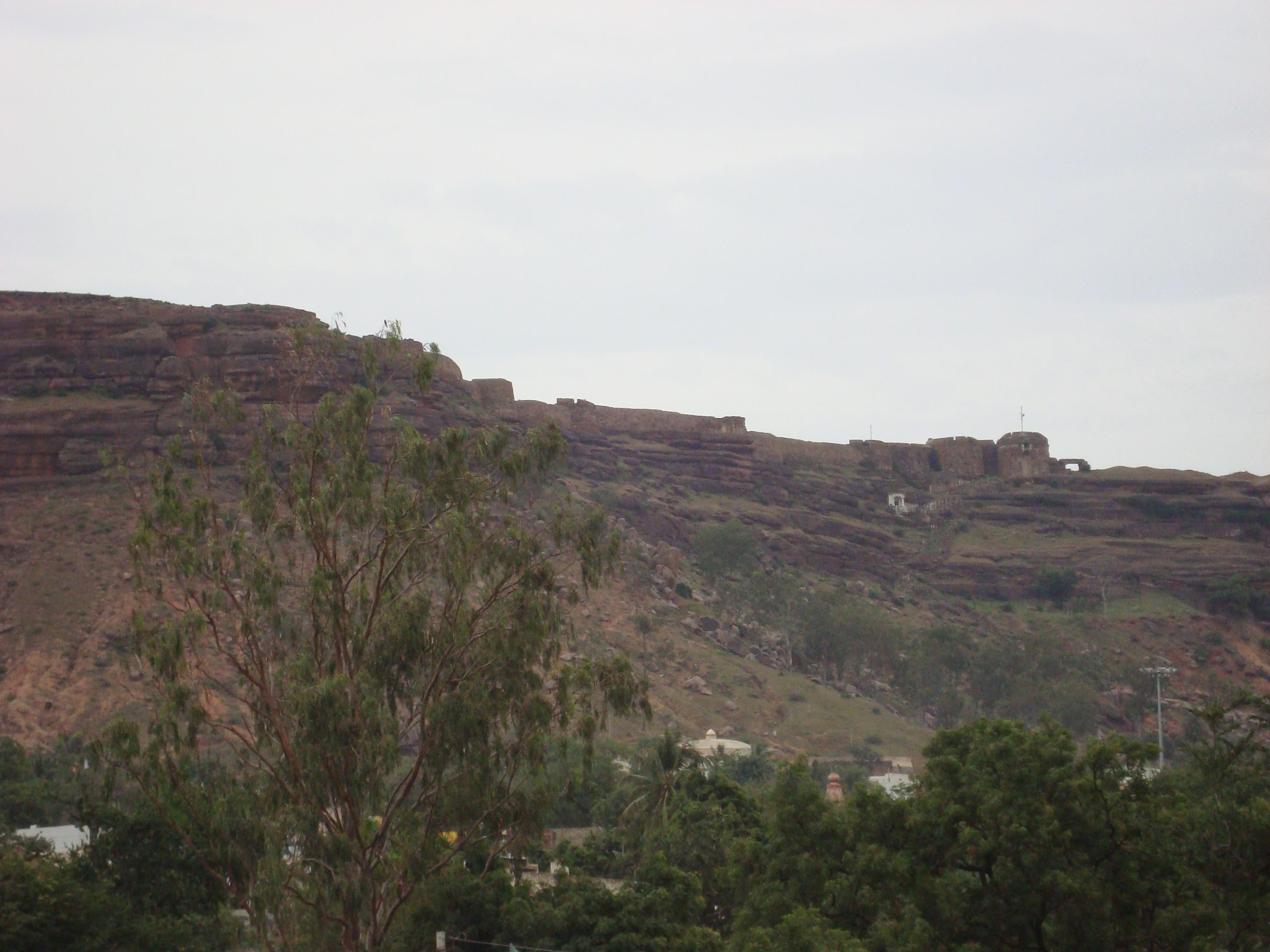
Gajendragad Fort

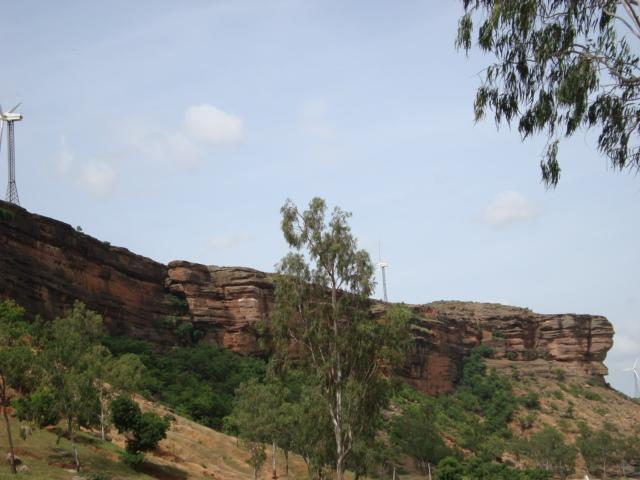
Gajendragad Hill

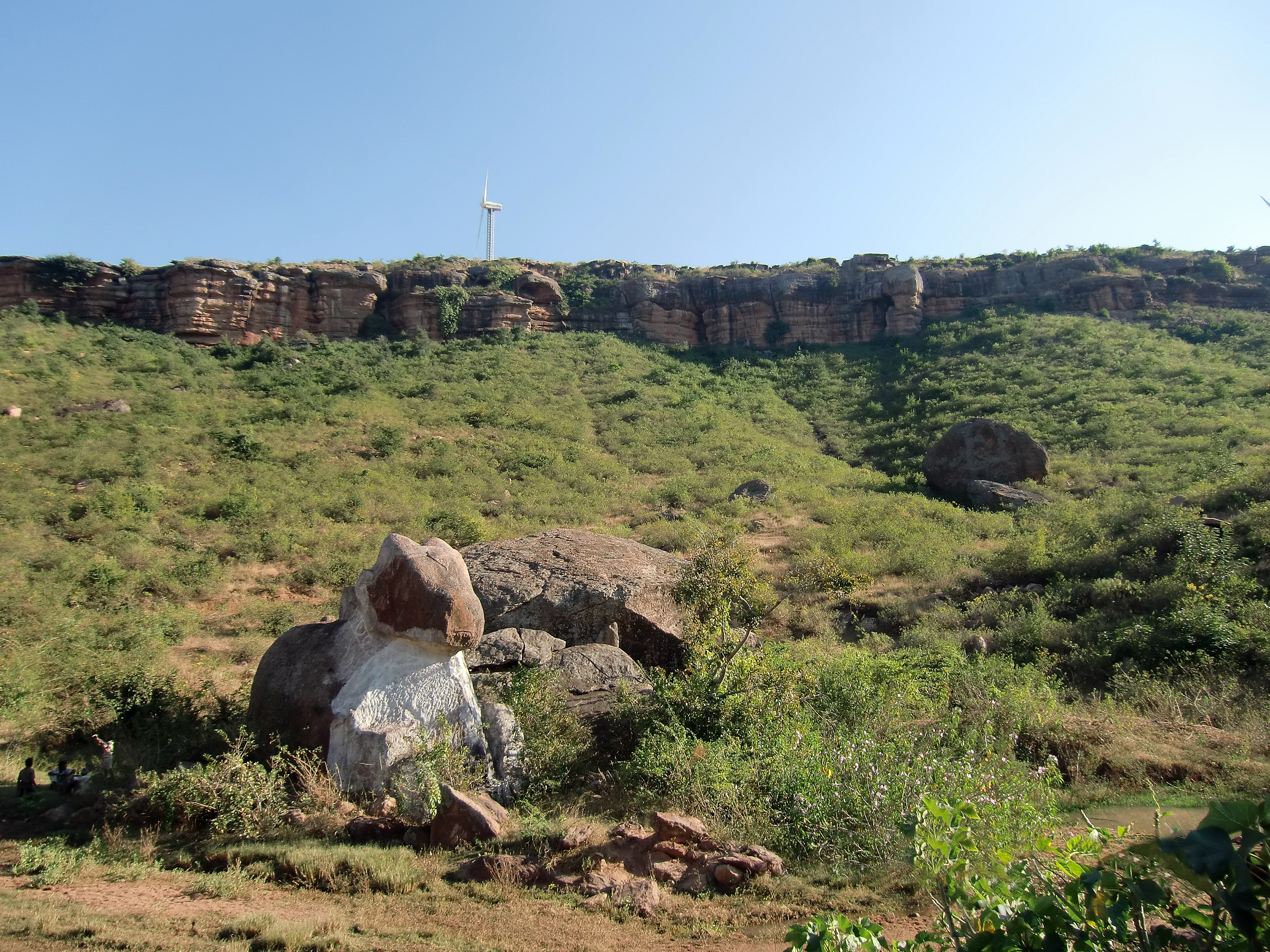
Incomplete Nandi at Gajendragad near Kalkaleshwara temple

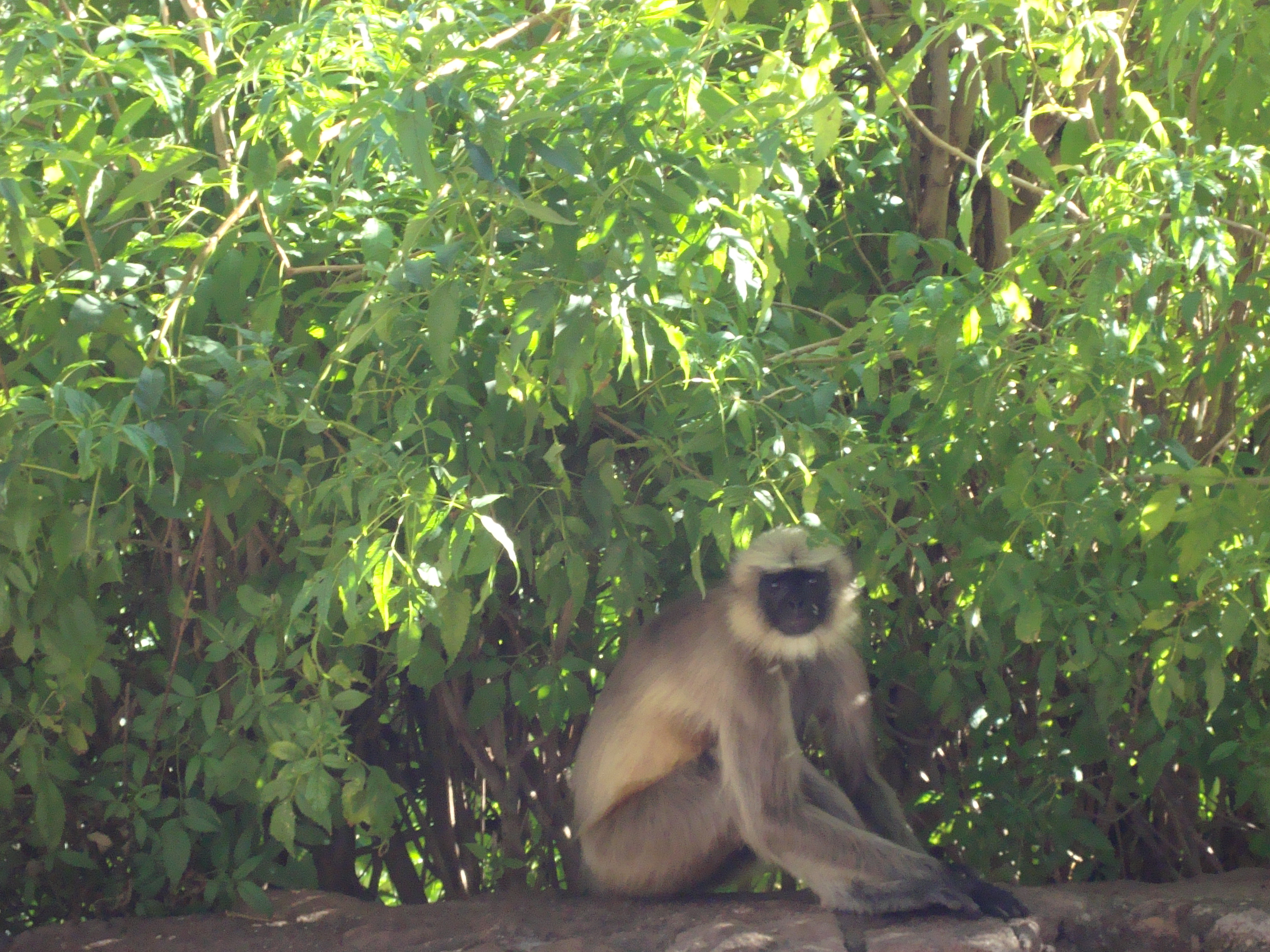
Black-footed Gray Langur at Gajendragad

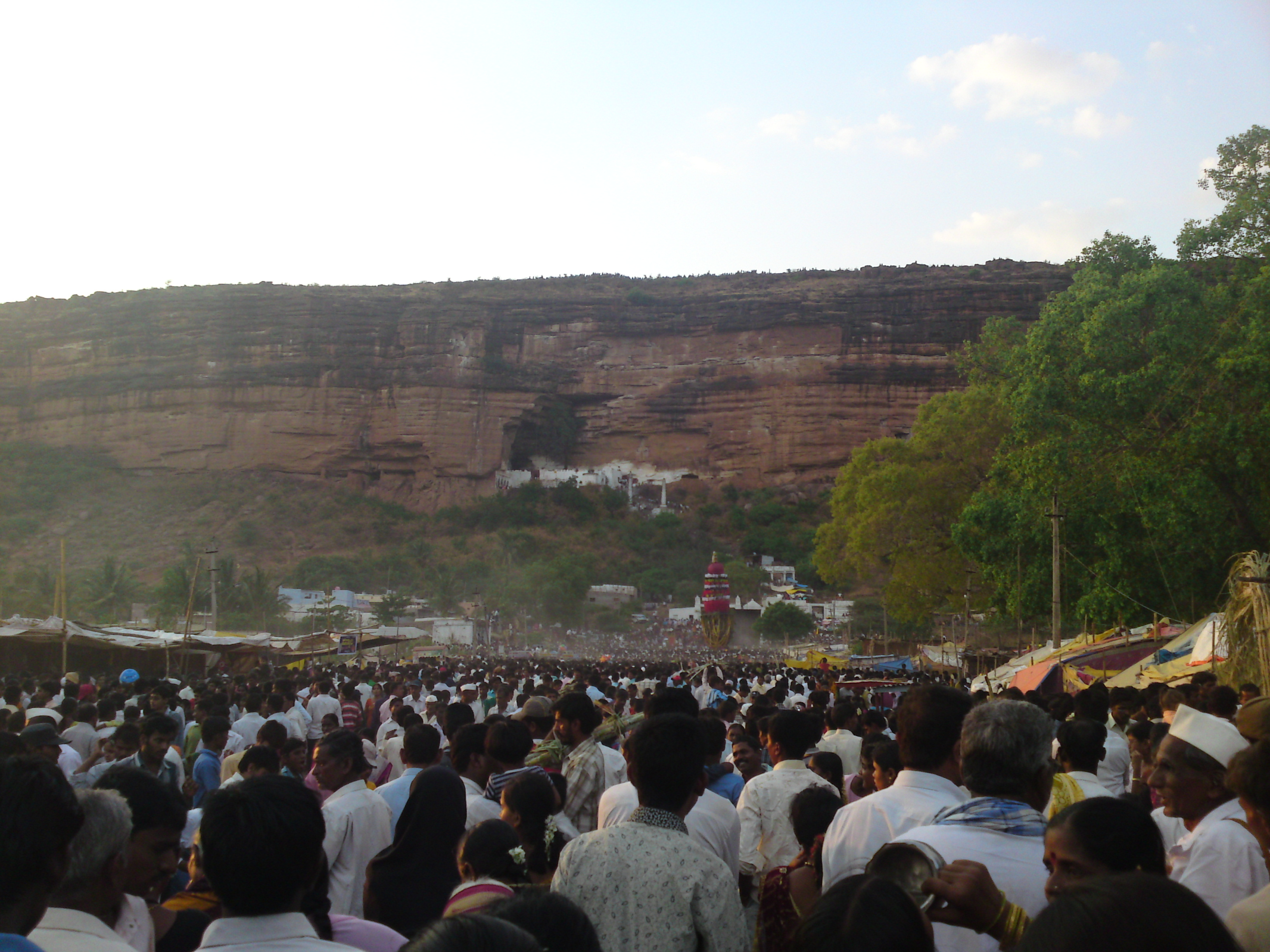
Chariot festival at Kalakaleshwara Gajendragad

== See also ==
- Ghorpade
- Sandur (princely state)
- Mudhol State
- Gooty
- North Karnataka
- Tourism in North Karnataka
- Badami, Pattadakal, Aihole, Mahakuta
- Kuknur
- Mahadeva Temple (Itagi)
- Sudi
- Gadag District
- Mudhol Hound
