= Chamarasa =

Indian poet

Chamarasa (c. 1425) was a 15th century Virashaiva poet in the Kannada language, during the reign of Vijayanagar Empire, a powerful empire in Southern India during 14th - 16th centuries. A contemporary and competitor to a noted Brahmin Kannada poet Kumara Vyasa, Chamarasa was patronised by King Deva Raya II. The work is in 25 chapters (gatis) comprising 1111 six-line verses (arupadi).

== Magnum Opus ==
His magnum opus, "Prabhulinga Leele", written in 1430 AD, described Allama Prabhu as an early apostle of Veerashaivism and an incarnation of the god Shiva. Chamarasa and other noted Kannada writers such as Lakkanna Dandesa and Jakkanarya flourished under the patronage of King Deva Raya II. Chamarasa was a champion of the Veerashaiva faith and was a rival of Kumara Vyasa in the king's court. His Prabhulinga Lile, written in the native Bhamini Shatpadi metrical composition form (six line verse or hexa-metre) was a eulogy of 12th-century saint Allama Prabhu. So popular was the writing with the King that he had it translated into Telugu and Tamil languages, and later into the Sanskrit and Marathi languages as well. In the story, the saint is considered an incarnation of the Hindu god Ganapathi while Parvati took the form of a princess of Banavasi. While Kumara Vyasa's epic is war-torn (Kumara Vyasa Bharata, his version of the Hindu epic Mahabharata), Chamarasa writing was full of Yoga and vairagya (renunciation). The book includes details of the journey undertaken by Allama Prabhu en route to Basavakalyana, his interaction with notable Veerashaiva mystics including Basavanna, Akka Mahadevi, Gorakhnatha, Muktayakka and Siddharama. Interesting details include how Allama avoided the temptation of Mayadevi who tried to seduce him, and how Animisha became his guru. While these personalities are all real, it is possible they also represent human qualities narrated in a "parallel allegorical story". Competition between the two powerful faiths, Veerashaivism and Vaishnavism was intense during this period. This is evident by a remark made by the poet in the writing. Chamarasa claims that his story is "not about ordinary dead mortals", implying that the Vaishnava epics (the Ramayana and the Mahabharata) were about mere mortals.
