= Hombal =

Hombal Hombala
- Village
- Location in Karnataka, India Hombal (India)
- Coordinates: 15°30′59″N 75°33′20″E
- Country: India
- State: Karnataka
- District: Gadag District
- Taluk: Gadag
- Lok Sabha Constituency: Haveri

Population (2016)
  - Total: 15,000+

Languages
  - Official: Kannada
- Time zone: UTC+5:30 (IST)
- Postal code: 582204
- Vehicle registration: KA 26

Hombal is a village in the southern state of Karnataka, India. It is located in the Gadag taluk of Gadag district.

== Education ==
Hombal has several co-educational schools for both genders. Most are government-run, they are the government Urdu Higher Primary School, which provides the standard first to eighth grades and a co-ed high school. There is also the Government High school, the Government ITI College by DGET, there are Mailarling government schools on Gadag Homabal road, and the co-ed Rani Chennamma primary school at Station Road. However, the local Shri Shankarling Secondary and Higher Secondary School are run by private organizations and are named after the nearby Shri Shankarling Temple.

== Infrastructure ==
The inner road system in Hombal resembles other rural cities with concrete roads. While serviceable, the roads can certainly be improved. Since September 2015, this road system has been connected with the State Highway 45 (Challakere-Arabhavi State Highway), which connects to the expansive state highway system all across India.

== Economy ==
Men are mostly involved in agriculture and are heavily dependent on rainfall for their yield.

Hombal village is the hometown of several notable people such as singer Bharat Ratna Pandit Bhimsen Joshi, poet Nadoj Shree Channaveera Kanavi, cricketer Sunil Joshi, and writer G. B. Joshi (Jadabharat). and Bharat Natyam Exponent Shankar Hombal (Bhopal). Other notable persons from Hombal include G.S. Kulkarni (general surgeon), Hindu (Advaita) scholars Shankarbhat Agnihotri and Devarao Kulkarni, stonemason Shri Shankar Shilpi Pattar and the pujari Shri Shankrappa Pattar

== Demographics ==
According to the 2001 India census, Hombal had a population of 7,860. 3,964 males and 3,896 females.

== Points of interest ==
Hombal is famous for the ancient Shankaralinga temple located in the village. Other noteworthy temples in the village include Neelakhant, Brahmachaitanya Paduka, Durga, Yoginarayan, Anjaneya, and Golavi.

== See also ==
- Gadag
- Districts of Karnataka
- Chennaveera Kanavi
- Bhimsen Joshi
