= Shirahatti =

- Town
- Location in Karnataka, India Shirahatti (India)
- Coordinates: 15.23°N 75.58°E
- Country: India
- State: Karnataka
- District: Gadag
- Taluk: Shirahatti
- Lok Sabha Constituency: Haveri
- Elevation: 659 m (2,162 ft)

Population (2001)
  - Total: 16,208

Languages
  - Official: Kannada
- Time zone: UTC+5:30 (IST)
- PIN: 582 120
- Vehicle registration: KA-26

Shirahatti is a panchayat town in Gadag district in the Indian state of Karnataka.

== Geography ==
Shirahatti is located at 15.23°N 75.58°E. It has an average elevation of 659 metres (2162 feet).

== Demographics ==
As of 2001 India census, Shirahatti had a population of 16,208. Males constitute 51% of the population and females 49%. Shirahatti has an average literacy rate of 60%, higher than the national average of 59.5%: male literacy is 69%, and female literacy is 50%. 13% of the population is under 6 years of age.

== Places to visit ==
Shri Jagadguru Fakireshwar Math (Temple) is a famous religious center. Both Hindus and Muslims follow this deity.

== Transport ==
Shirahatti has a dedicated road service to the neighboring districts and towns, the nearest large town being Gadag. Bus services are available to Hubli, Lakshmeshwara, Mundargi, Ron, on a very regular basis. Bus services are also available to Bangalore regularly. No train services are available, but the nearest railway station is Lakshameshwar (Yelavigi).
