= Gadag district =

- District of Karnataka
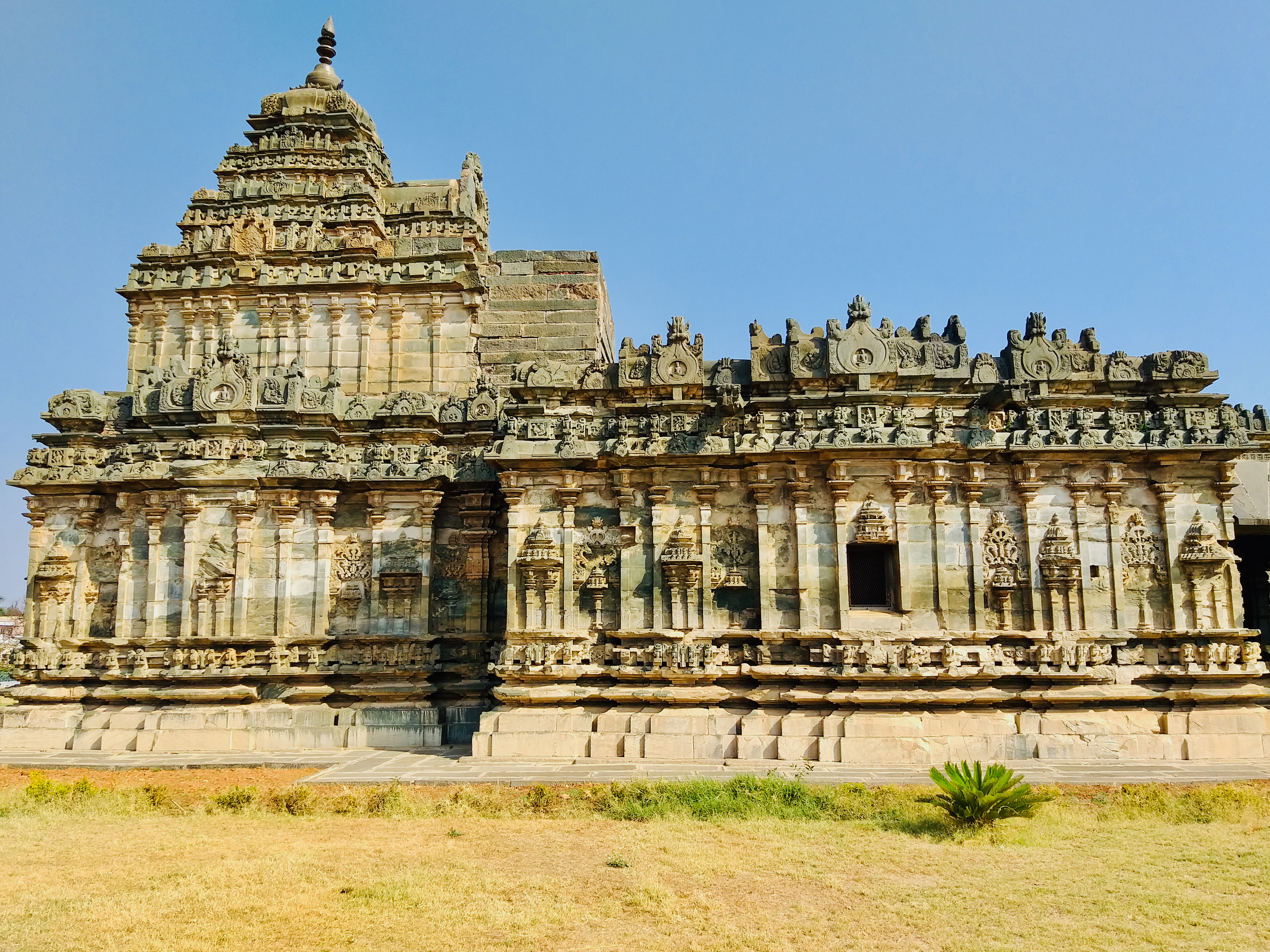
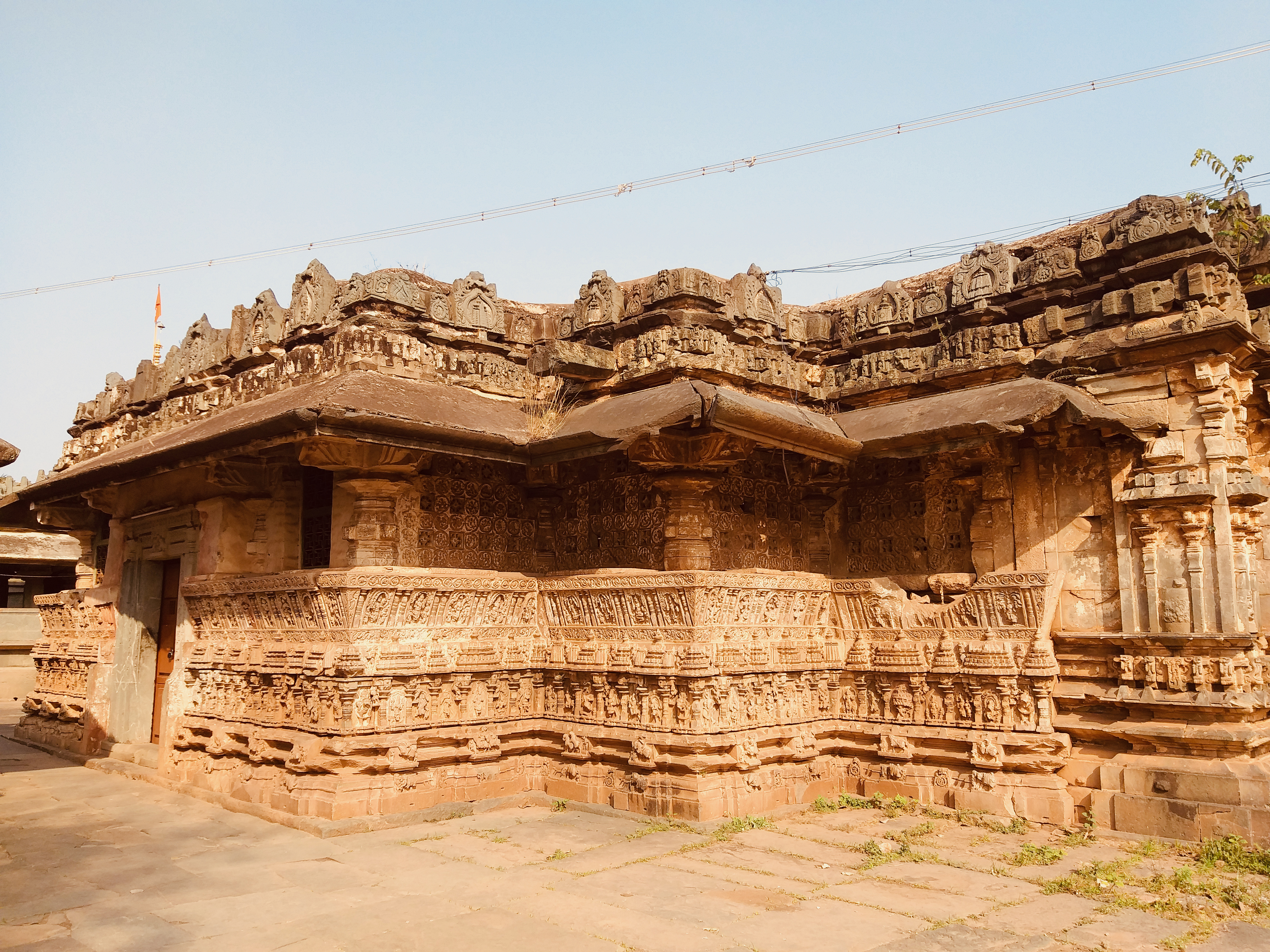
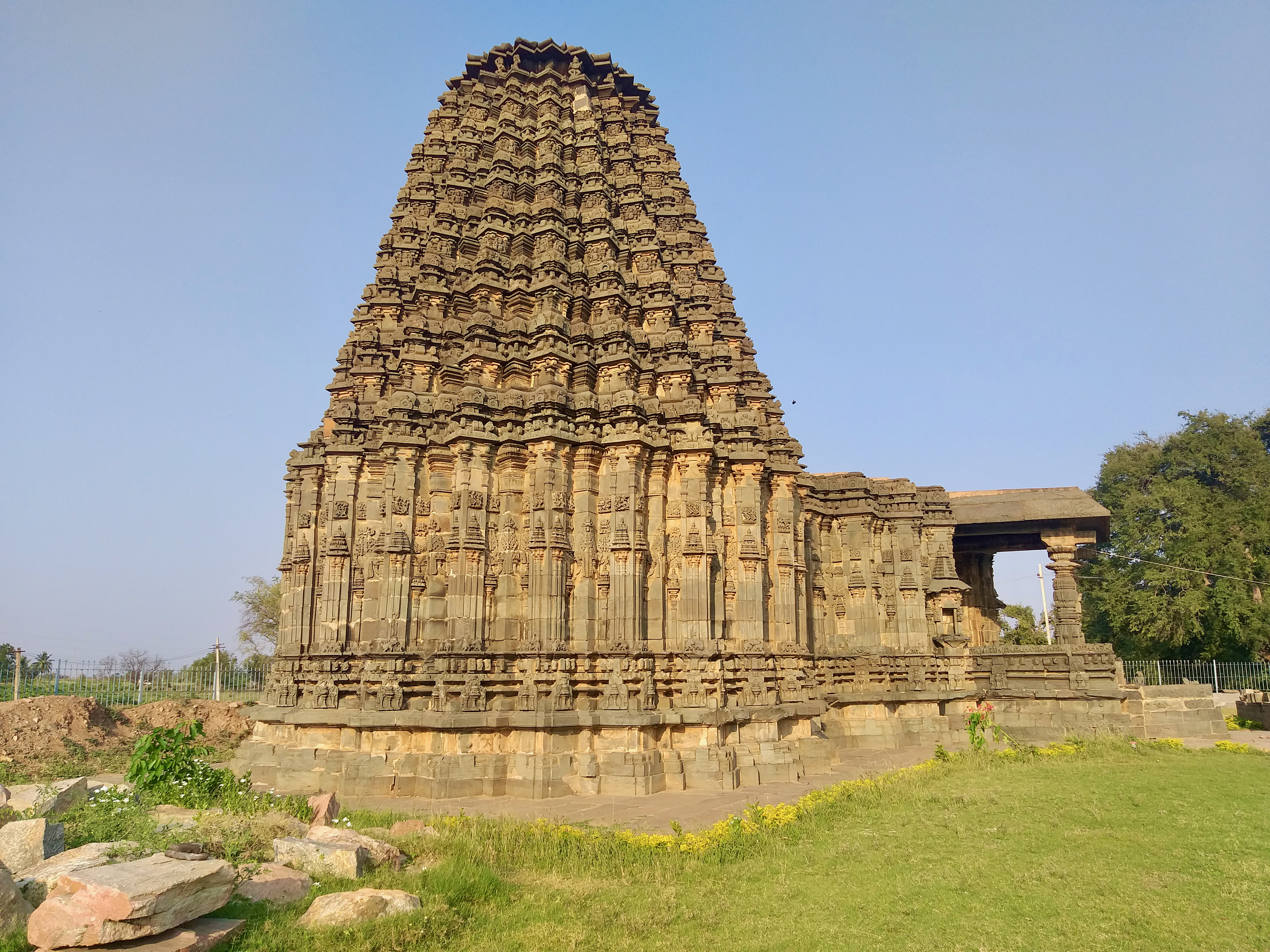
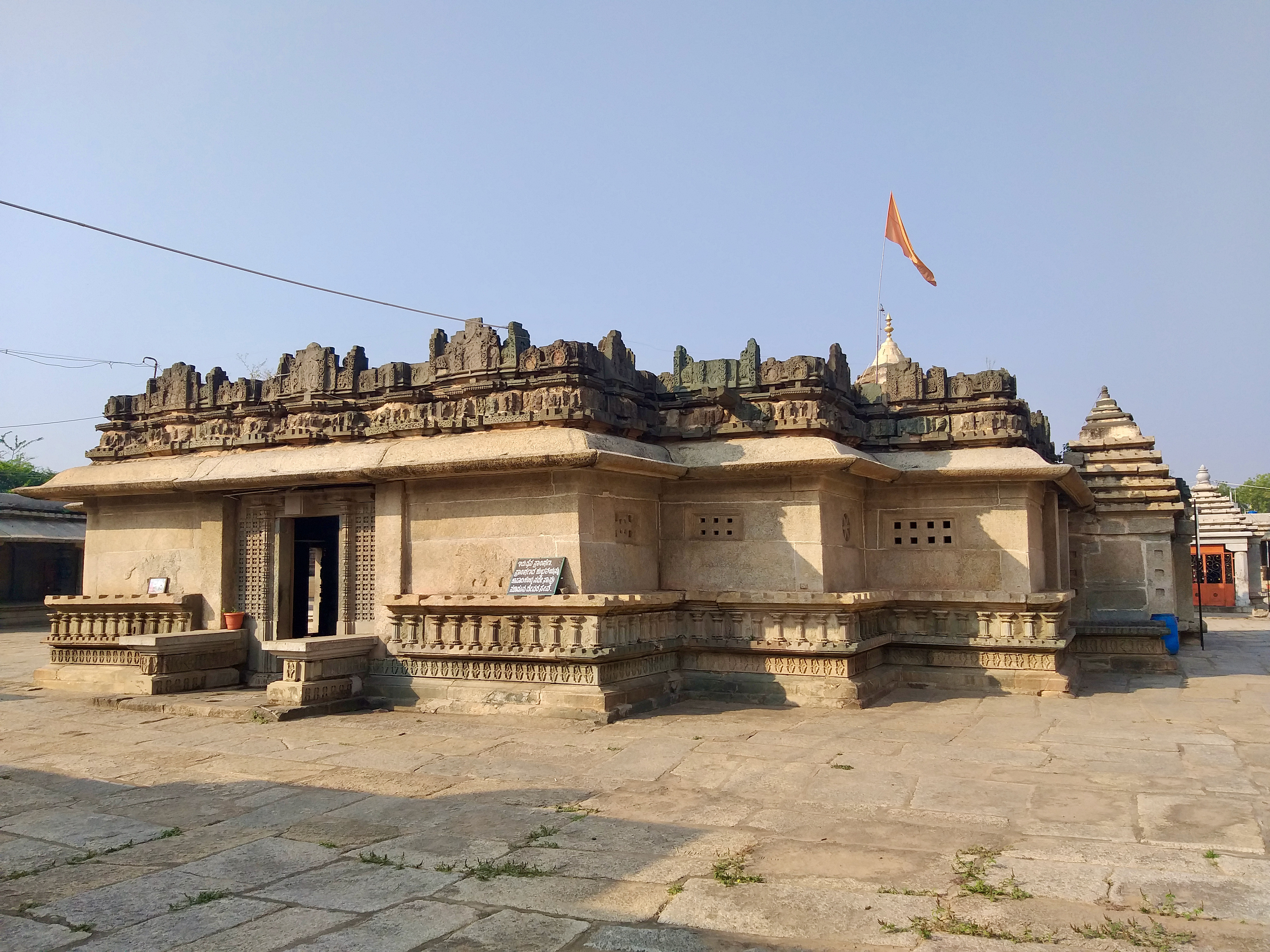
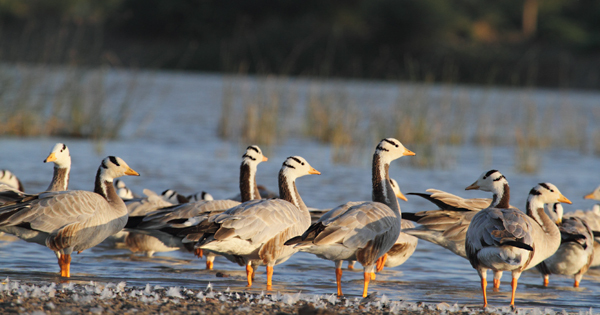
- Clockwise from top-left: Brahma Jinalaya at Lakkundi, Trikuteshwara temple, Someshwara temple in Lakshmeswar, Magadi Bird Sanctuary, Dodda Basappa Temple at Dambal
- Interactive map of Gadag district
- Coordinates: 15.4°N 75.75°E
- Country: India
- State: Karnataka
- Division: Belagavi
- Talukas: Gadag-Betageri, Ron, Mundargi, Naragund, Lakshmeshwar, Gajendragad, Shirhatti
- Headquarters: Gadag-Betageri

Government
  - Deputy Commissioner: C. N. SREEDHARA. IAS (IAS)

Area^{†}
  - Total: 4,656 km^{2} (1,798 sq mi)

Population (2001)^{†}
  - Total: 1,064,570
  - Density: 209/km^{2} (540/sq mi)
- Demonym: Gadagian

Languages
  - Official: Kannada
- Time zone: UTC+5:30 (IST)
- Postal code: 560047
- Telephone code: 08372XXXXXX
- Vehicle registration: KA-26
- Sex ratio: .969 ♂/♀
- Literacy: 64%
- Climate: Tropical wet and dry (Köppen)
- Precipitation: 631 millimetres (24.8 in)
- Website: gadag.nic.in

Gadag district is a district in the state of Karnataka, India. It was formed on 24 August 1997, when it was split from Dharwad district. The district headquarters is Gadag-Betageri.

As of 2011, it had a population of 1064570 (of which 35.21 percent was urban). The overall population increased by 13.14 percent from 1991 to 2001. Gadag district borders Bagalkot district on the north, Koppal district on the east, Vijayanagara district on the southeast, Haveri district on the southwest, Dharwad district on the west and Belgaum District on the northwest. It is famous for the many monuments (primarily Jain and Hindu temples) from the Western Chalukya Empire. It has seven talukas: Gadag, Gajendragad, Ron, Shirhatti, Nargund, Lakshmeshwar and Mundargi.

== Historical sites ==
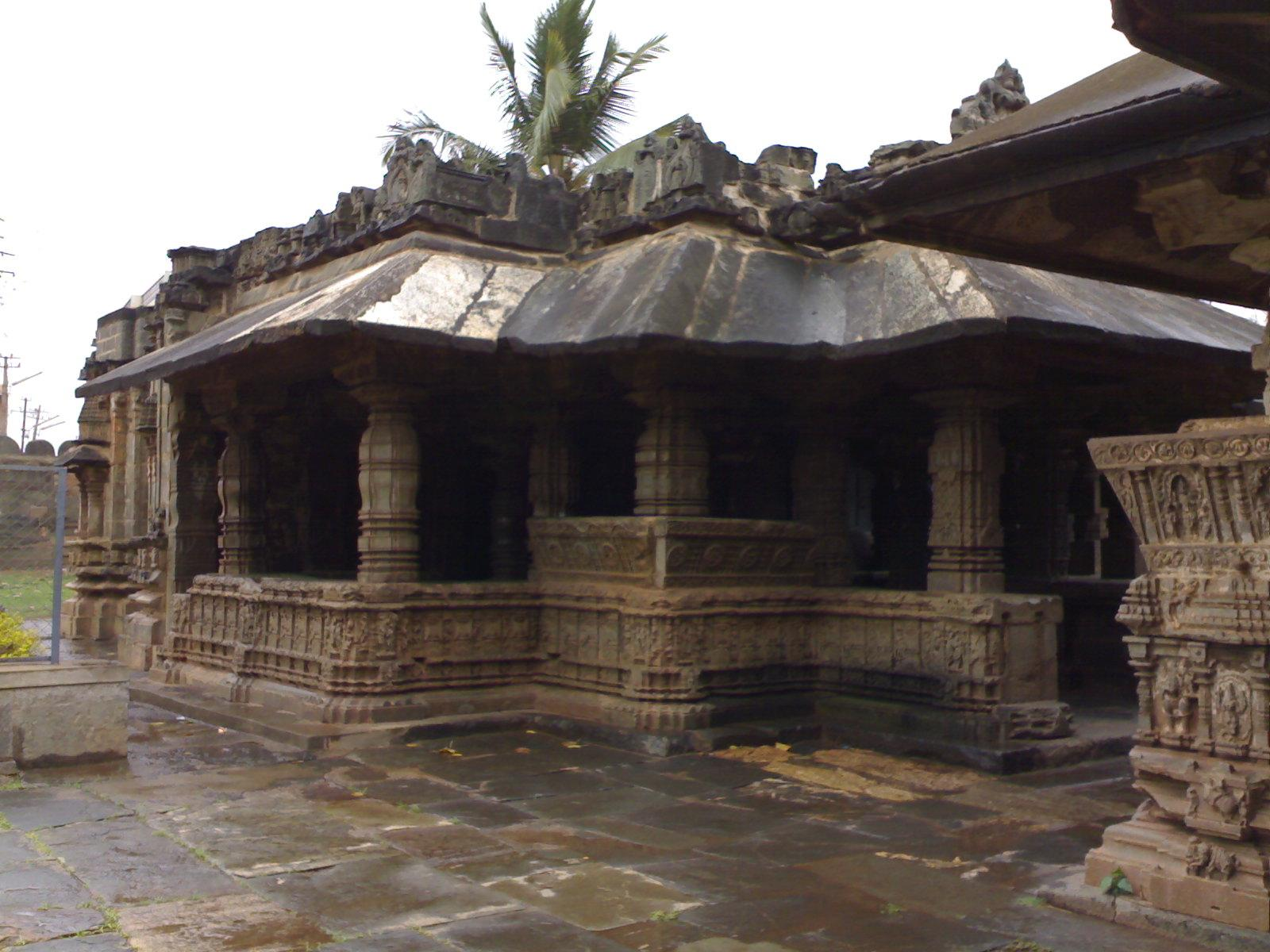
Saraswati temple at Trikuteshwara temple complex, Gadag

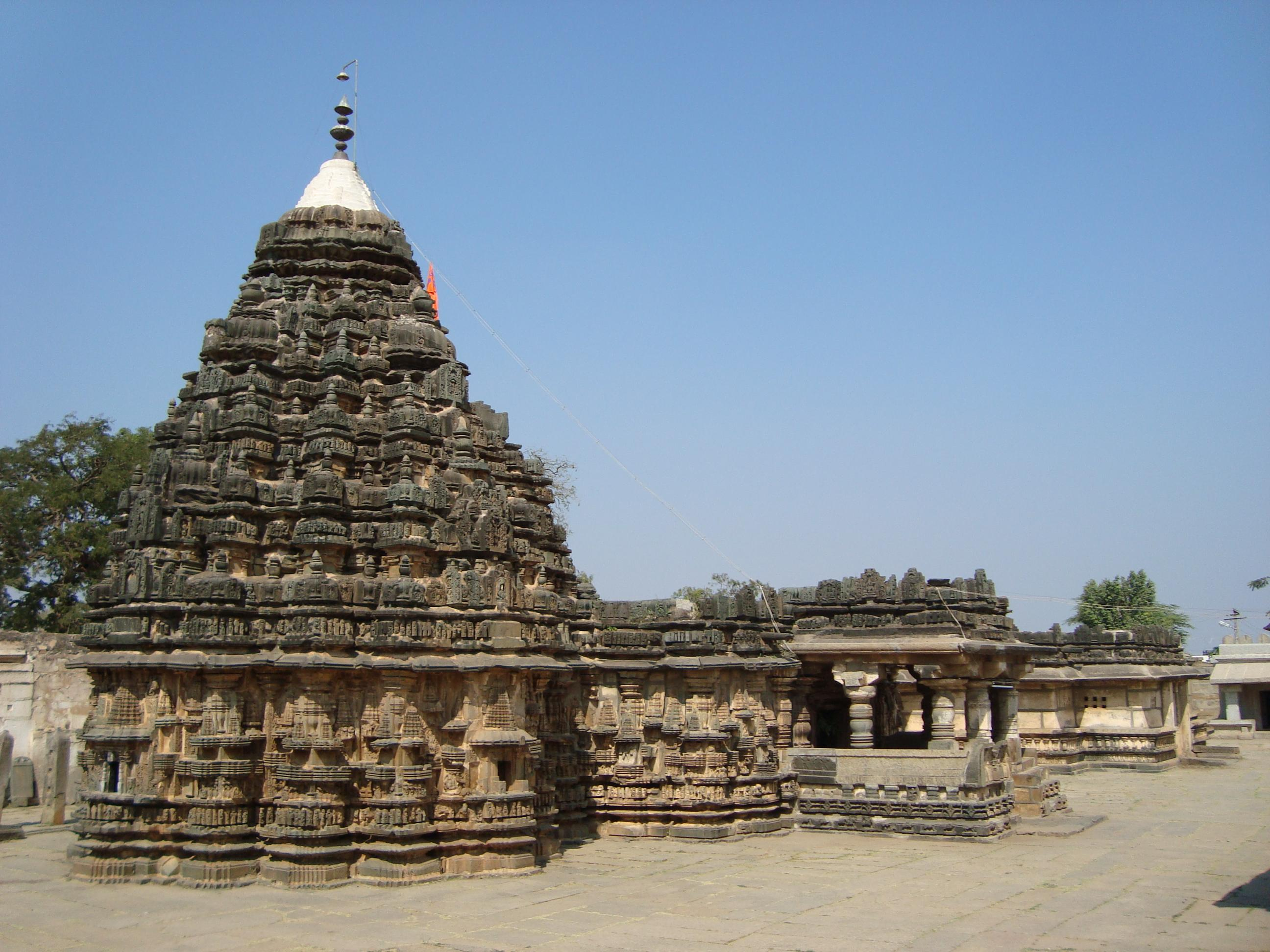
Someshwara temple at Lakshmeshwara

Gadag

The town has 11th and 12th century monuments. The temple of Veera Narayana and the Trikuteshwara complex are sites of religious and historic importance. One of the two main Jain temples is dedicated to Mahavira. Trikuteshwara temple complex: The Trikuteshwara temple was built by the early Chalukyas between the sixth and the eighth centuries, exemplifying Chalukya architecture. The temple is dedicated to Saraswati. Veeranarayana Temple: The temple, believed to have been built during the 11th century, attracts many devotees.

Lakshmeshwara

Lakshmeshwara is in Shirahatti taluka and is known for its Hindu & Jain temples and mosques. The Someshwara temple complex has a number of temples to Shiva in its fort-like compound.

Sudi

Chalukya monuments include the Jodi Gopura and twin towered Mallikarjuna temple and large Ganesha and Nandi statues.

Lakkundi

About 12 kilometres (7.5 mi) from Gadag, Lakkundi was the residence of the Chalukyan kings. It is known for its 101 stepwells (known as kalyani or pushkarni) and its Hindu & Jain temples. A sculpture gallery is maintained by the Archaeological Survey of India.

Dambal

Dambal is known for its 12th-century Chalukya Doddabasappa Temple.

Gajendragad

This is the biggest city after Gadag in Gadag district. Gajendragad is known for its hill fort and Kalakaleshwara temple, Nagavi, the famous Yellammadevi temple and a hill-view choultry under construction. It is 55 km from Gadag and is a politically rich village.

Harti

Harti has a number of Hindu temples. The Shri Basaveshwara Temple has an annual festival featuring a procession. Other temples, such as the Parvati Parameshwara temple (Uma Maheshwara Temple), have stone carvings from the Chalukya period.

Kotumachagi

About 22 kilometres (14 mi) from Gadag, the agricultural village is also known for its Someswar and Durgadevi temples. Chamarasa, author of the Prabhulingaleele, was born nearby.

Naregal

Home to the largest Jain temple built by the Rastrakuta dynasty.

Hombal

About 12 kilometres (7.5 mi) from Gadag, the village is known for old temples.

Belavanaki

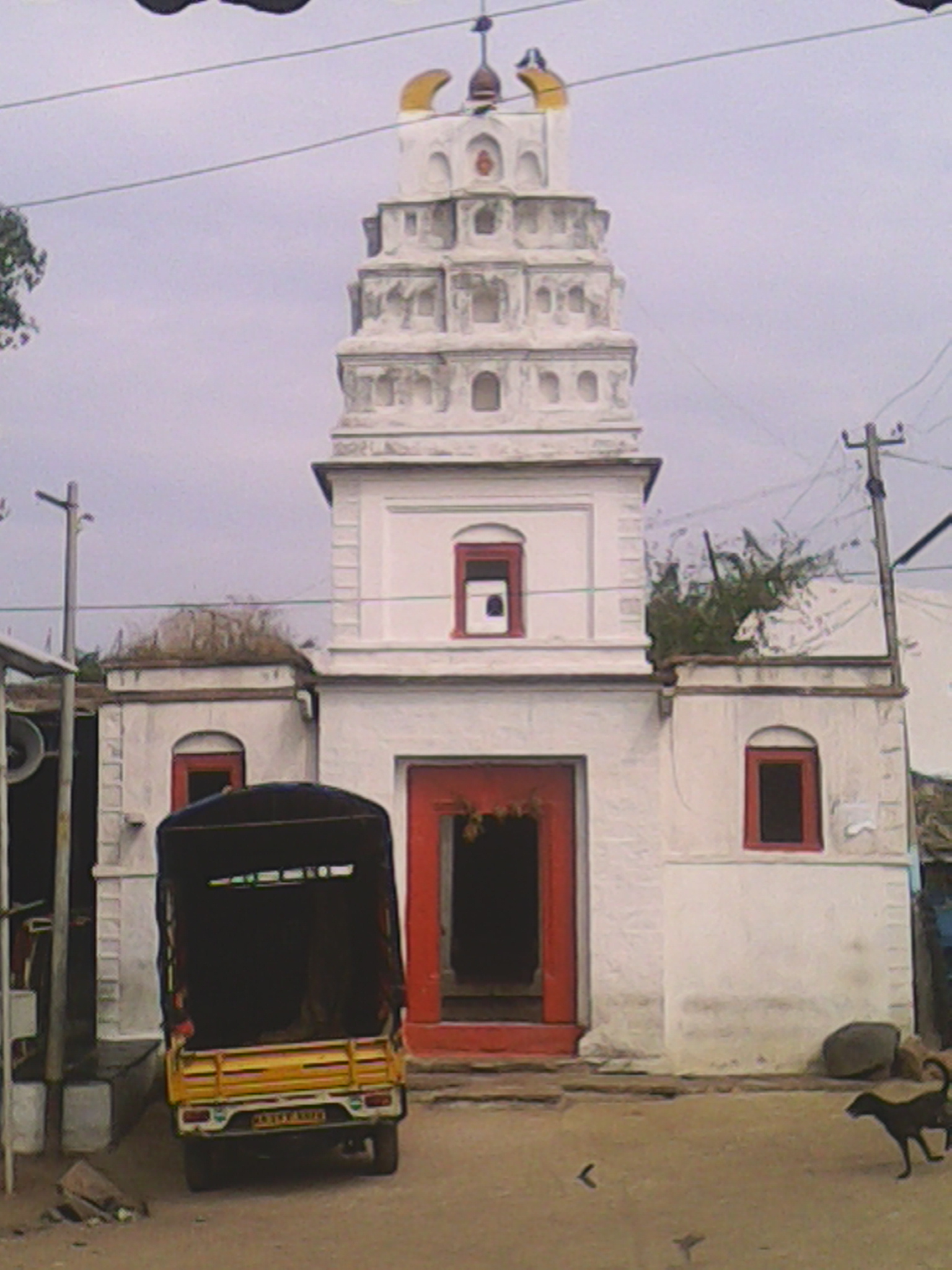
Rayara Temple Belavanaki

Belavanaki is about 33 km from Gadag. The village is known for the statue of Veerabhadra which is considered to be best sculpture of its kind in recent times. Earlier, the village was part of Belavalanaadu-300 or Belvola-300 therefore from that its name was derived. It is also the Birthplace of well known social activist S. R. Hiremath.

Ron

Rona's historic monuments include Anantsayee Gudi, Isvara Gudi, Isvara Temple, Kala Gudi, Lokanatha Temple, Mallikarjuna Gudi, Parsvanath Jain temple and the Somlingesvara temple.

Kurtakoti

About 16 kilometres (9.9 mi) from Gadag, the agricultural village is known for the Shri Ugra Narsimha, Dattatreya, Virupakhshalinga and Rama temples. Statues of Rama, Lakshmana and Sita were installed by Brahma Chaitanya. Writer and critic Kirtinath Kurtakoti hailed from the area.

Nargund

Nargund is an over 1000 year old hilltop fort from the times of the Rashtrakuta dynasty. In 1674, Maratha ruler Chatrapati Shivaji built a citadel here. It is also known for its role in the 1857 revolt when Bhaskar Rao Bhave, the ruler of Nargund revolted against the British, and the 1980s' Peasant movement during Gundu Rao's Chief Ministership of Karnataka and also as the birthplace of senior leader of Jana Sangh Jagannathrao Joshi.

Doni Tanda

About 24 kilometres (15 mi) from Gadag, and known for wind power generation.

Beladhadi

About 10 kilometres (6.2 mi) from Gadag, and known for its Shri Rama Temple and statues of Sri Rama, Lakshmana and Sita

Antur Bentur

About 23 kilometres (14 mi) from Gadag, the agricultural village is known for the Shri Jagadguru Budimahaswamigala Sanstan math Antur Bentur – Hosalli. The matha is cared for by both Muslims and Hindus.

== Gadag inscription ==
- The 'Gadag inscription' of Vikramaditya VI, records that Taila took the head of Panchala by the terror of the pride of his arm in battle.
- The inscription reveals that the battle was fought on the bank of the Godavari & ocean river and a certain Keshava (son of Madhava), fought in the battle and won Taila’s admiration.
- At the command of Sattiga (Satyashraya) in 1006 A.D., a Lenka Keta fell fighting at the battle of Unukallu, probably against the Cholas. An inscription', dated in Saka 930 (1008 A.D.) of the reign of Satyashraya refers to the siege of the agrahara Kaldugu in the Belvola 300 by Desinga and the destruction of the forces because of the treachery of king Perggade.
- The inscription of Ballala recounts his victory as "And by force, he, the strong one, defeated with cavalry only, and deprived of his sovereignty, the general Brahmana whose army was strengthened by an array of elephants and who acquired 60 tusked elephants with a single tuskless elephant, when, on account of an insult, he was tearing the royal fortune from the family of the Kalachuris of Kalyani."

== Demographics ==
Historical population
Year	Pop.	±% p.a.
1901	352,503	—
1911	331,414	−0.62%
1921	350,355	+0.56%
1931	350,961	+0.02%
1941	393,739	+1.16%
1951	436,914	+1.05%
1961	526,172	+1.88%
1971	622,722	+1.70%
1981	743,345	+1.79%
1991	859,042	+1.46%
2001	971,835	+1.24%
2011	1,064,570	+0.92%

According to the 2011 census the district has a population of 1,064,570. This ranks it 426th in India (out of a total of 640). The district has a population density of 229 inhabitants per square kilometre (590/sq mi). Its population growth rate from 2001 to 2011 was 9.61 percent. The district has a sex ratio of 978 females for every 1000 males and a literacy rate of 75.18 percent. 35.63% of the population lives in urban areas. Scheduled Castes and Scheduled Tribes make up 16.36% and 5.79% of the population respectively.

Religion in Gadag district (2011)
Hinduism	85.27%
Islam	13.50%
Jainism	0.56%
Other or not stated	0.67%

Hindus are in majority in the district with 85.27% of the population. Muslims are second with 13.50% of the population. There is still a sizeable population of Jains in the district, around 6,000, which are the third largest religion.

Languages in Gadag district (2011)
1. Kannada (85.3%)
2. Urdu (8.37%)
3. Lambadi (3.06%)
4. Others (3.25%)

Kannada is the main language of the district and is spoken by 85.32% of the population. Urdu is the second-largest language and is spoken by 8.37%, mainly in urban areas. Lambadi is spoken by 3.06% of the population.

== Wildlife Sanctuary ==
The Magadi Bird Sanctuary, created at the Magadi reservoir, is 26 kilometres (16 mi) from Gadag on the Gadag-Bangalore Road, 8 kilometres (5.0 mi) from Shirhatti and 11 kilometres (6.8 mi) from Lakshmeshwar. It is known for migratory species such as the bar-headed goose, which feed on fish and agricultural crops.

Kappatagudda Wildlife Sanctuary is another wildlife sanctuary in the district. It was formed in 2019.

== Cooperative movement ==
The first cooperative in India was founded over 100 years ago in Kanaginahal, and K. H. Patil aided in its modernisation.

Education Institutions

- Gadag Institute Of Medical Sciences, Gadag. - (Now changed to K. H. Patil Institute of medical sciences)

- Karnataka State Rural Development And Panchayat Raj University, Nagavi - Gadag.

- Jagaduguru TontadaryaCollege Of Engineering, Gadag.

- Rural Engineering College, Hulkoti - Gadag.

- Government Engineering College, Nargund.

- Karnataka University PG Centre, Gadag.

- KLE's J T College, Gadag.

- KLE's S A Manvi Law College, Gadag.

- KSS College, Gadag.

- Govt PU College, Gadag.

== Wind-power generation ==
The district generates wind power at Kappatagudda, Binkadakatti, Hulkoti, Kurtkoti, Beladhadi, Kalasapur, Mallasamudra, Mulgund, Kanaginahal, Harlapur, Halligudi, Abbigeri and Gajendragad.

== Notable people ==
- Kumara Vyasa – 15th century Kannada poet, known for his epic Karnata Bharata Kathamanjari, was born in Koliwada
- Chamarasa – 15th century Kannada poet, known for his epic Prabhulingaleele
- Panchakshara Gawai
- Bhimsen Joshi – Hindustani singer, was born in Ron
- Puttaraj Gawai
- Sunil Joshi (cricketer)
- Jagannathrao Joshi
- Chennaveera Kanavi
- Aluru Venkata Rao
- Durgasimha ( Author of The Panchatantra Tales )
- Fakkirappa Annappa Mulgund - Freedom Fighter and Noted Gandhian
- Andanappa Doddameti - Freedom fighter
- Mundaragi Bheemaraya - Freedom fighter
- Bhaskar Rao Bhave ( Also known as Babasaheb Bhave) - Freedom fighter
- Venkusa Bhandage ( Freedom fighter)
- Siddanagouda S Patil ( Founder of Asia's first Co Operative Society )
- Vilas Neelagund (International Sprint Runner - Mulgund)
- Husensab Dhalayat (International Marathoner - Mulgund)

== See also ==
- Tourism in North Karnataka
- Lakkundi
- Sudi
- Lakshmeshwara
- Gajendragad
- Dambal
- Doddabasappa Temple
- Naregal, Gadag
- Mahadeva Temple (Itagi)
- Itagi Bhimambika
- Gadag Institute of Medical Sciences
