= Lalitha Srinivasan =

Indian Bharatanatyam dancer (born 1943)

- Born: 24 August 1943 (age 82); Shivasamudra, British India
- Occupations: Dancer, Choreographer, Dance Teacher
- Known for: Bharatanatyam
- Awards: Sangeet Natak Akademi Amrit Award; Rajyotsava Prashasti; Karnataka Sangeeta Nritya Academy Award; Shantala Natya Shri Award

Lalitha Srinivasan is an Indian Bharatanatyam dancer, choreographer and dance teacher from Karnataka. For her contribution to Bharatanatyam, she received the Sangeet Natak Akademi Amrit Award by Sangeet Natak Akademi, Government of India, Karnataka Kalatilaka by the Karnataka Sangeeta Nritya Academy, Rajyotsava Prashasti, and the Shantala Natya Shri Award from the Government of Karnataka.

== Biography ==
Lalitha Srinivasan was born on August 24, 1943, in Shivasamudra in present-day Karnataka state of India. At her younger years, she lived in various small towns in Karnataka, because of her father's job.

Her family, noticing her interest in dance very early, trained her in Bharatanatyam at the age of ten under Guru H. R. Keshava Murthy in Bangalore. However, she gave up dancing completely after her marriage at the age of 19. But being interested in dance theory, she studied it and passed the proficiency exams with first rank. She made her Bharathanatyam debut in 1966. Later she received her advanced training under K. Venkatalakshamma, legendary Mysore Court dancer and exponent of Mysore School of Bharatanatyam. In addition, she has also learned Music, Veena, painting, and interior designing. She also completed master's degree and DLitt in History.

Lalitha Srinivasan now lives at her house in Malleswaram in Bengaluru.

== Career ==
An exponent in the Mysore style, she is noted in the area of abhinaya (acting). She has performed in various parts of India and abroad and has also presented lecture-demonstrations at different venues in the country. She has choreographed dance productions such as Chitrangadha, Sri Krishna Parijatha, Lasyotsava, Prem Bhakti Mukti, Koushika Sukritam, Gowdara Malli, Deva Kannika, and Nisha Vibhrama. In 1978, she founded the Nupura School of Bharatanatyam, which focuses on teaching and promoting the Mysore style of Bharatanatyam. For more than thirty years, she has directed Nitya Nritya, a national level dance festival in Bangalore.

== Books published ==
Karnataka Sangeeta Nritya Academy has published her two books, Dance in Karnataka and Dance Sculptures of Karnataka and a biography of K. Venkatalakshamma.

== Awards and honors ==
Lalitha Srinivasan received the Sangeet Natak Akademi Amrit Award for her contribution to Bharatanatyam, in 2023. She also received several other awards and honors including the Shiromani, and Priyadarshini awards at the national level, Karnataka Kalatilaka by the Karnataka Sangeeta Nritya Academy, Rajyotsava Prashasti, and the Shantala Natya Shri Award Award from the Government of Karnataka.

== Nupura school of Bharatanatyam ==
In 1978, Lalitha Srinivasan founded the Nupura School of Bharatanatyam in Malleswaram, Bangalore, Karnataka, which focuses on teaching and promoting the Mysore style of Bharatanatyam. Since its inception, it trained more than 500 students. Lalitha's daughter Manu Srinivasan, who is also a dancer, is the secretary of Nupura school now.
