= Sankethi =

Sankethi may refer to:

- Sankethi people, of Karnataka, India
- Sankethi language, their South Dravidian language

== See also ==
- Sanket (disambiguation)
