= M. S. Ananthapadmanabha Rao =

Kannada Laureate, poet, Writer and Gamaki

M S Ananthapadmanabha Rao
- Born: 6 September 1903; Madikeri, Coorg, India
- Died: 29 November 1987 (aged 84); Bangalore, Karnataka, India
- Occupations: Retd. reporter, Coorg State Assembly, Laureate, Poet and Gamaki
- Writing career
- Period: 1903–1987
- Genres: Drama, poetry, short stories
- Movement: Navodaya

Gamaka Vidwan M S Ananthapadmanabha Rao (6 September 1903 – 29 November 1987) was an Indian Kannada-language poet, writer, and gamaki. He was the author of the magnum opus Karnata Bharatha Kathamanjari containing the last eight parvas of the Kannada translation of the Mahabharatha that Kumaravyasa had left unfinished.

== Biography ==
=== Early life ===
Rao was born on 6 September 1903. He pursued his education at Madikeri under the guidance and tutelage of veteran laureate Panje Mangesh Rao.

=== Family ===
Rao married Lakshmi Devi. They had 4 children.

=== Career ===
Ananthapadmanabha Rao had chosen shorthand, bookkeeping and typewriting as his specialisations. After completing his matriculation, he joined the Department of State Excise under the then Coorg Government. In recognition of his abilities, in the year 1930 the Coorg Government posted Ananthapadmanabha Rao to Vellore to get trained in shorthand. He learnt Kannada shorthand and later joined the Police Department as the first ever reporter specialising in Kannada Shorthand.

Coorg later became a Part C State and was granted the status of Independent State, for the first time forming an independent legislative assembly. Ananthapadmanabha Rao, was appointed as the Kannada Reporter in the Independent Coorg Legislative Assembly.

== Contributions to Kannada literature ==
=== Kannada Koota ===
Panje Mangesh Rao established and started a Kannada Koota (Kannada Group) with the support of his fellow teachers and colleagues B S Kushalappa, Shenoy Master, G Shrinivas Murthy and C M Rama Rao who also became the first members of the group. Ananthapadmanabha Rao and his friends B K Subba Rao, G S Keshavacharya and a few others became the youth workers.

=== Kannada Sahitya Sammelana ===
In the year 1932, the Kannada Sahitya Parishat organised its 18th annual literature conference. Legendary scholar and poet, DV Gundappa was chosen as the president of the conference. Odlemane Aatmaram Shastri, Shenoy Master, DM Siddhalingaiah and others were part of the presiding committee. First in the line amongst the youth workers was Ananthapadmanabha Rao. Ananthapadmanabha Rao, drew the attention and appreciation of DVG, who inspired him to become a lifetime member of Kannada Sahitya Parishat. DVG handed over the left over funds of the conference and suggested Ananthapadmanabha Rao to establish a Kannada Sangha at Coorg. Thus, in the year 1932, with the blessings of DVG, the first ever Kodagu Kannada Sangha was established and started. Ananthapadmanabha Rao became the first Director of the sangha and in the later days he also served as its Secretary and Vice-President.

Ananthapadmanabha Rao was also selected as the member of Kannada Sahitya Parishat's working committee and became the representative of the Coorg State. He conceptualised and organised the Vasanta Sahityotsava (the spring festival of literature) every year. In the name of this festival, many stalwarts of Kannada literature like BM Shri, TP Kailasam, GP Rajaratnam, AaNaKru, TaRaSu, Ta Su Shyama Rao, Shamba Joshi, Da Ra Bendre, Kuvempu, Shivarama Karanth, M Govinda Pai, and many more visited Coorg. Ananthapadmanabha Rao also invested his time in organising many other literary programmes like the Navaratri Utsava at the Madikeri Vedanta Sangha and Shrimadaanjaneya Temple, Ramotsava Literature festival and so on.

=== Kannada Sangha and Sangeetha Nataka Academy ===
During these days Ananthapadmanabha Rao, invited Masti Venkatesh Iyengar to Somwarpet for a literature programme. Masti agreed, however on a condition that he would visit the place only if there was a Kannada Sangha established. Ananthapadmanabha Rao, with the support of coffee planter Chandrappa, established the Somwarpet Kannada Sangha over night. Chakradana Murthy became the first Secretary. Eventually Masti Venkatesh Iyengar was welcomed graciously at Somwarpet. Ananthapadmanabha was later appointed as the Secretary of the Coorg wing of Sangeetha Nataka Academy

== Gamaki ==
People from different walks of life attended the Kannada Sahitya Sammelana (Literature Conference) held in 1932. As part of the event, Gamaka Bhageeratha Kalale Sampathkumaracharya performed Kaavya Vachana or Gamaka Vachana for 3 consecutive days. Inspired by this performance, Ananthapadmanabha Rao was drawn towards to the art of Gamaka. Until then, Ananthapadmanabha Rao was a Harikatha artiste. He had also composed the Jadabharatha Upakhayana (a piece of poetry) specifically for the Harikatha aspirants. Gamaka as a new art form drew his attention and interest. In the later days he got himself admitted as a pupil of Gamaka Vidwan Krishnagiri Krishna Rao and mastered the art of Gamaka. In the year 1942, he started to teach Gamaka to aspiring students and contributed to the development and survival of the art form. Ananthapadmanabha Rao had a special interest in Hindustani music ragas.

Poet D R Bendre was one of the biggest admirers of Ananthapadmanabha Rao as a Gamaki. On the occasion of Bendre's 50th birthday, he invited Ananthapadmanabha Rao to his house to perform Kavya Vachana and encouraged him. Rashtrakavi Kuvempu once told him, "You have the blessings of Krishnagiri Krishna Rao. You are just not a singer, but you are the cuckoo of Coorg (Kodagina Kogile)". Later, in the year 1983, Ananthapadmanabha Rao became the president of the first ever state level Gamaka Sammelana (Gamaka Conference) organised by the Karnataka Gamaka Kala Parishat. He was honoured with the title of Gamaka Rathnakara.

== Literary works ==
=== Short stories ===
- Doddanchina Seere
- Nammadalla
- Ayyo Bhoota
- Gopu Maduve
- Putta Kittana Guttu
- Kalavida
- Head Munshi

=== Drama ===
- Shrungiya Shaapa
- Devammaaji
- Shava Samskaara

=== Kaavya ===
- Mahatma Kabir – composed in Bhamini Shatpadi, published in the Chamaraja Nagar's "Kadambari Sangraha”
- Kaveri Kathamrutham – in the Sarala Ragale style of poetry
- Karna (Preamble by Shri. B M Shri) – This was given the status of a text book in the then Madras University.
- Ramakrishna Paramahamsa
- Tulasi Ramayana (Kannada Translation of Ramacharita Maanas by Shri. Tulasi Das) with a preamble by Shri. DVG. Shri. Shamanna, Ananthpadmanabha Rao's friend's father suggested to translate the Hindi Ramacharita Manas to Kannada. Ananthapadmanabha Rao replied saying "I do not know Hindi, neither do I excel in Sanskrit. How can I translate this great piece of work?" Shri. Shamanna, who had an expertise in Hindi language, pursuing his suggestion, started to spend every day with Ananthapadmanabha Rao, reading out 5 verses a day and explaining the meaning of it. With the notes made during these daily meetings, Ananthapadmanabha Rao eventually translated the epic Ramacharita Maanas and composed the "Tulasi Ramayana" in the Vardhaka Shatpadi style containing more than 2500 poems.
- Shri Krishna Charitamrutam – in the Vardhaka Shatpadi style of Poetry
- Shri Madhwacharita Maanasa – in the Vardhaka Shatpadi style of Poetry
- Vishwamithra

=== Poetry ===
- Brindavana
- Kanike
- Guru Keertana Mala

=== Bruhat Kavya (Magnum Opus of Ananthapadmanabha Rao) ===
- Karnata Bharata Kathamanjari (Kumaravyasa'a unfinished last 8 parvas of Mahabharata, containing more than 8000 poems. This is in the Bhamini Shatpadi style of Poetry)

=== Audio ===
In the year 2000, Madikeri Nagendra released "Yatiwara Banda Raghavendra" music album consisting of songs composed by Ananthapadmanabha Rao under his direction. While he was the singer and music composer of the Album, Tirumale Srinivas had composed the background music. Paneesh Rao had produced this music album under the Parimala Creations banner.

== Awards and honors ==
- Mysore's Devaraja Bahaddur Datti Award in 1952 for his work, Tulasi Ramayana
- Kannada Sahitya Academy Award for the Year 1977 – 78
- Gamaka Ratnakara honour by the Karnataka Gamaka Kala Parishat in the year 1983

== Death ==
Ananthapadmanabha Rao died on 29 November 1987.
