= Hosahalli =

Hosahalli Gamaka Grama
- village
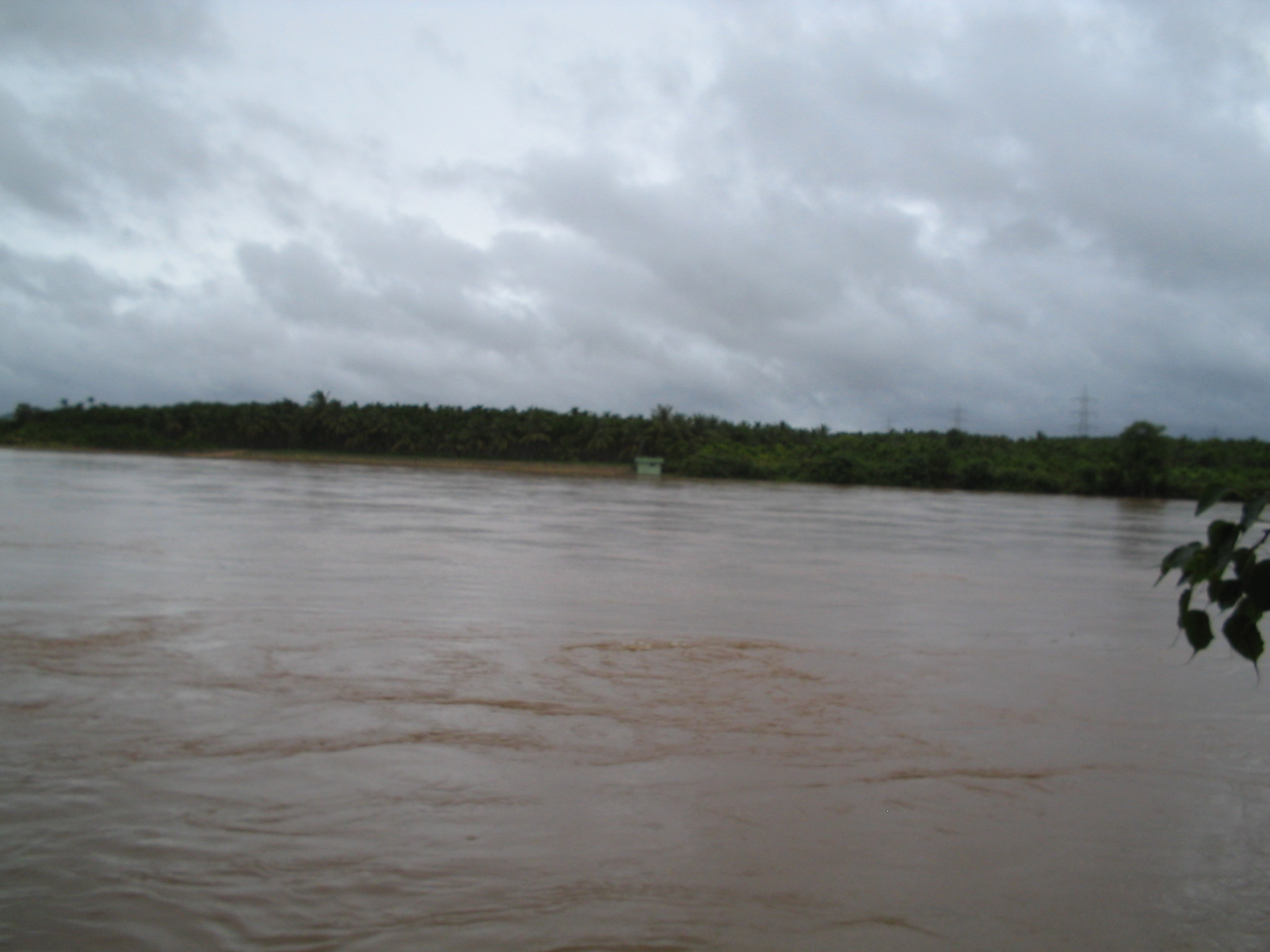
- River Tunga during the monsoon
- Interactive map of Hosahalli
- Coordinates: 13.53675°N 77.24712°E
- Country: India
- State: Karnataka
- District: Shimoga
- Named after: Gamaka

Government
  - Type: Panchayat raj
  - Body: Gram panchayat

Languages
  - Official: Sankethi, Kannada
- Time zone: UTC+5:30 (IST)
- Postal code: 577 202
- ISO 3166 code: IN-KA
- Vehicle registration: KA
- Nearest city: Shivamogga
- Lok Sabha constituency: Shimoga
- Website: karnataka.gov.in

Hosahali is one of twin-villages Mattur-Hosahali, on the banks of the Tunga River in Karnataka state, southern India. It lies in an agricultural region where the main crop is the Areca nut. It is known for Sanskrit, Veda, Gamaka (storytelling) and Sangeetha (Carnatic music) Padma Shri awardee H. R. Keshava Murthy is also from this village. From above, the village appears as a "Paa Ni Pee Tha" (a seat with an extended hand). The village is situated a little over 5 km from Shimoga city and around 4 km from Gajanur Tunga Anicut (dam).

== Temples ==
The village has several temples or religious sites.

- Lord Channakeshava temple with an impressive Rajagopuram (royal temple tower) at its entrance.
- Durgamaa temple at one end of the village.
- Shri Rama mandiram is at the heart of the village where Bhajans (devotional singing) on Saturdays and festive days.
- Mallikarjuna Swamy (Lord Shiva) temple on the bank of river Tunga
- Varasiddhi Vinayaka Swamy (Lord Ganesha) temple
- Mariyamma temple
- Shastri temple
- shri abhaya anjaneya Swamy devasthana beside durgaa temple

== Institutions ==
Gayathri Veda Pathashaala is a residential vedic school which has a library of books about vedas and mythology. Students learn Krishna Yajurveda. Gamaka Kala Parishat (Academy for Gamaka art), Sankethi Sangeetha Sabha, and Geleyara Balaga are other institutions which occasionally conduct programmes in a village social building activity called Gamaka Bhavana. There is also a branch (shakha) of the volunteer organisation Rashtriya Swayamsevak Sangh in the village.
