= Gamaka =

Gamaka may refer to:

- Gamaka (storytelling), a form of storytelling by singing that originated in Karnataka, India
- Gamaka (music), types of ornamentations used in Indian classical music
