= Gudde Mardi =

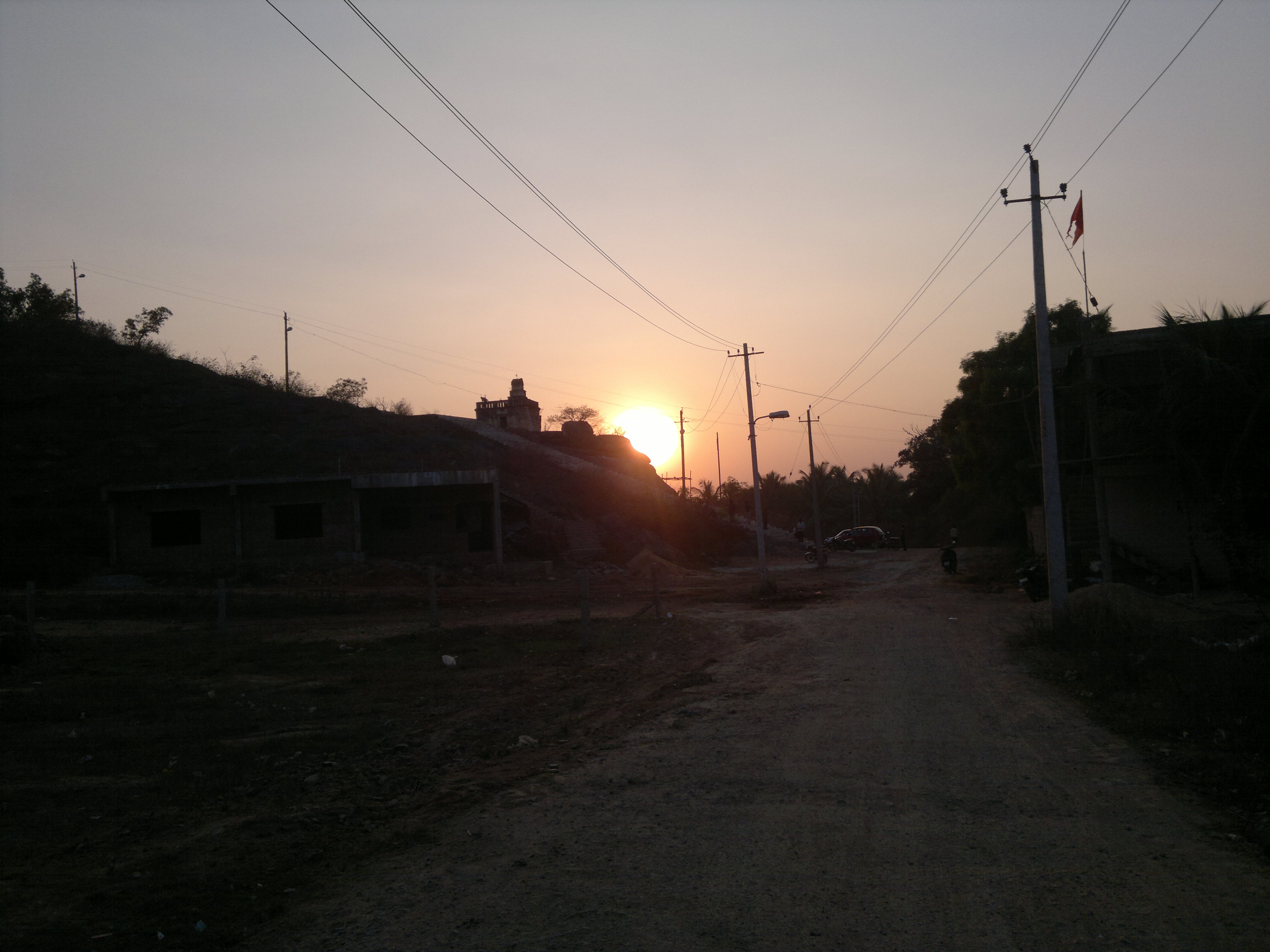
- Gudde Mardi Temple at sunset

Highest point
- Elevation: 45 metres (148 ft)
- Prominence: 40 metres (131 ft)
- Coordinates: 13°54′02″N 75°34′25″E

Geography
- Location: Shimoga, Karnataka state

Geology
- Mountain type: Hill

Gudde Mardi is a small hill near the city of Shimoga, in Karnataka, India. Gudde Mardi is 3 kilometres (1.9 mi) from the village of Mattur.
