= Muttur =

Muttur may refer to:

- Muthur (commonly transliterated as Muttur) town in Kangeyam taluk in Tirupur district, Tamil Nadu, India.
- Muttur (Sri Lanka)
- Kannadiga village Mattur
