= M. R. Kamala =

Poet, Writer

- Born: 27 March 1959 (age 67) Metikurke, Arasikere, Hassan, Karnataka, India
- Occupation: Poet, Writer, PU College Principal and Lecturer
- Notable awards: Karnataka Sahitya Academy award

Metikurke Ramaswamy Kamala is a writer, and a poet in Kannada language who is a recipient of Karnataka Sahitya Academy award.

== Early life and education ==
Kamala was born in Metikurke, a village in Hassan district of Karnataka. Her parents, N H Raamaswamy and Vishaalakshi had farmlands. Her father a gamaka performer, encouraged her interest in literature.

Kamala's early education was in her hometown Metikurke school. She received a B.A degree from MES College, and a M.A Kannada from Bangalore University in 1980. She also studied a LLB degree and a diploma in French language from Bangalore University.

== Career ==
Kamala started writing poems and stories at a young age, and while studying in college, she published her works in college magazines and local newspapers. Her first poetry collection, Shakuntalopakhyana was published in 1988.

Some of her selected poems have been printed in English, Bengali, Gujarati, Malayalam, Telugu and Marathi languages, and in 2005, some were set to music by a Kannada composer C. Ashwath.

She has translated books from other languages into Kannada. She has primarily focused on translating works written by women writers from Africa, Arab nations, and African-Americans. She translated Maya Angelou's autobiography I Know Why the Caged Bird Sings into Kannada.

M. R. Kamala started her career working as a Kannada Lecturer in a Pre-University (PU) College, at Halebidu in 1981 and retired as a Principal of Shivanahalli Pre-University College (PU), Rajajinagar, Bengaluru in 2018.

== Bibliography ==
- Shakuntalopakhyana (1988)
- Kattala Hoovina Haadu (1989)
- Jaane Mattu Itara KavitegaLu (1992)
- Jivananandara Kavitegalu (2003)
- Hoovu Chellida Haadi (2007)
- Nettarali Nenda Chandra (2016)
- Maaribidi (2017)
- Oora Beediya Suttu (2020)
- Gadyagandhi (2020)
- Quarantine (2020)
- Kappu Hakkiya Belakina Haadu
- Rosa Parks
- Sere Hakki Haduvudu Ekendu Balle

== Awards and recognitions ==
- Karnataka Sahitya Academy Award
- Translation Academy award
- Kuvempu Bhasha Bharathi Award (2007)
- SV Parameshwara Bhat award (2017)
- Maasti award (2018)
- BM Shri Golden Medal winner
- Muddanna poetry award
- Amma Award instituted by the Matrushree Mahadevamma Nagappa Munnur Prathishtan
- Matrushri Ratnamma Hedge Memorial Award
