= Mattur =

- village
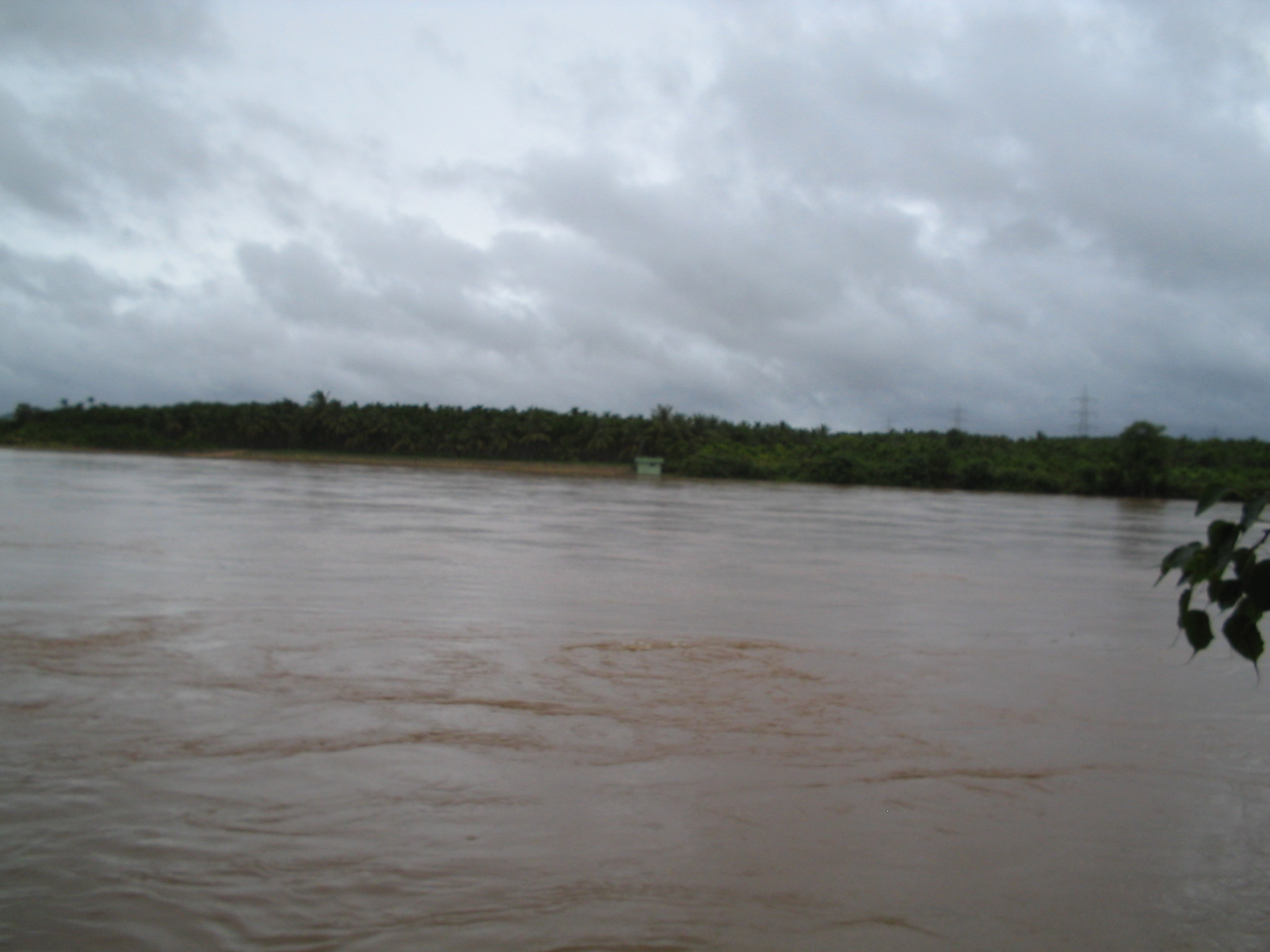
- The Tunga River at Mattur
- Nickname: Sanskrit village
- Location in Karnataka, India
- Coordinates: 13°52′26″N 75°33′32″E
- Country: India
- State: Karnataka
- District: Shivamogga district

Government
  - Body: Gram panchayat

Languages
  - Official: Kannada
- Time zone: UTC+5:30 (IST)
- Nearest city: Shivamogga

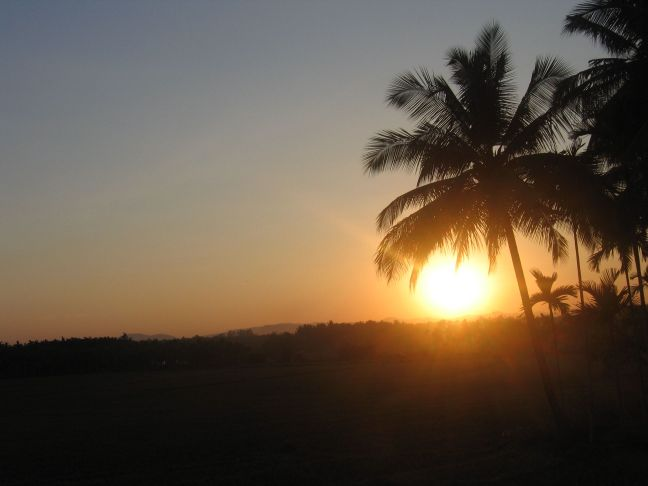
Sunset in Mattur

Mattur (or Mathoor) is a village in Shivamogga district near the city of Shivamogga in Karnataka state, India, known for the usage of Sanskrit for day-to-day communication, although the general language of the state is Kannada. Mattur is known for being one of the few Sanskrit-speaking villages of India. Their native language is Sankethi, which is a mixture of Sanskrit, Tamil and Kannada.

Mattur is located by the Tunga River around 4 kilometres from Shivamogga and has long been known as a centre of learning for Sanskrit and Vedic studies. According to copper plate inscriptions preserved by the archaeology department, Mattur, along with neighbouring Hosahalli, was gifted to the people by the emperor of Vijayanagara in 1512.

Sanskrit is the main language of a majority of the 5,000 residents of this village and is a required subject in schools. This rare trait received a significant boost in 1982 when Vishvesha Theertha, pontiff of Udupi's Pejawara Matha, visited the Mattur and dubbed it, "the Sanskrit village". The village has produced over 30 professors of Sanskrit who teach in universities across Karnataka.

Mattur's twin village, Hosahalli, shares almost all the qualities of Mattur. Hosahalli is situated across the bank of the Tunga River. These two villages are almost always referred to together. Mattur and Hosahalli are known for their efforts to support Gamaka art, which is a unique form of singing and storytelling in Karnataka.

Mattur has traditionally been home to a community of Sankethi Brahmins among its residents. It has a temple of Rama, a Shivalaya, Someshwara Temple and Lakshmikeshava Dhurga Temple.
