= Veeranarayana Temple, Gadag =

Veeranarayana Temple
- Hindu temple
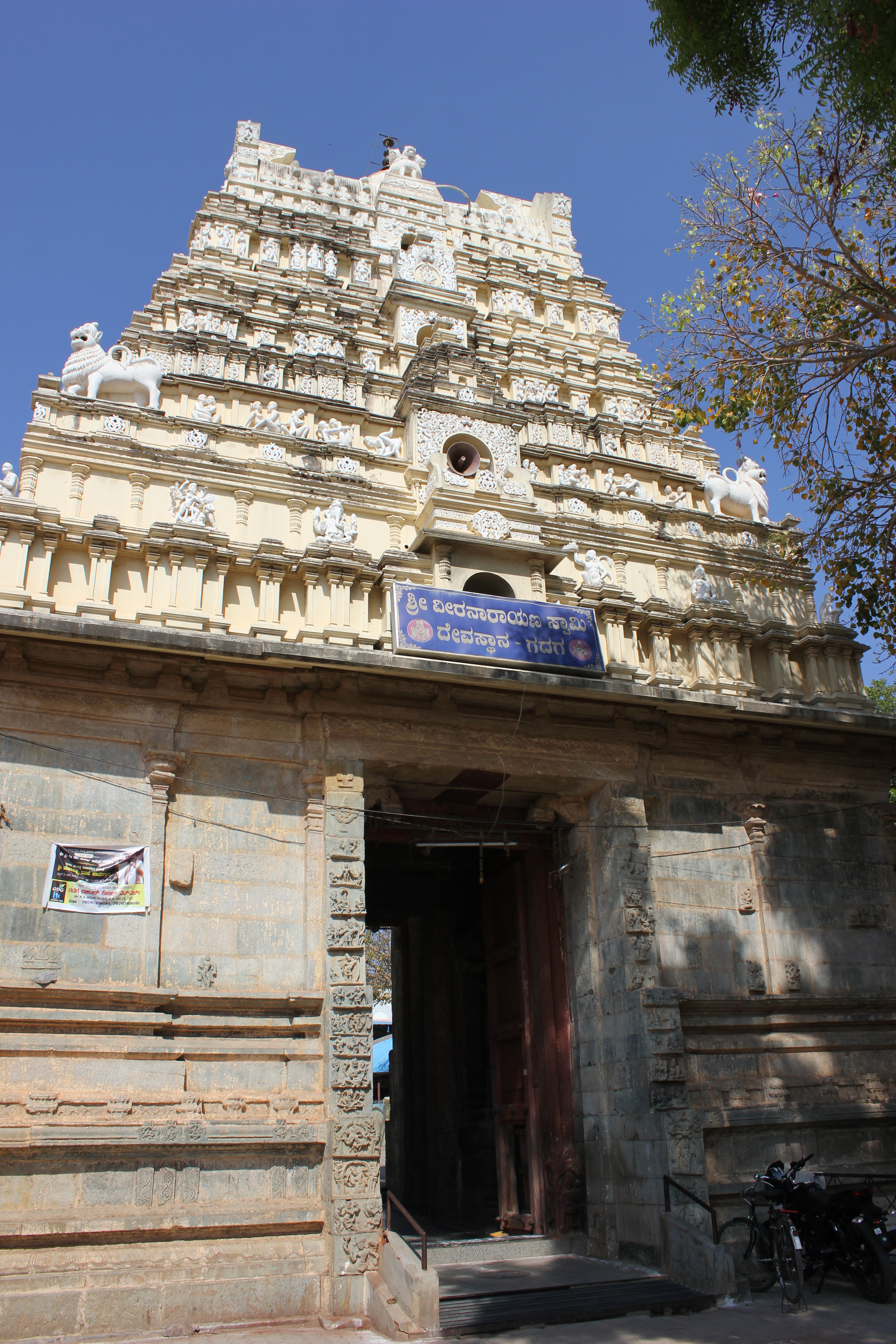
- Dravidian Gopura of Veeranarayana temple

- Location in Karnataka, India
- Coordinates: 15.41°N 75.61°E
- Country: India
- State: Karnataka
- District: Gadag
- Talukas: Gadag

Languages
  - Official: Kannada
- Time zone: UTC+5:30 (IST)

Veeranarayana Temple in Gadag city is a Hindu temple known to have been built around 11th century by the Chalukyas of Kalyani. Gadag city is the administrative headquarters of Gadag district in the state of Karnataka, India. The primary deity in temple is the Hindu god Narayana (also known as Vishnu). The Veeranarayana temple is a protected monument under the Karnataka state division of the Archaeological Survey of India. Priests in the temple are Madhva Brahmins and is under their control.

== History ==
The Veeranarayana temple, Gadag was built during the times of Chalukyas of Kalyani. The temple was completed renovated in 14th century by the kings of Vijayanagara Empire. Prominent Indian scholar-philosopher Ramchandra Dattatreya Ranade also says the Veeranarayana temple of Gadag was built during Chalukya times.

During the Vijayanagar Empire era, according to the scholar D. Sheshagiri Rao, the notable Kannada poet Kumara Vyasa who called Gadag his home and the god Narayana (of Gadag) his favorite deity, wrote his Kannada version of the Hindu epic Mahabharata making adulatory references invariably to the deity of this temple at the end of each canto (sandhi) . During Vijayanagara times this temple was reconsecrated by a Madhwa saint. Legend has it that it was in this temple, at a particular pillar in the hall, that Kumara Vyasa accomplished the epic having received divine inspiration from his deity. The priests in the temple are Madhva Brahmins of Uttaradi Matha. An inscription of c.1539 inscribed during the rule of King Achyuta Deva Raya confirms a gift (Anandanidhi) given by the king to the temple.

== Architecture and sculpture ==
The temple overall reflects multiple architectural idioms - Chalukyas of Kalyani, Hoysala and Vijayanagara. The entrance mahadwara ("main entrance") and gopura ("tower") are in the Vijayanagara style. This leads to a garuda stambha (lit, "eagle pillar") in the courtyard and the ranga mantapa ("gathering hall") which are in Hoysala style. The inner mantapa (hall adjoining the sanctum) is in the Chalukya style. The deity Veeranarayana (lit, "Brave Narayana") is depicted in a standing position, holding the attributes Conch (shanka), Wheel (chakra), Club (gadha) and Lotus (padma) in his four hands. The attire on deity (dhoti) is worn in a veera kaccha ("warrior style") giving the appearance of being "ready for battle". The deity is flanked by his consort Lakshmi and companion Garuda the eagle.

== Gallery ==
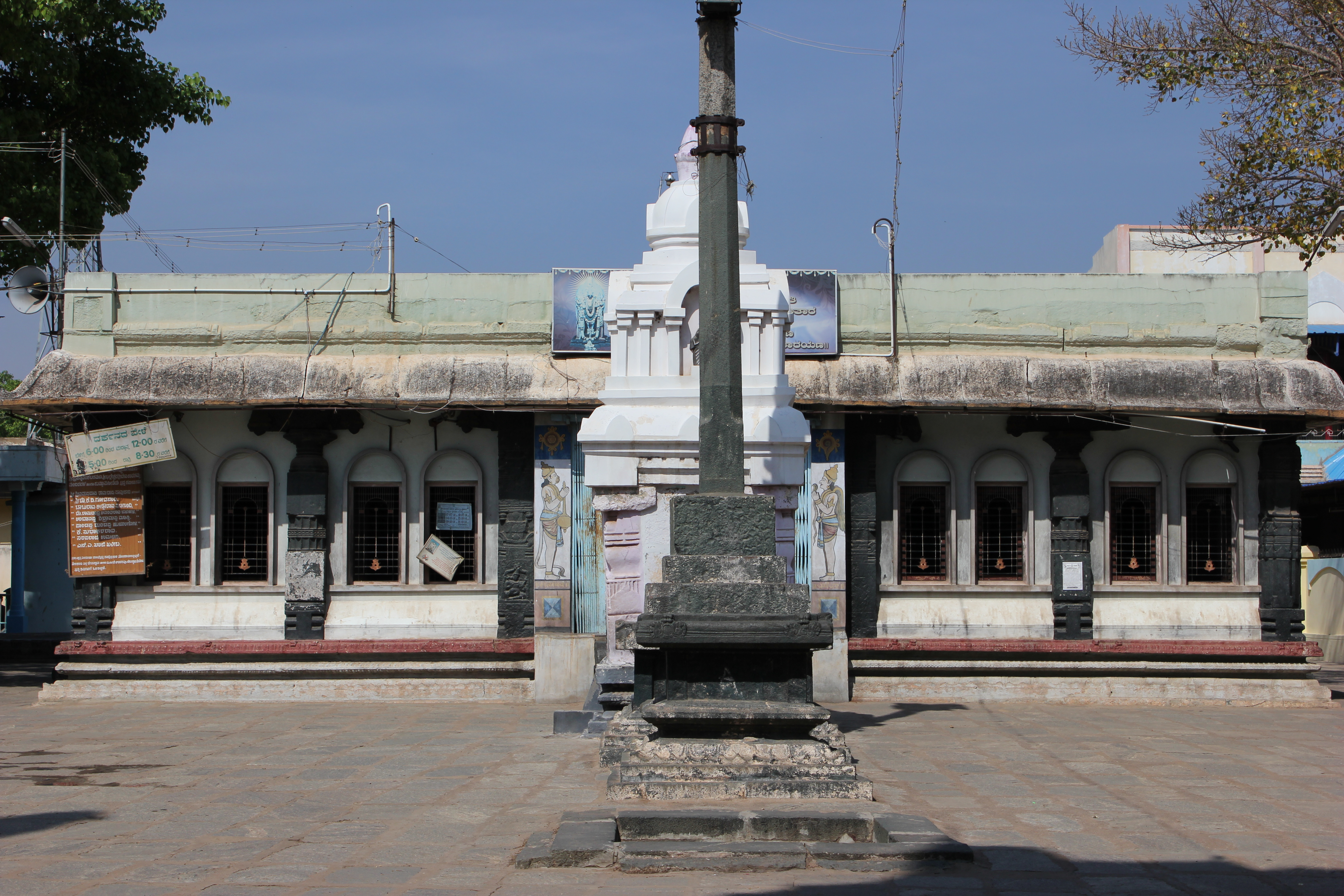
Large mantapa (hall) seen from entrance gopura of the Veeranarayana temple in Gadag

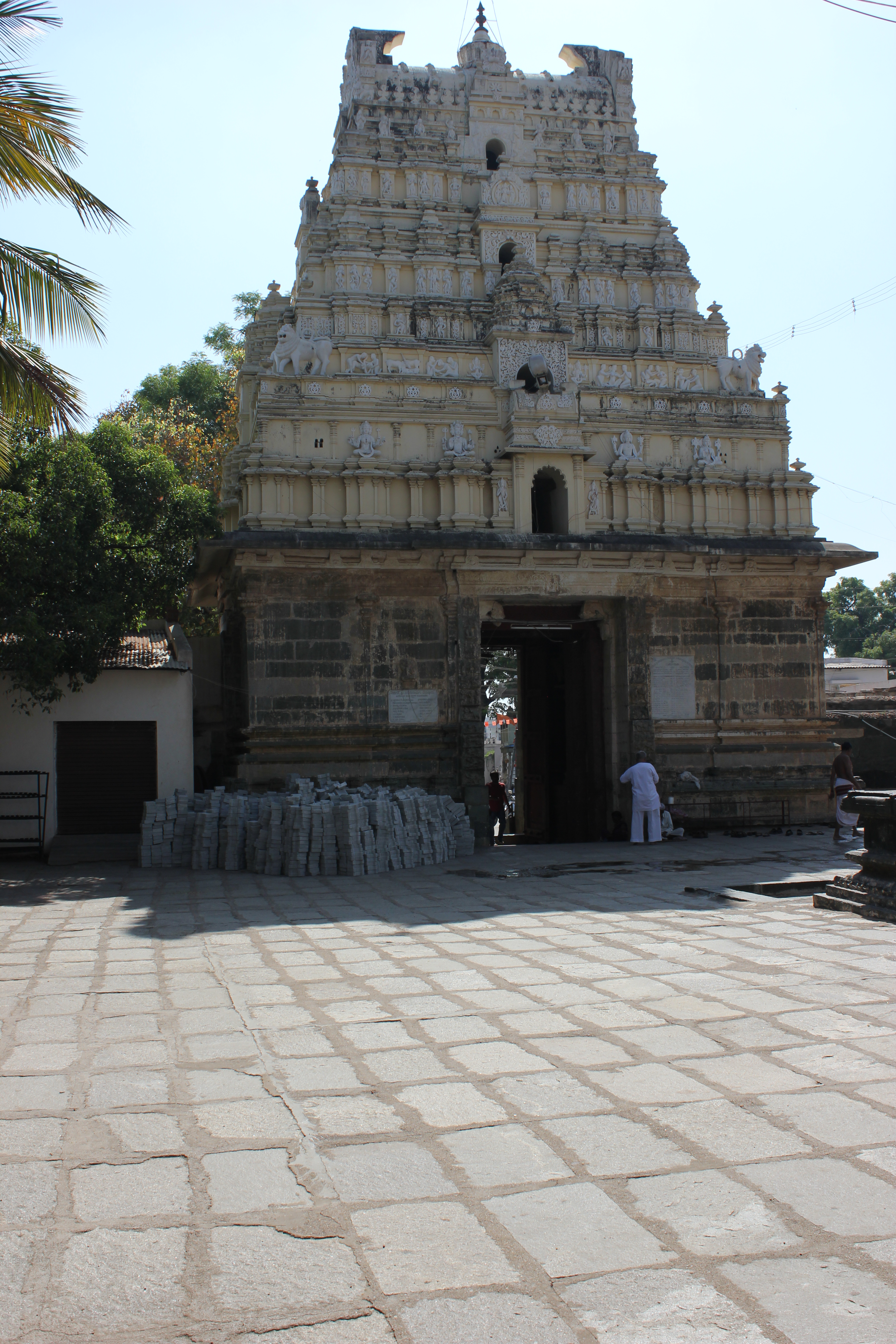
Entrance and gopura seen from the mantapa of the Veeranarayana temple in Gadag

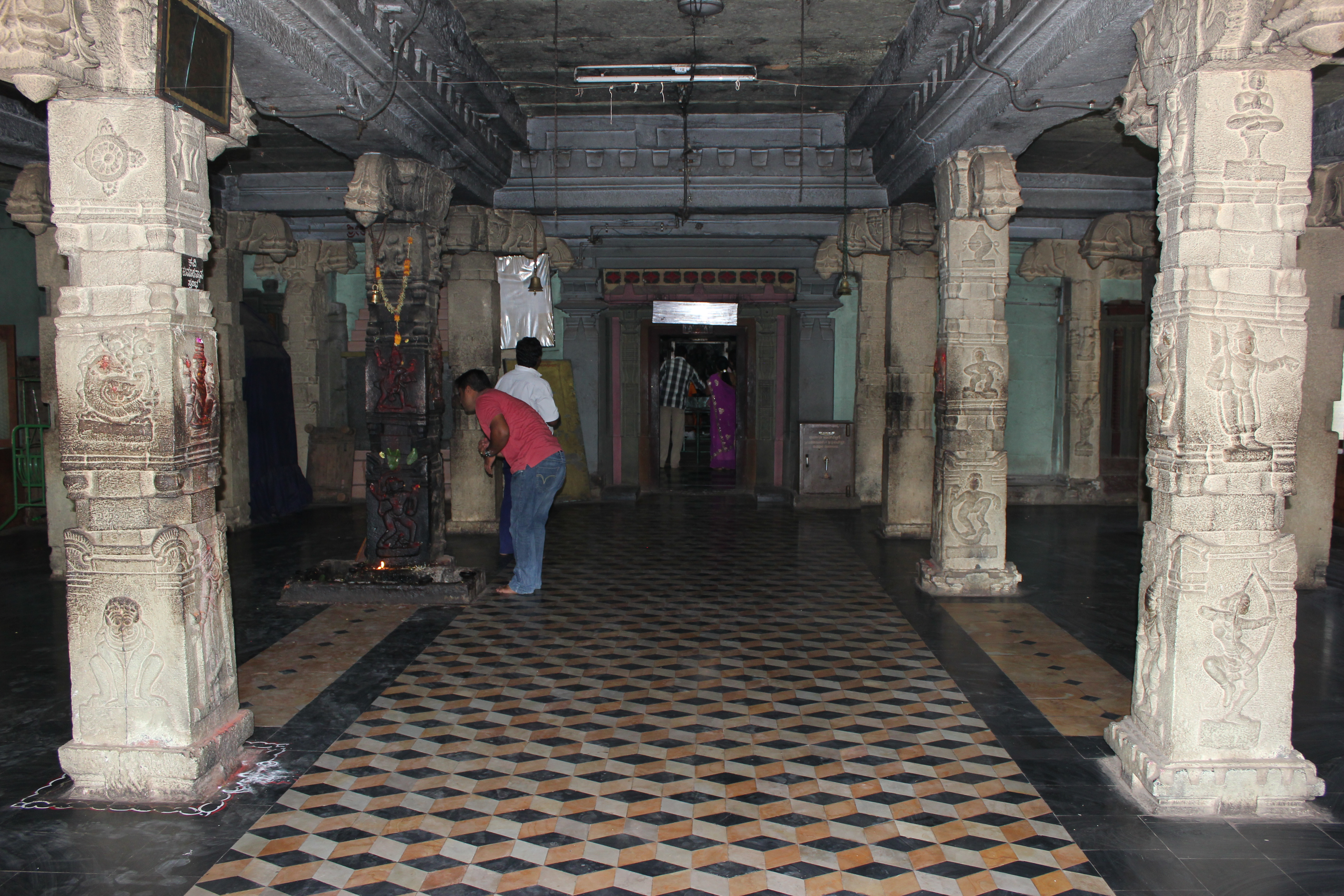
Mahamantapa (large hall) leading to inner mantapa and sanctum of the Veeranarayana temple in Gadag

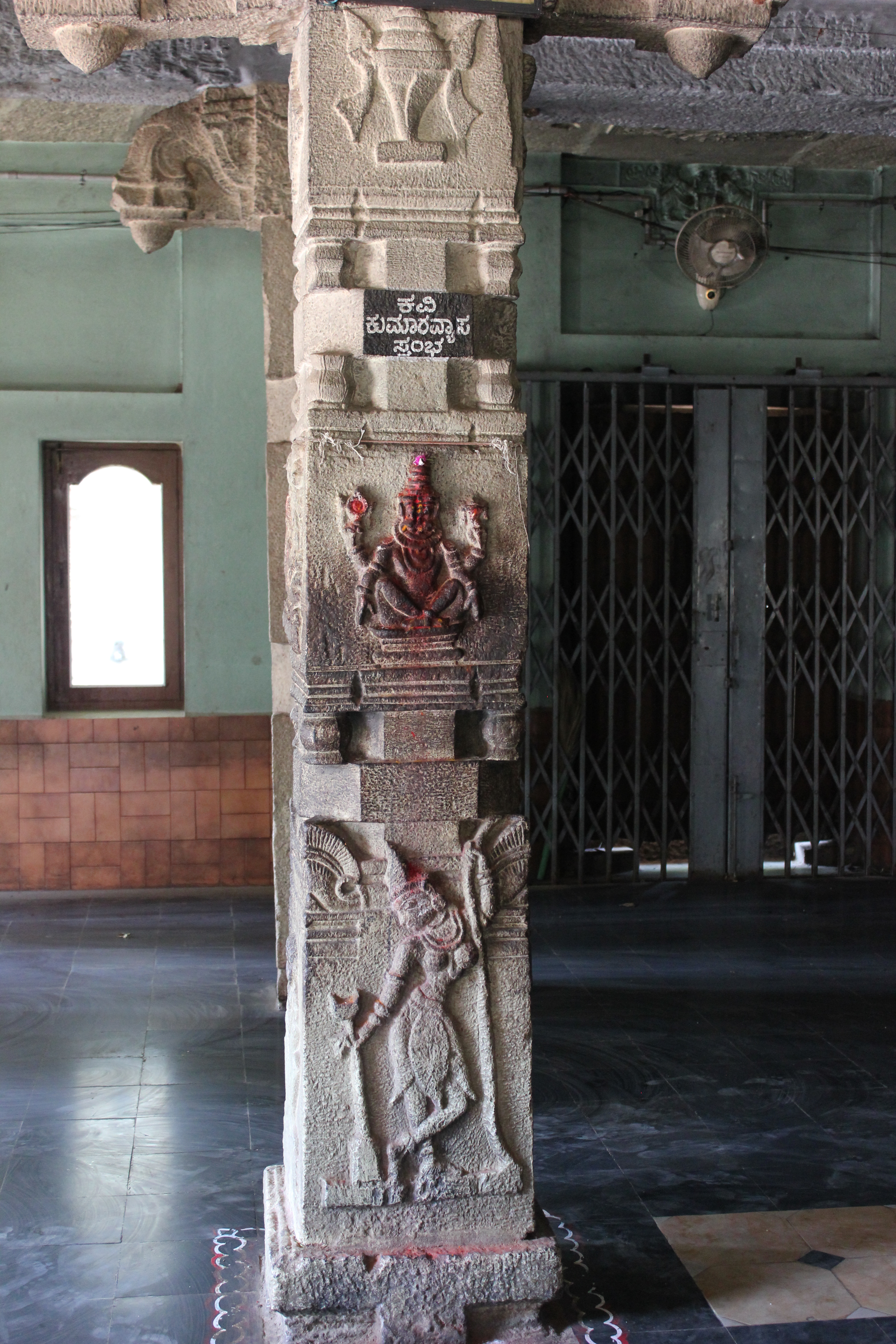
Kumaravyasa's pillar in the large mantapa of the Veeranarayana temple in Gadag, where the noted poet is known to have written his Kannada version of the epic Mahabharata, popularly known as Kumaravyasa Bharata or Gadugina Bharata (c.1425-1450).

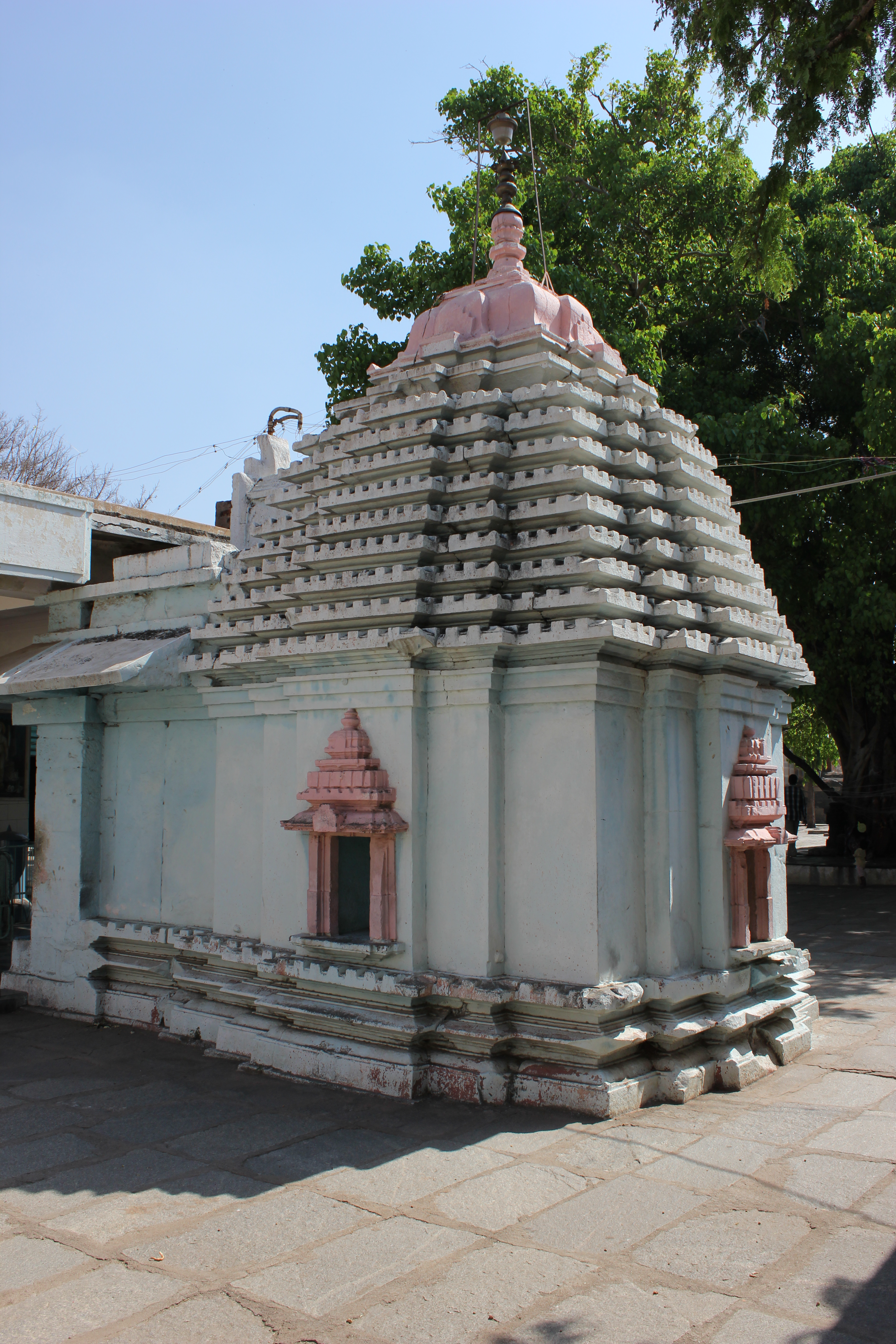
Minor shrine in the prakara (compound) of the Veeranarayana temple in Gadag
