= Sanket =

Sanket may refer to:

- Sanket Bhosale (born 1988), Indian comedian, actor and television presenter
- Sanket J. Bulsara (born 1976), Indian-American judge
- Sanketh Kashi, Indian actor
- Sanket Pathak, Indian television actor
- Sanket Sargar (born 2000), Indian weightlifter
- Hanif Sanket, Bangladeshi television host
- Sanket Phule or Crawford Market, a market in Mumbai, India, named after Indian social reformer Jyotirao Phule

== See also ==
- Sankethi (disambiguation)
- Sanketam, temple land grants in medieval India
