= Koliwad =

- Village
- Country: India
- State: Karnataka
- District: Dharwad
- Taluk: Hubli

Government
  - Type: Panchayat raj
  - Body: Gram panchayat

Area
  - Total: 47 km^{2} (18 sq mi)
- Elevation: 628 m (2,060 ft)

Population (2011)
  - Total: 5,220
  - Density: 112/km^{2} (290/sq mi)

Languages
  - Official: Kannada
- Time zone: UTC+5:30 (IST)
- PIN: 581195
- ISO 3166 code: IN-KA
- Vehicle registration: KA 25
- Website: karnataka.gov.in

Koliwad is a village in the Hubli taluk of Dharwad district in the state of Karnataka, India. Koliwad is the birthplace of Kumaravyasa.

== Demographics ==
As of the 2011 Census of India there were 1,097 households in Koliwad and a total population of 5,220 consisting of 2,634 males and 2,586 females. There were 603 children ages 0-6.

== See also ==
- Annigeri
- Gadag-Betageri
- Karnataka
- Koli people
