= Sevai =

Indian rice noodle

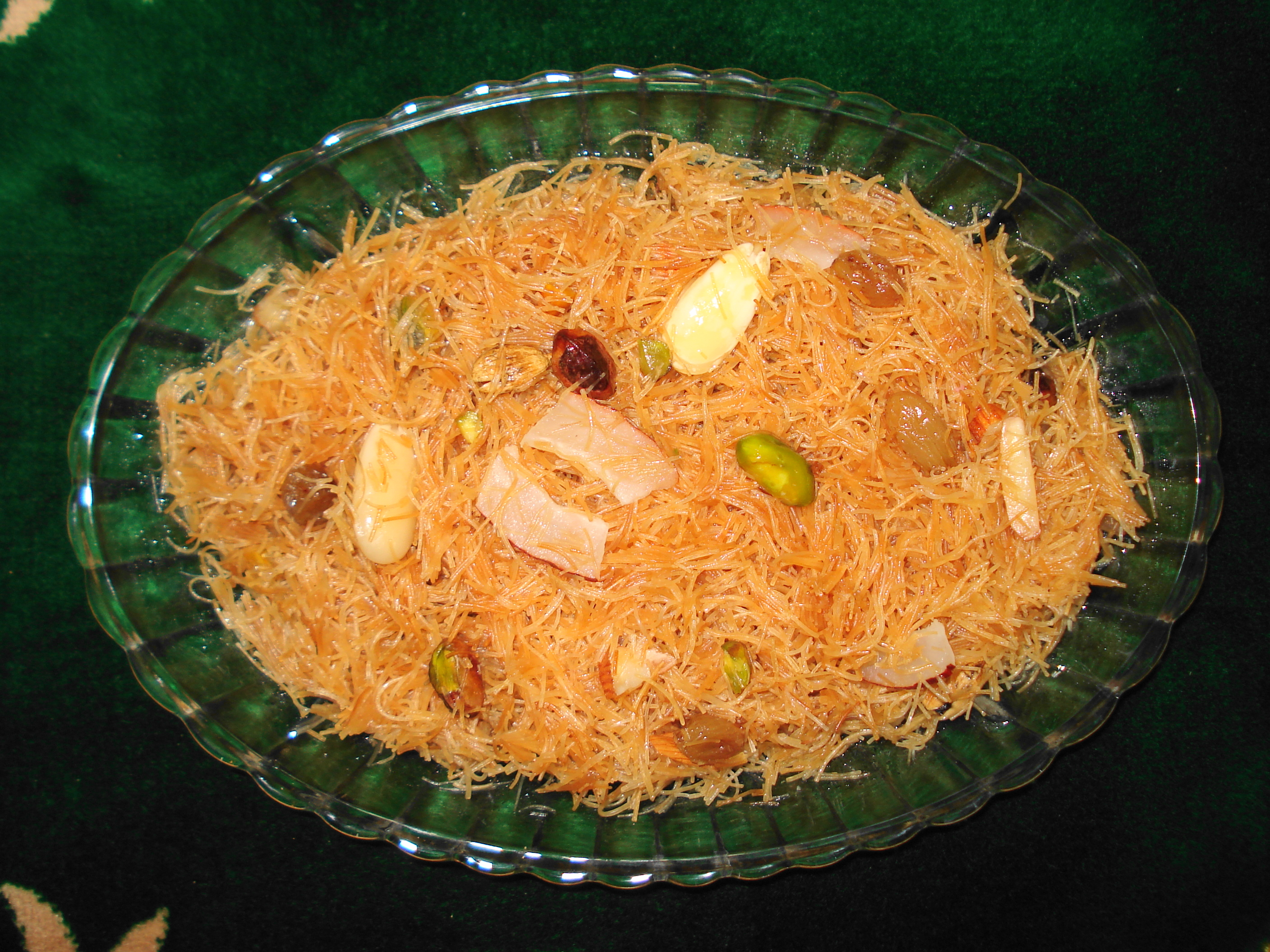
- Alternative names: Shavige
- Type: Rice noodle/rice vermicelli
- Place of origin: India
- Main ingredients: Rice
- Variations: Santhakai

Sevai (Hindi: सेवई), also called shavige, semiya, (Kannada: ಶಾವಿಗೆ), saemia (Telugu: సేమియా) and santhakai (Tamil: சந்தகை), is a type of rice vermicelli dish popular in India. While typically made from rice, varieties made from other food grains like wheat, ragi, and others can also be found.

== History ==
According to food historian K. T. Achaya, references in the Sangam literature mentions sevai and idiyappam around 1st century CE. Lokopakara (1025 CE) a cookbook in Kannada also mentions method of making sevai and a mold-presser used for it.

== Preparation ==
Sevai is mostly made fresh starting from rice grains. It is also prepared from dried sevai packs (or rice sticks). Traditionally, making sevai at home consists of the following steps (with minor variations based on location and family customs):

- Soaking of parboiled rice in cold water for about 3 hours
- Grinding of soaked rice using a wet grinder into a fine paste
- Making of dumplings from the rice paste and steaming the chunks
- Pressing of cooked dumplings into fine strands using a type of sevai press

== Ingredients ==
Homemade sevai is often made from 100% rice (in addition to water and salt) whereas dry rice sticks may have additives like tapioca and corn starch. In Southern parts of Karnataka, shyaavige is made of different grains with different consistencies. When made with ragi or millet the vermicelli is fatter, whereas when made with rice or wheat the strands are thinner.

Sevai can be made as a sweet or savoury dish.

== Sevai versus idiyappam ==
Sevai is similar to idiyappam, in the ingredients and preparation. Sevai, unlike idiyappam, is typically broken or cut up rather than in piles of noodles. In this way, sevai is treated almost as a substitute for rice. Idiyappam, by contrast, is served almost as a substitute for appam with side dishes like curries or kormas.

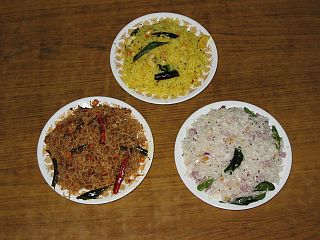
Tamarind, lemon and coconut sevai

The presses used to make sevai and idiyappam are essentially the same. Sevai is also typically not served with curries like other side dishes but rather mixed with a flavoring like lemon, tamarind paste, coconut, or uddina pudi (a type of powder made from black gram dal in Karnataka). Called shavige in Karnataka, it can also be prepared with cooked vegetables and tempered with spices with a dash of lemon juice.

Sevai is typically served in Tamil Nadu and other South Indian communities and in Sri Lanka as a breakfast or tiffin dish, but also served as a dessert such as payasam when cooked in milk with cardamom or other spices and sugar. The cuisine of Kongu region in Tamil Nadu has a variation of this called Santhagai and is included in wedding rituals of the region. In the Malnad region of Karnataka, it may be served with chicken curry, unlike how it is usually served in other parts of South India. Sankethi communities also differ from the norm in that they serve idiyappam like sevai, flavored with lemon, tamarind, or uddina pudi. Other variants of sevai made with ragi, jowar, or other grains are served plain with accompaniments like sweetened coconut milk and various edible powders including powdered chickpea and sesame. In Tamil Nadu, santhakai is often flavoured with lemon, tamarind, tomato, coconut, and curd and is usually eaten warm.

== See also ==
- Indian cuisine
- History of Indian cuisine
- Noodles
- Tamil cuisine
- Jalebi
- Dumpling
