= Shantala Natya Shri Award =

Dance award in Karnataka, India

- Civilian award
- Awarded for: contributions in the field of classical dance
- Sponsored by: Government of Karnataka
- Reward: 0.5 Million Indian rupees
- First award: 1995
- Final award: 2025

Highlights
- First winner: K. Venkatalakshamma
- Last winner: Padmini Ravi

The Shantala Natya Shri Award is an award given every year by the Government of Karnataka to dancers in recognition of their contributions in the field of classical dance. The award is named after Shantala Devi, the consort of Bittideva, a Hoysala ruler of Vishnuvardhana, who was a dancer who made great contributions to classical dance and architecture.

The award consists of a plaque, shawl, garland and cash reward of half a million Indian rupee. It was in 2009, the amount was increased to 5 lakhs.

Since its inception in 1995, the award has been given to a total of 26 individuals. K. Venkatalakshamma was the first dancer to receive the award and the most recent recipient is Revathi Narasimhan, who was awarded in the year 2024.

== Awardees ==
Year	Recipient	Reference
1995	K. Venkatalakshamma	
1996	U. S. Krishnarao, Bangalore	
1997	U.S. Krishnarao, Mangalore	
1998	H. R. Keshava Murthy	
1999	Maya Rao	
2000	Muralidhara Rao	
2001	S. Narmada	
2002	Shachitarao	
2003	C. Radhakrishna	
2004	Jayalakshmi Alva	
2005	Leela Ramanathan	
2006	K. B. Madhav Rao	
2007	T. S. Bhat	
2008	K. M. Raman	
2009	Ullal Mohan Kumar	
2010	Radha Sridhar	
2011	Lalitha Srinivasan, Bangalore	
2012	Vasundhara Doraswamy	
2013	Padmini Priyadarshini	
2014	Vithalashetti, Mangalore	
2015	M. Shakuntala, Bangalore	
2016	Ushadathar, Bangalore	
2017	Nandini Ishwar, Mysore	
2018	B. Bhanumati	
2022-23	Chitra Venugopal	
2023-24	Revathi Narasimhan	
2024-25	Padmini Ravi	
