= B. T. Lalitha Naik =

Indian writer, activist, politician (born 1945)

B.T. Lalita Naik
- Born: Balaji Tangali Lalita Naik; 4 April 1945 (age 81); VL Nagar, Kadur, Karnataka, India
- Occupations: Author, politician, social activist
- Spouse: Champla Naik
- Relatives: K. Venkatalakshamma (grandaunt)
- Writing career
- Notable works: Gati (1986); Banjara Hejjegurutugalu (2009)
- Notable awards: Karnataka Sahitya Academy Award: 1991; Karnataka Rajyotsava Award: 1991
- Movement: Bandaya movement
B. T. Lalitha Naik
Minister of Kannada, Culture & Women and Child Welfare of Karnataka
- In office 1996–1998
Personal details
- Party: All India Mahila Empowerment Party (February 2018 - present)
- Other political affiliations: Janata Dal (United) (until February 2018)

Balaji Tangali Lalitha Naik (born 4 April 1945) is an Indian social activist, politician, writer, film actress who was the minister of Kannada, Culture, and Department of Women & Child Welfare of Karnataka. Naik has also served as an MLC (1986-1992) and MLA (1994-1999). She won the Karnataka Sahitya Academy Award in 1991. She is also known for leading important literary, social and language-rights movements such as Bandaya movement and Gokak agitation.

== Personal life ==
Lalita Naik was born in a Lambani family on 4 April 1945, in Tangali Tanda(now V.L.Nagara), a small village in Kadur, Chikmagalur, to the agriculturalists, (late) Balaji Naik and Ganga Bai.

Naik married Champla Naik in the late 60s and was married to him until his death in 1996. She has three sons from the marriage.

Lalitha Naik is the grand-niece of the renowned Bharatanatyam danseuse K. Venkatalakshamma.

== Writing career ==
After her marriage, Naik, started writing radio plays about the trials and tribulations of middle class life for the local Akashavani station. Encouraged by the popularity she started writing and contributing poems, short stories and articles for prominent Kannada periodicals such as Sudha, Prajavani and Taranga. When her novella, Nele Bele, won an award in the annual novella competition conducted by Sudha magazine, she was invited by the writer P. Lankesh to contribute to his newly started tabloid Lankesh Patrike. Naik started writing regularly for the tabloid and was soon recognized for her sensitivity, social commitment and progressive views. Her popularity as a writer and journalist led her to being nominated as Member of the Karnataka Legislative Council (MLC) by the then Chief Minister Ramakrishna Hegde. Naik continued to write and produce memorable books like the short story collection Habba mattu Bali ("Festival and the Sacrifice"), the novel Gati ("Fate") and the poetry collections, Ide Koogu Matte Matte ("The Same Cry Again and Again") and Bidiru Mele Kantiyali ("In the Bamboo Thicket"). Author of sixteen books, she is also known for her plays, children's fiction and essays. She won the Karnataka Sahitya Academy Award in 1991. Her novel Gati has been translated into English, and her stories and poems have been translated into English, Hindi, Marathi and Telugu languages. Her works are part of the syllabus in several universities in Karnataka.

== Political career ==
While serving as MLC (1986–1992) Naik joined the Janata Dal, inspired by the socialist ideals of Shantaveri Gopala Gowda and Jayaprakash Narayan. In 1994 she was elected MLA from Devadurga constituency, Raichur on a Janata Dal ticket, and was made Minister for Kannada, Culture, and Department of Women & Child Welfare in the J. H. Patel cabinet. Barely two years into her tenure as minister, her son Vishwajit was accused of defiling the statue of B.R. Ambedkar at Dr. B. R. Ambedkar Medical College, Bangalore. Though subsequent investigations revealed the allegations to be baseless, she was forced to step down at that time and Vimalabai Deshmukh succeeded her as Minister for Women and Child Welfare, Karnataka. She also served as the President of Women's Janata Dal. After the split of Janata Dal in 1999 into Janata Dal (Secular) and Janata Dal (United), she joined Janata Dal (Secular) headed by H.D. Deve Gowda. She was a member of its National Executive. Later she quit Janata Dal (Secular) over Gowda's decision to form alliance with Bharatiya Janata Party. She later joined Janata Party, but left it in 2004. Subsequently, she joined the Welfare Party of India and served as its National Vice President. In the 2014 Lok Sabha elections she contested from the Gulbarga constituency on an Aam Aadmi Party ticket and lost to Mallikarjun Kharge.

== Social activism and films ==
Lalitha Naik participated in several social-literary movements of the 1980s including Bandaya movement, a protest movement for social equality and justice, and Gokak agitation. An avowed feminist Lalitha Naik has strongly appealed for the passing of Women's Reservation Bill in both central and state legislatures and urged women to learn martial arts to protect themselves in the prevailing rape culture. She has also lodged her strong protest against the victimization of innocent Muslim youth and social activists fighting for justice like Binayak Sen. She has protested against teaching Bhagavad Gita in schools. She has also demanded for the setting up of a National Men's Commission along the lines of Mahila Ayog to prevent the rising atrocities against men and the unscrupulous use of IPC 498(A), the anti-dowry harassment law which she alleges is often used as a means to blackmail and extort men. She is of the view that reservations should not be permanent.

Naik acted in and wrote dialogues for the Banjara language film, Zadero Pankheru ("Forest Bird") in 1996. She has also acted in films Priya-O-Priya and Ashanti, a tele-serial Mukta Mukta and one telefilm Ondu Hennina Kathe. Naik was president of Karnataka State Bala Bhavana Society and has held other positions in some other community associations and societies. She is a member of Karnataka Film Chambers.

== Awards and honours ==
- 'Best Legislator' honour (1987)
- Karnataka Rajyotsava award (1991)
- Karnataka Sahitya Academy Award for Gati (1991)
- Rajiv Gandhi National Unity Award (1995)
- Mahila Ratna Award (2003)
- Daana Chintamani Attimabbe Award by Karnataka Government (2007)
- Kannada Shree Award (2010)
- Alvas Nudisiri Award (2011)
- Karnataka Choodamani (2011).
- Honorary Doctorate from Kuvempu University in 2009–10.

== Bibliography ==
- Chandraparabhava, collection of radio plays, 1972
- Bhattana Kanasu, stories for children, 1979. (reprinted 1995)
- Nele-Bele, novel, 1982, 1995
- Gati, novel, 1986, 1995
- Habba mattu Bali, stories, 1989, 1995
- Namrupli, poetry, 1983
- Ide Koogu Matte Matte, poetry, 1996
- Odala Bege, poetry, 1996
- Bidiru Male Kantiyali, collected poems 1983-1997
- Devadurga Taluku Darshana, 1986
- Sava-seru, poetry, 2005
- B.T. Lalitha Naik Chutukugalu, 2005
- Kai Hididu Nadesennanu, interviews with centenarians, 2006
- Gadi Kannadigara Kathe-Vyathe, Ed., 2006
- Banjara Hejjegurutugalu, 2009

Translated works

- Gati/Momentum (2013) Translated into English by H.S.M. Prakash. Bangalore: Sirivara Prakashana. ISBN 978-93-81846-46-9
