= K. Venkatalakshamma =

Bharatanatyam dancer (1906–2002)

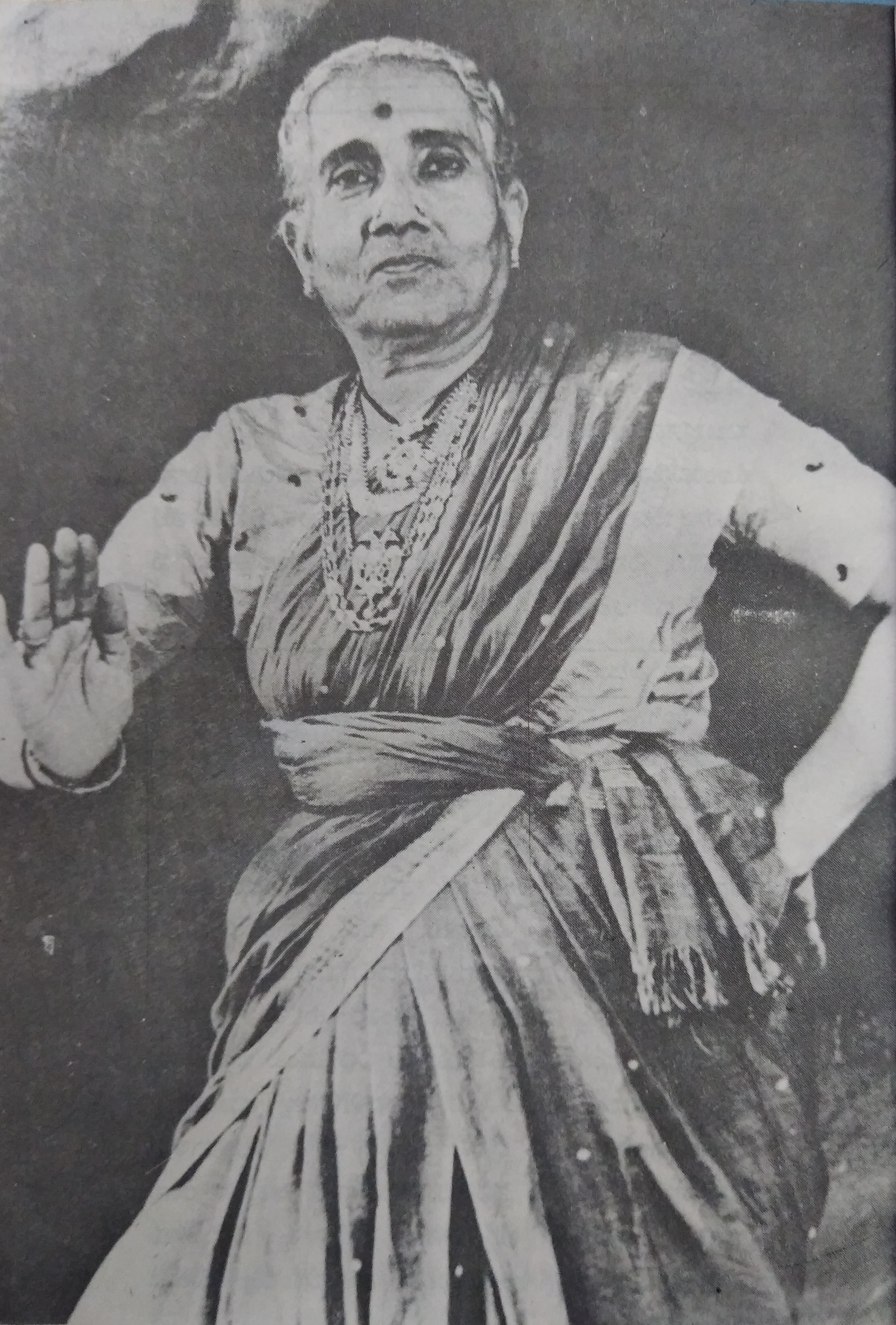
- Born: K.Venkatalakshmma; 29 May 1906; Kadur, Mysore Kingdom, British India
- Died: 1 July 2002 (aged 96); Kadur, Chikmagalur, Karnataka, India
- Years active: 1918-2000
- Awards: Padma Bhushan – 1992; Sangeet Natak Akademi Award – 1964

K. Venkatalakshamma (29 May 1906 – 1 July 2002) was a renowned Bharatanatyam dancer. A doyenne of the Mysore Style of Bharatanatyam, she was the last representative of the Mysore court tradition. She was awarded the Padma Bhushan, India's third highest civilian honour, in 1992.

== Biography ==
=== Early life ===
Venkatalakshamma was born on 29 May 1906 in a Lambani family in Tangali Thanda (Now Venkata Lakshamma Nagara), Kadur. At the age of eight her grandparents took her to the royal court of Mysore to learn Bharatanatyam under the tutelage of the well-known dancer, 'Natya Saraswati' Jatti Thayamma.

Venkatalakshamma learnt the art of dance in the gurukula system and made her ‘Ranga Pravesha’ when she was twelve. She learnt Sanskrit from Asthana Vidwans Devottama Jois, Shanta Shastry and Giri Bhatta, the essential components of Carnatic music from Dr B.Devendrappa and C.Rama Rao and performed with her guru Thayamma for nearly 30 years.

Venkatalakshamma would go to her Guru Thayamma's house in the early morning hours and engage in a series of rigorous exercises, some of which included lifting coins and needles with the eyelids to train the eye muscles for the demands of intricate abhinaya. When it came to performance, aharya did not include heavy make-up or artificial jewellery, and rangapravesha was not a social event as it is now.

=== Career ===
Venkatalakshamma was appointed "Asthana Vidushi," royal court dancer, by the great King Krishnarajendra Wodeyar IV in 1939 and soon she became a household name in the world of Bharatanatyam. She is credited with taking the Mysore style of Bharatanatyam to its zenith. She served as Asthana Vidushi for an incredible 40 years in the courts of Krishnaraja Wodeyar IV and Jayachamarajendra Wodeyar, the last of the Mysore rulers.

After 40 years of service in the palace, Venkatalakshamma, the famous abhinaya exponent, opened her own institution, Bharatiya Nritya Niketana.

When the Faculty of Dance was founded at the University of Mysore in 1965 Venkatalakshamma became its first Reader and retired after serving for nine years in 1974. After her retirement her granddaughter Shakuntalamma served as the Reader. Venkatalakshamma trained a host of dancers from both India and abroad, served as dance teacher and Principal at various institutes including the Nupura School of Bharatanatyam in Bangalore.

=== The Mysore Style ===
The Mysore style of Bharatanatyam started to assume its recognisable form in the nineteenth century under Krishnaraja Wodeyar III, but had begun to flourish during the rule of Chamaraja Wodeyar IX who invited Chinnaiah, one of the brothers of the famous Tanjore Quartet to the Mysore court. Chinnaiah's influence was soon imbibed by the already present dance forms and further shaped a style of Bharatanatyam with an unmistakable flavour of its own.

According to Venkatalakshamma's student Lalitha Srinivasan, rhythmic extravaganza was not entertained at the Mysore court. Instead, the lyrical beauty of the compositions, the melodious music with apt facial expressions and hand gestures was given precedence to, and a rich repertoire of abhinaya numbers developed. This sets the Mysore style apart from the other types of Bharatanatyam. Nritta is a skill one acquires through practice and technique. Abhinaya is the result of the entirety of a dancer's personal views and their innate ability to interpret. It is highly individualistic. Therefore, one can guide a person in abhinaya, but one can never fully teach it.

Venkatalakshamma is the grandaunt of the Kannada writer and politician B.T. Lalitha Naik.

== Awards and honours ==
- Sangeet Natak Akademi Award (its first awardee from Karnataka in 1964)
- Sangeet Nritya Academy Award (1976)
- D.Litt. from Mysore University (1977)
- Kannada Rajyotsava Award (1988)
- Sangeeta Kalaratna (1989) from Bangalore Gayana Samaja
- Padma Bhushan (1992)
- first Shantala Natya Sri Award (the highest award for a dancer in Karnataka: 1995)
- Nadoja Award from University of Hampi (2001)
