= Kumara Vyasa =

Kannada poet

- Born: Naranappa; AD 1419; Koliwad, Dharwad District, Karnataka, India
- Died: 1446
- Occupation: poet

Narayanappa, known by his pen name Kumara Vyasa, was an influential and classical poet of early 15th century in the Kannada language. His pen name is a tribute to his magnum opus, a rendering of the Mahabharata in Kannada. Kumara Vyasa literally means "Junior Vyasa" or "Son of Vyasa" (Vyasa is the title of Krishna Dwaipayana, the author of Mahabharata). He was the contemporary and archrival of the famous Veerashaiva poet laureate Chamarasa who wrote the seminal work Prabhulingaleele covering the lives of Allama Prabhu and other Shiva Sharanas, circa 1435. Both poets worked in the court of Deva Raya II.

== Works ==
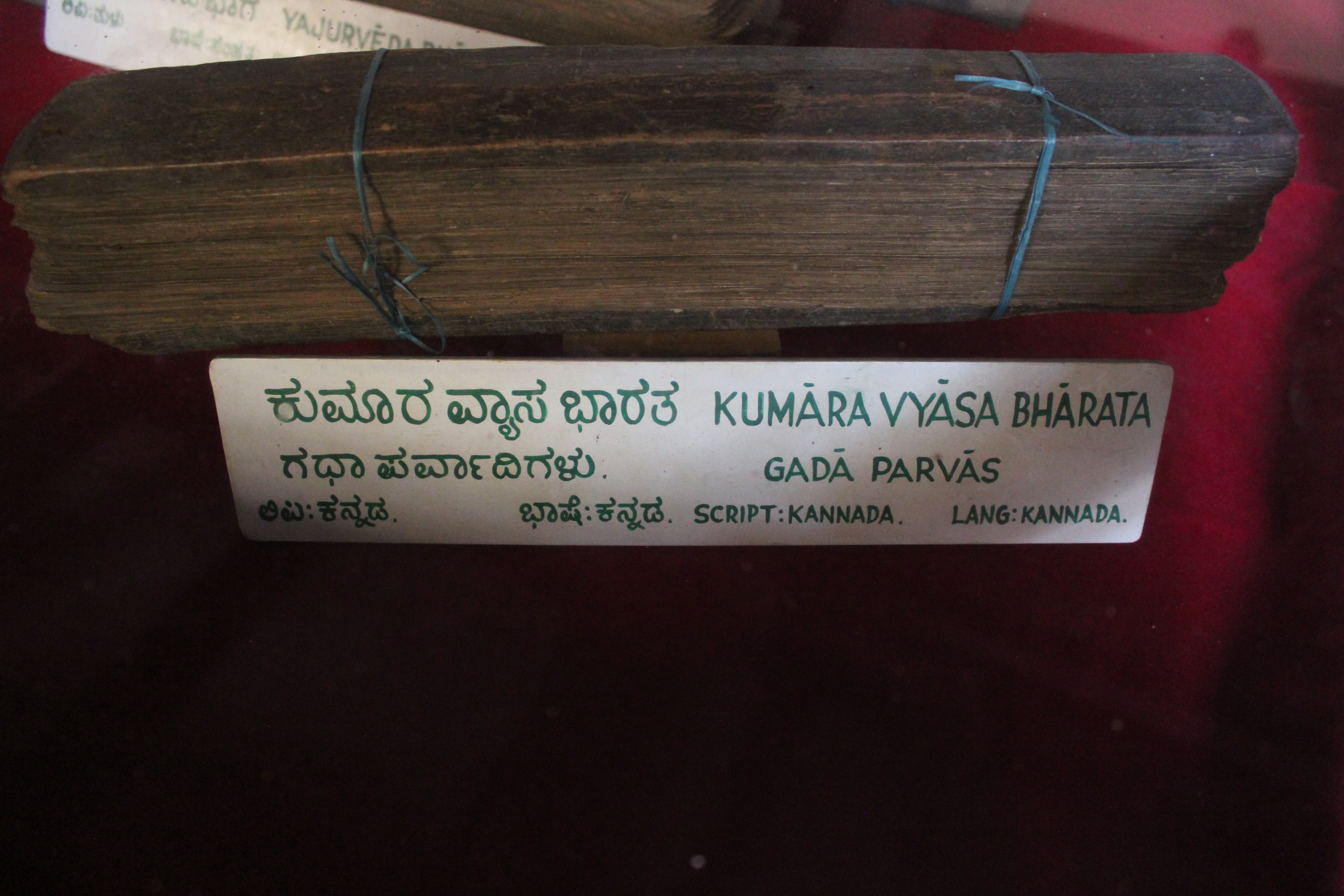
Gada Parva (lit, "Battle of the clubs") section of Kumaravyasa's epic Mahabharata in Kannada dated to c.1425-1450

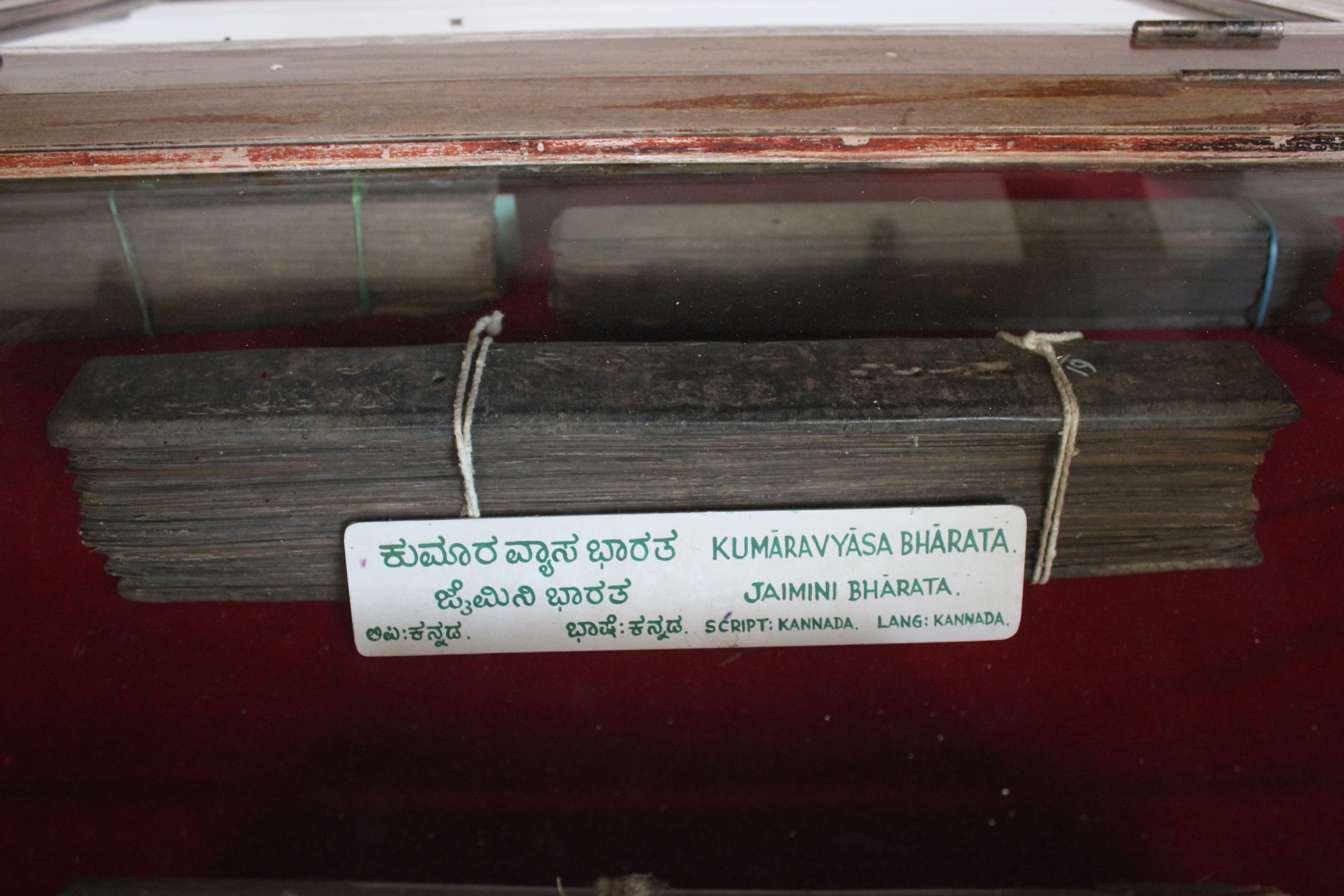
Parts of the Kannada epics-Kumaravyasa's Mahabharata and Lakshmisha's Jaimini Bharata

Kumara Vyasa's most famous work, the Karnata Bharata Kathamanjari (the Mahabharata of Karnataka) is popularly known as Gadugina Bharata and Kumaravyasa Bharata. It is an adaptation of the first ten parvas (chapters) of the Mahabharata. A devotee of Krishna, Kumara Vyasa ends his epic with the coronation of Yudhishthira, the eldest of the Pandavas. The work is celebrated in Kannada literature due to its universal appeal.

Gadugina Bharata is composed in the Bhamini Shatpadi metre, a form of six lined stanzas. Kumara Vyasa explores a wide range of human emotions, examines values, and displays extensive mastery over vocabulary. The work is particularly known for its use of sophisticated metaphors. Kumara Vyasa is also renowned for his characterization. Karnata Bharata Kathamanjari is also known as Dasha Parva Bharata because it originally had only ten parvas as opposed to the eighteen in the original Mahabharata.

Kumara's Kathamanjari covers only up to the Gadayuddha, the battle between Duryodhana and Bheema, and the killing of Duryodhana. The subsequent parts of the original Mahabharata like the Yudhishthira Pattabhishekha, Ashwa Medha Yaaga, and the Swargaarohana Parva are not included.

It may be noted that Lakshmeesha, another great poet who was born a few decades after Kumara's death, took up and completed Ashwa Medha Yaaga parva alone in his work Jaimini Bharata in Kannada. This spiritual work was considered equal to Kathamanjari for its narration.

There is a strong belief among locals that Kumara was a blessed poet of Sri Veera Narayana, another name for Lord Vishnu. The poet sat in front of the sanctum sanctorum in the temple and Narayana himself narrated the story of the ancient Mahabharatha from behind the statue. The poet transformed the story excellent poetry. However, Narayana laid down a condition that Kumara was to only listen to this voice without attempting to see the source or the spirit narrating the story. When the tenth parva of his work was complete, Kumara was deeply curious to see the narrator. Much to his surprise, he saw Narayana himself narrating the story. He also saw a scene of the Kurukshetra War as if it were happening in front of him. However, Kumara had violated the condition that he not search for the source of the voice. At that point, the lord disappeared and the narration of the Mahabharata stopped forever.

Kumara has shown an exemplary writing style in the introduction. He proudly claims that his poetry is matchless and that it caters to the taste of all kinds of readers. He writes that in his poetry "A king enjoys the valor, A brahmin the essence of all vedas, philosopher the ultimate philosophy, ministers and state administrators the tact of rule and Lovers the romantic notes." In addition, he proudly acclaims that this work of his is the "Master of the works of all other great scholars." However, his selflessness may be noted when he says he merely noted all that was narrated by his lord, the actual poet.

Kumara Vyasa's other, lesser-known work is Airavata.

=== Place and time ===
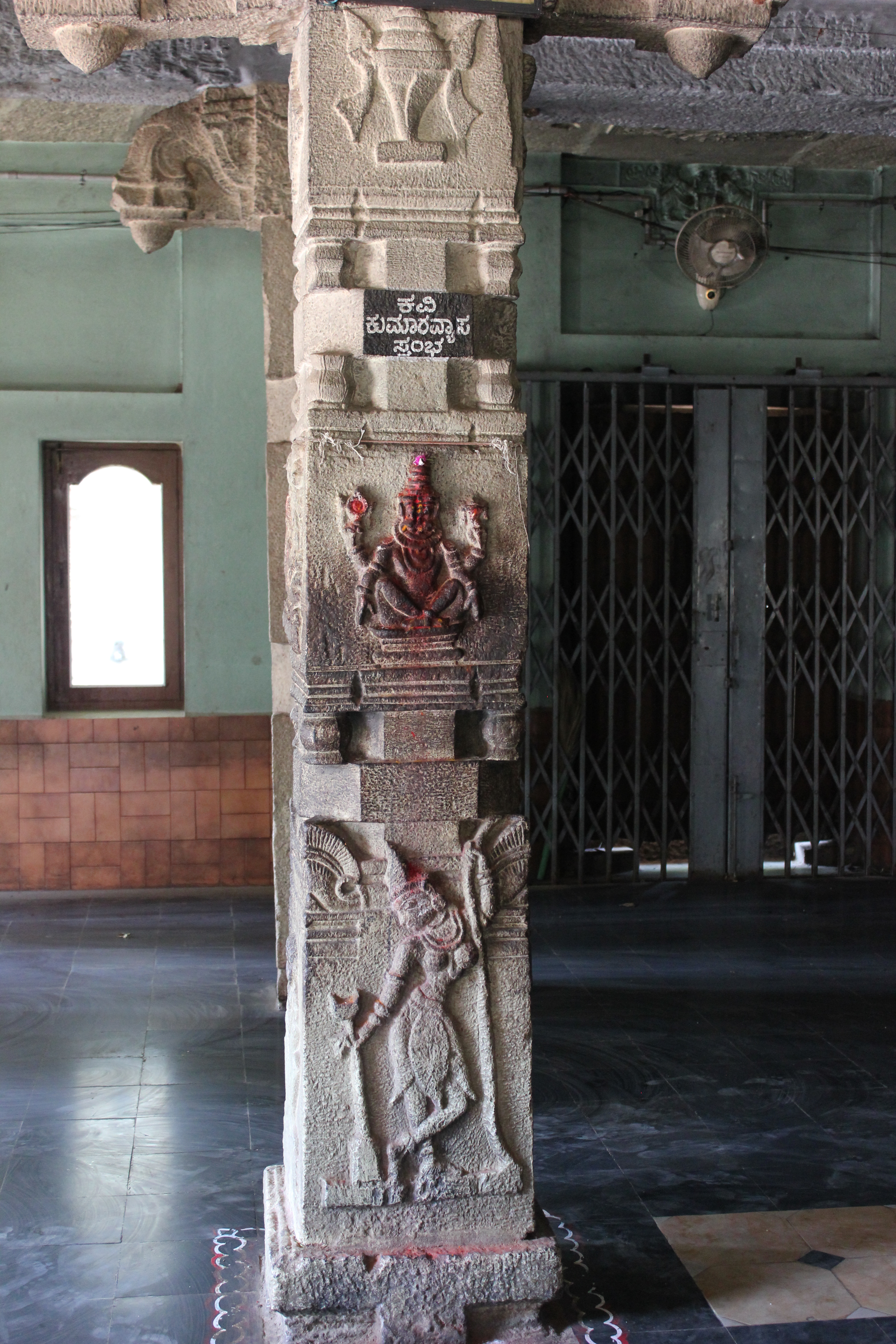
Kumaravyasa Stambha ("Kumaravyasa's Pillar") in the large mantapa of the Veeranarayana temple in Gadag, where Kumara Vyasa is known to have written his epic, the Kumaravyasa Bharata

His magnum opus, Karnata Bharata Kathamanjari, was completed in 1430 when Deva Raya II was ruling the Vijayanagara Empire. Kumara Vyasa earned high esteem as a poet in his court. Kumara Vyasa was mentioned by other prominent 15th century poets, such as Kanaka Dasa and Timmanna Kavi.

Kumara Vyasa lived in Koliwad, a village 35 km (22 mi) from Gadag in North Karnataka. According to popular legend, Kumara Vyasa is said to have composed his work at the Veeranarayana temple in Gadag. A pillar known as Kumara Vyasa's pillar stands in the temple to this day.

== Influence on Kannada literature ==
Kumara Vyasa's works belong to the Nadugannada (Middle-age Kannada) period of Kannada literature. His influence on later Kannada literature is significant. Gadugina Bharata is still widely read. It is popularly sung in a unique style known as Gamaka.

== See also ==
- Kannada literature
- Kannada
