= H. R. Keshava Murthy =

Indian singer (1934–2022)

- Born: 22 February 1934
- Died: 21 December 2022 (aged 88); Hosahalli, Karnataka, India
- Occupation: Singer
- Children: 1
- Awards: See list

H. R. Keshava Murthy (22 February 1934 – 21 December 2022) was an Indian gamaka exponent and guru. He was honoured with Shantala Natya Sri Award by the Government of Karnataka in 1998 and Padma Shri in 2022 by the Government of India in the field of arts.

== Personal life ==
Murthy was born on 22 February 1934 in a family of gamaka artists to Vedabrahma Ramaswamy Shastry. He resided in Hosahalli. He was married and had 1 daughter. He died at his house in Hosahalli on 21 December 2022.

== Career ==
A noted expert in the field of gamaka, Murthy received training in music from his father and later from Venkateshaiah. He publicised Kannada epics Kumaravyasas Bharatha and Jaiminis Bharatha. His variant of music later came to be known as Keshava Murthy gharana.

== Awards ==
Murthy was awarded the Shantala Natya Sri Award in 1998 for his contribution to classical dance by the Government of Karnataka. In 2002, he was awarded the Rajyotsava Prashasti award by the Government of Karnataka. In 2022, the Government of India conferred him with Padma Shri, the country’s fourth highest civilian award, in the field of arts for his contributions to preserve Kavya Vachana, a storytelling in the form of art in Karnataka.
