= Karnata Bharata Kathamanjari =

Kannada version of the Indian epic Mahabharata written by Kumara Vyasa

'Karnata Bharata Kathamanjari (Kannada: ಕರ್ಣಾಟ ಭಾರತ ಕಥಾಮಂಜರಿ) is the Kannada version of the Indian epic Mahabharata, written by Kumara Vyasa during the Vijayanagara Empire. It encompasses the first 10 chapters of the original epic.

The remaining eight chapters that were deliberately left incomplete by Kumara Vyasa were first completed and compiled into the first Kannada translation by Thimmanna Kavi, a court poet of the later Vijayanagara Empire, titled Karnata Krishna Raya Bharata Kathamanjari or simply today as the Krishnaraya Bharata.

In the late 20th century, M. S. Ananthapadmanabha Rao also composed the additional 8 chapters, totaling over eight thousand poems, maintaining the Bhamini Shatpadi style and were compiled as Karnata Bharata Kathamanjari. The compilation was released in 2002. Rao was honored with the Kannada Sahitya Academy award in 1977–78 for his contribution to the Kannada literature.

The poetic style employed in this work is Bhamini Shatpadi, which is prominent in Kannada literature. While the poet relies on the original storyline for most of the work, there are notable deviations, particularly in the portrayal of Karna. The work is famous for the abundance of metaphors, and the poet has been aptly called the king of metaphors.
