= Sankethi Brahmin =

Sankethi people
Total population
- c. 25,000

Regions with significant populations

Languages
- Sanskrit, Kannada, Sankethi

Religion
- Hinduism

Related ethnic groups
- Tamils, Kannadigas

The Sankethi people are a South Indian Smartha Brahmin community located in Karnataka, India, mostly in villages in the south of the state. They speak a Dravidian language known as Sankethi, which is related to Tamil and Kannada. Their traditional occupation is agriculture, engaging in the cultivation of crops such as areca nuts (also known as betel nuts), palm nuts, bananas, and coconuts. The community has traditionally adhered to Advaita Vedanta and maintains the ancient practice of avadhanam, as well as having a long tradition in Carnatic classical music.

The two largest Sankethi groups initially settled predominantly in Kowshika village near Hassan, Karnataka and Bettadapura, Mysore district, and becoming the Kaushika and the Bettadapura communities, respectively.

== History ==
Sankethis venerate a woman known as Nacharu, respectfully called Nacharamma. The appended -amma marks her status as the figurative mother of the Sankethi people, who led them out of Sengottai after mistreatment at the hands of the local Brahmin orthodoxy. Keshaviah refers to her as "... a solitary Brahmana woman leading some 700 or 800 Brahman families from what was their home from time immemorial ...". He also says that "At Alwargurchi, ... we met two very old Brahmanas of Vadama sect who ... afforded additional independent testimony to what we had from so many of our own sect". Several tellings of the story exist within the Sankethi community, as such the exact details are difficult to ascertain.

=== Migration and other history ===
According to Dr. B.S. Pranatartiharan, a researcher in Sankethi studies and writer, the first wave of migration of Sankethis was in 1087 CE and was prompted by the Nacharamma episode. The date of 1087 CE for the first migration suggests that Sankethis fled during the time of the Pandyan Civil War. There is also evidence, according to an inscription preserved in a museum in Shimoga, that the Sankethi community received a land grant from the king of Vijayanagara in 1524 from Krishnadevaraya in recognition of Vedic scholarship.

A schism emerged in the early 20th century as many Indians began to go to Britain in pursuit of higher studies. The more conservative members of the community were strongly against their sons leaving India for study, citing prohibitions against Brahmins travelling by sea. B. K. Narayana Rao sought to study medicine at the Royal College of Surgeons in London and ignored the elders' objections. He opened doors for Indian medical postgraduates to study in Europe, and also modernized Indian eye care in Mysore.

=== Religion ===
The Sankethi community is considered a fairly orthodox Hindu community, having mostly Vedic rites as a part of daily practice, though they do have certain culturally specific practices such as angaḍi habba, vāraturave and kanū habba. Pranatartiharan also reports that Sankethis also have a large variety of family deities, including grāmadevatas like Māramma and Dyāvamma. This is attributed to Sankethis' dissociation from work in temple services, as Sankethis are typically not priests (even in temples which they have built themselves). The Sankethis also have a community deity, known as Vāṇiyamma, who is said to appear in people's dreams and give them sacred missions. Furthermore, the Sankethi community has been open to outside influences, freely incorporating previously not practiced rituals like Caṇdī Homa, which earned the censure of other Brahmin communities for indulging in vāmācāra practices.

The Sankethi community also has an atypical relationship with maṭhas, being historically exempt from paying gurudakṣiṇa to the Śṛṅgeri Śaṅkarācārya due to multiple purported occasions in which Kaushika Sankethis in particular are remembered to have preserved Śrṅgeri Maṭha's reputation without having been formally tied or subordinate to it.

=== Cuisine ===
Sankethi cuisine is not especially distinctive from other southern Karnataka cuisine, though there exists a definite influence from Tamil Nadu and Kerala cuisines. For example, shavige, a popular Sankethi dish is highly similar to idiyappam from Kerala, but is often flavoured like sevai from Tamil Nadu. Sankethis by and large are vegetarians, so their cuisine consists entirely of vegetarian dishes. There is also avial and kutu, two other popular dishes in the Sankethi community, which are also found in Tamil cuisines. Due to their migratory history, influences from all over South India are evident.
