= Sankethi language =

South Dravidian language

Sankethi
- Native to: Karnataka
- Language family: Dravidian: Southern; Southern I; Tamil–Kannada; (disputed); Sankethi
- Early forms: Old Tamil: Middle Tamil

Language codes
- ISO 639-3: –
- Glottolog: sank1249

Sankethi (IPA: [sɐŋkeːt̪i], sometimes spelled Sanketi) is a South Dravidian language that is closely related to Kannada. It is sometimes considered a dialect of Kannada or Tamil, but there are considerable differences that make each language unintelligible to speakers of the other language. It has strong lexical influences from Kannada (particularly in the colloquial form), as well as borrowings from Sanskrit. It is most commonly spoken in Karnataka, India by the Sankethi people, who migrated from Sengottai in Tamil Nadu.

The language is most often written in the Kannada script. However, Sankethi (especially in the spoken form) has relatively higher frequencies of consonant clusters of more than two consonants and semivowels. This makes it difficult to write in the Kannada script, which would require multiple subscripted letters (ಒತ್ತಕ್ಷರ - ottakṣara). As a result, Sankethi is rarely found in printed or any written form, and has no standardized form.

Three main dialects exist of the Sankethi language: Kaushika, Bettadpura and Lingadahalli, each associated with the three primary Sankethi communities located in Karnataka. These dialects are all located in a sprachbund which includes not only Kannada but also Tulu, due to Sankethi villages being located in the Malnad region. As Sankethi has no standardized form, it can be difficult to assess what the "true" grammar and features of Sankethi is, as evidenced in the literature by H.S. Ananthanaryana and Kikkeri Narayana. The grammar and semantic features of Kannada are those most often assimilated into Sankethi, as many Sankethis are bilingual in Kannada.

== Phonology ==
Sankethi phonology is very similar to Kannada and Tamil, with the classical Sanskrit aspirates and retroflex laterals characteristic of many Dravidian languages. Like a few other South Indian languages including Konkani, Marathi, and Saurashtra, the language has a few uncommon aspirates: [ʋʰ], [nʰ], and [ʃʰ], though both most often appear in their palatalized forms. Its presence is often marked by the presence of long vowels, as well as syllable finally (where they are often palatalized in that position). See the table below for the range of Sankethi consonants.

| | | Labial | | Dental | | Alveolar | Retroflex | | Palatal | | Velar | | Glottal |
|---|---|---|---|---|---|---|---|---|---|---|---|---|---|
| Nasal | plain | m ಮ ⟨m⟩ | | n̪ ನ ⟨n⟩ | | | ɳ ಣ ⟨ṇ⟩ | | ɲ ಞ ⟨ñ⟩ | | ŋ ಙ ⟨ṅ⟩ | | |
| Nasal | aspirated | | | n̪ʰ ನ್ಹ ⟨nʰ⟩ | | | | | | | | | |
| Stop | plain | p ಪ ⟨p⟩ | b ಬ ⟨b⟩ | t̪ ತ ⟨t⟩ | d̪ ದ ⟨d⟩ | | ʈ ಟ ⟨ṭ⟩ | ɖ ಡ ⟨ḍ⟩ | t͡ʃ ಚ ⟨c⟩ | d͡ʒ ಜ ⟨j⟩ | k ಕ ⟨k⟩ | ɡ ಗ ⟨g⟩ | |
| Stop | aspirated | pʰ ಫ ⟨ph⟩ | bʱ ಭ ⟨bh⟩ | t̪ʰ ಥ ⟨th⟩ | d̪ʱ ಧ ⟨dh⟩ | | ʈʰ ಠ ⟨ṭh⟩ | ɖʱ ಢ ⟨ḍh⟩ | t͡ʃʰ ಛ ⟨ch⟩ | d͡ʒʱ ಝ ⟨jh⟩ | kʰ ಖ ⟨kh⟩ | ɡʱ ಘ ⟨gh⟩ | |
| Fricative | | | | s̪ ಸ ⟨s⟩ | | | ʂ ಷ ⟨ṣ⟩ | | ʃ ಶ ⟨ś⟩ | | | | h ಹ ⟨h⟩ |
| Fricative | aspirated | | | | | | | | ʃʰ ಶ್ಹ ⟨śh⟩ | | | | |
| Approximant | central | ʋ ವ ⟨v⟩ | | | | | | | j ಯ ⟨y⟩ | | | | |
| Approximant | aspirated | ʋʰ ವ್ಹ ⟨vh⟩ | | | | | | | | | | | |
| Approximant | lateral | | | | | l ಲ ⟨l⟩ | ɭ ಳ ⟨ḷ⟩ | | | | | | |
| Rhotic | | | | | | r ರ ⟨r⟩ | | | | | | | |

Sankethi vowels are very similar to Tamil and Kannada vowels:

| Vowel | ISO 15919 | IPA |
|---|---|---|
| ಅ | a | [ʌ] |
| ಆ | ā | [ɑː] |
| ಇ | i | [i] |
| ಈ | ī | [iː] |
| ಉ | u | [u], [ɯ] |
| ಊ | ū | [uː] |
| ಎ | e | [e] |
| ಏ | ē | [eː] |
| ಐ | ai | [ʌj] |
| ಒ | o | [o] |
| ಓ | ō | [oː] |
| ಔ | au | [ʌʋ] |

In Sankethi, some nouns that end in ಒ (o) have a final nasal sound, which is not indicated with the anusvāra when written down. This is especially prevalent in the Lingadahalli dialect.

== Vocabulary ==
Below is a table comparing some basic words in Sankethi, Kannada, Tamil and Thigala.

| Sankethi | Kannada | Tamil | Thigala | English |
|---|---|---|---|---|
| ಪಲ್ಯು/ತಾಳ್ದು (palyu/tāḷdu) | ಪಲ್ಯ (palya) | பொரியல் (poriyal) | ಪಲ್ಯು (palyu) | sauteed/fried vegetable dish |
| ಚಾರು (cāru) | ಸಾರು (sāru) | ரசம் (rasam) | ಸಾರು (sāru) | broth/soup |
| ತಯಿರು (tayiru) | ಮೊಸರು (mosaru) | தயிர் (tayir) | ತಯಿರು (tayiru) | curd / yoghurt |
| ಮೋರು (mōru) | ಮಜ್ಜಿಗೆ (majjige) | மோர் (mōr) | ಮೋರು (mōru) | buttermilk |
| ನೆಲ್ಲ್ (nell) | ಭತ್ತ (bhatta) | நெல் (nel) | ನೆಲ್ಲ್ (nell) | unhusked rice |
| ಅರಶಿ (araśi) | ಅಕ್ಕಿ (akki) | அரிசி (arici) | ಅರಶಿ (araśi) | uncooked rice |
| ಸಾಂ (sāṃ) | ಅನ್ನ(anna) | சாதம்(sādam) | | cooked rice |
| ತೇನು (tēnu) | ಜೇನಿನತುಪ್ಪ (jēnina tuppa) | தேன் (tēn) | ತೇನು (tēnu) | honey |
| ವಣ್ಣ (vaṇṇa) | ಬೆಣ್ಣೆ (beṇṇe) | வெண்ணெய் (veṇṇey) | ವಣ್ (vaṇ) | butter |
| ನೈ (nai) | ತುಪ್ಪ (tuppa) | நெய் (ney) | | ghee |
| ವೆಲ್ಲು (vellu) | ಬೆಲ್ಲ (bella) | வெல்லம் (vellam) | | jaggery |
| ಮಂಜ (mañja) | ಅರಶಿನ (araśina) | மஞ்சள் (maṇjaḷ) | | turmeric |
| ಪರ್ಪು (parpu) | ಬೇಳೆ (bēḷe) | பருப்பு (paruppu) | | lentil |
| ಕಾವೇರಿ (kāvēri) | ನದಿ (nadi) | ஆறு (āṟu), நதி (nati) | | river |

=== Word formation strategies ===
One peculiar feature of Sankethi is its use of words and structures of both Sanskrit and Dravidian origin to form new words. A study by H.S. Ananthanarayana details a number of noun formation strategies in Sankethi.

-ಮಯು - "full of" (ex. ಪೂವಮಯು - full of flowers)

== Grammar ==
Nouns

Sankethi grammar is fairly similar to those of most other Dravidian languages, with six cases: nominative (unmarked), accusative, instrumental-ablative, dative, genitive, and locative. The vocative is not fully functional case, and not all nouns have a separate form for it, and as such is not included in the traditional list. The grammar detailed below pertains to the Kaushika dialect.

As in Tamil and Malayalam, there is clusivity distinction for first person plural pronouns in Sankethi: ನಾಂಗ (nānga; exclusive) VS ನಾಂಬು (nāmbu/ inclusive), though the frequency usage varies. A good example of its usage is the Sankethi endonym for the language: ಎಂಗಡೆ ವಾರ್ಥೆ (eṃgaḍe vārthe), which implies that the language belongs to the speaker and the Sankethi community, so as to distinguish it from a shared language.

Below is a table of pronouns:

| ನಾ - na - I | ನಾಂಗ/ನಾಂಬ - nānga/nāṃba - we (exclusive/inclusive) |
| ನೀ - ni - you | ನೀಂಗ/ತಾಂಗ - nīnga/tānga - (you all/you (polite))/you (very polite) |
| (ಇವು/ಅವು)/(ಇವೆ/ಅವೆ) - (ivu/avu)/(ive/ave) - (proximal/distal) he/she | ಇವ್ಹಾ(ಳು)/ಅವ್ಹ(ಳು)- ivhāḷu/avhāḷu- they (human) |
| ಇದು/ಅದು- idu/adu - this/that (non-human) (it/[this/that]) | ಇವ್ಹ್ಯ/ಅವ್ಹ್ಯ - ivhya/avhya - they (non-human) |

Polite versions of he and she are ಇವ್ಹು/ಅವ್ಹು (ivhu/avhu) and ಇವ್ಹೆ/ಅವ್ಹೆ (ivhe/avhe), which are increasingly considered archaic. They are most frequently replaced by ಇವ್ಹಾ/ಅವ್ಹಾ (ivhā/avhā), perhaps as an influence from Kannada. Tānga is usually found only in religious contexts, and even then, nīnga is often preferred. Tānga and nīnga have the same inflections and verb conjugations. The use of ಇವ್ಹ್ಯ/ಅವ್ಹ್ಯ is rare, since the word was historically used to refer to people outside the Sankethi community. Eventually it acquired a more general, pejorative meaning of “those people (outsiders)”, and as such is rarely used.

Case Declension

The declensional classes are similar to Kannada, marked by animate versus inanimate and weak (ಇ, ಈ, ಎ, ಏ, ಐ) versus strong vowel (ಅ, ಆ, ಉ, ಊ, ಒ, ಓ, ಔ, ಋ) endings. Gender only exists for human nouns, and is only relevant in the third person verb conjugations. Generally, the verb classes are delineated as 1st (animate strong vowel ending), 2nd (inanimate strong vowel ending), 3rd (animate weak vowel ending), and 4th (inanimate weak vowel ending).

Though Sankethi vocabulary is not systematized, there are some general rules for taking nouns from Sanskrit, Tamil, Kannada, or Malayalam.

- Most words of Dravidian origin in Kannada that end in ಅ (a) in Kannada and Tamil/Malayalam words ending in உ/ന് (the half u), including proper nouns, end in the half ಉ [ɯ] in Sankethi.
- Words of Sanskrit origin (though there are exceptions) tend to end in ಒ (oṃ); a way to tell if this is the case is to see if the Telugu, Tamil, or Malayalam cognate ends in the anusvāra (the ṃ) or the ending -am. If it does, the word will most likely end in the nasalized oṃ, which is usually written with ಒ because there is no way to indicate a nasalized vowel in the Kannada script (as noted before). Ex. Sankethi ಪಳೊ is related to Tamil பழம், which ends in -am. Therefore, ಪಳೊ is pronounced with a final ಒಂ.
- However, as a rule, most words that end in e in Kannada and ai in Tamil end in a in Sankethi (even if the second rule applies; is especially true of Sanskrit loans). Ex. Compare Kannada ಪ್ರಾರ್ಥನೆ (prārthane) and Tamil பிரார்த்தனை (prārthanai), which is ಪ್ರಾರ್ಥನ (prārthana) in Sankethi.

See the table below for case declensions. The nominative is the base form of a given noun, and as such is not included in the table below.

| Case | 1st Class | 2nd Class | 3rd Class | 4th Class |
| Accusative | -ಅ/-ನ್ (singular) -ಅಂಗಳ (plural) | -ತ | -ಯ | -ವ |
| Instrumental-Ablative | -ೊಣ್ಣು/- ್ನಣ್ಣು (singular) -ಂಗಳಣ್ಣು (plural) | -ತಣ್ಣು | -ಯಣ್ಣು | -ಅಣ್ಣು |
| Dative | -ಂಕ್ಕು(singular) -ಗಳಕ್ಕು(plural) | -ತಕ್ಕು | -ಕ್ಕು | -ಅಕ್ಕಾಹ |
| Genitive | -ಂದು/ಂದೆ (singular) -ಗಡು/ಗಡೆ (plural) | -ತದು/ತದೆ/ತೆ | -ಂದು/ಂದೆ | -ಅದು/ಅದೆ/ಅತ್ತೆ/ಅತ್ತು |
| Locative | ್ನಲ್ಲೆ (singular); -ಂಗಳಲ್ಲೆ (plural) | -ತಲ್ಲೆ | -(ಯ)ಲ್ಲೆ | -ಅಲ್ಲೆ |

Verbs

Verbs in Sankethi have two kinds of verbs stems. There are verbs that end in ಉ/ಒ (u/o) and ಇ/ಎ (i/e). Generally speaking, they undergo the following changes during conjugation

- -ಉ/ಒ verbs (strong vowel stems) simply drop their final vowel before taking endings
- -ಇ/ಎ verbs (weak vowel stems) add the euphonic ಯ್ (y) before adding the endings. However, in speech, the ಎ is reduced to ಇ, and even then the final vowel disappears, resulting in a palatalized consonant between the stem and ending.

Below are tables that show different tenses, given for the verb ಸಾಪಡು (to eat/drink):

Non-Past Simple

| ನಾ ಸಾಪಡಣಿ - nā sāpaḍaṇi | ಅದು ಸಾಪಡಂದು - adu sāpaḍandu |
| *ನೀ ಸಾಪಡಂಡ್ಯ/ಸಾಪಡಾಂದೆಯ - nī sapaḍaṇḍya/sāpaḍāṇdeyā (statement/question) | ನಾಂಗ ಸಾಪಡಣೂಂ/ಸಾಪಡಣೊ - nanga sāpaḍaṇūṃ/sāpaḍaṇo |
| ಅವು ಸಾಪಡಣ/ಸಾಪಡಣು - avu sāpaḍaṇa | *ನೀಂಗ ಸಾಪಡಂಢ್ಯೊ/ಸಾಪಡಂಢಿಳ - nīnga sāpaḍaṇḍhyo/sāpaḍaṇḍhiḷa (statement/question) |
| ಅವೆ ಸಾಪಡಂಡ - ave sāpaḍaṇḍa | ಅವ್ಹಾಳ ಸಾಪಡಂಡ - avhāḷa sāpaḍaṇḍa |

*In all tenses, the ನೀ form's final -್ಯ (-ya) becomes -ಎಯ (-eya) as a question, and the ನೀಂಗ form changes from -್ಯೊ (-yo) to -ಿಳ (-iḷa) as a question.

Imperfective and Perfective Aspects

The imperfective aspect is marked by taking the gerundial form of a verb (the stem takes the ending -āṇḍu), and then attaching the conjugated form of iru in its auxiliary form (rāṇi, rāṇḍeya, etc.).

| ನಾ ಸಾಪಡಾಂಡ್ರಾಣಿ- nā sāpaḍānḍrāṇi | ಅದು ಸಾಪಡಾಂಡ್ರಾಂದು - adu sāpaḍānḍrāndu |
| ನೀ ಸಾಪಡಾಂಡ್ರಾಂಡ್ಯ - nī sāpaḍāṇḍrānḍya | ನಾಂಗ ಸಾಪಡಾಂಡ್ರಾಣೂಂ- nanga sāpaḍānḍrāṇūṃ |
| ಅವುಸಾಪಡಾಂಡ್ರಾಣು - avu sāpaḍāṇḍrāṇu | ನೀಂಗ ಸಾಪಡಾಂಡ್ರಾಂಢ್ಯೊ- nīnga sāpaḍāṇḍrānḍhyo |
| ಅವೆ ಸಾಪಡಡ್ರಾಂಡ - ave sāpaḍāṇḍrānḍa | ಅವ್ಹಾಳ ಸಾಪಡಾಂಡ್ರಾಂಡ - avhāḷa sāpaḍāṇḍrānḍa |

This is contrasted with the perfect aspect, where the past participle is placed first instead of the gerundial aspect. In addition, because

| ನಾ ಸಾಪಡ್ರಾಣಿ- nā sāpaḍrāṇi | ಅದು ಸಾಪಡ್ರಾಂದು - adu sāpaḍrāndu |
| ನೀ ಸಾಪಡ್ರಾಂಡ್ಯ - nī sāpaḍrānḍya | ನಾಂಗ ಸಾಪಡ್ರಾಣೂಂ- nanga sāpaḍrāṇūṃ |
| ಅವುಸಾಪಡ್ರಾಣು - avu sāpaḍrāṇu | ನೀಂಗ ಸಾಪಡ್ರಾಂಢ್ಯೊ- nīnga sāpaḍrānḍhyo |
| ಅವೆ ಸಾಪಡ್ರಾಂಡ - ave sāpaḍrānḍa | ಅವ್ಹಾಳ ಸಾಪಡ್ರಾಂಡ - avhāḷa sāpaḍrānḍa |

Past

The past tense in Sankethi is complex due to a number of stem rules inherited from Tamil. The past tense is also notable in that the ನೀಂಗ (nīnga) form is where Sankethi's uncommon aspirates are most visible. There a number of different kinds of past tense endings associated with certain verb endings. There are also a number of irregular verbs, with no necessarily discernible pattern.

ಪಣ್ಣು - -ಉ ending verbs

| ನಾ ಪಣ್ಣಿನೆ - nā paṇṇine | ಅದು ಪಣ್ಣಿತು - adu paṇṇitu |
| ನೀ ಪಣ್ಣಿನೆಯ - nī paṇṇine/paṇṇinya (statement/question) | ನಾಂಗ ಪಣ್ಣಿನೊಂ - nanga paṇṇinoṃ |
| ಅವುಂ ಪಣ್ಣಿನಾ - avu paṇṇinā | ನೀಂಗ ಪಣ್ಣಿನ್ಹ್ಯೊ - nīnga paṇṇinhyo |
| ಅವೆ ಪಣ್ಣಿನಾ - ave paṇṇinā | ಅವ್ಹಾಳ ಪಣ್ಣಿನಾ - avhāḷa paṇṇinā |

ಉಡು - -ಡು ending verbs without a stressed penultimate syllable (change to -ಟ್ಟ-)

| ನಾ ಉಟ್ಟೆ - nā uṭṭe | ಅದು ಉಟ್ಟದು - adu uṭṭadu |
| ನೀ ಉಟ್ಟೆಯ - nī uṭṭeya/uṭṭya (statement/question) | ನಾಂಗ ಉಟ್ಟುಂ - nanga uṭṭuṃ |
| ಅವುಂ ಉಟ್ಟಾಂ - avu uṭṭāṃ | ನೀಂಗ ಉಟ್ಠ್ಯೊ - nīnga uṭṭhyo |
| ಅವೆ ಉಟ್ಟಾ - ave uṭṭā | ಅವ್ಹಾಳ ಉಟ್ಟಾ - avhāḷa uṭṭā |

ಸಾಪಡು - -ಡು ending verbs with an unstressed penultimate syllable

| ನಾ ಸಾಪಟೆ - nā sāpaṭe | ಅದು ಸಾಪಟುದು - adu sāpaṭudu |
| ನೀ ಸಾಪಟೆಯ/ಸಾಪಟ್ಯ - nī sāpaṭeya/sāpaṭya (statement/question) | ನಾಂಗ ಸಾಪಟುಂ - nanga sāpaṭuṃ |
| ಅವುಂ ಸಾಪಟಾಂ - avu sāpaṭāṃ | ನೀಂಗ ಸಾಪಠ್ಯೊ - nīnga sāpaṭhyo |
| ಅವೆ ಸಾಪಟಾ - ave sāpaṭā | ಅವ್ಹಾಳ ಸಾಪಟಾ - avhāḷa sāpaṭā |

ಪಾರು - stressed long vowel as the penultimate syllable (change the final syllable to -ತು)

| ನಾ ಪಾತೆ - nā pāte | ಅದು ಪಾತದು - adu pātadu |
| ನೀ ಪಾತ್ಯ/ಪಾತೆಯ - nī pātya/pāteya (statement/question) | ನಾಂಗ ಪಾತೊಂ - nanga pātoṃ |
| ಅವು ಪಾತಾಂ - avu pātāṃ | ನೀಂಗ ಪಾಥ್ಯೊ - nīnga pāthyo |
| ಅವೆ ಪಾತಾ - ave pātā | ಅವ್ಹಾಳ ಪಾತಾ - avhāḷa pātā |

ಇಳಿ - -ಇ ending verbs

| ನಾ ಇಳಿಂಜೆ - nā iḷiṃje | ಅದು ಇಳಿಂಜುದು - adu iḷimjudu |
| ನೀ ಇಳಿಂಜೆಯ - nī iḷiṃjeya | ನಾಂಗ ಇಳಿಂಜುಂ - nanga iḷimjuṃ |
| ಅವು ಇಳಿಂಜಾಂ - avu iḷiṃjāṃ | ನೀಂಗ ಇಳಿಂಝ್ಯೊ - nīnga iḷiṃjhyo |
| ಅವೆ ಇಳಿಂಜಾ - ave iḷimjā | ಅವ್ಹಾಳ ಇಳಿಂಜಾ - avhāḷa iḷiṃjā |

ಉಳು (uḷu to fall) (also ಅಳಿ, ನಡಿ)

| ನಾ ಉಳಂದೆ - nā uḷunde | ಅದುಉಳುಂದದು- adu uḷuṃdadu |
| ನೀ ಉಳುಂದ್ಯ/ಉಳುಂದೆಯ - nī uḷuṃdya/uḷuṃdeya | ನಾಂಗಉಳುಂದುಂ- nanga uḷunduṃ |
| ಅವು ಉಳುಂಡಾಂ - avu uḷuṃdāṃ | ನೀಂಗಉಳುಂಢ್ಯೊ- nīnga uḷuṃḍhyo |
| ಅವೆ ಉಳುಂಡಾ - ave uḷuṃḍā | ಅವ್ಹಾಳಉಳುಂಡಾ - avhāḷa uḷuṃḍā |

This is a special pattern unique to ನಿಲ್ಲಿ (nilli) and -ಕ್ಯೊ (-kyo) ending verbs (ex. ತುಂಕ್ಯೊ - tuṃkyo)

| ನಾ ನಿಂಡೆ/ತುಂಕಿಂಡೆ - nā niṃḍe/tuṃkiṃḍe | ಅದು ನಿಂಡದು/ತುಂಕಿಂಡದು - adu niṃḍadu/tuṃkiṃḍadu |
| ನೀ (ನಿಂಡ್ಯ/ತುಂಕಿಂಡ್ಯ)/(ನಿಂಡೆಯ/ತುಂಕಿಂಡೆಯ) - nī (niṃḍya/tuṃkiṃḍya)/(niṃḍeya/tuṃkiṃḍeya)(statement/question) | ನಾಂಗ ನಿಂಡುಂ/ತುಂಕಿಂಡುಂ - nanga niṃḍuṃ/tuṃkiṃḍuṃ |
| ಅವು ನಿಂಡಾಂ/ತುಂಕಿಂಡಾಂ - avu niṃḍāṃ/tuṃkiṃḍāṃ | ನೀಂಗ ನಿಂಢ್ಯೊ/ತುಂಕಿಂಢ್ಯೊ - nīnga niṃḍhyo/tuṃkiṃḍhyo |
| ಅವೆ ನಿಂಡಾ/ತುಂಕಿಂಡಾ - ave niṃḍā/tuṃkiṃḍā | ಅವ್ಹಾಳ ನಿಂಡಾ/ತುಂಕಿಂಡಾ - avhāḷa niṃḍā/tuṃkiṃḍā |

The following verbs are irregular:

ಕುಡು (to give)

| ನಾ ಕುಡ್ತೆ - nā kuḍte | ಅದು ಕುಡ್ತದು - adu kuḍtadu |
| ನೀ ಕುಡ್ತ್ಯ/ಕುಡ್ತೆಯ - nī kuḍtya/kuḍteya (statement/question) | ನಾಂಗ ಕುಡ್ತೊಂ - nanga kuḍtoṃ |
| ಅವು ಕುಡ್ತಾಂ - avu kuḍtāṃ | ನೀಂಗ ಕುಡ್ಥ್ಯೊ - nīnga kuḍthyo |
| ಅವೆ ಕುಡ್ತಾ - ave kuḍtā | ಅವ್ಹಾಳ ಕುಡ್ತಾ - avhāḷa kuḍtā |

ಪುಡಿ (to carry)

| ನಾ ಪುಡಿಚೆ - nā puḍice | ಅದು ಪುಡಿಚದು - adu puḍicā |
| ನೀ ಪುಡಿಚ್ಯ/ಪುಡಿಚೆಯ - nī puḍicya/puḍiceya (statement/question) | ನಾಂಗ ಪುಡಿಚುಂ - nanga puḍicuṃ |
| ಅವು ಪುಡಿಚಾಂ - avu puḍicāṃ | ನೀಂಗ ಪುಡಿಛ್ಯೊ - nīnga puḍichyo |
| ಅವೆ ಪುಡಿಚಾ - ave puḍicā | ಅವ್ಹಾಳ ಪುಡಿಚಾ - avhāḷa puḍicā |

ಚಿರಿ/ಉರಿ (to smile/peel) (add -ಚ- before adding endings)

| ನಾ ಚಿರ್ಚೆ/ಉರ್ಚೆ - nā circe/urce | ಅದು ಚಿರ್ಚದು/ಉರ್ಚದು - adu circadu/urcadu |
| ನೀ (ಚಿರ್ಚ್ಯ/ಚಿರ್ಚೆಯ)/(ಉರ್ಚ್ಯ/ಉರ್ಚೆಯ) - nī (circya/circeya)/(urcya/urceya) (statement/question) | ನಾಂಗ ಚಿರ್ಚೊಂ/ಉರ್ಚೊಂ - nanga circoṃ/urcoṃ |
| ಅವು ಚಿರ್ಚಾಂ/ಉರ್ಚಾಂ - avu circāṃ/urcāṃ | ನೀಂಗ ಚಿರ್ಛ್ಯೊ/ಉರ್ಛ್ಯೊ - nīnga circhyo/urchyo |
| ಅವೆ ಚಿರ್ಚಾ/ಉರ್ಚಾ- ave circā/urcā | ಅವ್ಹಾಳ ಚಿರ್ಚಾ/ಉರ್ಚಾ - avhāḷa circā/urcā |

ತೋಯಿ (to wash)

| ನಾ ತೋಚೆ - nā toce | ಅದು ತೋಚದು - adu tōcadu |
| ನೀ ತೋಚ್ಯ/ತೋಚೆಯ - nī tōcya/tōceya (statement/question) | ನಾಂಗ ತೋಚುಂ - nanga tōcuṃ |
| ಅವು ತೋಚಾಂ - avu tōcāṃ | ನೀಂಗ ತೋಛ್ಯೊ - nīnga tōchyo |
| ಅವೆ ತೋಚಾ - ave tōcāṃ | ಅವ್ಹಾಳ ತೋಚಾ - avhāḷa tōcā |

ವಯ್ಯಿ (to scold)

| ನಾ ವಶ್ಶೆ - nā vaśśe | ಅದು ವಶ್ಶದು - adu vaśśadu |
| ನೀ ವಶ್ಶ್ಯ/ವಶ್ಶೆಯ - nī vaśśye/vaśśeya (statement/question) | ನಾಂಗ ವಶ್ಶುಂ - nanga vaśśuṃ |
| ಅವು ವಶ್ಶಾಂ - avu vaśśāṃ | ನೀಂಗ ವಶ್ಶ್ಹ್ಯೊ - nīnga vaśśhyo |
| ಅವೆ ವಶ್ಶಾ - ave vaśśā | ಅವ್ಹಾಳ ವಶ್ಶಾ - avhāḷa vaśśā |

ಇರು (to be)

| ನಾ ಇಂದೆ - nā inde | ಅದು ಇಂದದು - adu iṃdadu |
| ನೀ ಇರಂಡೆಯ - nī iraṃḍeya | ನಾಂಗ ಇಂದ್ನೂಂ/ಇನ್ನೂಂ - nanga iṃdnūṃ/innuṃ |
| ಅವುಂ ಇನ್ನ - avu inna | ನೀಂಗ ಇಂಢ್ಯೊ - nīnga iṃḍhyo |
| ಅವೆ ಇಂದ - ave iṃda | ಅವ್ಹಾಳ ಇಂದ - avhāḷa iṃda |

ವರು (to come)

| ನಾ ವಂದೆ - nā inde | ಅದು ವಂದು - adu vaṃdadu |
| ನೀ ವಂದ್ಯ/ವಂದೆಯ - nī vaṃdya/vaṃdeya | ನಾಂಗ ವನ್ನೂಂ - nanga vannuṃ |
| ಅವುಂ ವನ್ನ - avu vanna | ನೀಂಗ ವಂಧ್ಯೊ - nīnga vaṃdhyo |
| ಅವೆ ವಂದ - ave vaṃda | ಅವ್ಹಾಳ ವಂದ - avhāḷa vaṃda |

ಪೋಹು (to go)

| ನಾ ಪೋನೆ - nā pōne | ಅದು ಪೋಚು - adu pōcu |
| ನೀ ಪೋನ್ಯ/ಪೋನೆಯ - nī pōnya/pōneya | ನಾಂಗ ಪೋನ್ನುಂ - nanga pōnnuṃ |
| ಅವುಂ ಪೋನ್ನ - avu pōnna | ನೀಂಗ ಪೋನ್ಹ್ಯೊ - nīnga ponhyo |
| ಅವೆ ಪೋನ - ave pōna | ಅವ್ಹಾಳ ಪೋನ - avhāḷa pōna |

ಆಹು (to happen/become)

| ನಾ ಆಯ್ರಾಣಿ - nā āyraṇi | ಅದು ಆಚು - adu ācu |
| ನೀ ಆನಾ/ಆನೆಯ - nī ānā/āneya (statement/question) | ನಾಂಗ ಆನುಂ - nanga ānuṃ |
| ಅವುಂ ಆನಾ - avu ānā | ನೀಂಗ ಅನ್ಹ್ಯೊ - nīnga ānhyo |
| ಅವೆ ಆನಾ - ave ānā | ಅವ್ಹಾಳ ಆನಾ - avhāḷa ānā |

Past Perfect/Past Progressive or Remote Past

The past progressive and past perfect in Sankethi are the same, and their meaning is distinguished only by context. For this reason, the conjugations below may be referred to jointly as the remote past.

| ನಾ ಸಾಪಡಾನ್ನಿಂದೆ- nā sāpaḍānninde | ಅದುಸಾಪಡಾನ್ನಿಂದು - adu sāpaḍānnindu |
| ನೀಸಾಪಡಾನ್ನಿಂಡೆಯ- nī sāpaḍānninḍeya | ನಾಂಗಸಾಪಡಾನ್ನಿನೂಂ - nanga sāpaḍānninūṃ |
| ಅವು ಸಾಪಡಾನ್ನಿನ- avu sāpaḍānninna | ನೀಂಗಸಾಪಡಾನ್ನಿಂಢ್ಯೊ - nīnga sāpaḍānninḍhyō |
| ಅವೆಸಾಪಡಾನ್ನಿಂದ - ave sāpaḍānninda | ಅವ್ಹಾಳಸಾಪಡಾನ್ನಿಂದ - avhāḷa sāpaḍānninda |

Future

This is a hypothetical construction for the future tense in Sankethi, though it functions more like a hypothetical ("Shall I...?"). C.T. Dathathreya reconstructs this set of conjugations by referring to Tamil and Kannada conjugations for the future tense. In a literary or poetic context, it would likely imply the future tense, and when appearing as an instruction, it has the jussive meaning of "must do" or the passive meaning "will be done". Dathathreya refers to this as the "future indefinite", suggesting a distant (hence very hypothetical) circumstance.

| ನಾ ಸಾಪಡವೆ- nā sāpaḍave | ಅದು ಸಾಪಮ್- adu sāpaḍum |
| ನೀಸಾಪಡವೆಯ- nī sāpaḍaveya | ನಾಂಗಸಾಪಡವೊ(ಂ) - nanga sāpaḍavo(ṃ) |
| ಅವುಸಾಪಡವಾಂ- avu sāpāḍavāṃ | ನೀಂಗಸಾಪಡವ್ಹ್ಯೊ - nīnga sāpaḍavhyo |
| ಅವೆಸಾಪಡವ - ave sāpaḍava | ಅವ್ಹಾಳಸಾಪಡವ- avhāḷa sāpaḍava |

Negation

Negation is indicated by suffixing the appropriate ending, and similar to Kannada, there are separate forms for each tense. Again, the example verb is ಸಾಪಡು (sāpaḍu). Some Sankethi speakers negate with the ending -ಅಲ್ಲೆ (alle) and others with -ಅಲ್ಲ (alla). It varies with the generation of the speakers and their proximity to Tamil or Kannada communities. The negative future is a hypothetical construction based on C.T. Dathathreya's reconstruction.

Present: ಸಾಪಡಲ್ಲ (sāpaḍalla)

Present Progressive: ಸಾಪಡರಾಂಡಿಕ್ಕಲ್ಲ (sāpaḍarāṃḍikkalla)

Past/Present Perfect: ಸಾಪಡಿಕ್ಕಲ್ಲ (sāpaḍikkalla)

Past Progressive: ಸಾಪಡಾನ್ನಿಂದಲ್ಲ (sāpaḍānnindalla)

Future: ಸಪಡವಿಲ್ಲ (sāpaḍavilla)

Imperative

| Low (male) | ಪಣ್ಡೋ (paṇḍō) |
| Low (female) | ಪಣ್ಡೇ (paṇḍē) |
| Standard | ಪಣ್ಣು (paṇṇu) |
| Polite | ಪಣ್ಣಂಗೊ (paṇṇango) |
| Optative | ಪಣ್ಣಿಡು (paṇṇiḍu) |
| Hortative | ಪಣ್ದಮೊ (paṇdamo) |

Prohibitive

| Dismissive/Insistent/Low "don't" | ಪಣ್ಣವಾನಕಡೋ (paṇṇavānakaḍō) |
| Non-polite "don't" | ಪಣ್ಣವಾಣ (paṇṇavāṇa) |
| Polite "please don't" | ಪಣ್ಣವಾಣಂಗೊ (paṇṇavāṇango) |
| Recommending "shouldn't" | ಪಣ್ಣಕಾಹದು (paṇṇakāhadu) |
| Forbidding "mustn't" | ಪಣ್ಣಕುಡಾದು (paṇṇakuḍādu) |

== See also ==
- Sankethi people
- Languages of India
- List of Indian languages by total speakers

== Sample text ==
=== English ===
All human beings are born free and equal in dignity and rights. They are endowed with reason and conscience and should act towards one another in a spirit of brotherhood.

=== Kannada script ===
ಏಲ್ಲಾ ಮನುಶ್ಯಂಗಳೂ ಸ್ವತಂತ್ರಮಯಿಟೆ ಹುಟ್ಟಂಡಾ. ಆವ್ಹಾಳುಕ್ಕುಮೆ ಆಂತಃಕರಣೂ ಘನತೆ ಹಕ್ಕು ರೆಂಡೂ ಉಂಡೂ. ವಿವೇಕೂ ಆಂತಃಕರಣೂ ಇಕರ್ತಣ್ಣೂ ಅವ್ಹಾಲೂಮೆ ವತ್ತರೂ ಕೊತ್ತರೂ ತಮಯೂಂ ತಮ್ಬ್ಯಾನ್ಯು ಪೋಲೆ ನಡಂಧ್ಗಣೂ.

=== Latin script ===
Ellā manuśyangaḷū svatantramayiṭe huṭṭanḍā. Avhāḷukkume āntahkaraṇū ghanate hakku renḍū unḍū. Vivēkū antaḥkaraṇū ikartaṇṇū avhālūme vattarū kottarū tamayūṃ tambyānyu pōle naḍandhgaṇū.
