= Gamaka (storytelling) =

Gamaka, also known as kaavya vaachana, is a form of storytelling by singing that originated in Karnataka, India. One person reads a stanza of a poem with highest emphasis on meaning, applying suitable raga or a dhaati (melodic line), usually matching the emotion of the poem; the song generally has no established rhythm. Another person then explains the meaning of the stanza with examples and anecdotes. Gamaka draws ragas from Kannada folk music, Yakshagana and Carnatic music. The singing itself is called gamaka and the singer a gamaki. The explanation of the rendering is called vyakyana. The emphasis in kaavya vaachana is on literature (Saahithya) and not on music where singer splits, compounds words in poems to make them easier to understand.

The poems are chosen mostly from old Kannada epics such as Karnataka Bharatha Kathamanjari, Jaimini Bharatha, Harischandra Kavya, Siddarameshwara charite, Ajita purana, Devi-Bhagavata, and Torave Ramayana and recently from that of Sri Ramayana Darshanam.

== Gamaka Academy ==
Karnataka Gamaka Kala Parishat (Academy of Gamaka Art, Karnataka) based in NR Colony, Bangalore is an organisation that is formed to support and encourage the Gamaka Art form. Gamaka Kala Prishat conducts certification exams in Gamaka, with its syllabus consisting of poems picked from the above-mentioned epics. They also hold annual meeting of all the gamakis across state to discuss the state and future of gamaka.

== Gamaka Kala Vedike North America ==
Gamaka art is flourishing in the North Americas. An organization for promoting Gamaka in North America was established in the year 2020.

== Misconceptions ==
There is a misconception that gamaka and harikathe are the same, though they are related art forms. Harikatha is usually based on Telugu (and to a lesser extent other Dravidian languages) literature and the Vaisnava tradition, especially the tellings of the Bhagavata Purana. Gamaka is similar but is traditionally focused on Kannada literature (especially vachanas) and the Saiva tradition, though it spans multiple religious traditions and languages. Both art forms originated as ways to transmit the teachings of Puranas, Upanishads and high intellectual traditions in popular form and languages understandable to common people without Sanskrit education. The antecedent of harikatha in particular can be seen in the Haridasa tradition, which promoted the Dvaita Vedanta tradition of Madhvacharya through popular devotional singing.

Gamaka vachana is often confused with gamak (or gamakam), the words used in Indian classical music to refer to the styles of rendering a note (see ornaments (in music). Gamaka sometimes is mistaken for a form of music, but is instead a clear reading of complex poetry with complete emphasis on literature while its musicality is also important, but secondary. Its name is likely a reference to this, as it is a form of storytelling and exposition with the use of music (that is, gamaka).

== Exponents ==
- Krishnagiri Krishna Rayaru
- Kalale Sampathkumarachar
- Bharatha Bindu Rao
- Gamaki Raghavendra Rao
- Basavapatna Subbaiah Subbaiah Koushik
- Gangamma Keshavamurthy
- H R Keshava Murthy
- Basavappa Shastri
- Seetharama Rao Hosabale
- Narahari Sharma Kerekoppa
- Mattur Ramamurthy
- M S Ananthapadmanabha Rao
- Gamaka Kala Rathna H.Seshagiri Rao

== Styles ==
There are many styles in gamaka. While Bangalore, Mysore and Matturu styles heavily use Karnataka Sangeetha, styles of Sagara and Theerthahalli region use more folk/traditional central Karnataka style of singing with emphasis on literature. There is some influence of Yakshagana style in singing.
