= Sidnekoppa =

Village in India

- Village
- Location within Karnataka Location within India
- Coordinates: 15°27′23″N 75°53′21″E
- Country: India
- State: Karnataka
- District: Koppal district

Languages
  - Official: Kannada
- Time zone: UTC+5:30 (IST)
- Vehicle registration: KA 37

Sidnekoppa is a village in the Koppal district in Karnataka state, India.

== Demographics ==
Per the 2011 Census of India, Sidnekoppa has a total population of 1136; of whom 607 are male and 529 female.

== See also ==
- Bannikoppa
- Mannapura
- Sompura
- Malekoppa
- Tondihal
