= Harlapur, Gadag =

Harlapur Harlapura
- Village
- Location within Karnataka Location within India
- Coordinates: 15°25′19″N 75°46′27″E
- Country: India
- State: Karnataka
- District: Gadag district

Languages
  - Official: Kannada
- Time zone: UTC+5:30 (IST)
- Vehicle registration: KA-26

Harlapur is a village in the Gadag district of Karnataka State in India.

== Demographics ==
Per the 2011 Indian census, Harlapur has a total population of 4714, of whom 2406 are male and 2308 are female.

== Transport ==
Harlapur is 15 km from Gadag. There is a railway station in Harlapur.

== See also ==
- Lakkundi
- Timmapur, Gadag
- Kanaginahal
- Yarehanchinal
- Gadag
