= List of North Karnataka historical sites =

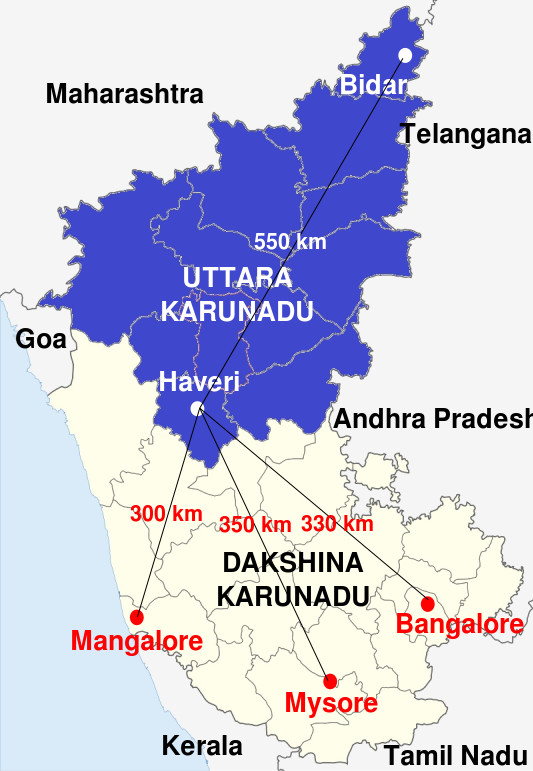
Distance from major cities of Karnataka to North Karnataka

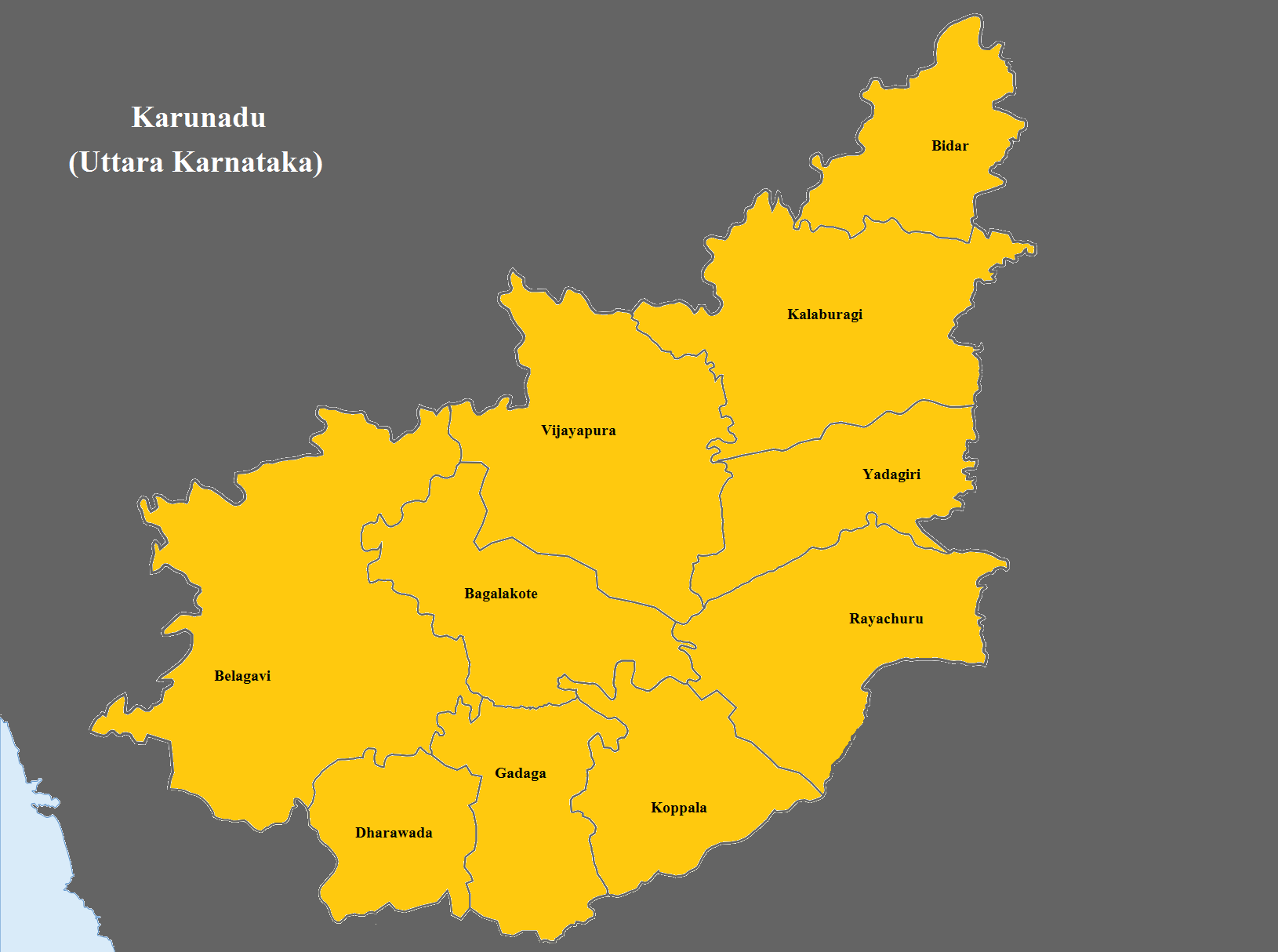
North Karnataka

This is a list of historically important places in North Karnataka.

== Badami ==
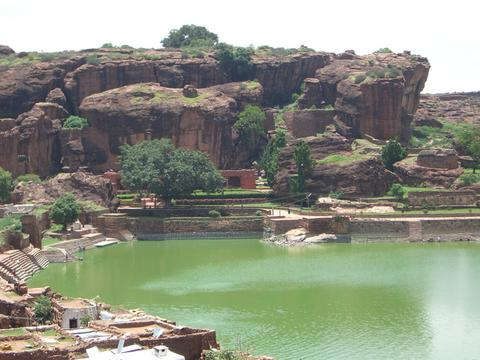
Tank at Badami

Badami has a set of four elaborately carved 'cave temples' and one natural Buddhist temple. The caves are located halfway up a low hill and can be approached by stairs. Between the second and the third caves there are stairs that go up to the top of the hill, where there are some fortifications from the Chalukya era. The third cave contains almost 3-metre high sculptures.

The caves overlook the ancient Agatsyateerth pond, built sometime in the 5th century. Just behind the archaeological museum, there is a long stairway that leads to the fortification on the top of the hill. Most people who come to Badami do not venture this way, this is the best thing about the place. There are a couple of Chalukya temples on the top covered with intricate carvings. On the northern side of the pond is a group of Shiva temples, called the Bhoothnath temples

== Aihole ==
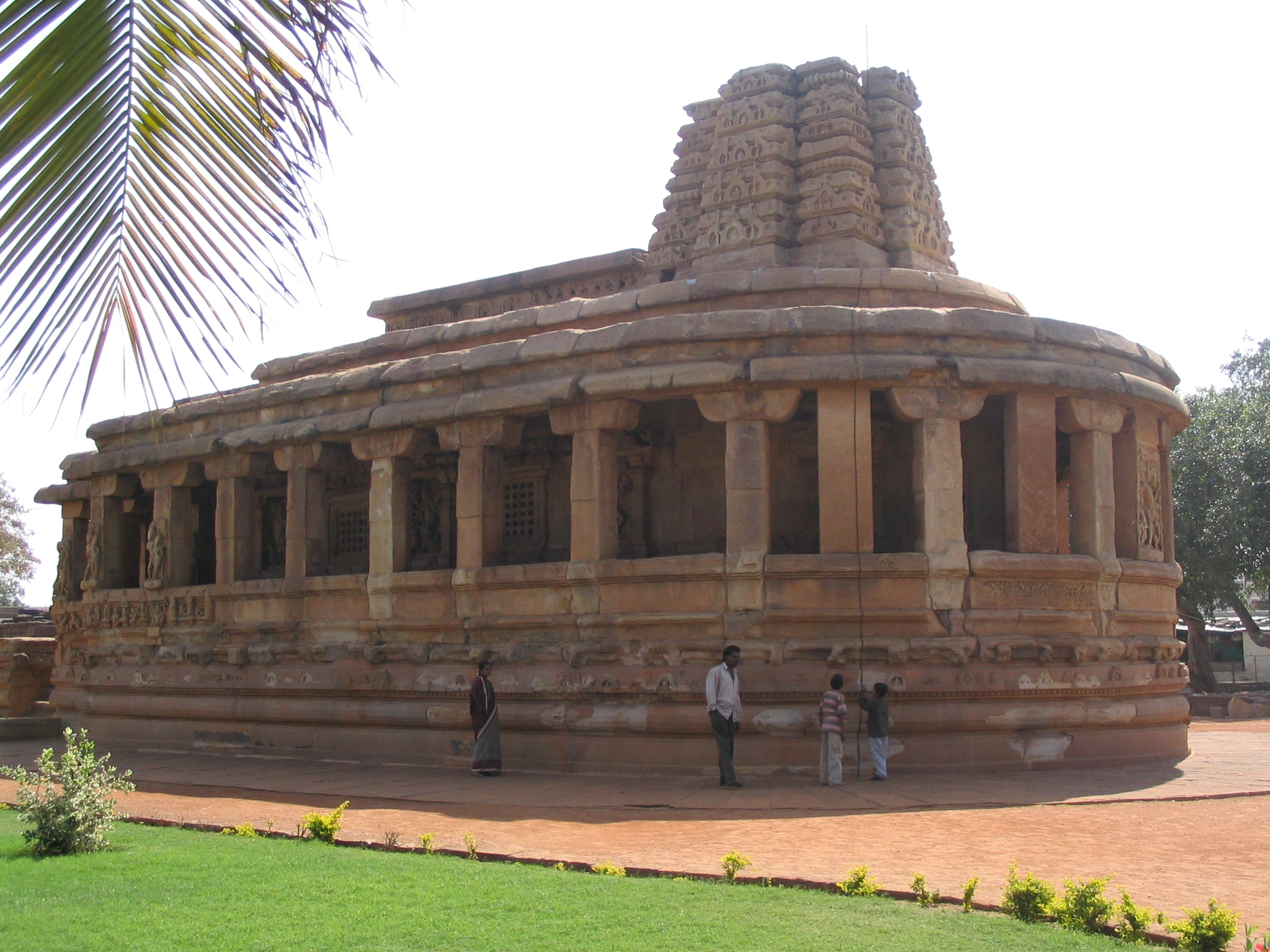
Durga temple at Aihole

There are more than a 100 temples in the village dating from the 6th to the 12th centuries. Of these around 30 temples are within an enclosed area and the others are spread all over the village.

The Aihole was the first capital of the early Chalukyas and is a veritable treasure trove of ancient temples. Actually quite similar to Hampi, only much more ancient and much less publicized.

The most famous of the temples is the photogenic Durga temple within the enclosed complex, lying in the midst of lush green lawns. The temple is apsidal in plan, topped by a curvilinear shikhara. A pillared corridor runs around the temple. The pillars are beautifully carved with sculptures depicting incidents from the Ramayana. Another notable temple is the Chalukya Shiva Temple, also within the compound. The temple has beautifully carved pillars. There are several other smaller shrines and a small museum within the same complex.

The Revalphadi Cave, dedicated to Shiva, is remarkable for its delicate details.

Not to be missed is the Konthi Temple Complex (Kwanthi Gudi), the Uma Maheswari Temple with a beautifully carved Brahma seated on a lotus, the austere Jain Meguti Temple and the two storeyed Buddhist Temple.

== Mahakuta ==
Mahakuta, once a great center of shaiva cult, Mahakuta is a beautiful place surrounded by hills. The Mahakuteshwara temple dedicated to Shiva, is built in the Dravidian style.

Naganath Temple, located in a forest on the way to Mahakuta, it is one of the early Chalukyan temples dedicated to Shiva.

== Banashankari ==
The temple is dedicated to Banashankari or Shakambari (a form of Parvati) is located at Cholachagud popularly called Banashankari. A famous fair and festival is held here in January - February.

== Belagavi ==
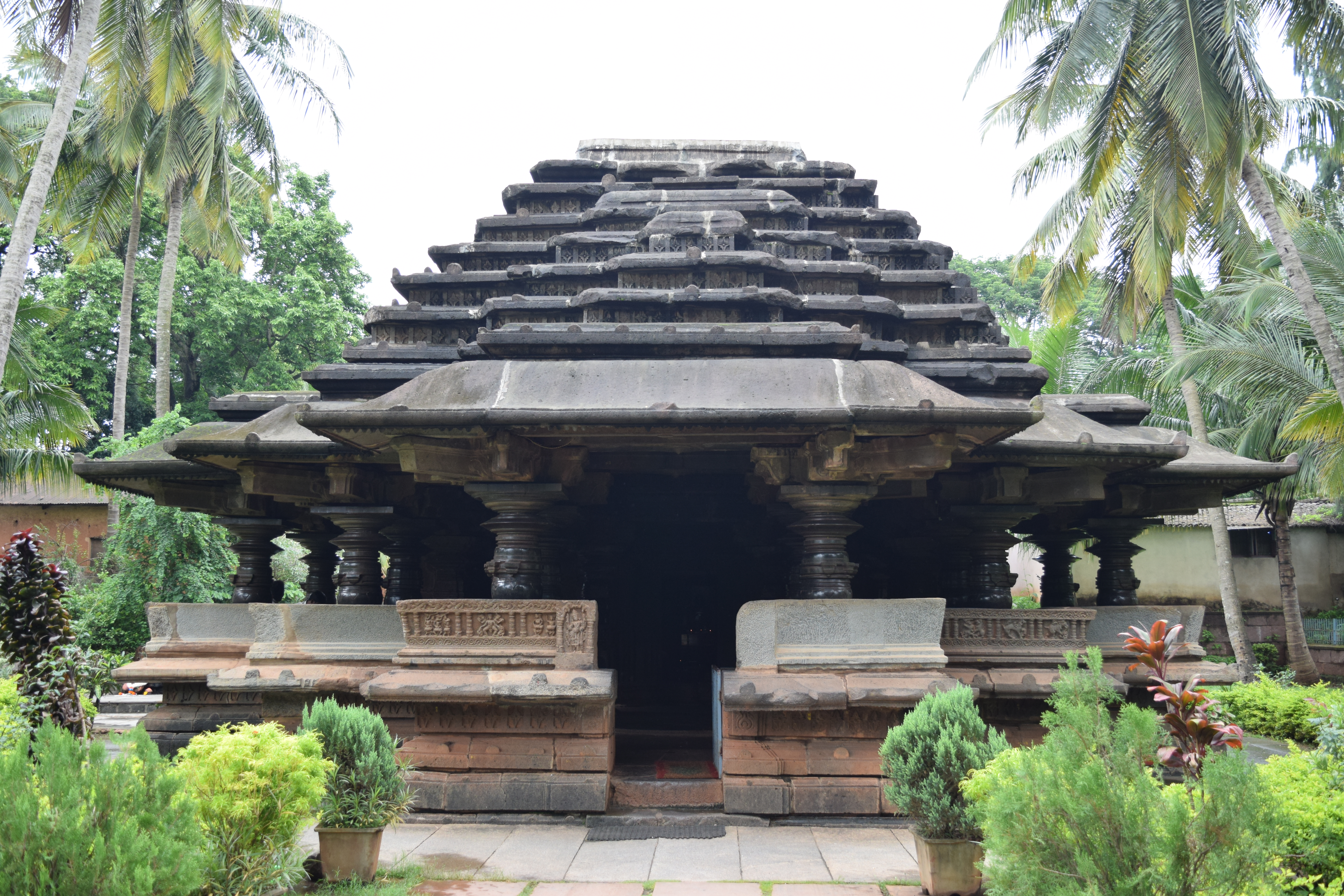
Kamal Basadi Belagavi

Belagavi earlier known as Venugrama (Bamboo Village) is one of the oldest, strong, prominent and well cultured historical place nestling high in the Western Ghats. The old town area with cotton and silk weavers stands gloriously besides the modern, bustling, tree-lined British Cantonment.

Belgaum is the District Headquarters of Belgaum District and Divisional Headquarters Of Belgaum division, on the Bengaluru-Pune National Highway. It was the capital of the Rattas who shifted to this place from Saundatti during the close of 12th century A.D. The place has a fort inside which built by one Ratta Officer called Bichirajain 1204 A.D. exhibits the execution of a totally refined style of temple architecture. It has excellently and artistically carved Kamala Basadi having huge protruding lotus petals of stone (Kamala) in its ceiling and this beautiful structure in Chalukya style houses Neminatha Teerthankara image. The place came under the Sevunas (Yadavas) and Vijayanagara and later conquered by Mahamood Gawan in 1474 on behalf of the Bahamanis. The fort was strengthened by the Adilshahis and there is an excellent structure, Safa Mosque with three entrances, has rich floral and impressive calligraphic designs. Two of its pillars have Kannada Inscriptions in Nagari Scripts, one of 1199 of Ratta King Kartaveerya IV and another of 1261 is of Seuna (Yadava) Krishna.

Due to its proximity to the states of Maharashtra and Goa, Belgaum has acquired the cultural flavour of these states and blended it with the local Kannada culture to create a rich heritage, which is unique in its manifestation. It is also known as Malenadu or Rain Country and the vegetation here is verdant green throughout the year.

This city is famous for Belgaum Kunda.

== Ballari ==
Ballari is a district headquarters. It has spread round two rocky hills, and one of them called Balahari Betta has a temple. The Ballari Fort built round the hill in Vijayanagara times is still intact. It passed into the hands of Bijapur, Marathas, and Haider. After the fall of Tipu, the town was ceded to the British. The Durgamma (Ballaramma) temple here has the deity represented by the heap of earth. The place has two large mosques. A Government Medical College was founded here in 1961 Bellary now has grown as a great centre of apparel manufacturing.

== Bidar ==
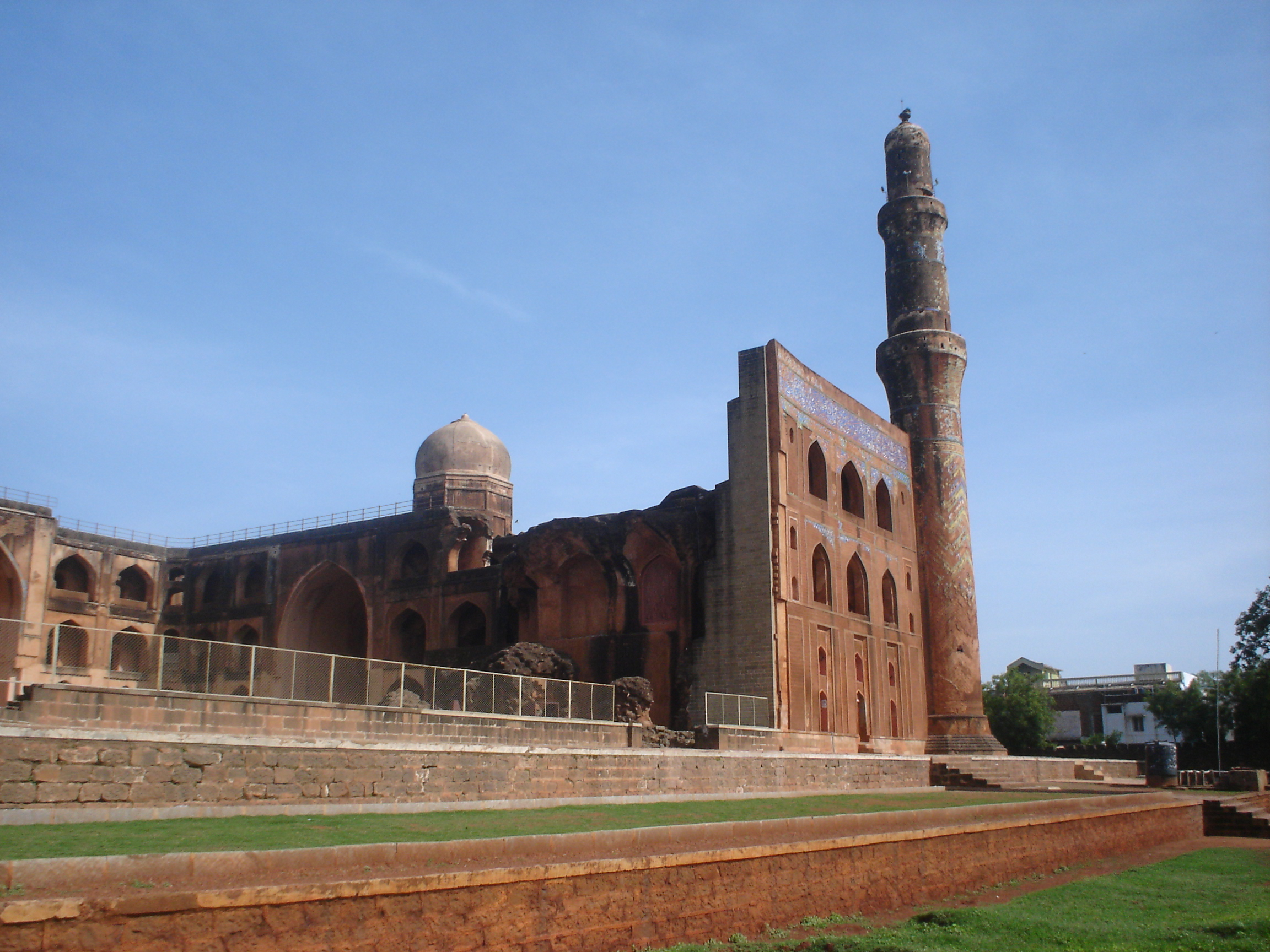
Arabic University Mahmud Gawan, Bidar

Bidar, the District headquarters, described as Viduranagara, a place of Mahabharatha times. It must have existed as a minor but powerful fort during the days of Kalyani Chalukyas (AD 1074 – AD 1190). In A.D.1322, Prince Ulugh Khan captured the town of Bidar. Subsequently, it was annexed by Sultan Muhammad-bin- Tughlaq of Delhi. With the establishment of the Bahmani dynasty (AD 1347), Bidar was occupied by Sultan Alla-Ud-Din Bahman Shah Bahmani. During the rule of Ahmad Shah I (1422–1486 AD), Bidar was made the capital city of Bahmani Kingdom.

The Bahmani Shahi rulers made it their capital, in c, 1426 and fortified it. It is still intact. Inside it are the Solha Kamb mosque (1423) and palaces like Takht Mahal, Chini Mahal and Rangeen Mahal; some of them are highly decorated with mosaic and wood work etc. The fort has magnificent doorways and massive bastions. Gawan's Madrasa in the town is a gorgeous imposing building of Indo-Saracenic style. After the decline of Bahamanis, the Barid-Shahis ruled over Bidar and it was taken over by the Bijapur rulers in 1619. Astur near Bidar has tombs of Bahmani Sultans which are tall structures, and one of them has paintings. The Gurudwara at Bidar is built at Nanak Zhira, which is described as a fountain created by Guru Nanak during his visit.

Bidar boasts of several religious centers: The famous Nanak Jheera – the largest Sikh temple at least in Karnataka, carries the tale that Guru Nanak – the first guru of the Sikhs visited this place and got rid of the scarcity of drinking water in the region. A popular spot is the Sikh temple, Guru Nanak Jheera, where fresh crystal clear spring water appears from nowhere. Papanaash is a temple of Lord Shiva. The historical fort of Bidar was a stronghold of the Bahamani Kings in the 14th and 15th centuries. The fort is surrounded by three miles of walls with 37 bastions, most of them surmounted with cannons. The fort now lies in ruins.

Bidar is famous for Bidriware

== Kalaburagi ==
Kalaburagi, erstwhile known as Gulbarga, and the area around it was a part of the ancient dynasty Badami Chalukyas In the early part of the 14th century, it became the part of the Delhi Sultanate. It was captured by Ulugh Khan, one of the generals belonging to the Tughlaq dynasty of Delhi Sultanate, and later captured by Mohammed bin Tughlaq, the Sultan of Delhi. It remained a part of the Delhi Sultanate until the death of Mohammed bin Tughlaq. Later it became a part of the Bahamani kingdom. The Bahamani kings made it their capital from 1347 to 1428.

== Raichur ==
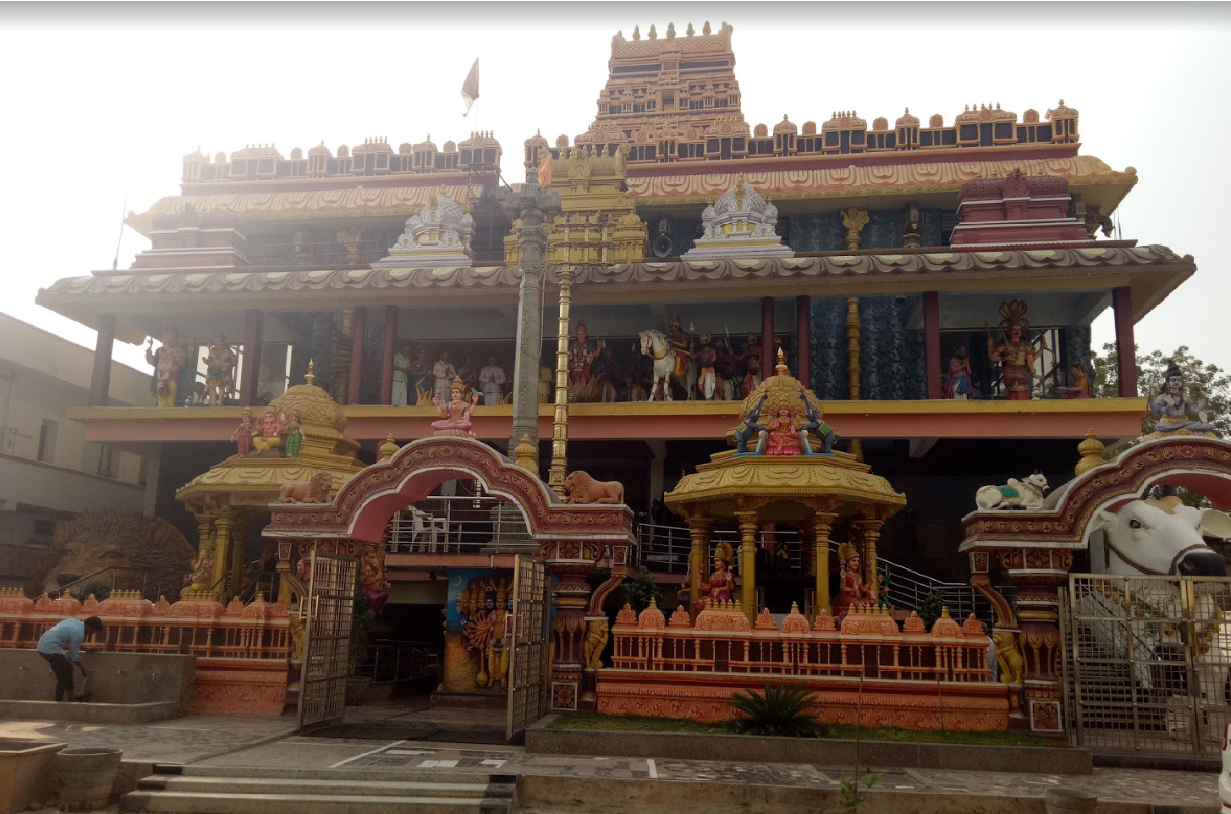
Temple is situated in core heart of the city Raichur.The temple is Re-Built with modern architecture which has many idols of Rishis and yogis inside and around the temple. The temple basement has a showcase of jyothirlinga temples from various states. The main deity of the temple is Lord Kanyaka Parameshwari. Along with her are Lord Venkateshwara, Shiva and Vittala Panduranga idols.

Raichur has a rich history, having been a part of various empires, such as the Bahmanis and Vijayanagara and Hyderabad. The city is famous for its imposing Raichur Fort.[1] Here, stone inscriptions have been found in Persian and Arabic which belonged to the bastion of the fort, referring to its construction in 1294.[2] Among the ruins of the immense fort are many irrigation tanks and old temples. The fort was built by Kakatiya king Rudra in 1284 CE which passed on to the Vijayanagar kingdom after the decline of the Kakatiyas. Thereafter the fort was under dispute for nearly two centuries. It was captured by the Bahmanis in 1323 CE. Saluva Narasimha Raya expressed a wish in his testament that the city of Raichur be recaptured. This had been in the mind of Krishnadevaraya since his coronation in 1509.

== Vijayapura ==
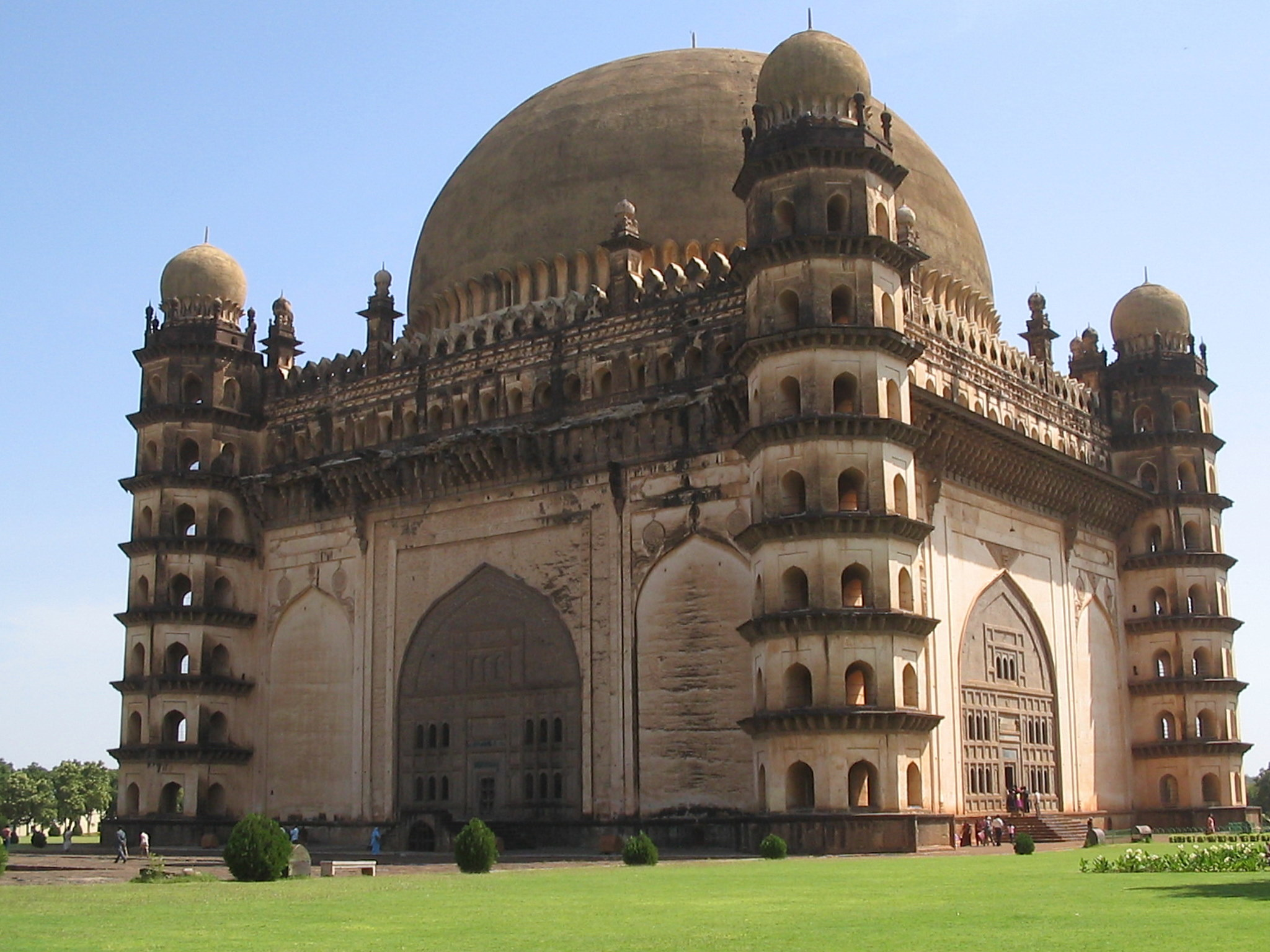
Gol Gumbaz in Bijapur, North Karnataka

Bijapur, which has changed its name officially to Vijayapura, the district headquarters, is one of the most important centres of Indo-Saracenic art, being the capital of the Adil Shahis of Bijapur (1489–1686). The place is mentioned as Vijayapura in as inscription of 12th century A.D. The Gol Gumbaz here has the biggest dome in India. It is the 'second largest dome' in the world after St Peters Basilica in Rome. 126 feet (38 m) in diameter at its base and is the Mausoleum of Mohammed Adilshah (1626–56). It has an astonishing whispering gallery and it covers an area of 15,000 square feet (1,400 m^{2}). Ibrahim Rauza is a marvelous mausoleum of Ibrahim II (1580–1626) which stands on a platform supported by rows of arches, and at one end is the mosque and at the other the tomb. Henry Cousens called this, the Tajmahal of the South. Anand Mahal, Gagan Mahal, Asar Mahal etc. are the other important monuments of this place. Jama Masjid mosque has one of the largest remains Adil Shahi's Dynasty.

== Dharwad ==
Dharwad, a district headquarters on the Pune-Bangalore Road, is the cultural headquarters of North Karnataka. Mentioned as Dharawada in a record of the 12th century of the Kalyani Chalukyas, the place came under the Seunas, Vijayanagara, Bijapur, Mughals, Marathas, and Haider and Tipu. The Vijayanagara rulers built a fort here which was strengthened by Bijapur rulers. Its door-frame alone remains now.

Now a part of Hubballi-Dharwad Corporation, Dharwad became the district headquarters when it came under the British from the Marathas in 1818, and grew to be a centre of learning due to the English School opened in 1848, high school opened by the Basel Mission in 1868 and the Training College was initiated in 1867 which became the centre of Kannada Movement. The Karnataka Vidyavardhaka Sangha (1890) sowed the seeds of Kannada Renaissance.

The Durgadevi temple near the fort is renovated now and the Someshwara on Kalghatgi Road has a Chalukyan temple and a tank. The Mailara Linga temple at Vidyagiri is a Kalyani Chalukyas monument converted into a mosque by Bijapur army but again changed as a temple by the Peshwas. The place has many temples like Venkataramana, Nandikola Basavanna, Dattatreya, Ulavi Basavanna etc. The Murugha Matha is a centre of religious activity. All Saints' Church is one of the historical places in Dharwad; it was built in 1888 by the British, and Rt. Rev. W. V. Carl was the first presbyter,

Dharwad is famous for Dharwad Peda.

== Basavana Bagewadi ==
Basavana Bagewadi in Bijapur District. is 43 km to the east of Bijapur and is a Taluk headquarters where Sharana Basaveshwara was born (12th Century). It was an agrahara. Basaveshwara was the son of the head of this institution. The main temple here the Basaveshwara, is of Chalukyan style, but called as Sangamanatha in records. The Samadhis of Siddharameshwara and Gurupadeshwara of the Inchageri school of spiritual pursuit are seen here. A spot here identified as Basava's ancestral house is declared as protected zone by the Trust.

== Gadag-Betgeri ==
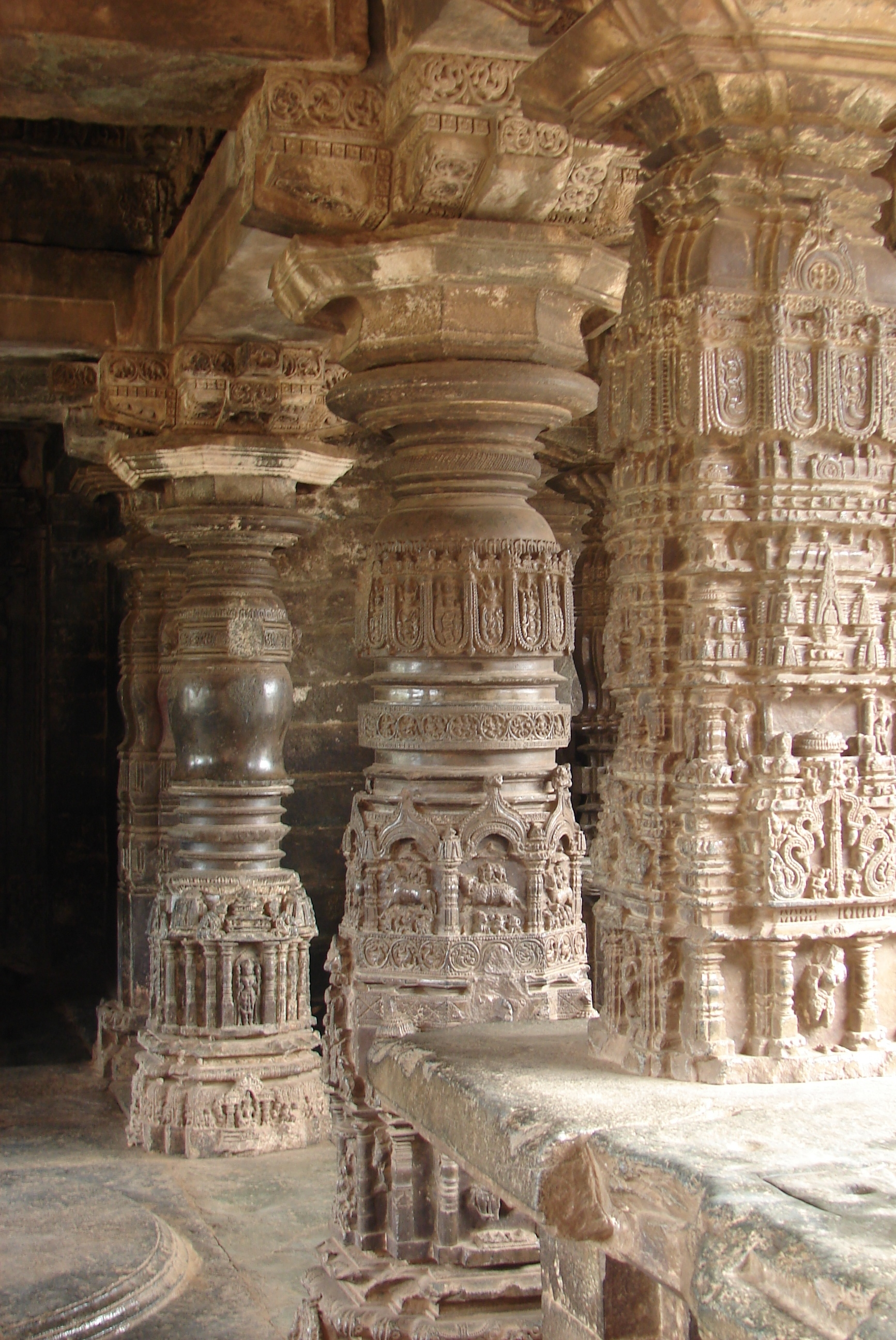
Sarasvati Temple in Gadag

Gadag-Betgeri (Kaldugu is the old name for Gadag and Battakere ("Round Tank") for Betgeri) is a twin city, It is a centre of Kalyani Chalukyas art with the large Trikuteshwara temple, originally Rashtrakuta, later expanded by the Kalyani Chalukyas into a vast complex, and it has Trikuteshwara temple complex triple shrines once housing Shiva, Brahma and Surya. The Saraswati temple in its precinct has the finest shining decorative pillars, is the finest examples of Chalukya Art.

The place has the Someshwara and Rameshwara temples of the Chalukyan style, it is also known for its religious harmony. The Veeranarayana temple of Chalukya times, completely renovated in Vijayanagara times including the image of Narayana. The great Kannada poet Kumaravyasa composed his famous "Karnataka Bharatha Kathamanjari" when staying in this temple.

The Sri Lakshmi Venkateshwara temple is situated at Venkatapura Taluk near Sortur, Gadag District. Temple was renovated by Brahmananda Swami, a devotee of Gondavalekar Maharaj a sage from Gondavale, in Satara District of Maharashtra in the beginning of the 20th century. Arati is at 12 noon and prasad follows thereafter.

People believe it as Tirupati of Uttara Karnataka. The beautiful shrines and mountains around the temple makes it must watch temple of Uttara Karnataka.

Location: The temple is located 20 km from Gadag near the village of Beldhadi. The buses are available from Gadag bus stand or Shirahatti BusStand or Hubli bus stand.

There is a direct bus service in the morning around 7 am from Hubli via Gadag. A hired taxi takes one hour from Gadag. Within the village there is a temple dedicated to Lord Lakshmi Venkateshwara.[3].

Gadag has a mosque from the time of Adil Shahi. There is also a Church of the Basel Mission (Now C.S.I.). Betageri has many artistic herostones, some dating back to the 9th-10th centuries. Gadag-Betageri is famous for the weaving industry and, of late, Gadag has excelled in printing.

== Mahadeva Temple Itagi ==
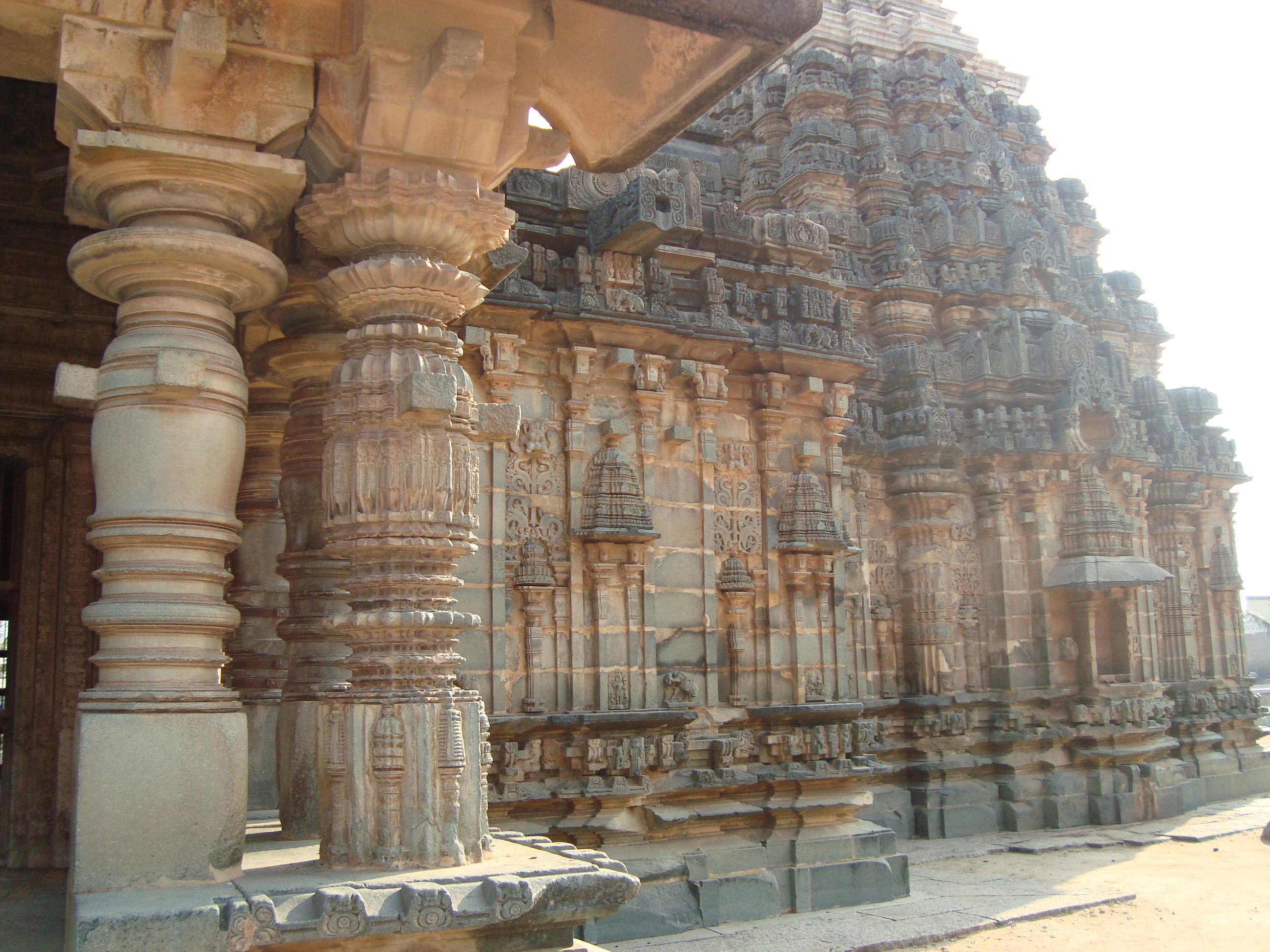
Mahadeva Temple (Itagi) in Koppal district, Karnataka

The Mahadeva temple at Itagi (Ittagi) is about 7 km from Kuknur in Yalburga Taluka in the Koppal District. The temple is one of the temples built by the Chalukyas and is known as the "Emperor among temples".

== Shiggaon Utsav Rock Garden ==
Utsav Rock Garden, Shiggaon: Sculptural Garden located near NH-4 Pune-Bangalore road, Gotagodi Village, Shiggaon Taluk, Haveri District, Karnataka. Utsav Rock Garden is an sculptural garden representing contemporary art and rural culture. A typical village is created where men and women are involved in their daily household activities. A unique picnic spot which delights common people, educated and intellectuals. There are more than 1000 sculptures in the garden of different sizes. It is an anthropological museum. It represents traditional farming, crafts, folklore, cattle herding and sheep rearing.

== Lakkundi ==
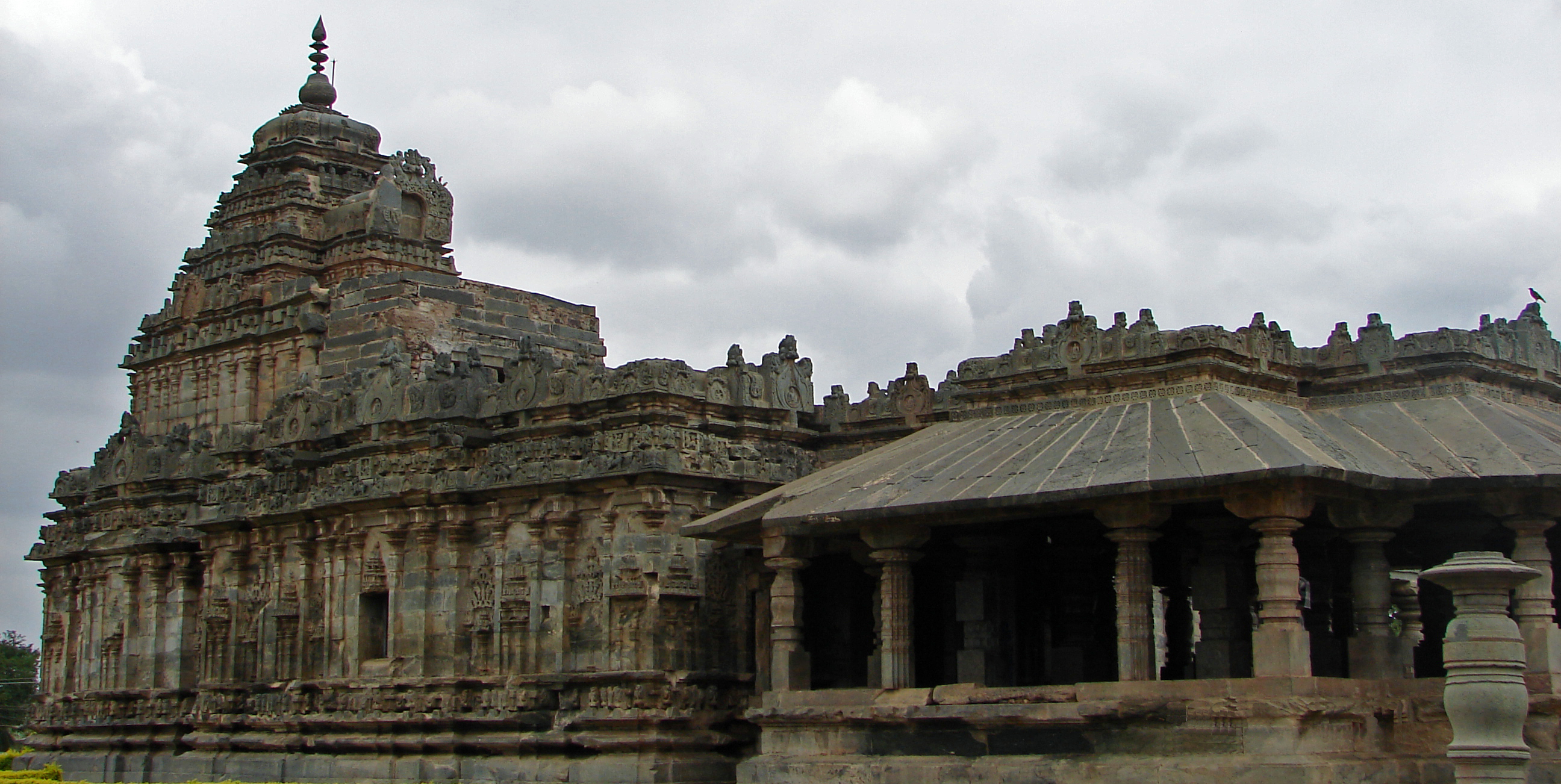
Jain temple at Lakkundi, near Gadag, (Western Chalukya monuments), North Karnataka, India

- Kasivisvesvara temple, Lakkundi.
- Brahma Jinalaya (Basadi)

Lakkundi was a place of prominence during the ninth and 14th centuries and it came under the rule of kings Chalukya, Yadava and Hoysala. It was the capital of Hoysala king Ballala II (Veeraballala) in 1192 A.D.

Lakkundi (Known as Lokkigundi) is situated at 12 km from Gadag, was once famous for its rich cultural heritage. Lakkundi finds mention in the inscriptions dating back to the 11th and 12th centuries. In these inscriptions Lokkigundi has been compared to Amaravati, the capital of Lord Indra in terms of wealth.

== Haveri ==
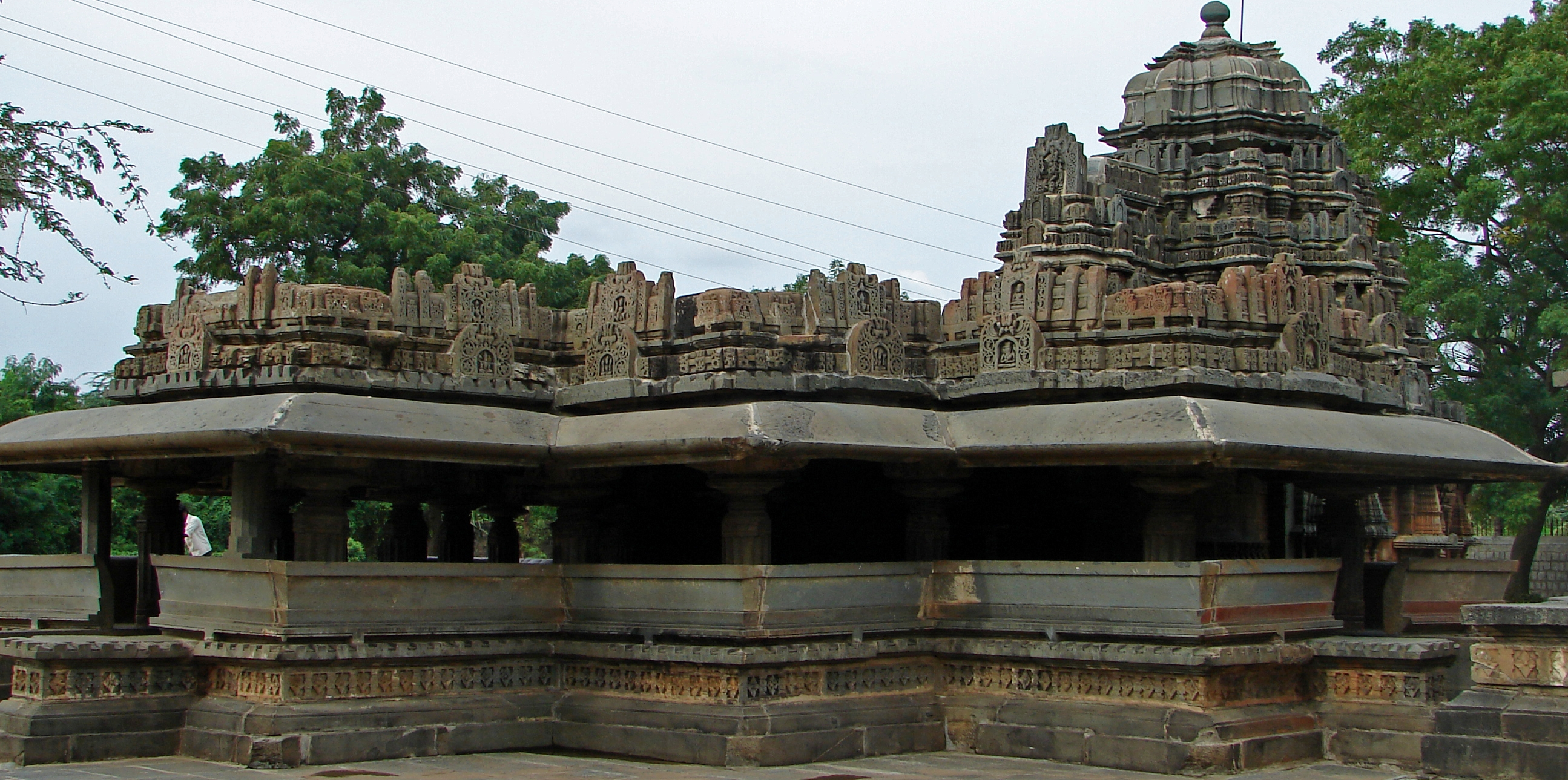
Siddhesvara Temple at Haveri

The Siddhesvara Temple at Haveri in the Haveri District

Siddhesvara Temple at Haveri, a staggered square plan with dravida articulation and superstructure, 11th century CE

== Annigeri ==
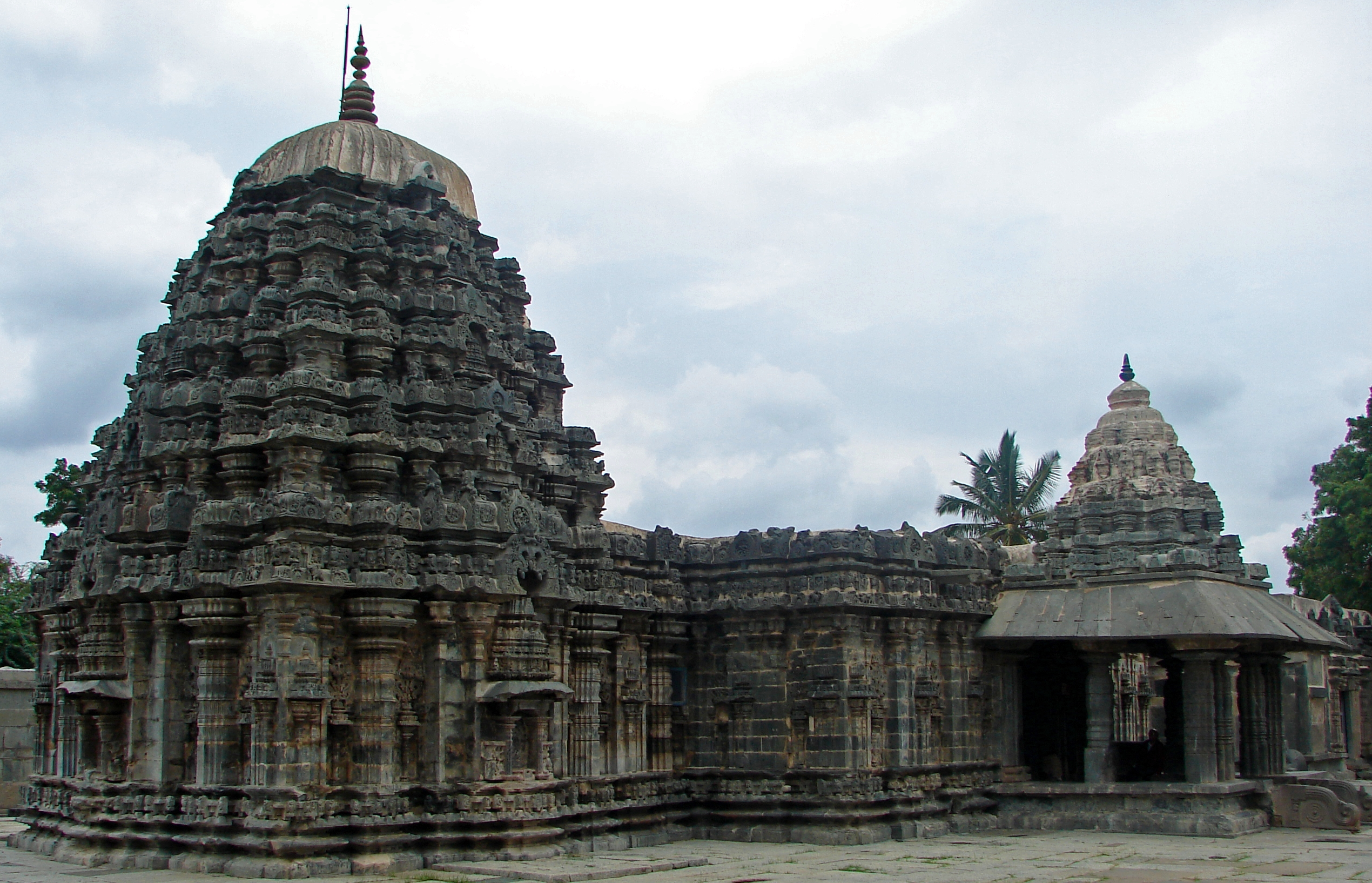
Amrtesvara Temple in Annigeri

The Amrtesvara Temple at Annigeri in the Dharwad District

Amrtesvara Temple in Annigeri was built in the Dharwad district in 1050 CE with dravida articulation. This was the first temple made of soapstone

== Dambal ==
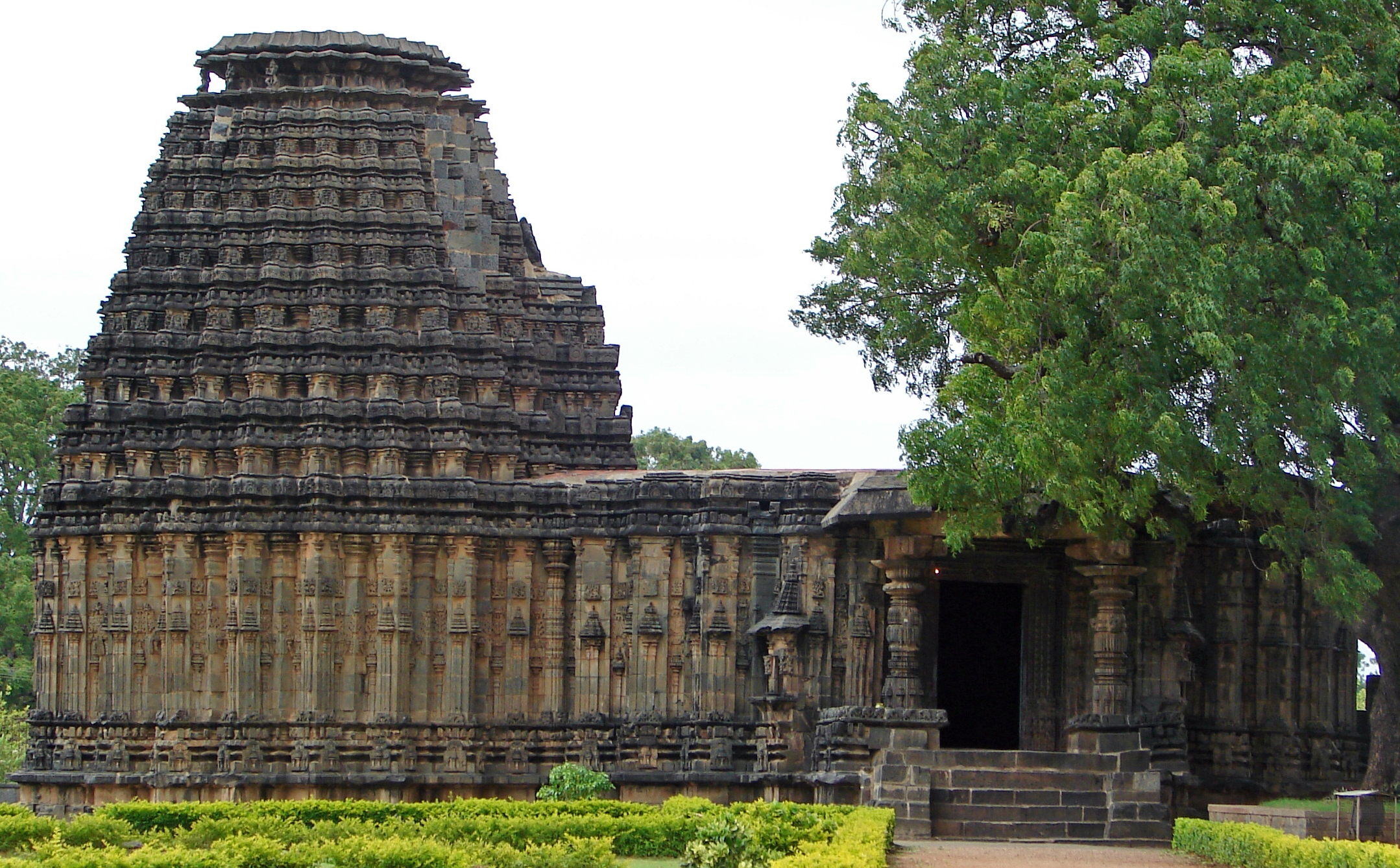
Dodda Basappa Temple at Dambal

The Doddabasappa Temple at Dambal in the Gadag District

Dambal or Dhammavolal now in Gadag dt. is 21 km from Gadag. It is also known as Dharmapolalu in ancient inscriptions. It was a Buddhist Centre too. The Doddabasappa and the Someshwara are the two notable Chalukya temples here and the Doddabasappa has polygonal star-shaped garbhagriha. With fine sculptural representations and a huge Nandi image. The Someshwara could have been an old basadi. In the old ruined fort, there is a huge Ganapati image in a small shrine. The town has a 400-year-old vast tank. There is the Thontada Siddhalingeswara Matha at the place.

Dodda Basappa Temple at Dambal, a unique 24-pointed, uninterrupted stellate (star-shaped), 7-tiered dravida plan, 12th century CE.

== See also ==
- North Karnataka
- Temples of North Karnataka
- Tourism in Karnataka
- Chalukyas
- Kadambas
- Rashtrakutas
