= Malekoppa =

Malekoppa may refer to:

== Places ==
- Malekoppa, Shimoga - a village in Shimoga district, Karnataka, India
- Malekoppa, Koppal - a village in Koppal district, Karnataka, India
