= Timmapur, Gadag district =

Timmapur Timmapura
- Village
- Location within Karnataka Location within India
- Coordinates: 15°25′56″N 75°49′59″E
- Country: India
- State: Karnataka
- District: Gadag district

Languages
  - Official: Kannada
- Time zone: UTC+5:30 (IST)
- Vehicle registration: KA-26

Timmapur is a village in the Gadag district of Karnataka State, India.

== Demographics ==
Per the 2011 Census of India, Timmapur has a total population of 3077; of whom 1564 are male and 1513 female.

== Transport ==
Timmapur is 20 km from Gadag. The nearest railway station is in Harlapur, Gadag.

== See also ==
- Lakkundi
- Kanavi
- Kanaginahal
- Yarehanchinal
- Gadag
