= Temples of North Karnataka =

List of Hindu temples in India

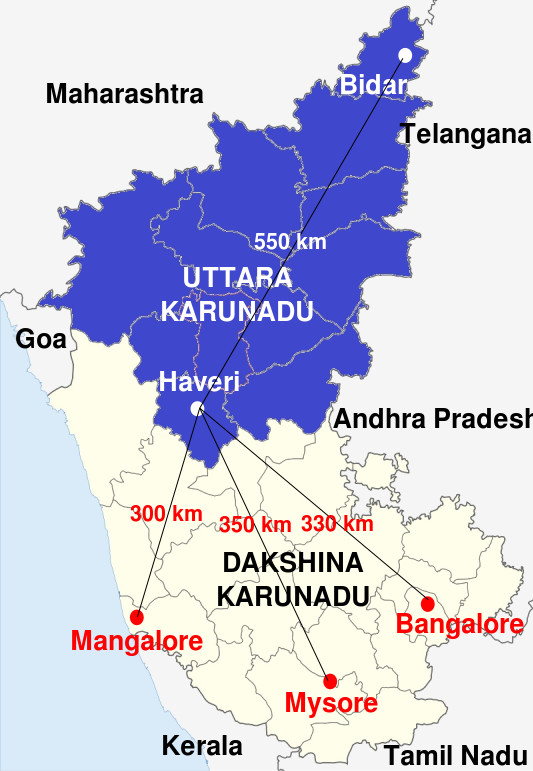
Distance from major cities of Karnataka to North Karnataka

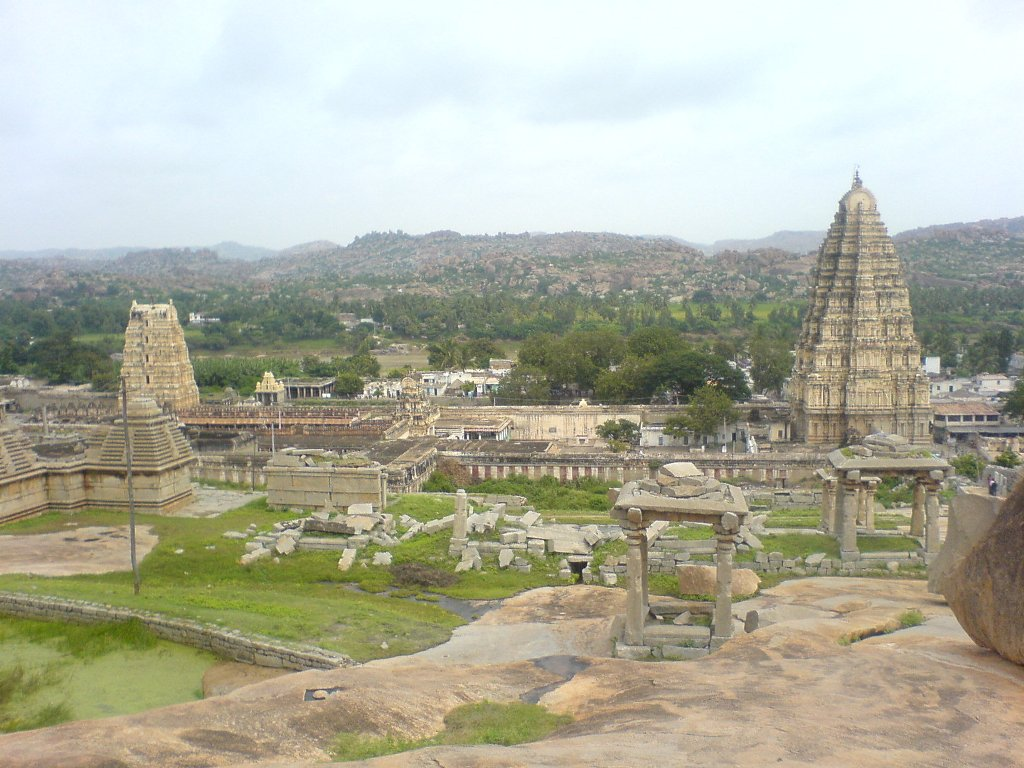
Virupaksha temple, Hampi in Vijayanagara District, North Karnataka

Temples of North Karnataka

== Gadag region ==
- Kasivisvesvara temple, Lakkundi
- Trikuteshwara temple at Gadag

== Koppal region ==
- Mahadeva Temple (Itagi) near Koppal

== Hubli-Dharwad region ==
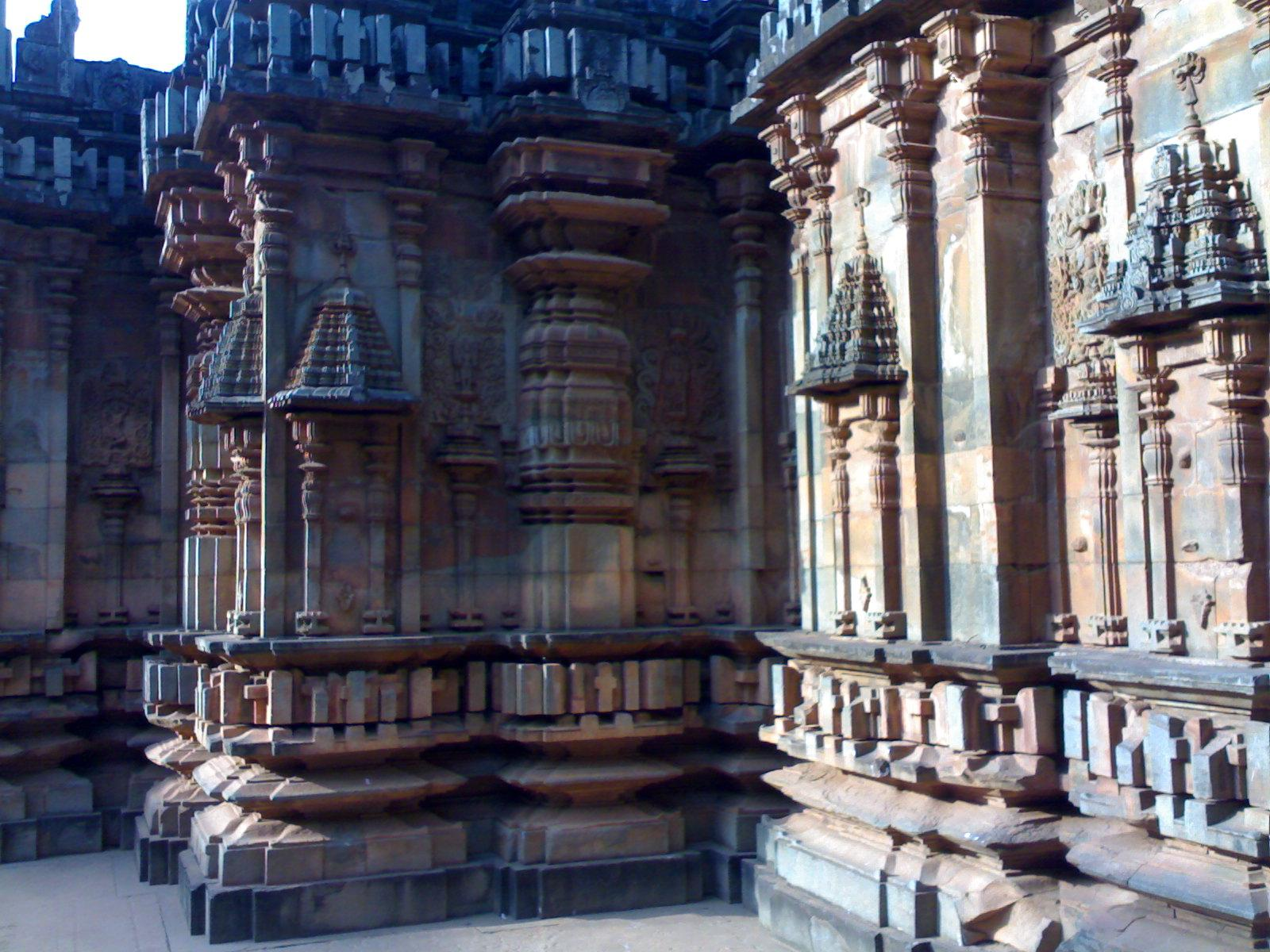
Chandramouleshwara Temple at Unkal Hubli-Dharwad

- Chandramouleshwara Temple at Unkal, Hubballi
- Banashankari Temple at Amargol Town, Hubballi

== See also ==
- Western Chalukya temples
- List of North Karnataka historical sites
