= Tondihal =

Village in India

Tondihal Tondihala
- Village
- Location within Karnataka Location within India
- Coordinates: 15°32′19″N 75°52′58″E
- Country: India
- State: Karnataka
- District: Koppal district

Languages
  - Official: Kannada
- Time zone: UTC+5:30 (IST)
- Vehicle registration: KA 37

Tondihal is a village in the Koppal district in Karnataka state, India.

== See also ==
- Sidnekoppa
- Lakkundi
- Halligudi
- Kuknoor
- Koppal
