= Huilgol Narayana Rao =

Indian playwright and freedom fighter

- Born: 4 October 1884; Gadag-Betageri, British India
- Died: 4 July 1971 (aged 86); Hubli, Karnataka, India
- Occupations: Playwright, Poet, Lawyer

Huilgol Narayana Rao (4 October 1884 - 4 July 1971) was a popular Indian playwright in the modern Kannada literature and a freedom fighter. Narayana Rao is best known as the poet who composed the then state anthem of the Karnataka State Udayavagali Namma Cheluva Kannada Nadu which heralded the birth of Karnataka . The popular song was sung by Huilgol Narayan Rao and Gangubai Hanagal at Karnataka Unification Conference held in 1924, which was also the venue which hosted the 1924 Indian National Congress Session in Belgaum.
