= Sompur =

Village in India

Sompur Sompur
- Village
- Location within Karnataka Location within India
- Coordinates: 15°26′32″N 75°53′33″E
- Country: India
- State: Karnataka
- District: Koppal district

Languages
  - Official: Kannada
- Time zone: UTC+5:30 (IST)
- Vehicle registration: KA 37

Sompur is a village in the Koppal district of Karnataka state, India.

== Demographics ==
Per the 2011 Census of India, Sompur has a total population of 1677; of whom 860 are male and 817 female.

== Transportation ==
Sompur Road railway station, located on Guntakal–Vasco da Gama line serves the area.

== See also ==
- Lakkundi
- Halligudi
- Kuknoor
- Koppal
