= Kappatagudda Wildlife Sanctuary =

Wildlife sanctuary in Karnataka, India

- IUCN category IV (habitat/species management area)
- Location within Karnataka Location within India
- Interactive map of Kappatagudda Wildlife Sanctuary
- Location: Gadag district, Karnataka, India
- Nearest city: Gadag
- Coordinates: 15.4050°N 75.5710°E
- Area: 244.15 km^{2} (94.27 sq mi)
- Established: 16 May 2019
- Governing body: Department of Forest, Ecology & Environment, Government of Karnataka

Kappatagudda Wildlife Sanctuary is a wildlife sanctuary located in Gadag district in the Indian state of Karnataka. It was formed in 2019 and it spans 244.15 km^{2} (94.27 sq mi) over dry deciduous hills across Gadag, Mundargi, and Shirahatti taluks.

== Biodiversity ==
=== Flora ===
The sanctuary features dry deciduous vegetation dominated by teak, Butea monosperma, acacia scrub, and native grasses like Cymbopogon spp. Riparian patches exist alongside seasonal streams.

A SACON–WII study confirmed the presence of 18 mammal species, including wolves, striped hyenas, jungle and rusty-spotted cats, small and large antelopes (blackbuck, chinkara, four‑horned antelope), and wild boar.

Over 180 bird species have been documented. Notable species include Indian peafowl, plum-headed parakeet, crested serpent eagle, and larks and pipits typical of arid habitats.

In February 2025, the rare White‑Naped Tit (Parus nuchalis) was observed, highlighting the sanctuary's scrub‑thorn habitat importance.

== Conservation and threats ==
In October 2024, the Karnataka Wildlife Board deferred 28 mining licence applications within 10 km of the sanctuary, following objections and environmentalist concerns over buffer-zone violations.

Local activists rallied in November 2024 against buffer-zone reduction proposals, citing violations of the Wildlife Protection Act and lack of public consultation.

In early 2025, forest officials launched phase‑2 of a survey using camera‑traps and grid-based monitoring, successfully confirming presence of wolves, leopards, porcupines, and various carnivores—also helping deter illegal activity.

== Tourism ==
In December 2023, forest authorities released an annual wildlife-themed calendar featuring local species—an initiative to boost awareness and tourism.

Plans for jungle lodges and safari facilities by mid-2024 aim to replicate models from Bandipur and Dandeli, though infrastructure development is being paced to minimize ecological impact.
