= Harlapur railway station =

Railway station in Karnataka

Harlapur

General information
- Location: Harlapur, Gadag district, Karnatak; India
- Coordinates: 15°26′05″N 75°47′57″E
- Elevation: 641 metres (2,103 ft)
- System: Indian Railways station
- Owner: Indian Railways
- Operator: South Western Railway zone
- Line: Guntakal–Vasco da Gama line
- Platforms: 2
- Tracks: Double Electric-Line

Construction
- Structure type: Standard (on ground)

Other information
- Status: Functioning
- Station code: RLP
- Zone(s): South Western Railway zone
- Division(s): Hubballi

Services
| Preceding station | Indian Railways | Following station |
|---|---|---|
| Sompur Road towards ? | South Western Railway zone Guntakal–Vasco da Gama section | Kanginhal towards ? |
Location
- Interactive map

Harlapur railway station is a railway station located on the Guntakal–Vasco da Gama line operated by the South Western Railway zone under Hubballi railway division. It is situated at Harlapur in Gadag district in the Indian state of Karnatak.
