= Bannikoppa =

- Village
- Location within Karnataka Location within India
- Coordinates: 15.386329°N 75.941191°E
- Country: India
- State: Karnataka
- District: Koppal district

Languages
  - Official: Kannada
- Time zone: UTC+5:30 (IST)
- Vehicle registration: KA 37

Bannikoppa is a village in the Koppal district of Karnataka state, India.

== Demographics ==
Per the 2011 Census of India, Bannikoppa has a total population of 2707; of whom 1363 are male and 1344 female.

== Transportation ==
Banni Koppa railway station is a railway station located on the Guntakal–Vasco da Gama line, served the area.

== See also ==
- Lakkundi
- Halligudi
- Kuknoor
- Koppal
