= Mannapur =

Village in India

Mannapur Mannapur
- Village
- Location within Karnataka Location within India
- Coordinates: 15.430846°N 75.950460°E
- Country: India
- State: Karnataka
- District: Koppal district

Languages
  - Official: Kannada
- Time zone: UTC+5:30 (IST)
- Vehicle registration: KA 37

Mannapur is a village in the Koppal district in Karnataka state, India.

== Demographics ==
Per the 2011 Census of India, Mannapur has a total population of 1108; of whom 542 are male and 566 female.

== See also ==
- Lakkundi
- Halligudi
- Kuknoor
- Koppal
