= Bhanapur railway station =

Railway station in Karnataka

Bhanapur

General information
- Location: Bhanapur, Koppal district, Karnatak; India
- Coordinates: 15°23′13″N 76°02′11″E
- Elevation: 563 metres (1,847 ft)
- System: Indian Railways station
- Owner: Indian Railways
- Operator: South Western Railway zone
- Line: Guntakal–Vasco da Gama line
- Platforms: 2
- Tracks: Double Electric-Line

Construction
- Structure type: Standard (on ground)

Other information
- Status: Functioning
- Station code: BNP
- Zone(s): South Western Railway zone
- Division(s): Hubballi

Services
| Preceding station | Indian Railways | Following station |
|---|---|---|
| Koppal towards ? | South Western Railway zone Guntakal–Vasco da Gama section | Banni Koppa towards ? |
Location
- Interactive map

Bhanapur railway station is a railway station located on the Guntakal–Vasco da Gama line operated by the South Western Railway zone under Hubballi railway division. It is situated at Bhanapur in Koppal district in the Indian state of Karnatak.
