= Banni Koppa railway station =

Railway station in Karnataka

Banni Koppa

General information
- Location: National Highway 63, Bannikoppa, Koppal district, Karnatak; India
- Coordinates: 15°24′24″N 75°56′31″E
- Elevation: 601 metres (1,972 ft)
- System: Indian Railways station
- Owner: Indian Railways
- Operator: South Western Railway zone
- Line: Guntakal–Vasco da Gama line
- Platforms: 3
- Tracks: Double Electric-Line

Construction
- Structure type: Standard (on ground)

Other information
- Status: Functioning
- Station code: BNA
- Zone(s): South Western Railway zone
- Division(s): Hubballi

Services
Preceding station	Indian Railways	Following station
Bhanapur towards ?	South Western Railway zone Guntakal–Vasco da Gama section	Sompur Road towards ?
Location
- Interactive map

Banni Koppa railway station is a railway station located on the Guntakal–Vasco da Gama line operated by the South Western Railway zone under Hubballi railway division. It is situated beside National Highway 63 at Bannikoppa in Koppal district in the Indian state of Karnatak.
