= Sompur Road railway station =

Railway station in Karnataka

Sompur Road

General information
- Location: Sompur, Koppal district, Karnatak; India
- Coordinates: 15°25′17″N 75°52′19″E
- Elevation: 620 metres (2,030 ft)
- System: Indian Railways station
- Owner: Indian Railways
- Operator: South Western Railway zone
- Line: Guntakal–Vasco da Gama line
- Platforms: 3
- Tracks: Double Electric-Line

Construction
- Structure type: Standard (on ground)

Other information
- Status: Functioning
- Station code: SOQ
- Zone(s): South Western Railway zone
- Division(s): Hubballi

Services
Preceding station	Indian Railways	Following station
Banni Koppa towards ?	South Western Railway zone Guntakal–Vasco da Gama section	Harlapur towards ?
Location
- Interactive map

Sompur Road railway station is a railway station located on the Guntakal–Vasco da Gama line operated by the South Western Railway zone under Hubballi railway division. It is situated at Sompur in Koppal district in the Indian state of Karnatak.
