= Kanginhal railway station =

Railway station in Karnataka

Kanginhal

General information
- Location: Kanaginahal, Gadag district, Karnatak; India
- Coordinates: 15°26′52″N 75°43′09″E
- Elevation: 650 metres (2,130 ft)
- System: Indian Railways station
- Owner: Indian Railways
- Operator: South Western Railway zone
- Line: Guntakal–Vasco da Gama line
- Platforms: 2
- Tracks: Double Electric-Line

Construction
- Structure type: Standard (on ground)

Other information
- Status: Functioning
- Station code: KGX
- Zone(s): South Western Railway zone
- Division(s): Hubballi

Services
Preceding station	Indian Railways	Following station
Harlapur towards ?	South Western Railway zone Guntakal–Vasco da Gama section	Gadag Junction towards ?
Location
- Interactive map

Kanginhal railway station is a railway station located on the Guntakal–Vasco da Gama line operated by the South Western Railway zone under Hubballi railway division. It is situated at Kanaginahal in Gadag district in the Indian state of Karnatak.
