= Yarehanchinal =

Village in India

Yarehanchinal Yarehanchinala
- Village
- Location within Karnataka Location within India
- Coordinates: 15°28′29″N 75°50′51″E
- Country: India
- State: Karnataka
- District: Koppal district
- Taluk: Yelburga
- Lok Sabha Constituency: Koppal

Population (2001)
  - Total: 3,206

Languages
  - Official: Kannada
- Time zone: UTC+5:30 (IST)
- PIN: 583232
- Telephone code: 08534
- Vehicle registration: KA-37

Yarehanchinal is a village in the Yelburga taluk of Koppal district in Karnataka state, India. Yarehanchinal is 20 km from Kuknoor and 25 km from Gadag. Yarehanchinal can be reached by Gadag-Kuknoor route via Harlapur-Binnal.

== Demographics ==
As of 2001 India census, Yarehanchinal had a population of 3,206 with 1,542 males and 1,484 females and 558 Households.

== See also ==
- Lakkundi
- Itagi
- Kuknoor
- Dambal
- Koppal
- Kanaginahal
