= Malekoppa, Koppal =

Village in India

Malekoppa
- Village
- Location within Karnataka Location within India
- Coordinates: 15°26′15″N 75°55′18″E
- Country: India
- State: Karnataka
- District: Koppal district

Languages
  - Official: Kannada
- Time zone: UTC+5:30 (IST)
- PIN: 583232
- Telephone code: 08534
- Vehicle registration: KA 37

Malekoppa is a village in the Koppal district of Karnataka state, India.

== See also ==
- Lakkundi
- Halligudi
- Kuknoor
- Koppal
