= Kanaginahal =

Kanaginahal Kanaginahala
- Village
- Location within Karnataka Location within India
- Coordinates: 15.456832°N 75.727833°E
- Country: India
- State: Karnataka
- District: Gadag district

Languages
  - Official: Kannada
- Time zone: UTC+5:30 (IST)
- PIN: 582102
- Vehicle registration: KA-26

Kanaginahal is a village in the Gadag district of Karnataka State in India. The first co-operative society of India was registered in 1905 at Kanaginahal village.

== Sri Narayana Temple ==
Gadag is famous for the Sri Narayana Temple built during the Chalukyan Empire. And also there is Sharanabasweshwar temple, which is also known as 2nd Kalaburgi.

== Co-operative movement ==
The first co-operative movement in Asia began here in Kanaginahal. Under the leadership of Sri Siddanagouda SannaRamanagouda Patil (1843–1933) The Agricultural Credit Cooperative Society of Kanaginahal was launched in Kanaginahal on 8 July 1905 with the initial sum of two thousand rupees. Initial work taken up by the Credit Cooperative Society was building Railway Station in the village and providing safe drinking water facility to the villagers.

== Transportation ==
Kanginhal railway station is situated in the area on Guntakal–Vasco da Gama line.

== See also ==
- Lakkundi
- Timmapur, Gadag
- Harlapur, Gadag
- Harti (Gadag district)
- Gadag
