= Malekoppa, Shimoga =

Malekoppa
- village
- Country: India
- State: Karnataka
- District: Shimoga

Languages
  - Official: Kannada
- Time zone: UTC+5:30 (IST)

Malekoppa is a village in Shimoga district, Karnataka, India.

== Demographics ==
Per the 2011 Census of India, Malekoppa has a total population of 329; of whom 156 are male and 173 female.
