= Trikuteshwara Temple, Gadag =

Hindu temple in Karnataka, India

Coordinates: 15°25′28.4″N 75°37′36″E

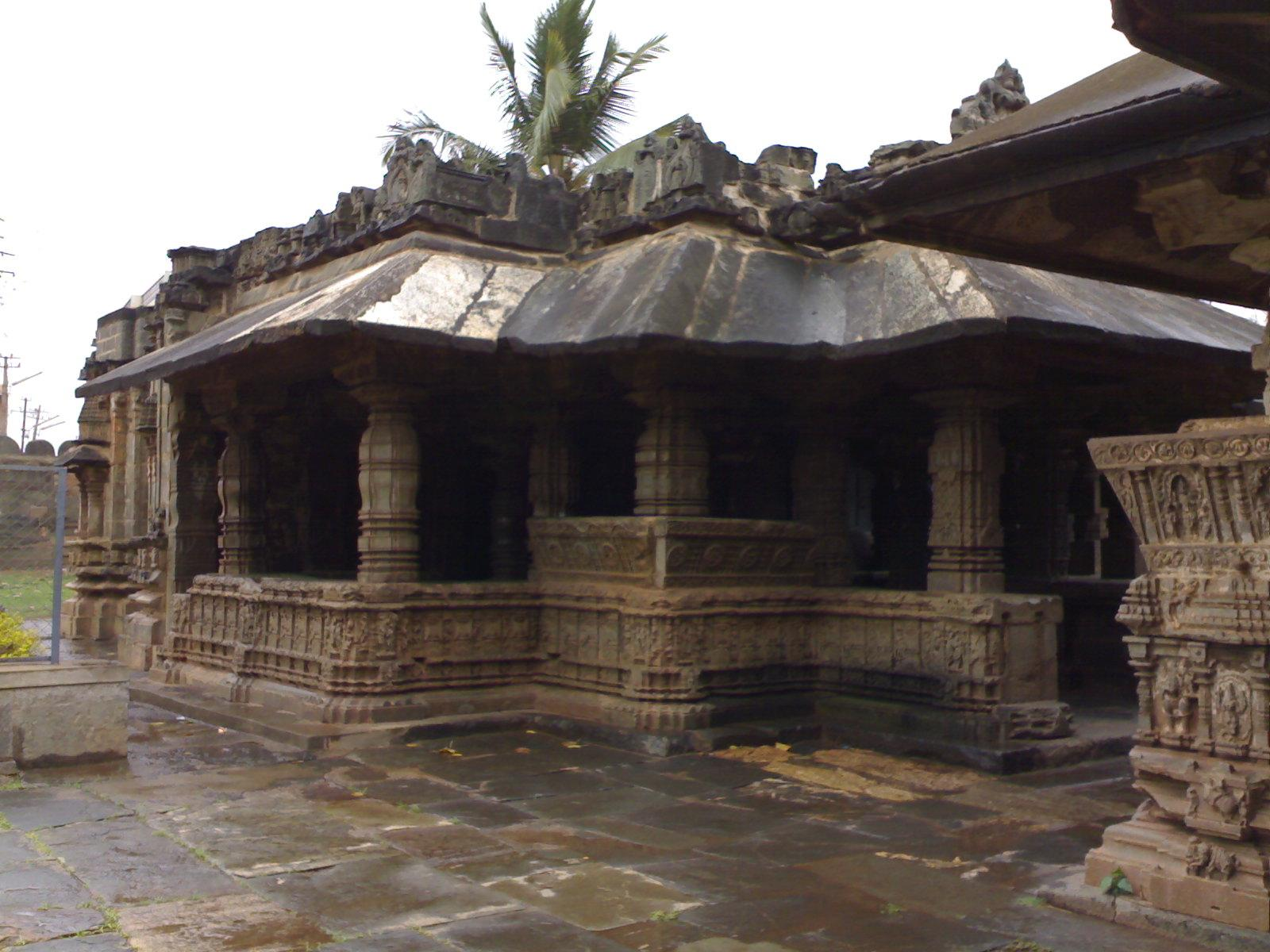
Saraswati temple at Trikuteshwara temple complex Gadag, Karnataka

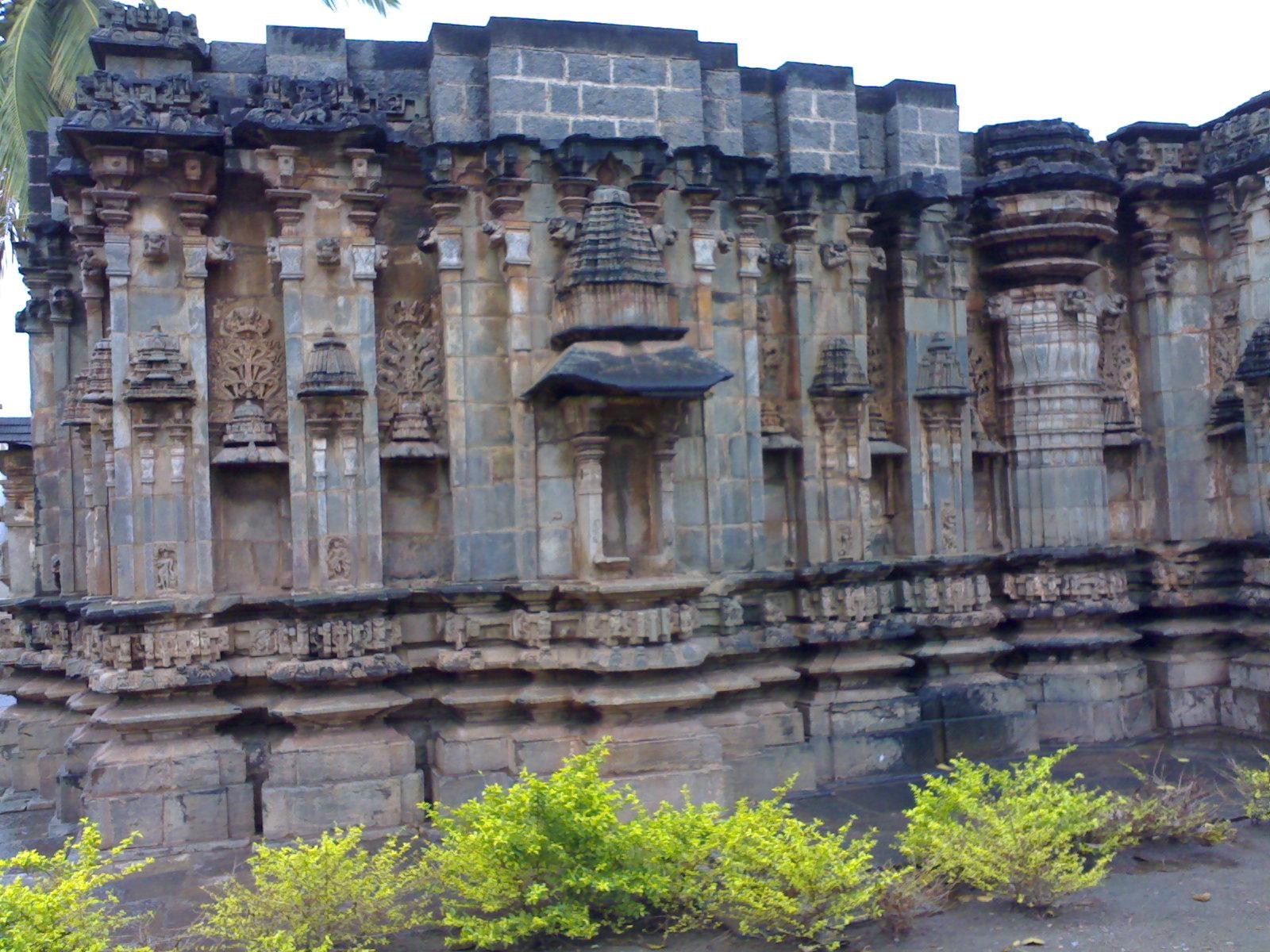
Saraswati temple at Trikuteshwara temple complex Gadag, Karnataka

Trikuteshwara temple is a Hindu temple dedicated to Shiva. The carved temple is in the town of Gadag, 50 km southeast of Hubli-Dharwad, in Karnataka, India. It is dedicated to Shiva and has three lingas mounted on the same stone. There is a shrine dedicated to Saraswathi in this temple and it has carved columns.

== Architecture ==
This temple architecture was planned by the architect Amara Shilpi Jakanachari. The Badami Chalukyas were exponents of early architectural achievements in Deccan. Aihole, Badami and Pattadakal were their centers of art. They were succeeded by the Rashtrakutas and the Kalyani Chalukyas.

The temple has ornate pillars with intricate sculpture. The sanctum enshrines three Shivalingas. The temple has chiseled stone screens and carved figurines. There is a shrine to Saraswati within the Trikuteshwara temple complex, with exquisite stone columns.

Inclined slabs that serve as balcony seats are decorated with figurative panels and are overhung by steeply angled eaves. Inside the hall, the columns have figures arranged in shallow niches. The east sanctorum has three lingas representing Brahma, Maheshwara and Vishnu; the one to the south is dedicated to the goddess Saraswati.

Just by the side is another temple dedicated to three devis — Saraswathi, Gayathri and Sharada. Only the statues are in a new style; the temple is in old architecture.

== History ==
The temple dates back to the Kalyani Chalukyas who ruled this region from around 1050 to 1200 CE, during which time about 50 temples were built.

Saraswathi temple has been vandalised in the early age and hence pooja is not offered here. But the architecture still exists.

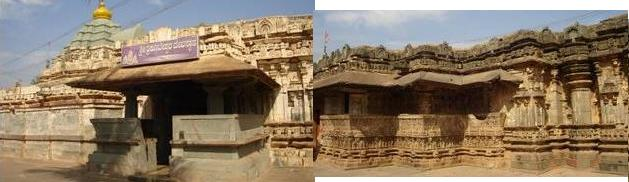
Trikuteshwara temple complex

A number of late Chalukya monuments (11th-12th centuries) in the city indicate its historic past. Other temples in Gadag are those dedicated to Someshwara and Veera Narayana. In the middle of the city stands the Someshvara Temple. Though abandoned and now in a dilapidated state, its intricate carvings are preserved. The doorways to the hall have densely carved figures and foliation.

== Trikuteshwara temple photo gallery ==
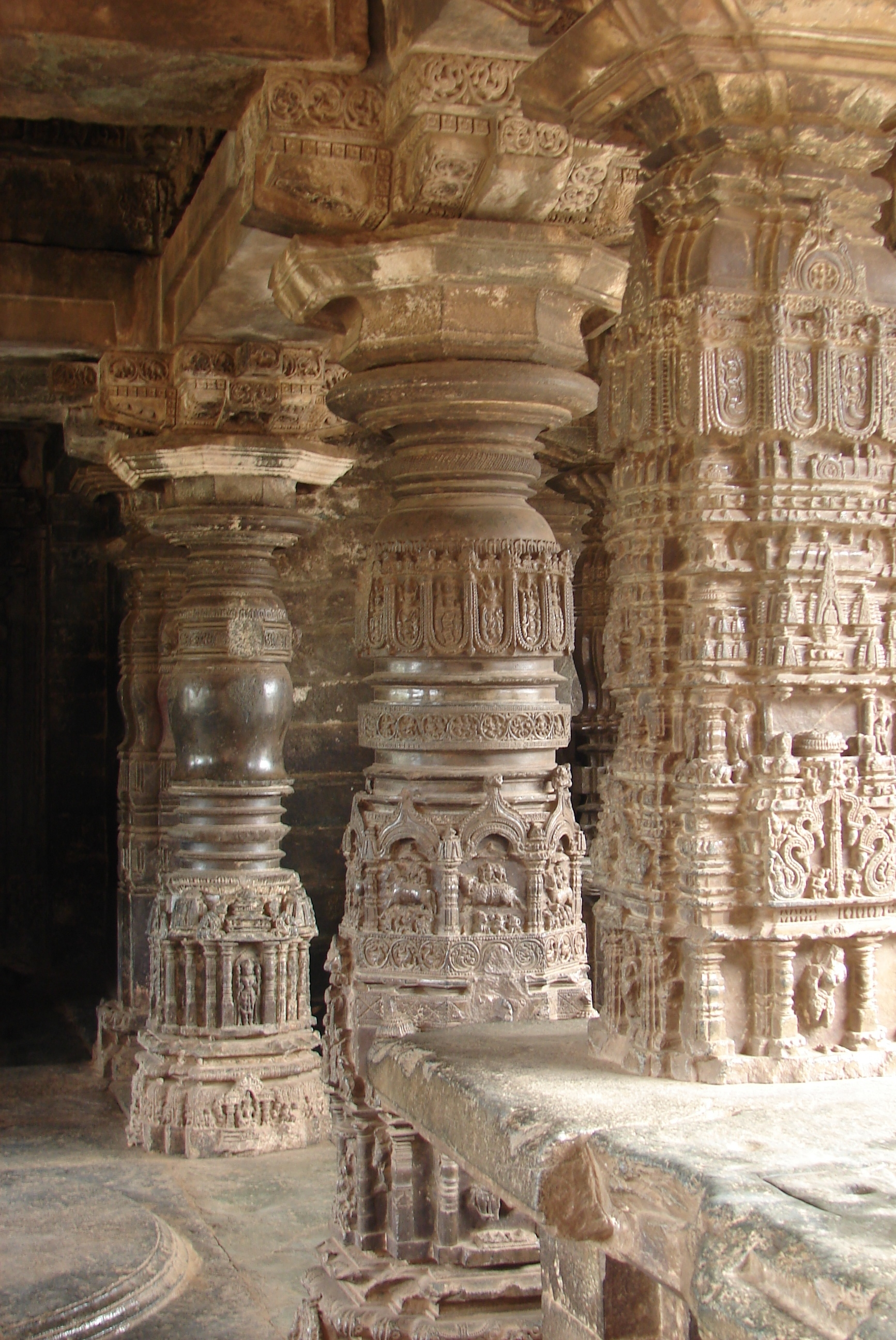
Gadag architectural style: Ornate pillars at Sarasvati Temple, Trikuteshwara temple complex

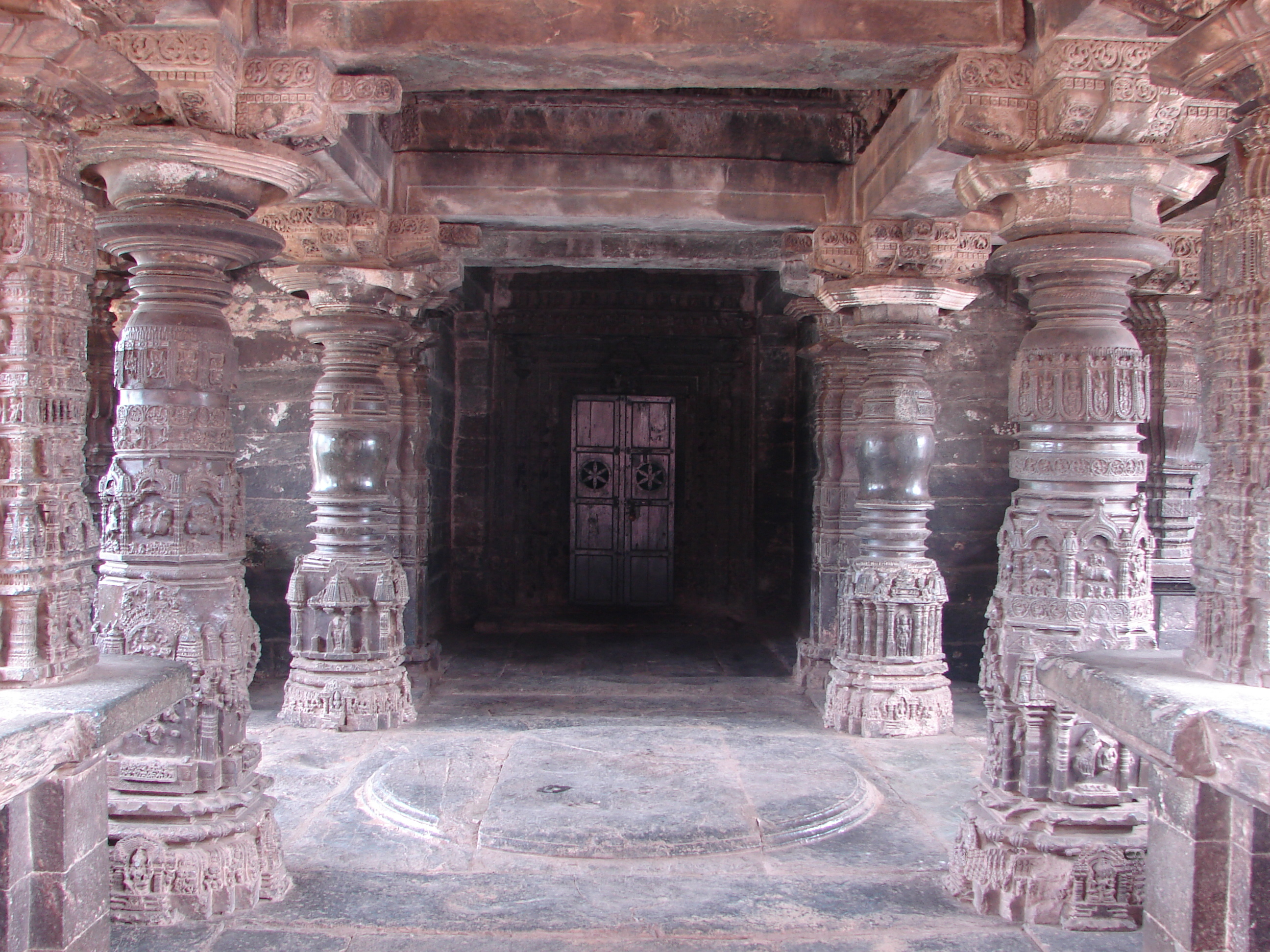
Ornate pillars at Saraswati temple in Gadag city

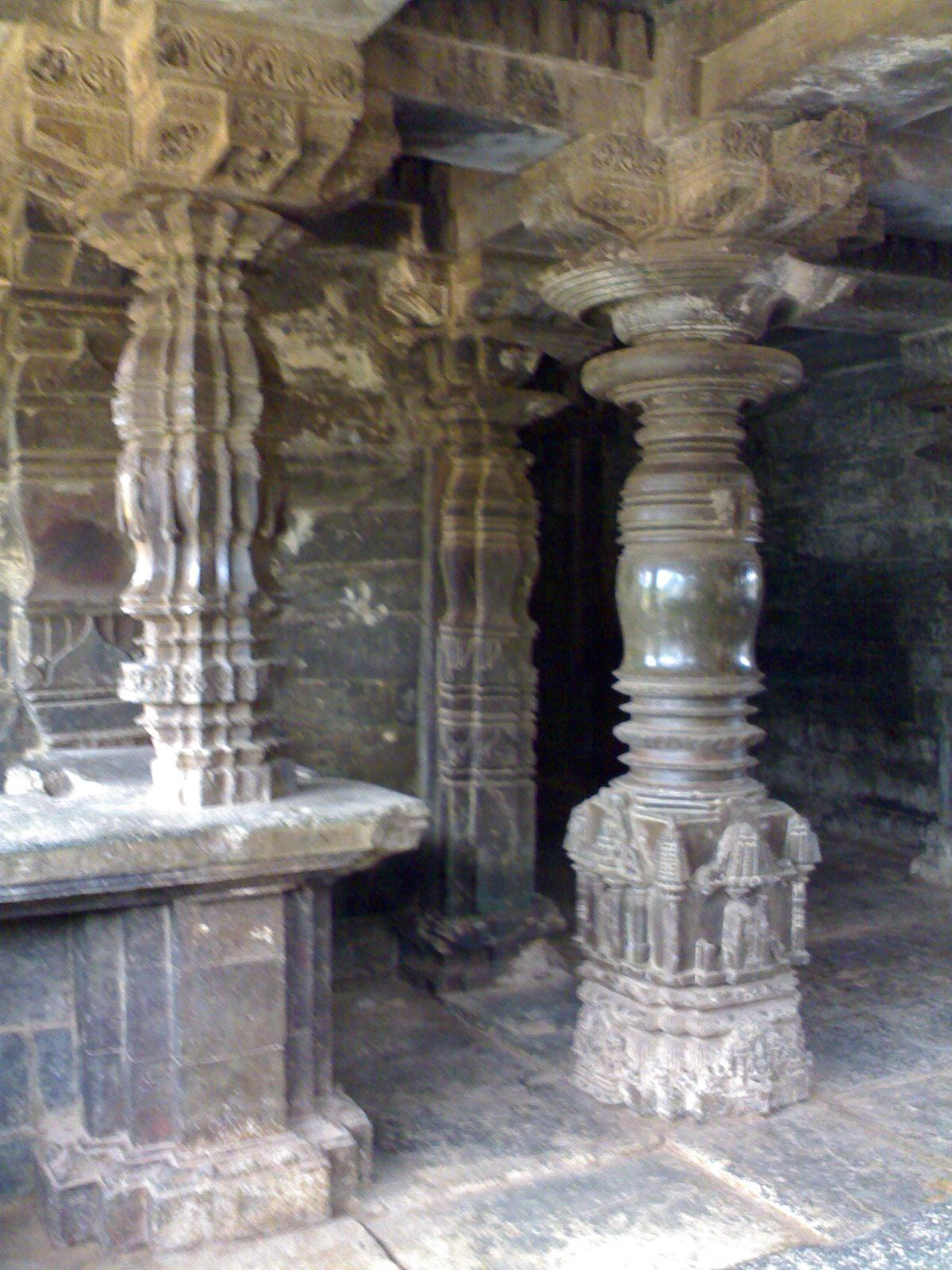
Saraswati temple at Trikuteshwara temple complex

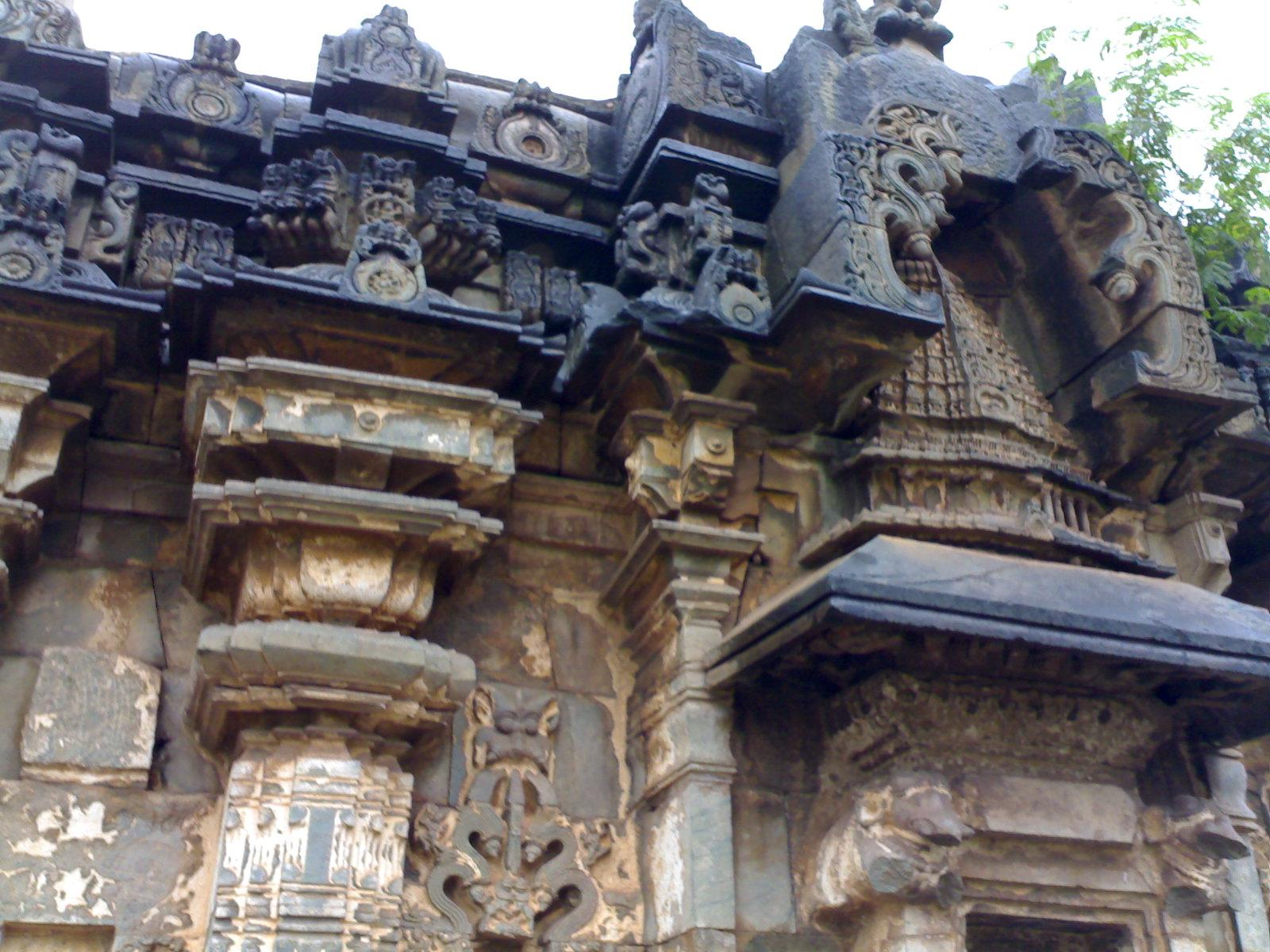
Trikuteshwara temple, Gadag

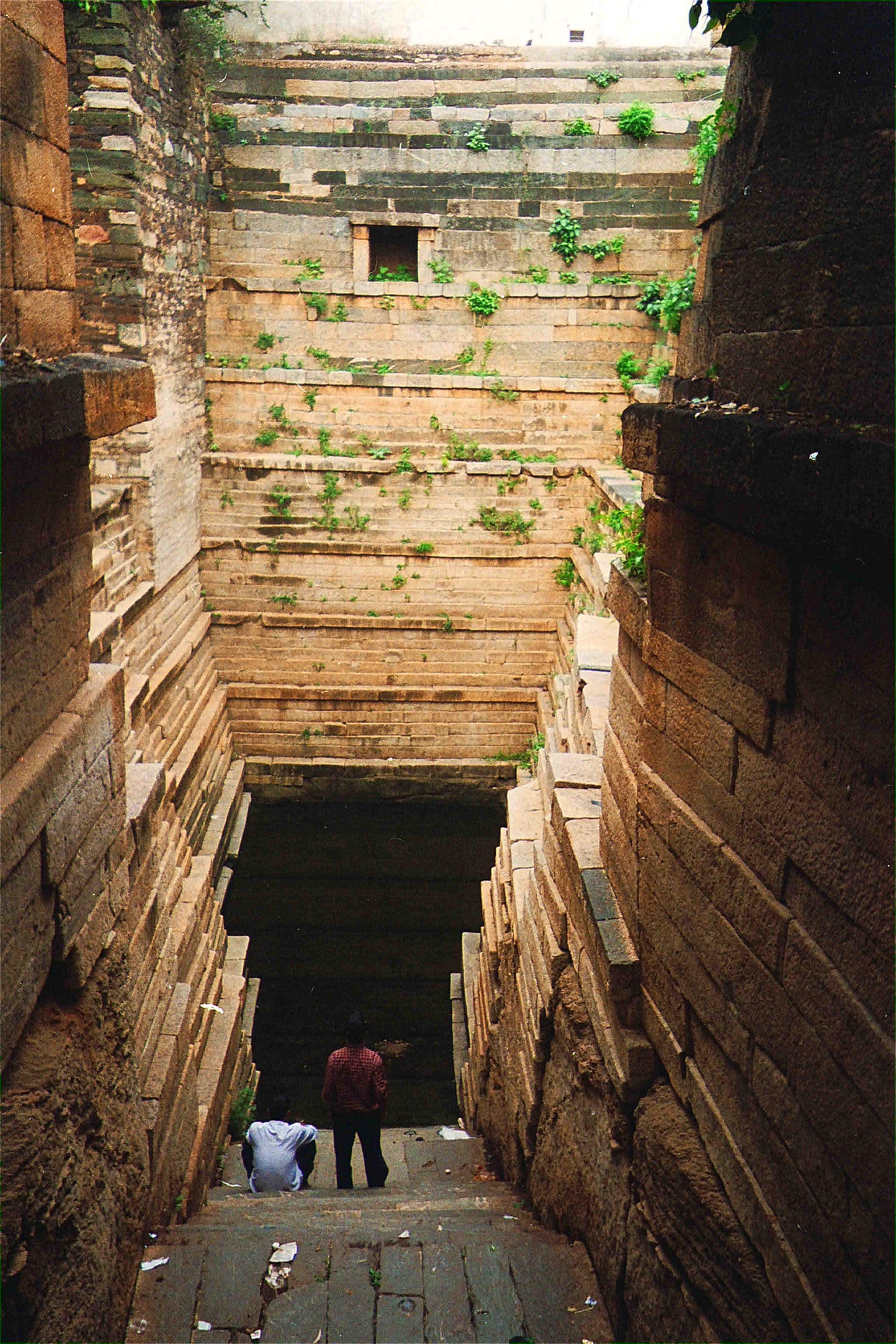
Well at Trikuteshwara Temple, Gadag

== See also ==
- Sirsi Marikamba Temple
- North Karnataka
- Tourism in North Karnataka
- Mahadeva Temple (Itagi)
- Dambal
- Lakkundi
- Annigeri
- Sudi
- Gadag
- Hubli
