= Halligudi =

- Village
- Location within Karnataka Location within India
- Coordinates: 15°24′6″N 75°49′59″E
- Country: India
- State: Karnataka
- District: Gadag district

Languages
  - Official: Kannada
- Time zone: UTC+5:30 (IST)
- PIN: 582113
- Telephone code: 08372
- Vehicle registration: KA-26

Pethalur is a village in the Gadag district of Karnataka State in India.

== See also ==
- Lakkundi
- Dambal
- Hombal
- Harti (Gadag district)
- Gadag
