= Gadag-Betageri =

- City
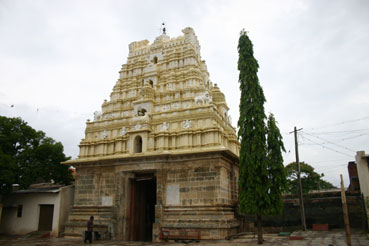
- Veeranarayana Temple
- Interactive map of Gadag-Betageri
- Coordinates: 15.4167°N 75.6167°E
- Country: India
- State: Karnataka
- District: Gadag

Government
  - Type: City Municipal Council (CMC)
  - Body: Gadag-Betageri CMC

Area
  - City: 54.01 km^{2} (20.85 sq mi)
- Elevation: 654 m (2,146 ft)

Population (2010)
  - City: 172,813
  - Density: 4,657/km^{2} (12,060/sq mi)
  - Metro: 367,258
- Time zone: UTC+5:30 (IST)
- PIN: 582 101-103
- Telephone code: 08372
- ISO 3166 code: IN-KA
- Vehicle registration: KA-26
- Official language: Kannada
- Website: gadag-betagericity.mrc.gov.in

Gadag-Betageri is a city municipal council in Gadag district in the state of Karnataka, India. It is the administrative headquarters of Gadag District. The original city of Gadag and its sister city Betageri (or Betgeri) have a combined city administration. The municipality of Gadag-Betageri has a population of 172,813 and an area of 54.0956 km^{2} (20.8864 sq mi). Kanaginahal of Gadag is the birthplace of the first co-operative society in Asia. The temples of Veera Narayana and Trikuteshwara are places of religious and historic importance.

== Transport ==
=== Rail ===
Gadag Junction (station code: GDG) is a major railway junction operating under the Hubballi division of the South Western Railway (SWR) zone and serves as a crucial intersection for three primary lines: routing west towards Hubballi Junction, east towards Hosapete, and north towards Solapur via Vijayapura.

Guntakal-Ballari-Hosapete-Gadag-Hubballi-Vasco da Gama line is freight heavy and connects Steel plants of Ballari to Marmagao Port

The junction serves as a scheduled commercial halt for numerous daily express and intercity trains. It has direct train connectivity to major cities of India like Vasco da Gama, Mangaluru, Bengaluru, Mumbai, Hyderabad, Tirupati, Visakhapatnam, Chennai, Surat, Ahmedabad, Jodhpur, Jaipur, Barmer, Ajmer, New Delhi, Bhubaneswar and Kolkata.

Gadag Bypass Railway Station (station code: GDGB) is built primarily to allow some of the freight and passenger trains on Hubballi-Solapur line to bypass the Gadag main station

=== Road ===
Gadag is well-connected to the state and national road networks.

National Highway 67 (NH 67) facilitates transit between Hubballi and Hosapete.

State Highway 57 (SH 57) and National Highway 48 (NH 48) facilitate transit towards Ranebennur and Bengaluru.

National Highway 52 (NH 52) facilitates transit towards Bagalkote and Vijayapura.

Public road transport is managed by the North Western Karnataka Road Transport Corporation (NWKRTC), which operates an old and a new central bus station in the city providing regular inter-city and inter-state bus services.

=== Air ===
The nearest commercial aviation facility is Hubballi Airport (IATA: HBX), located approximately 60 kilometers west of Gadag. The airport provides scheduled domestic flight connectivity to major metropolitan cities: Delhi, Bengaluru, Pune, Hyderabad, Mumbai, Chennai and Navi Mumbai.

The closest international airport is Dabolim Goa International Airport (IATA: GOI), located approximately 240 kilometers away.

Kempegowda International Airport (IATA: BLR) is the primary international gateway, located approximately 426 kilometers away.

== Gadag Wind Farms and Renewable Energy ==
Gadag contains a cluster of utility-scale onshore wind farms, hybrid renewable facilities, and regional transmission infrastructure located across Gadag district in Karnataka, India. Situated along high-yield wind corridors including the Kappatagudda hill range, Doni, Mundargi, Mulgund, Hombal and Nargund, Gadag is Ranked #2 in the state for wind power generation and a primary epicenter for large-scale wind energy capacity. the region serves as a major renewable energy generation hub in Southern India with over 500+ MW of cumulative operational capacity.

=== Geography and wind potential ===
Gadag District features elevated ridgelines and open plateau terrain that experience strong seasonal winds, particularly during the southwest monsoon (May through September).

=== Key projects and operators ===
Renewable energy allocations, land approvals, and grid connections in the district are regulated by Karnataka Renewable Energy Development Limited (KREDL) alongside central power authorities.

=== Tata Power Renewable Energy ===
- Gadag-TATA Wind Project: A 50.4 MW wind power is operational, and 340MV upcoming project is expected to be completed by 2027.

=== Ayana Renewable Power ===
- Gadag Wind Power Plant: A 302.4 MW wind power is operational.
- A 10 MW dedicated wind power is operational.

=== ReNew Power ===
- A 85.8 MW wind power is operational.
- Multiple 8 MW, 30 MW, and 100 MW wind power is operational and 301 MW upcoming project is expected to be completed by 2027 .

=== Amplus Power ===
42.5 MW Kappatgudda Wind Power is setup by Suzlon and owned by Amplus

=== Legacy installations ===
Older operational wind sectors across Gadag District comprise installations utilizing early-generation wind turbine generators:

- Manufacturers: Suzlon, Enercon, and NEPC.
- Capacity: Legacy installations account for over 190+ MW of cumulative capacity across different power blocks.

=== Grid integration and transmission ===
Electricity generated in Gadag is evacuated through dual grid networks:

1. State Grid: Interconnected via KPTCL to supply regional electricity distribution companies, including Hubli Electricity Supply Company (HESCOM).
2. National Grid (ISTS): High-voltage transmission lines (including 400 kV pooling substations at PGCIL Koppal-II and Gadag-II) evacuate clean energy via the Central Transmission Utility of India (CTUIL) and is distributed across multiple states in India. states like Madhya Pradesh, Maharashtra, Gujarat,West Bengal, Andhra Pradesh, Rajasthan, Delhi, Bihar, Haryana and Uttar Pradesh

=== See also ===
- Wind power in India

== Gadag Schist Belt ==
The Gadag Schist Belt, also known as the Gadag Greenstone Belt, is an ancient geological formation located within the Dharwar Craton of North Karnataka. Dating back 2.5 to 3.0 billion years to the Archean Era, the hills are among the oldest landforms on Earth.

=== Formation and mineralization ===
Over billions of years, tectonic plates collided under extreme heat and pressure, these horizontal layers were buckled and squeezed into near-vertical, wave-like folds known as synclines and anticlines. During this process, mineral-rich hot fluids forced quartz veins through fractures in the rock, forming heavily metalliferous greenstone bedrock containing low to moderate iron ore deposits and significant (auriferous) gold-bearing quartz lodes running across a 40-kilometer stretch of the greenstone belt. However, large-scale commercial extraction is strictly restricted today because the gold-rich zones overlap directly with the Kappatagudda Hill Range, A Karnataka State Protected Conservation Reserve to safeguard its rich biodiversity, medicinal flora, and wildlife

=== Gadag Gold Field ===
The mineralization of the greenstone belt gave rise to the Gadag Gold Field, a historically and economically significant auriferous zone extending over 40 kilometers. Gold is primarily hosted in the structural shears and quartz-carbonate veins that cut through the metavolcanic rocks of the belt. The region features extensive evidence of ancient indigenous gold panning and shallow mining. More intensive, deep-shaft extraction efforts were initiated during the British colonial period in the late 19th and early 20th centuries, with notable historic mining operations centered around villages such as Sangli, and Hosur.

=== Topography and Kappatagudda Microclimate ===
Unlike the tropical rainforests of Dakshina and Uttara Kannada, the hard metavolcanic bedrock of the Gadag Greenstone Belt prevents deep root systems from taking hold, resulting in a treeless, velvet-green low-altitude elevated steppe. Volcanic weathering over millennia has created an exclusive soil chemistry that supports a dense concentration of rare, endemic medicinal plants. The abrupt elevation of the Kappatagudda hill range traps passing moisture and creates a massive natural wind tunnel. These unblocked, high-velocity winds shape the undulating velvet-green grass, drive extensive wind turbine farms, and keep the ambient temperature distinctly cooler than the surrounding arid Deccan plateau.

== Soil profile ==
The elevated hills and ridges of the Gadag Schist Belt are covered by red sandy and loamy soils (Alfisols). Its prominent reddish hue is a direct result of high concentrations of iron oxides—particularly hematite and limonite—leached into the surface layers. Characterized by a porous, well-drained texture, the soil is structurally aerated but naturally low in organic humus, nitrogen, and phosphorus. Agriculturally, these red soil tracts are optimized for rainfed dryland farming, predominantly supporting crops such as groundnut, sunflower, sorghum (jowar), and various pulses.

In sharp contrast, The broader, flat plains of the district are dominated by deep black cotton soils (Vertisols). This clay-rich soil is characterized by its high moisture-retention capacity and its tendency to develop deep fissures during dry seasons—a "self-ploughing" trait that naturally aerates the earth. These fertile plains are extensively cultivated for cotton, which thrives in the soil's deep moisture reserves. This geographical advantage historically established Gadag as one of the primary cotton trading sub-hub

== Etymology and name ==
The city's name is notable for being a palindrome in both the Latin (Gadag) and Kannada (ಗದಗ) scripts. This quality is also present in the Indian Railways station code of the city's major transport hub, Gadag Junction railway station (GDG).

The name Gadag is historically derived from ancient Kannada designations found in Chalukya-era inscriptions, where the settlement was variously recorded as Kratuka, Kratapura, Galadugu, and Gadugu.

== Gadag style of architecture ==
The Gadag style of Architecture, marked by Ornate pillars with intricate sculpture, originated during the period of the Western Chalukya (or Kalyani Chalukyas) king Someswara I, and it flourished for a period of 150 years (During 1050 CE to 1200 CE) during which period some 50 temples were built; some examples being: The Trikuteshwara temple complex at Gadag, The Kasivisvesvara temple, Lakkundi, The Doddabasappa Temple at Dambal, The Amriteshwara temple at Annigeri, etc.

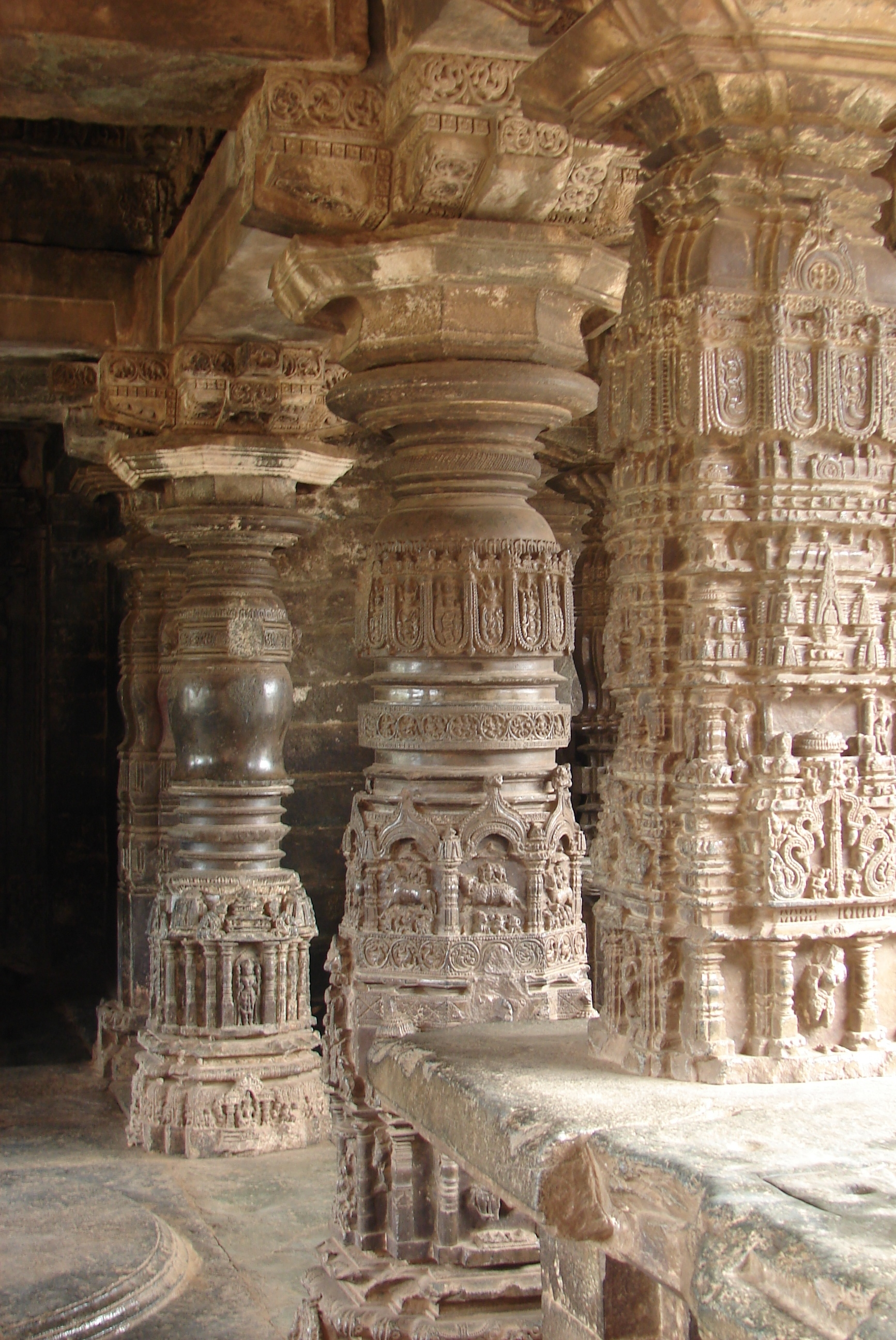
Gadag style Ornate pillars at Sarasvati Temple, Trikuteshwara temple (complex) at Gadag

== Demographics ==
Religions in Gadag-Betageri (2011)
Religion	Percent
Hinduism	73.24%
Islam	23.43%
Christianity	1.50%
Jainism	1.30%
Other or not stated	0.53%
Distribution of religions

Languages of Gadag-Betageri (2011 census)
1. Kannada (68.3%)
2. Urdu (20.8%)
3. 'Other' Gujarati (2.68%)
4. Marathi (2.22%)
5. Hindi (1.96%)
6. Telugu (1.33%)
7. Others (2.73%)

As of 2011 India census, Gadag-Betageri had a population of 172,813. Males constitute 86,165 of the population and females 86,648. Gadag-Betageri has an average literacy rate of 85.56%. The Sex ratio is about 1006 females per 1000 males to females. 18,419 of the population is under 6 years of age. Kannada is the main and widely spoken language, while English and Hindi are spoken and understood by few people.

== Climate ==
Climate data for Gadag (1991–2020, extremes 1932–2020)
Month	Jan	Feb	Mar	Apr	May	Jun	Jul	Aug	Sep	Oct	Nov	Dec	Year
Record high °C (°F)	34.5 (94.1)	37.7 (99.9)	40.0 (104.0)	41.1 (106.0)	41.7 (107.1)	40.6 (105.1)	34.9 (94.8)	35.4 (95.7)	37.8 (100.0)	35.6 (96.1)	37.2 (99.0)	34.1 (93.4)	41.7 (107.1)
Mean daily maximum °C (°F)	30.2 (86.4)	32.7 (90.9)	35.7 (96.3)	37.1 (98.8)	36.3 (97.3)	31.0 (87.8)	28.9 (84.0)	28.8 (83.8)	29.8 (85.6)	30.3 (86.5)	29.8 (85.6)	29.2 (84.6)	31.7 (89.1)
Daily mean °C (°F)	23.2 (73.8)	25.5 (77.9)	28.4 (83.1)	29.6 (85.3)	28.9 (84.0)	25.7 (78.3)	24.6 (76.3)	24.3 (75.7)	24.8 (76.6)	25.2 (77.4)	24.1 (75.4)	22.5 (72.5)	25.6 (78.0)
Mean daily minimum °C (°F)	16.0 (60.8)	17.9 (64.2)	20.9 (69.6)	22.4 (72.3)	22.4 (72.3)	21.7 (71.1)	21.3 (70.3)	20.9 (69.6)	20.7 (69.3)	20.4 (68.7)	18.2 (64.8)	15.8 (60.4)	19.9 (67.8)
Record low °C (°F)	9.6 (49.3)	11.1 (52.0)	13.8 (56.8)	17.2 (63.0)	17.3 (63.1)	16.6 (61.9)	18.5 (65.3)	18.3 (64.9)	15.5 (59.9)	14.2 (57.6)	10.2 (50.4)	9.8 (49.6)	9.6 (49.3)
Average rainfall mm (inches)	0.3 (0.01)	1.9 (0.07)	7.3 (0.29)	39.5 (1.56)	71.5 (2.81)	99.6 (3.92)	77.5 (3.05)	93.6 (3.69)	112.9 (4.44)	123.7 (4.87)	38.7 (1.52)	7.2 (0.28)	673.8 (26.53)
Average rainy days	0.1	0.2	0.8	2.6	4.7	6.5	6.6	8.0	7.9	6.3	1.7	0.4	45.8
Average relative humidity (%) (at 17:30 IST)	31	26	22	27	36	63	71	70	63	54	45	38	45
Source 1: India Meteorological Department
Source 2: Tokyo Climate Center (mean temperatures 1991–2020)

== Notable people ==
- Kumara Vyasa - Gadag immediately brings to mind the name of Naranappa, popularly known as Kumara Vyasa, the author of Karnata Bharata Kathamanjari. It is the classic Mahabharata in Kannada. Naranappa was born in the nearby village of Koliwada. He composed his work sitting before Lord Veera Narayana, his chosen deity.
- Ganayogi Panchakshara Gawai, visually challenged singer from Gadag. His music school Veereshwara Punyashrama is a renowned institution in north Karnataka.
- Puttaraj Gawai, recipient of the "Padma Bhushan" Award from Govt Of India, visually challenged Indian musician (classical Hindustani tradition), scholar, music teacher and social servant. A student of Ganayogi Panchakshara Gawai (above). He headed the Veereshwara Punyashrama until he died in late 2010.
- Shri Aluru Venkataraya

Shri Aluru Venkataraya from Holealur is revered as Karnataka Kulapurohita (High priest of the Kannada family) in the Karnataka region for his contribution towards the cause of a separate Karnataka state. He became famous for undertaking a Karnataka Ekikarana movement in support of the formation of a state for the Kannada-speaking population of Mysore, Bombay Presidency and the Nizam's Hyderabad.

- Bhimsen Joshi, Hindustani singer, recipient of the Bharat Ratna Award - Highest Civilian Honour of India
- Sunil Joshi, cricketer, born in Gadag.
- Huilgol Narayana Rao, writer of "Udayavagali namma cheluva kannada nadu" the anthem which heralded the birth of Karnataka state.
- Vijay Sankeshwar, businessman, founder of VRL Group, Vijaya Karnataka newspaper and Vijayavani.
- Vilas Nilgund, runner, who represented India in 100 metre sprint, and 4x100 metre.
- R. S. Mugali famous writer and author of "Kannada Sahitya Charitre"
- Giraddi Govindaraj famous critic and former president of "Karnataka Sahitya Akademi"
- G. B. Joshi famous playwright and founder of "Manohara Granthamala"
- H. K. Patil Indian National Congress (INC) party politician and currently minister in Government of Karnataka.

== See also ==
- Lakkundi
