= Savadi, Gadag =

Savadi Sayyadi
- Village
- Nickname: sayyadi
- Location within Karnataka Location within India
- Coordinates: 15°38′49″N 75°40′33″E
- Country: India
- State: Karnataka
- District: Gadag district
- Taluk: Ron
- Lok Sabha Constituency: Haveri

Population (2001)
  - Total: 6,939

Languages
  - Official: Kannada
- Time zone: UTC+5:30 (IST)
- PIN: 582 209
- Vehicle registration: KA 26

Savadi is a village in the Ron taluk of Gadag district in the Indian state of Karnataka.

== Demographics ==
As of 2001 India census, Savadi had a population of 6,939 with 3,527 males and 3,412 females and 1,374 Households.

== History ==
Savadi in ancient times was known as Sayyadi (Kannada: ಸಯ್ಯಡಿ) and Saividi (Kannada: ಸೈವಿಡಿ) . Durgasimha adapted Panchatantra from Sanskrit to Kannada in Sayyadi. Savadi or Sayyadi is also famous for the ancient Narayana and Brahmeshwara Temple. The Chalukyan era Brahmalingeshwara Temple of Lord Brahma is a compact structure, stellate design Vesara style temple.

== See also ==
- Naregal
- Abbigeri
- Sudi
- Gajendragad
- Ron
- Gadag
- Karnataka
