= Abbigeri =

Abbigeri may refer to several places in India:

- Abbigeri, Koppal
- Abbigeri, Gadag
