= Cherambane =

Village in Kodagu district, Karnataka, India

Cherambane ಚೇರಂಬಾಣೆ
- village
- Interactive map of Cherambane
- Coordinates: 12.3659941°N 75.6339017°E
- Country: India
- State: Karnataka
- District: Kodagu
- Taluk: Madikeri

Cherambane is a village located in the Kodagu district of Karnataka, India. It lies in the western part of the state, near the Western Ghats.

== Geography ==
Cherambane is located approximately 24 km from Madikeri.The terrain is hilly and surrounded by coffee estates, pepper farms, and forest areas.

== Demographics ==
According to the 2011 Census, Cherambane is a village located in the Madikeri taluk of Kodagu district, Karnataka. While specific population data is not individually reported, the village reflects the broader demographic patterns of the region.

The primary language spoken in Cherambane is Kodava Takk, the native tongue of the Kodava community. Kannada is the official state language and is widely used in administration and education. Minority languages include Are Bhashe, a dialect of Kannada, and Malayalam, owing to the village's proximity to the Kerala border.

Most residents follow Hinduism, with minorities practicing Christianity and Islam. The literacy rate in Kodagu district is approximately 82.5%, with a male literacy rate of 87.4% and a female literacy rate of 77.6%.

== Religion and culture ==
Cherambane and its surrounding areas are home to several temples and sacred groves that reflect the cultural and spiritual traditions of the region.

- Kottur Shree Gopala Krishna Temple: Located on the Madikeri - Tala Kaveri Road, this temple is dedicated to Lord Krishna and is a significant place of worship for the local community.
- Mahavishnu Temple: A local place of worship devoted to Lord Vishnu.

In addition to formal temples, Cherambane is also known for its sacred groves (Devara Kadu), which are protected forest areas considered holy by the community.

- Eeroli Bana: Located in the nearby Thaaka village, this sacred grove is dedicated to Lord Aiyappa and covers over 800 acres. Entry is restricted, except during annual religious rituals and festivals.

The village is also mentioned in relation to Siddharudha Swami due to his visits to a local Matha.

== Economy ==
The economy of Cherambane is primarily based on agriculture, with paddy and coffee being the main crops.

Tourism is also growing, with homestays like Cloud Valley attracting visitors. However, locals have raised concerns about resource strain due to increased tourist activity.

== Transport ==
Cherambane is accessible by road, with regular KSRTC bus services connecting it to nearby towns such as Madikeri and Bhagamandala.

The village is connected via State Highways 90 and 89, facilitating road travel from various parts of Karnataka.

There is no railway station within 10 km of Cherambane; the nearest major railway stations are in Mysuru and Mangaluru.

The closest airports are Mysore Airport (approximately 155 km away) and Mangalore International Airport (approximately 140 km away).
