= Durgasimha =

11th century Indian politician and translator

Durgasimha (c. 1025) was the minister of war and peace (Sandhi Vigrahi) of Western Chalukya King Jayasimha II (also known as Jagadekamalla, r. 1018–1042). Durgasimha adapted the well-known set of fables, Panchatantra ("The five stratagems"), from Sanskrit language into the Kannada language in champu style (mixed prose and verse). The Kannada-language version, whose central theme has a strong Jain bent, contains 60 fables, 13 of which are original stories. All the stories have morality as their theme and carry a summary section (Katha Shloka). The Kannada version is the earliest Indian vernacular version, and the author, being a minister, not surprisingly, chose to write a book on political science (Rajniti). The scholar R. Narasimhachar fixed the date of this work as c. 1025, but the modern Kannada poet and scholar Govinda Pai dated the work to 8 March 1031, based on information in the concluding stanza of the manuscript.

== About the author ==
Durgasimha was a Brahmin by birth and is known to have belonged to the Smartha Bhagavata sub-sect of Hinduism, a community which gives equal importance to the Hindu gods Shiva and Vishnu. He was a native of Kisukadu Nadu, another name for ancient Karnataka, and was a resident of the Sayyadi Brahmin school of higher learning (agrahara).

== History of Panchatantra literature ==
Although the original text of the Panchatantra is lost, it was evidently an independent work written in Sanskrit around 300 CE (give or take a century or two). Within the text its putative author is often given as Vishnu Sharma, but there is no evidence indicating this to be a real person, as opposed to a fictional story-telling figure. Durgasimha's translation is based on the so-called "Southern Panchatrantra" — a version closely resembling the original, which also engendered several other Indian vernacular versions, as well as the Hitopadesha.

=== Legendary origin ===
However, Durgasimha (or his source) puts forward his own legendary textual history, based on the assumption that the Panchatantra was originally part of the Brihatkatha (when in fact "[i]t appears that the original Bṛhatkathā did not include the Pañcatantra, but a later version made in Kashmir or north-western India seems to have inserted the Pañcatantra into its repertoire of stories").

Durgasimha's version states that Pushpadatta, a chief attendant of the Hindu god Shiva overheard Shiva telling his consort Parvati a great story. This story was later reproduced as Brihatkatha in Paishachi by Gunadhya, a reincarnation of Pushpadatta, and a court poet of king Shalivahana. He further states that the Sanskrit version by Vasubhaga Datta (who replaces Vishnu Sharma as the putative author in several of the "Southern" versions) was a selection of "five stories" from the Paishachi original, and hence the name Panchatantra ("The five stratagems").
