= Belavanaki =

Belavanaki Bolunki
- Village
- Belavanki
- Interactive map of Belavanaki
- Coordinates: 12.9779204°N 77.5687766°E
- Country: India
- State: Karnataka
- District: Gadag
- Founder: Ganga subordinate Bhutayya was the ruler of Belvola-300 in A.D 942
- Named for: Belavalanaadu-300
- Talukas: Ron

Government
  - Type: Gram panchayat
  - Body: Belavanaki Gram Panchayat

Population (2001)
  - Total: 5,118
- Demonym: Belavanakiyava

Languages
  - Official: Kannada
- Time zone: UTC+5:30 (IST)
- Postal code: 582202
- Area code: 08381
- Vehicle registration: KA26
- Nearest city: Hubballi and Gadag
- Literacy: 71.41%
- Climate: Climatic regions of India (Köppen)

Belavanaki is a village in southern state of Karnataka, India. It is located in Ron Taluka of Gadag district in Karnataka. It belongs to Belagavi Division.

== Profile ==
- Gram Panchayat: Belavanaki
- Number of Wards:06
- Number of Home hold:1,002 (census 2001)
- Assembly Constituency:Naragund Constituency
- Lokasabha Constituency: Bagalkot Lokasabha
- Member of Parliament:P C Gaddigoudar
- Member of Legislative Assembly: C C Patil (Naragund)

== History and origin of the village name ==
According to the Ron inscription introduces the Ganga subordinate Mahamandalika Butayya as the governor of Gangavadi-96,000, Belvola-300, Puligere-300 provinces in Saka 864 (A..D. 942) while his Kurtakoti inscription mentions the chief as holding charge of the same provinces in Saka 868 (A.D. 946) therefore scriptures of Rastrakuta and Chalukyas of Kalyana dynasties shows the existence of this village goes back to ninth and 10th century and it is also ruled by Maratha king Shivaji and Peshwas of 17th and 18th century. This village name may be derived from old name of ‘Belavala-nadu 300’(Deccan Plains) or Belvola-300 which means region consisting of 300 villages and also means fertile land.

== People and village features ==
In the local dialect, Belavanaki is often referred to as "Bolunki" or "Bolunaki." It is considered one of the most important villages in the region, particularly in terms of development. The village is home to various educational institutions and small-scale industries, such as cotton mills, which trace their origins back to the British colonial period. These mills were established by local feudal landlords and typically operate during the harvest season. A notable feature of these mills is their old-world charm, with monumental structures and buildings at the heart of the village.

Belavanaki is well-connected by five roads, including a state highway, which has contributed to its transformation into a semi-urban area. The village boasts schools, colleges, a bank, a cinema theatre, and a primary health center. These urban-like amenities attract people from the surrounding villages to Belavanaki. Additionally, the village is the birthplace of S.R.Hiremath, a prominent social activist and the Founder President of Samaja Parivarthana Samudaya, the National Committee for Protection of Natural Resources, and India Development Service.

== Culture and temples ==
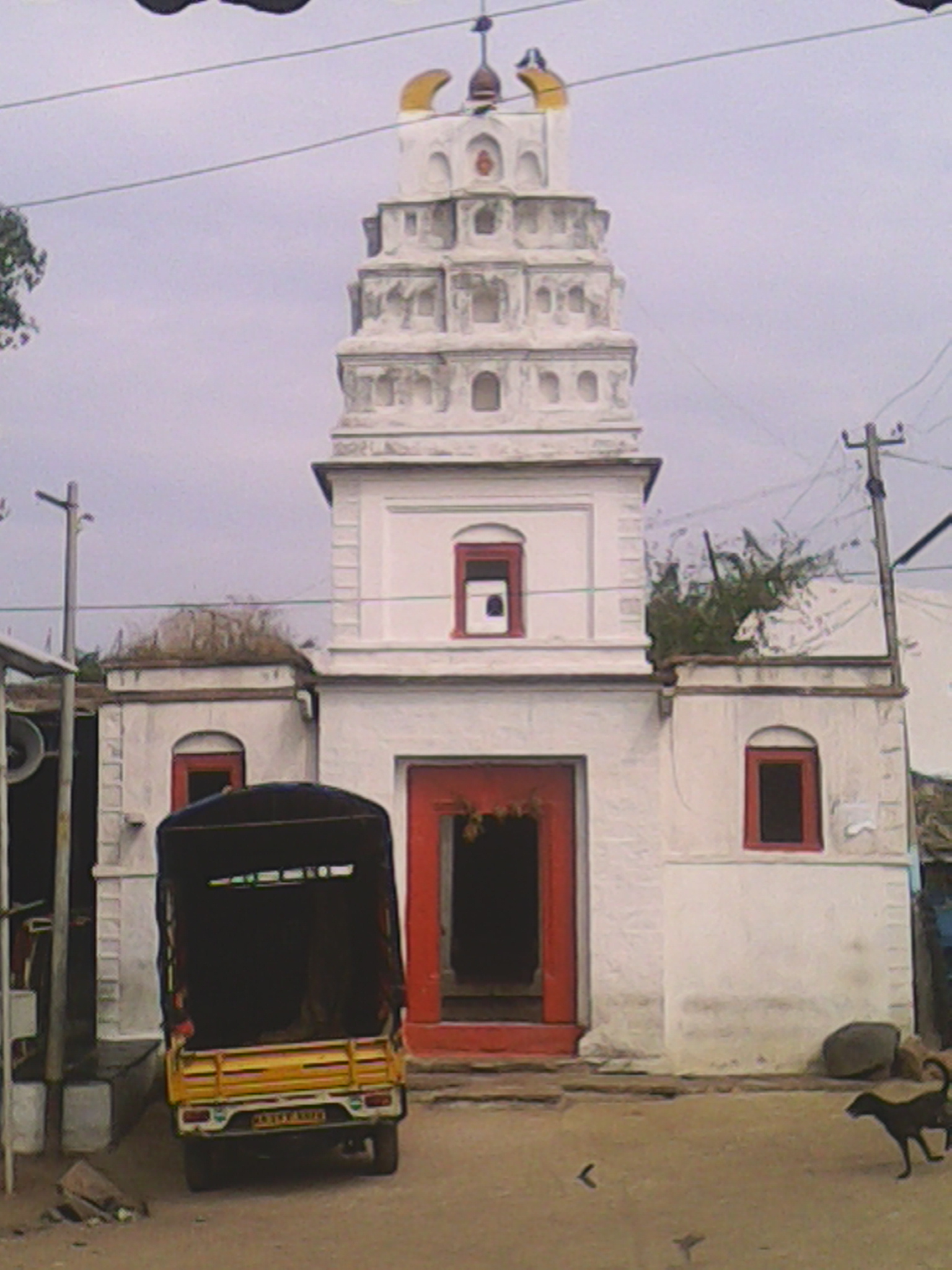
Rayara Temple in Belavanaki

In Belavanaki, the majority of the people are Hindus and Muslims. As a result, the festivals celebrated in the village are centered around these two religions. However, despite their different religious beliefs, both communities come together to celebrate almost all the festivals. This reflects the village's cultural heritage and the harmony between the two religions. Local attractions include,

- Shree Veerabadreswara temple
- Rayara temple
- Basavanna Devara temple
- Mustigeri Dyamamma temple
- Gaali Durgamma temple
- Maruti temple
- Gurulingammmana Matt
- Balaganur Math
- Laxmi temple.
- Shivananda temple
- Gowri Gudi
- Amareshwara temple
- Mylaradevara Gudi
- Kappatana Gudi
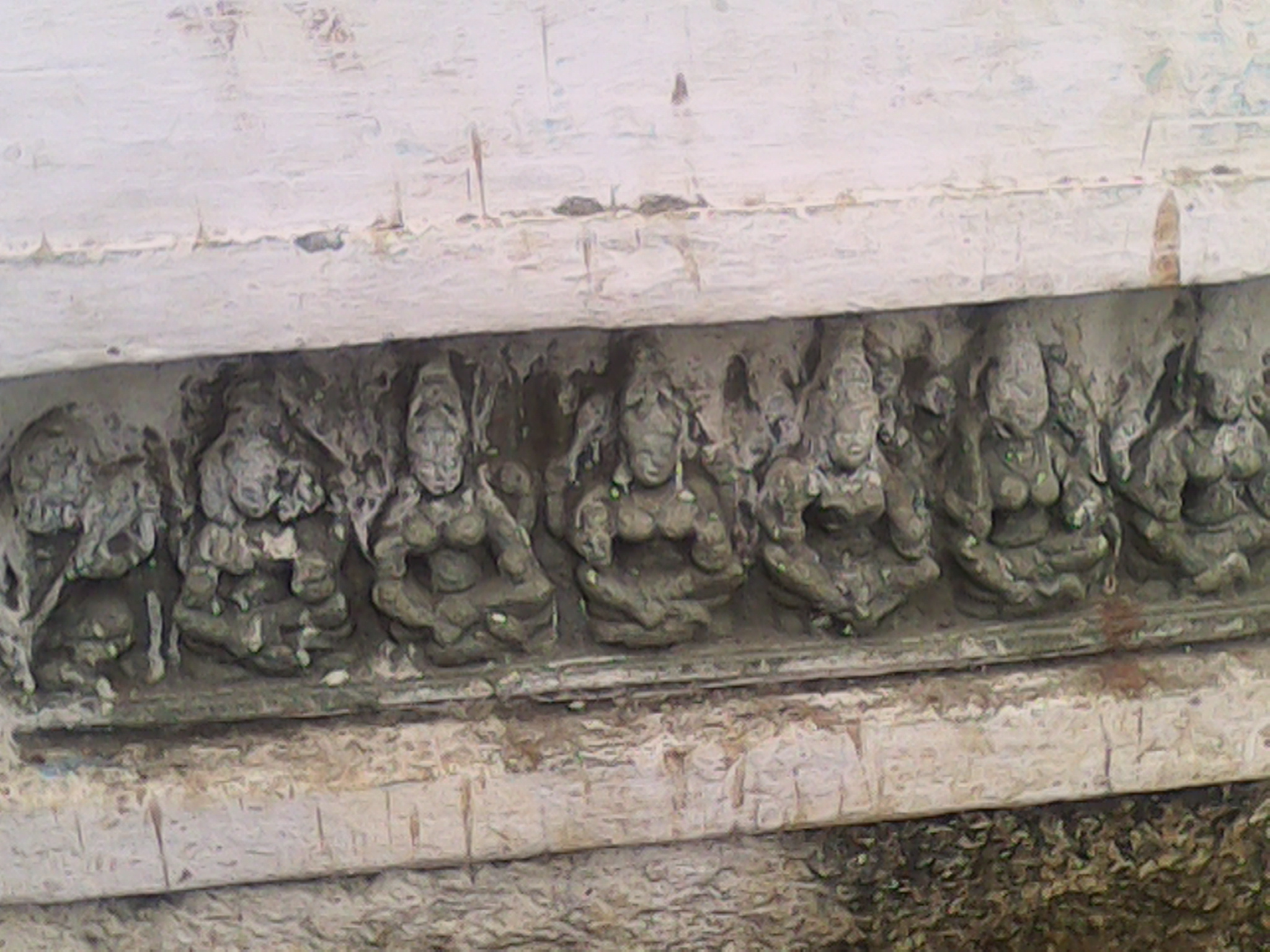
  Saptamtrikas sculpture in Belavanaki (Near Veerabhadra Temple) Saptamatrika, "seven mothers": Brahmani, Vaishnavi, Maheshvari, Indrani, Kaumari, Varahi, Chamunda, and Narasimhi
- Doddeswara Gudi
- Kallibasaveswara Temple

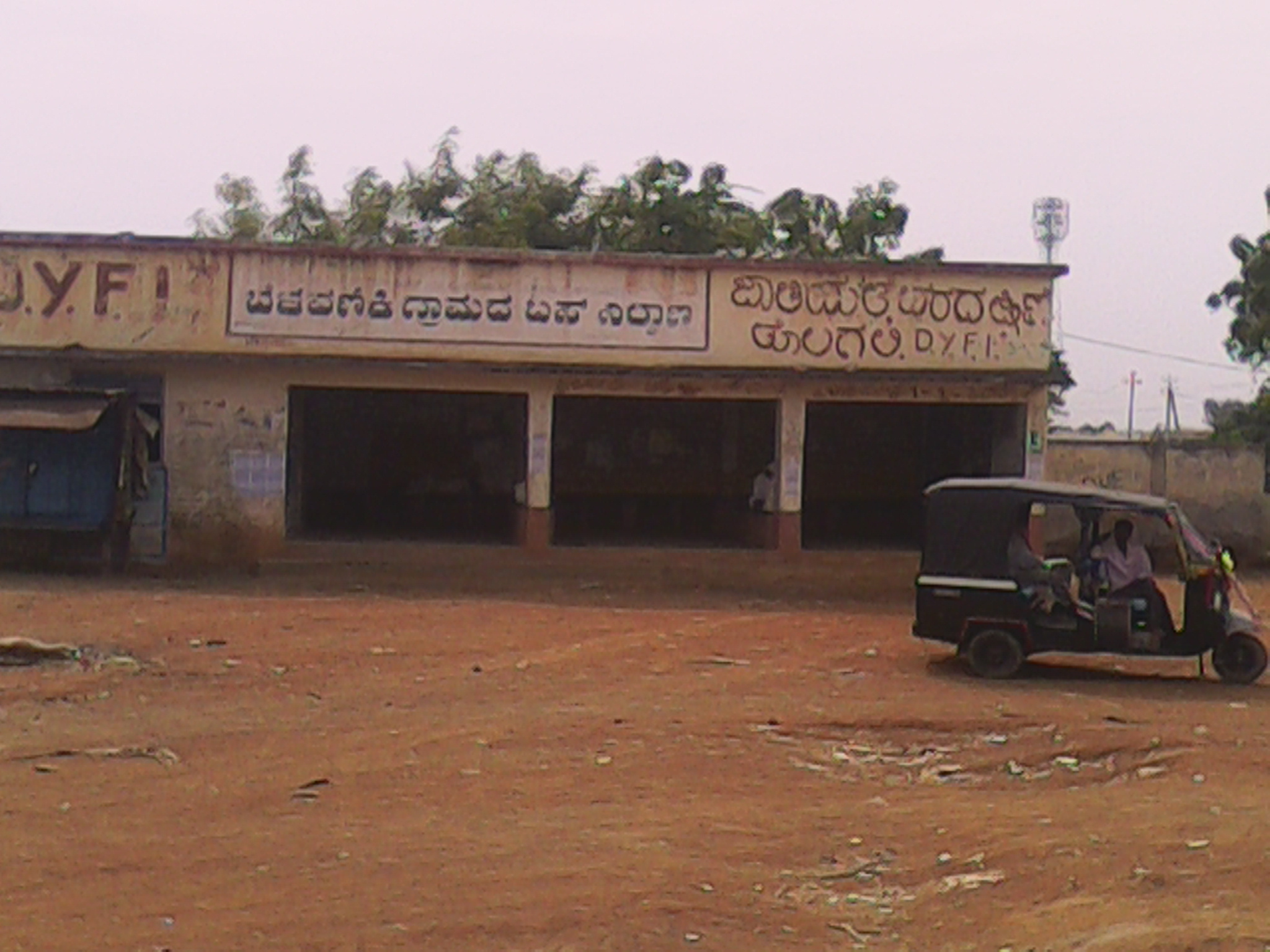
Belavanaki Bus stand

- Katti Basavannana Gudi
- Nagappana Katti
- Akka Mahadevi Gudi
- Nandhi Basavannana Gudi.
- Mecca Masjid

The newly carved statue of Veerabhadra in Belavanaki is considered one of the finest sculptures in Karnataka in recent times. As a result, people from various parts of the state come here to visit this temple..

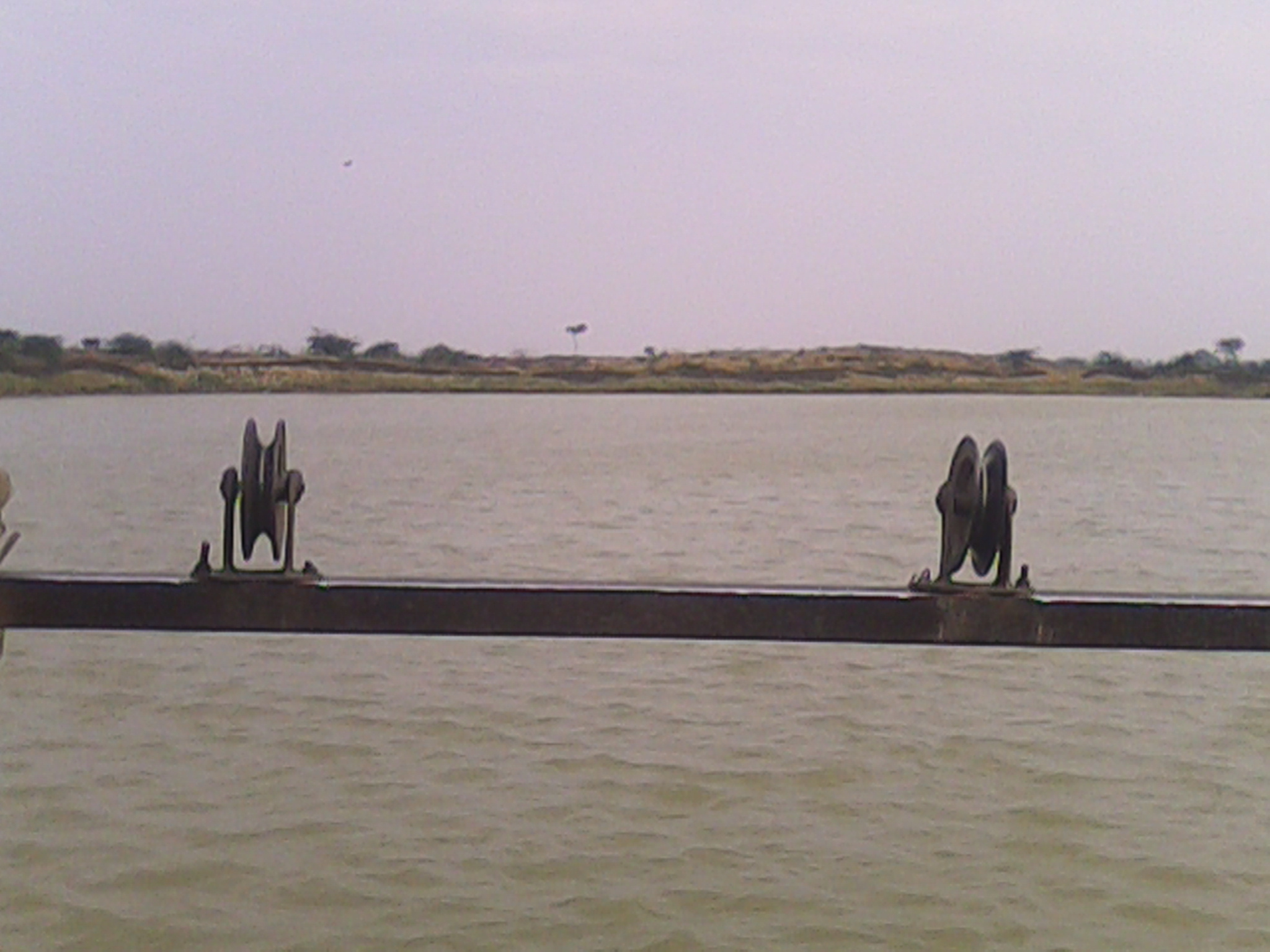
Belavanaki Main Lake for Drinking water

== Youth and self help groups ==
Belavanaki is also not lagging behind in establishing organizations, cooperative societies, and self-help groups in the village. The youth and peasant unions are strong forces in raising issues concerning youths, farmers, women, and students in Gram Sabha meetings.

Names of the youth and self-help groups in Belavanaki

- Bhumika Mahila swasahay sangha
- Salumarada Timmakka Swasahay Sangha
- Annapurneshwari Swasahay Sangha
- Vidyashree Swasahay Sangha
- Lakshmi Devi
- Renuka Sthri Shakti Sangha
- Sharada swasahay sangha
- Akkamahadevi Swasahay Sangha
- Dhaneshwari sthri Shakti Sangha
- Dyamavva Swasahay Sangha
- Gajanana Geleyara Balaga

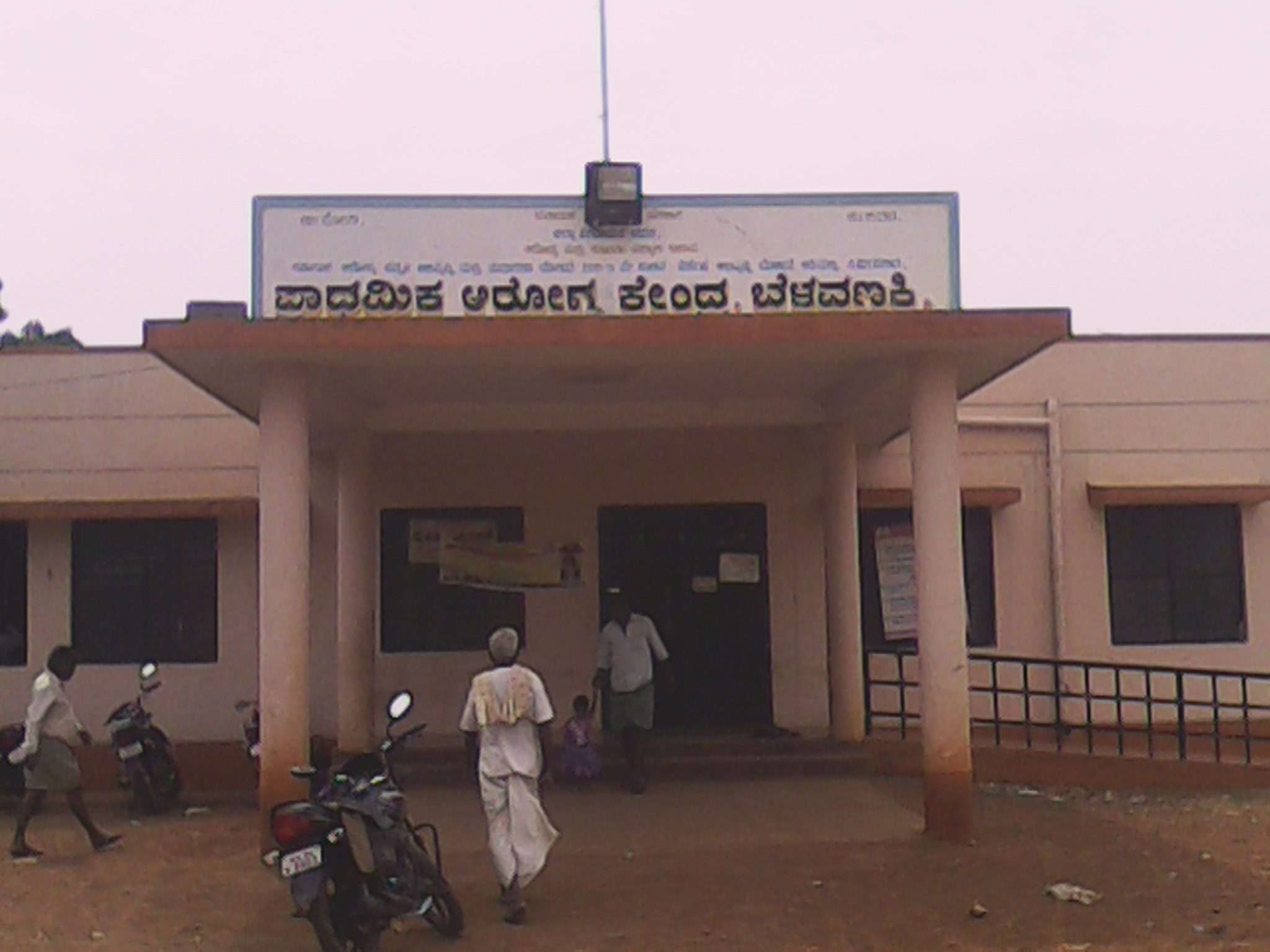
Belavanaki Primary Health Center

- Bhagath Singh Yuvakara sangha

== Education institutions ==
- Shree Veerabadreswara arts and commerce composite pre-university College
- Kannada boys’ model school
- Kannada girl's model school
- Government Urdu primary School
- Navadarshan nursery English medium school

== Demographics ==
As of 2001 India census, Belavanaki had a population of 5118 with 2642 males and 2476 females.

The population of children age 0–6 is 533 which makes up 11.01% of total population of village. Average Sex Ratio of Belavanaki village is 945 which is lower than Karnataka state average of 973. Child Sex Ratio for the Belavanaki as per census is 864, lower than Karnataka average of 948. village has lower literacy rate compared to Karnataka. In 2011, literacy rate of Belavanaki village was 71.41% compared to 75.36% of Karnataka. In Belavanaki Male literacy stands at 81.74% while female literacy rate was 60.60%.

== See also ==
- Gadag
- Districts of Karnataka
