= Ron, Karnataka =

Rona
- Town
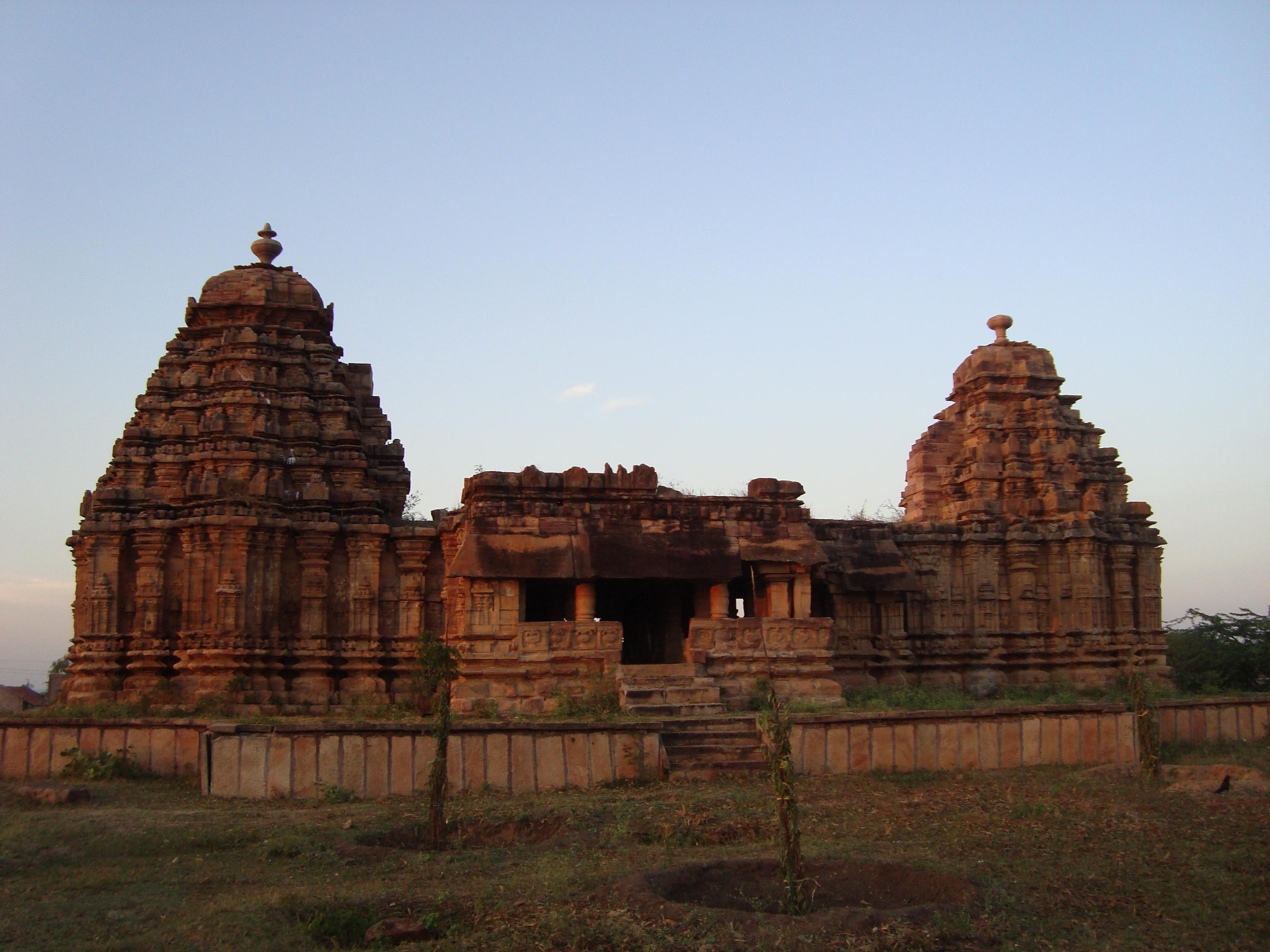

- Location in Karnataka, India Rona (India)
- Coordinates: 15.67°N 75.73°E
- Country: India
- State: Karnataka
- District: Gadag
- Lok Sabha Constituency: Haveri

Government
  - Body: Town Municipal Council

Area
  - Town: 68.65 km^{2} (26.51 sq mi)
  - Rural: 1,118 km^{2} (432 sq mi)
- Elevation: 592 m (1,942 ft)

Population (2011)
  - Town: 23,311
  - Density: 339.6/km^{2} (879.5/sq mi)
  - Rural: 191,763
- Time zone: UTC+5:30 (IST)
- PIN: 582 209
- ISO 3166 code: IN-KA
- Vehicle registration: KA 26
- Website: http://www.ronatown.mrc.gov.in

Ron or Rona is a taluka headquarters in Gadag district, Karnataka in India.

Bhimsen Joshi was born in Ron in his mother’s house.

== Tourism ==
- Siddharudha Swami temple - the famous temple/ matha known as Siddharudha Matha at Ron. On the eve of Ramanavami, the birth anniversary of Shri Siddhaaroodha Swaami is celebrated by pulling the famous carved car of the temple. Annadaana is performed for thousands of devotees on this day. Seven days of Saptaha is conducted at this temple.

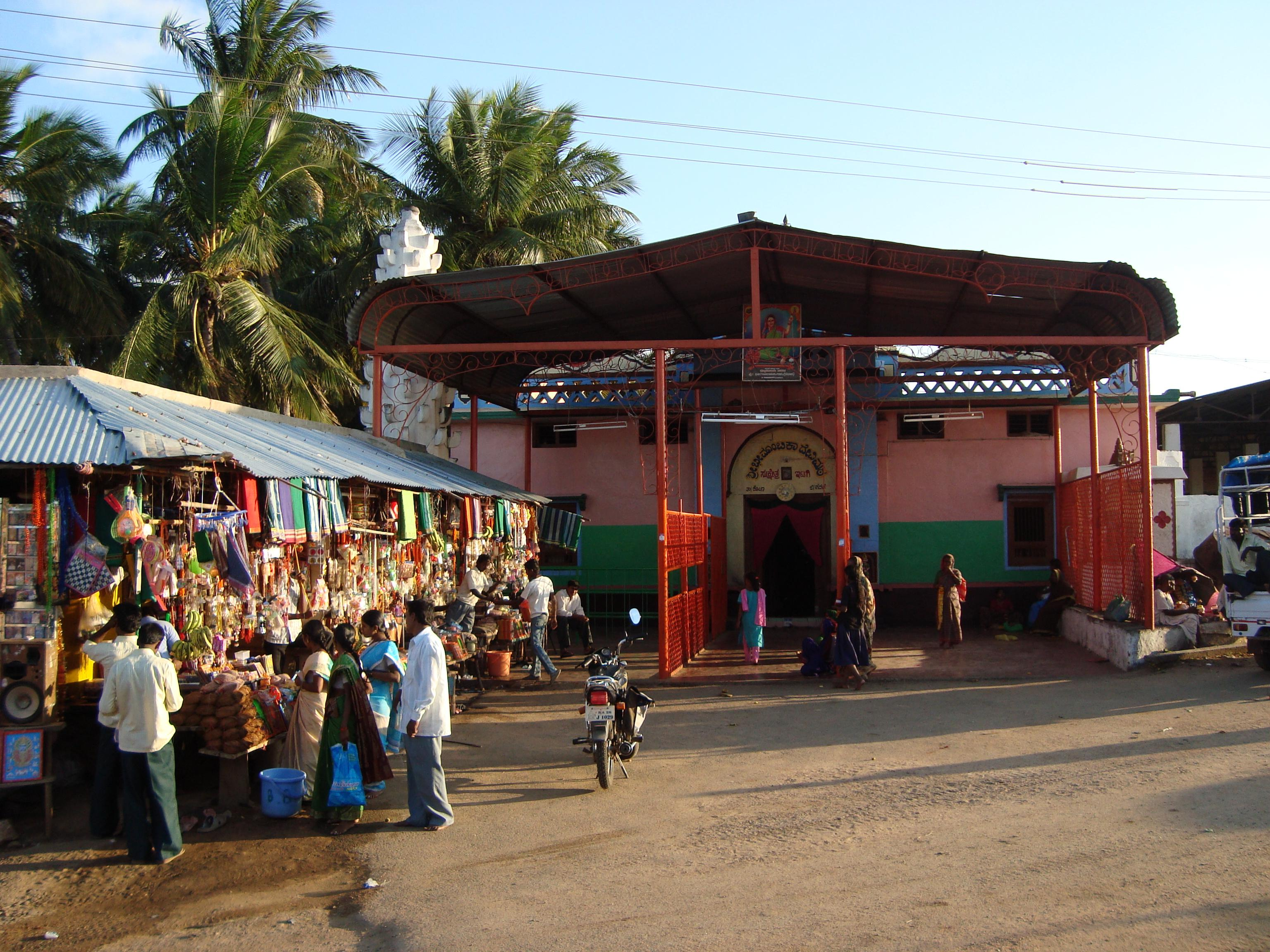
Itagi Bhimambika Temple, near Gajendragad, Karnataka

- Itagi Bhimambika temple - The famous temple known as Itagi Bheemavva at Itagi, is about 13 km away from Kalkaleshwara temple, Gajendragad. Thousands of believers throng everyday to this place to get their wishes fulfilled by this female deity. They tie coconuts and wish for their desires to be fulfilled. There is a historical Shiva temple here.
- Sudi (ಸೂಡಿ),- is a panchayat town in the Gadag District of Karnataka, India. At one time it was a key town of the Kalyani Chalukyas during 1000 AD. It is famous for rare stone carved monuments like twin towered temple and large well built of stone and carvings, and few other structural temples. For long time these amazing structures were abandoned, but recently they caught the eye of the Indian Archeological Department.
- Belavanaki (ಬೆಳವಣಿಕಿ) - History of Belavanaki goes back to ancient time. According to the Ron inscription introduces the Ganga subordinate Mahamandalika Butayya as the governor of Gangavadi-96,000, Belvola-300, Puligere-300 provinces in Saka 864 (=A..D. 942) while his Kurtakoti inscription mentions the chief as holding charge of the same provinces in Saka 868 (=A.D. 946) therefore scriptures of Rastrakuta and Chalukyas of Kalyana dynasties shows the existence of this village goes back to ninth and 10th century and it is also ruled by Maratha king Shivaji and Peshwas of 17th and 18th century. This village name may be derived from old name of ‘Belavala-nadu 300’(Deccan Plains) or Belvola-300 means region consist of 300 villages and also mean fertile land. in Belavanaki the statue of Veerabadra is considered to be best sculpture in Karnataka, therefore it has mentioned in Dharwad District Gazetter (English-M R Palande.1959.Kannada-Suryanath Kamath.1995). It is also a birthplace of S. R. Hiremath social activist and Founder President of Samaja Parivarthana Samudaya, National Committee for Protection of Natural Resources and India Development Service.

== See also ==
- North Karnataka
- Tourism in North Karnataka
- Gajendragarh
- Sudi
- Itagi Bhimambika
- Naregal, Gadag
- Kuknur
- Gadag District
