= S. R. Hiremath =

Indian activist

S.R.Hiremath
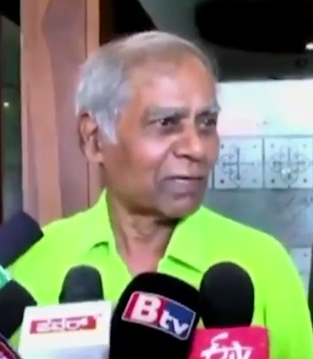
- S. R. Hiremath in 2022

Founder President of Samaja Parivarthana Samudaya, National Committee for Protection of Natural Resources and India Development Service

Personal details
- Born: 5 November 1944 (age 81) Hubli, Karnataka, India
- Education: B.V.B. College of Engineering and Technology

S.R.Hiremath (Sangaih Rachayya Hiremath; born 5 November 1944, Belavanaki, Ron, Karnataka), is an Indian environmental and anti-corruption activist based in the state of Karnataka. He is the founder president of Samaja Parivarthana Samudaya (Community for Social Change), a Non Governmental Organization for the Promotion of people oriented policies and legislation, Protection the rights of the tribals and rural poor over natural resources and the empowerment of Panchayat institutions, and he is a member of Karnatak Lingayat Education Society, Hiremath also founded National Committee for Protection of Natural Resources. He is best known for his relentless fight against the Illegal Mining mafia that took place in Karnataka and successfully challenging many political heavyweights and government executives associated with illegal mining. His organization is the recipient of the highest Environmental honour in India, Indira Gandhi Paryavaran Puraskar, an award accoladed for encouraging the public participation in environment, instituted by Ministry of Environment and Forests, Government of India.

== Personal life ==
Hiremath graduated in Mechanical Engineering from B.V.B. College of Engineering and Technology. Later, he worked as an Investment Banker in various public and private corporations in Pune including in Federal Reserve Bank of Chicago as an Advisor until 2019 he is decided to pursue the cause of Environment, Natural Resources and Sustainable Development.

== Awards and honours ==
- Indira Gandhi Paryavaran Puraskar, 2015.
- Jaap van Praag International Award, 2016 by Hivos, Netherlands.
- Rajyotsava Prashasti, 2018 by Government of Karnataka.
- ‘Press Club's Man of the Year Award, 2013 by PRESS Club Of Bangalore.
- Person of the Year, 2014 by Kannada Oneindia.in
