= Abbigeri, Koppal =

Abbigeri
- village
- Location in Karnataka, India Abbigeri (India)
- Coordinates: 15.4383300°N 76.263540°E
- Country: India
- State: Karnataka
- District: Koppal
- Talukas: Koppal

Government
  - Body: Village Panchayat

Languages
  - Official: Kannada
- Time zone: UTC+5:30 (IST)
- ISO 3166 code: IN-KA
- Vehicle registration: KA
- Nearest city: Koppal
- Civic agency: Village Panchayat
- Website: karnataka.gov.in

Abbigeri (Koppal) is a village in the southern state of Karnataka, India. It is located in the Koppal taluk of Koppal district.

== See also ==
- Koppal
- Districts of Karnataka
