= Sudi, India =

Sudi
- Panchayat town
- Twin Towered Temple at Sudi
- Interactive map of Sudi
- Coordinates: 15°43′48″N 75°51′54″E
- Country: India
- State: Karnataka
- District: Gadag

Area
  - Total: 5.3 km^{2} (2.0 sq mi)
- Elevation: 586 m (1,923 ft)

Population (2001)
  - Total: 6,000
  - Density: 1,100/km^{2} (2,900/sq mi)

Sudi, is a panchayat town in the Gadag District of Karnataka, India. It is about 30 km from Badami, 12 km from Gajendragad and 3 km from Itagi Bhimambika temple. In the past it was an important town of the Kalyani Chalukyas during 1000 AD. It is notable for rare stone carved monuments like Twin towered temple, Mallikarjuna temple and nagakunda (large well built of stone and carvings), and few other structural temples. For long time these structures were abandoned, but recently they caught the eye of the Indian Archaeological Department (ASI - Archaeological Survey of India).

== History ==
Core area of Western Chalukya architectural activity in modern Karnataka state, India

Sudi belongs to the core area of Western Chalukya architectural activity in modern Karnataka (particularly North Karnataka).

Padevala Taila (son of Nagadeva), continued to serve under Satyashraya (succeeded his father Taila in 997 AD) and his mother Attiyabbe made a grant in 1005 A.D. Satyashraya had two daughters. Vradhamabbarasi and Akkadevi and one son Kundin (Kundiraja). Akkadevi was a good administrator and was governing some division during the time of Satyashraya and his successors. Kundiraja was placed in charge of divisions like Banavasi 12,000 and Santalige 1,000.

Akkadevi and Kundin, continued to govern (dating 8_October_1013 AD) some provinces of the Chalukya Empire during the reign of Vikramaditya.

Sudi was the capital of the Kalyani Chalukyas in 1100 AD. Kalyani Chalukyas king's daughter Akkadevi ruled the place. There are also historical records indicating that coins were manufactured (mint) in this town during that time.

=== Coinage ===
During Western Chalukyas (973 – 1189 south), The Alupas, a feudatory, minted coins with the Kannada and Nagari legend Sri Pandya Dhanamjaya. Lakkundi and Sudi in Gadag district were the main mints (Tankhashaley) . Their heaviest gold coin was Gadyanaka (weighed 96 grains), Dramma (weighted 65 grains), Kalanju (48 grains), Kasu (15 grains), Manjadi (2.5 grains), Akkam (1.25 grains) and Pana (9.6 grain).

=== Shaivism, Pasupata school ===
Shaivism gained importance and Jainism lost towards the closing years of the Chalukya rule. Shaivism was dominant, and had several sects like Shaiva, Pasupata or Lakula, Kalamukha and Kapaliaka. The Pasupata school was important and had important centers at Balligavi, Sudi, Srisailam and other places.

=== Inscriptions ===
The Cholas claim to have captured a large number of Chalukya feudatory princes with their women and sacked and burnt Mannandippai. The Chalukya reverses are admitted in a Sudi inscription, dated in 1050 A.D., of the reign of Someshvara. It says that the 7 ministers granted the settis renewal of their corporate constitution (which had partly broken down in the stress of the war with the Cholas).

The Chola king was killed at Koppam, but the Chalukyas were also pushed back from there by Rajendra. Soon after the Chalukyas raided Kanchi, the Chola capital, burnt the city and defeated the Cholas once again. A Sudi inscription (Thursday, 20_January_1060 AD), records that king Trailokyamalla was halting at his camp Puli, a town within Sindavadi division after having made a victorious expedition to the southern region and conquered the Chola.

Sudi has several stone temples built by Maha Samanthadhipati Naga Deva in 1100 AD that have caught the attention of the Karnataka State Archeological Department. Quite a few of these structures have been cleaned up. Besides age-old structures there is also a tower (called Hude in native language) located in the center of the village. The richness of these temples can be viewed in the images posted here.

== Tourism ==
=== Twin Towered Shiva Temple ===
Twin Towered, Two Vimana, Jodakalasa Temple

Later Chalukya monument, Before 1059-60, by Nageshwara by General Nagadeva administering Sudi.

=== Shri Shiva Chidambareshwara temple ===
Adjacent to the Shri Shiva Chidambareshwara temple there is a 29-feet Lord Shiva statue in a standing position which is rare in India & it was inaugurated by Shri Vishwesha Tirtharu, Pejawara Matha, Udupi.

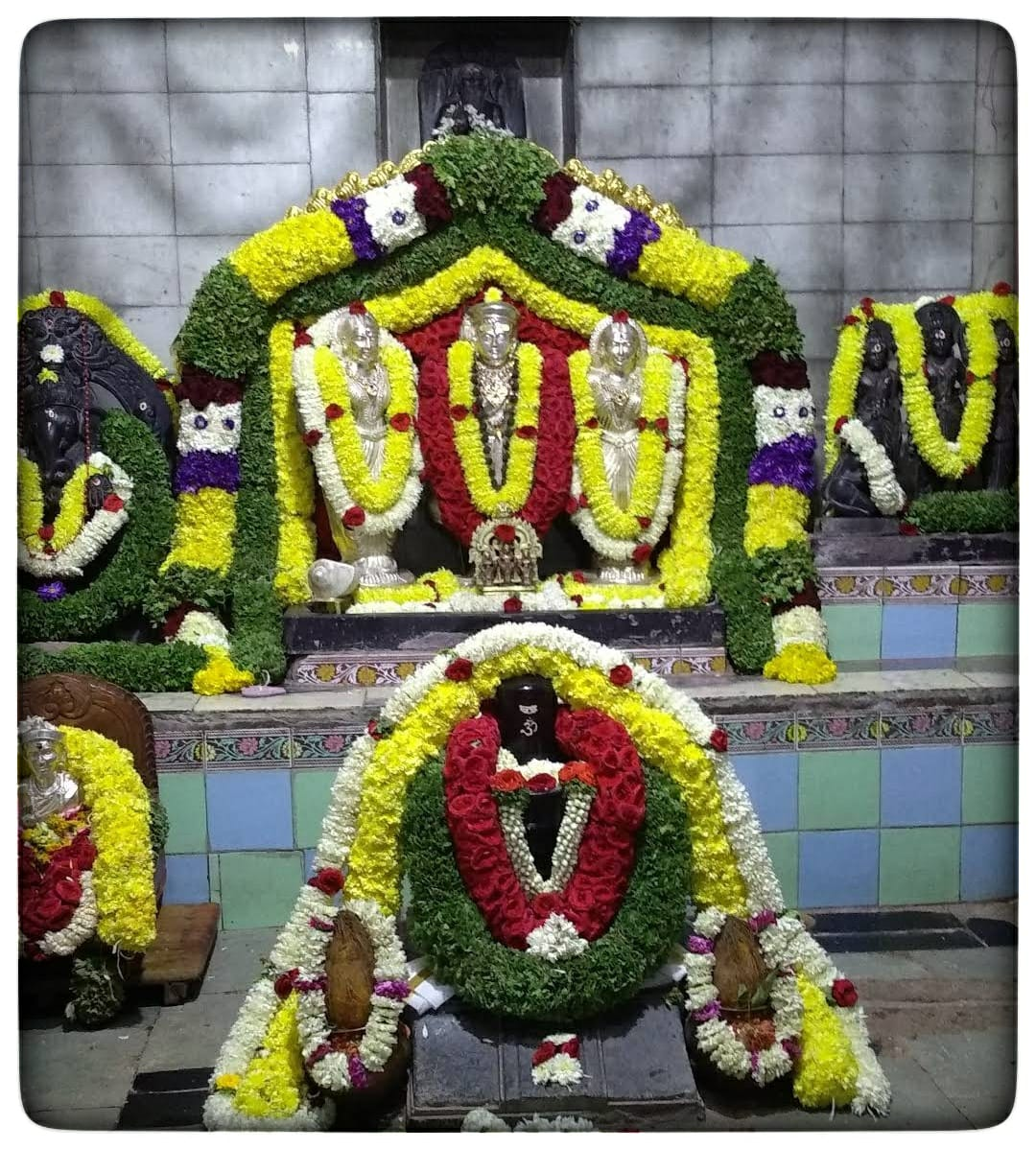

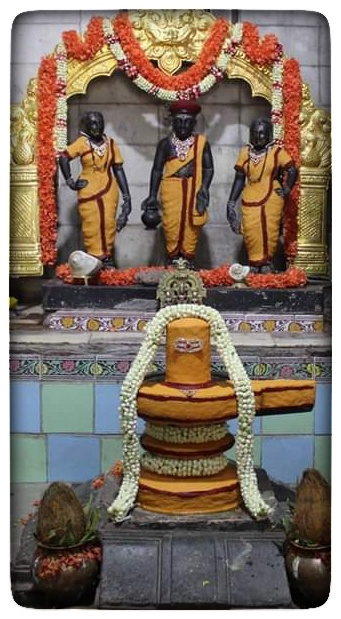

=== Mallikarjuna Temple ===
Mallikarjuna temple at Sudi is a later Chalukya (Kalyani Chalukyas) monument, 1054, Founded under princess Akkadevi Governor of Sudi

=== Naga Kunda (Well) ===
Naga Kunda (Well) at Sudi

Nagakunda literally means King cobra tank at Sudi is a carved (Inner wall) temple tank.

This is totally neglected by the people, ASI and Govt. of Karnataka. There is need of immediate conservation work to protect this monument.

=== Other monuments at Sudi ===
- Large Ganapati Statue
- Ishwara Linga in a stone made shelter
- Large Shiva linga
- Hude (Tower)

Other monuments at Sudi include a large Ganapati Statue and Nandi statue inside mantapa and a large Shiva linga.

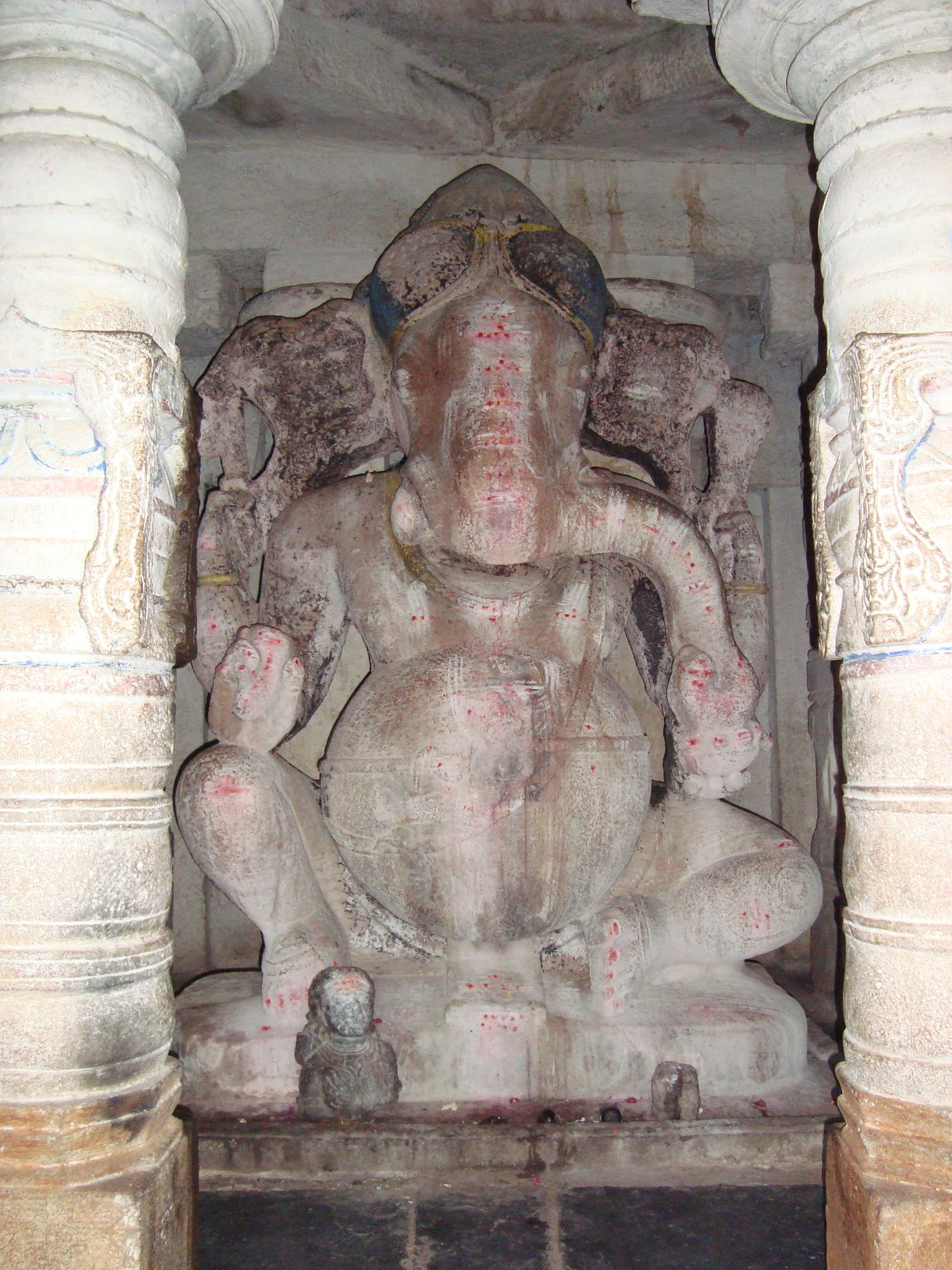
Large Ganapati statue carved in stone

Ishwara in a stone made shelter

Big Ishwara at Sudi

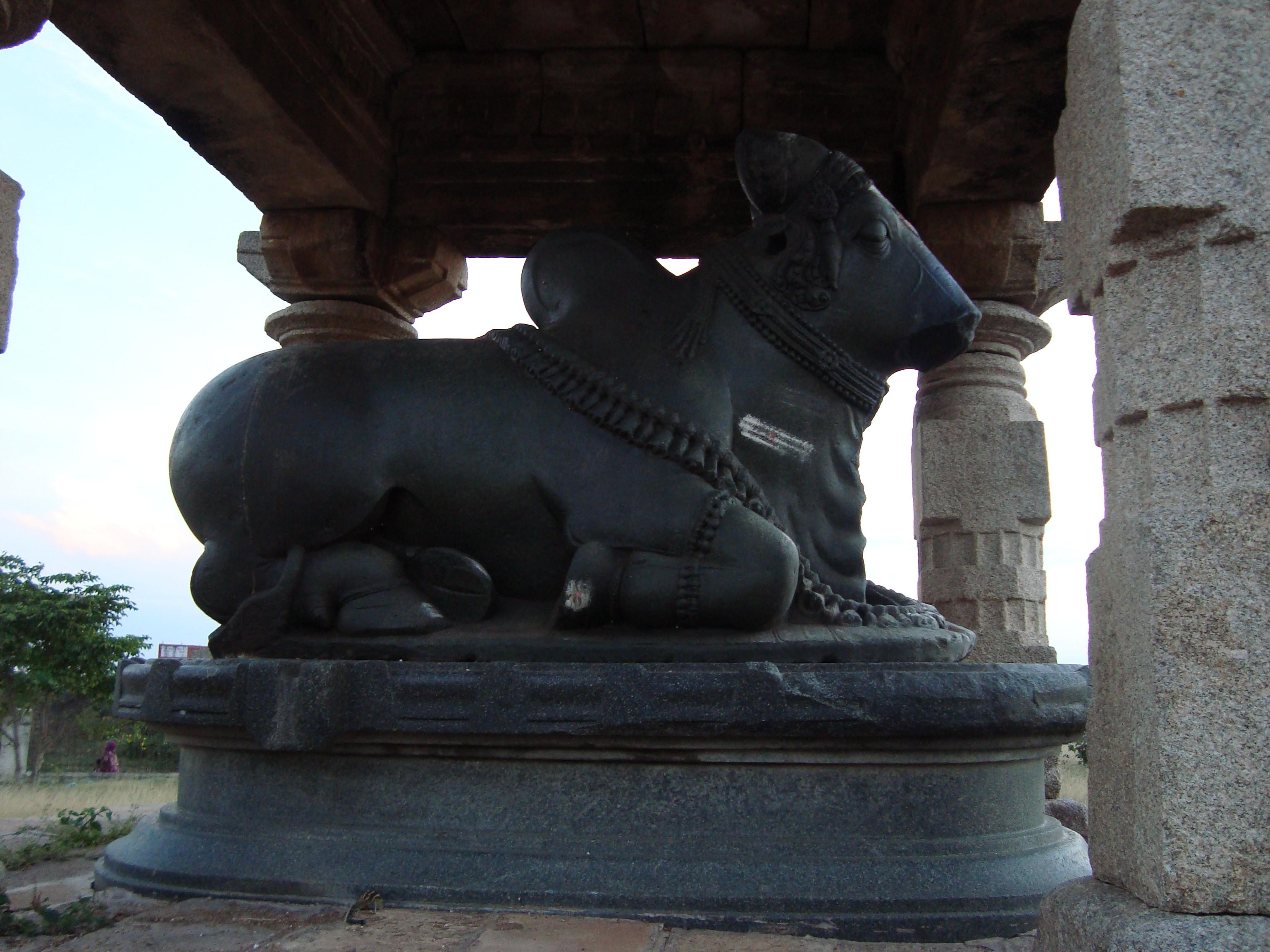
Nandi at Sudi

Hude (Tower) in Sudi

== Geography ==
It has an average elevation of 586 metres (1,923 ft). It is located adjacent to 2 streams called Hirehalla and Doddahalla and has total area of the town is 5.3 square kilometres (2.0 sq mi).

It is located 120 kilometres (75 mi) from Karnataka, 42 kilometres from Gadag and 450 kilometres from Bangalore, the state capital.

== Transport ==
The nearest airport is Hubli about 100 kilometres away. It is east of Hubli-Sholapur rail route, and the rail station (Mallapur) is 25 kilometres from the town. It is also connected by road to Hubli and Gadag. Sudi is reachable from Bangalore by a 12-hour bus ride, or with a combination of an overnight train journey from Bangalore to Ron followed by a short bus ride from Ron to Sudi.

== Demographics ==
As of 2001 India census, Sudi had a population of 6,000. Males constitute 51% of the population and females 49%. Sudi has an average literacy rate of 65%, higher than the national average of 59.5%; with 59% of the males and 41% of females literate. 14% of the population is under 6 years of age.

== See also ==
- Aihole
- Pattadakal
- Mahadeva Temple (Itagi)
- Ron
