= Bhimambika temple, Itagi =

Itagi Bhimambika
- Bheemavva temple
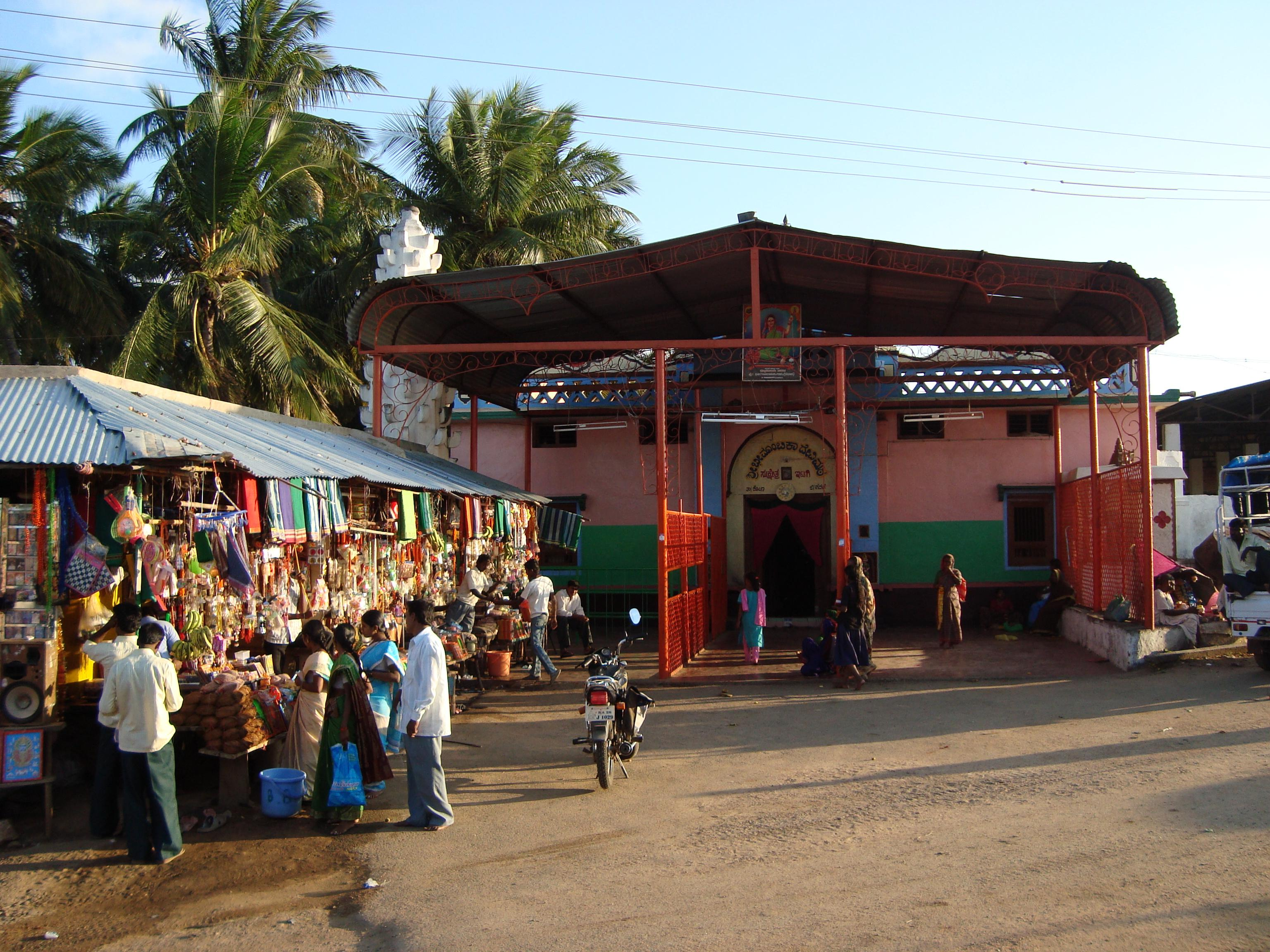

Religion
- Affiliation: Hinduism

Location
- Location: Itagi, Koppal district, Karnataka
- Interactive map of Itagi Bhimambika
- Coordinates: 15°44′17″N 75°49′29″E

Itagi Bhimambika temple is a Hindu temple located in Koppal district, Karnataka, India. It is popular with both devotees and tourists, and also has a monastery (mutt).

== Historical temple ==
Bhimambika devi was a Shiva Sharane and is the main deity of this temple. Currently 8th generation of the family members are taking care of the mutt.

== Gallery ==
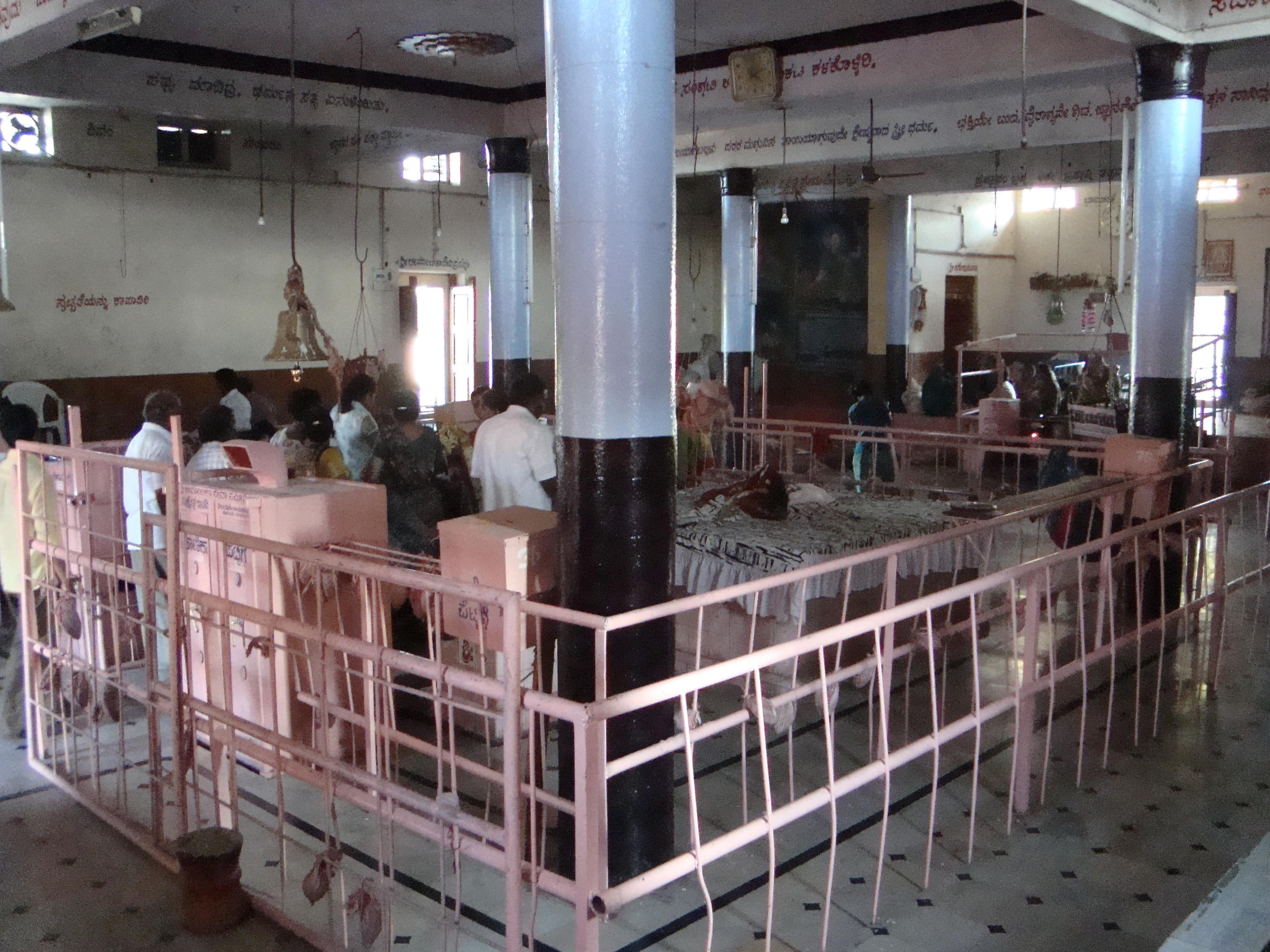
Itagi Bhimambhika mutt inside

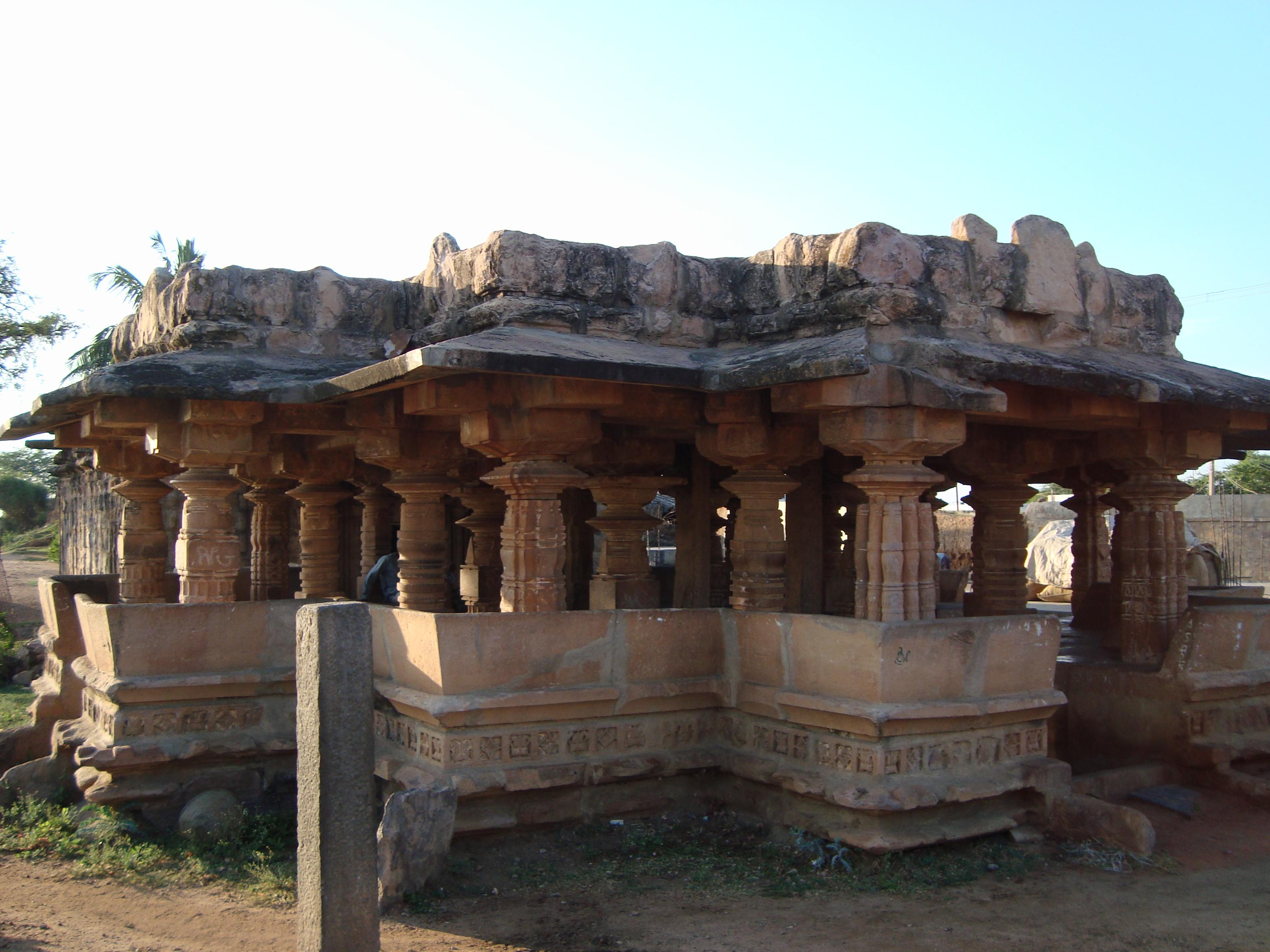
Temple exterior- Shambhu linga temple

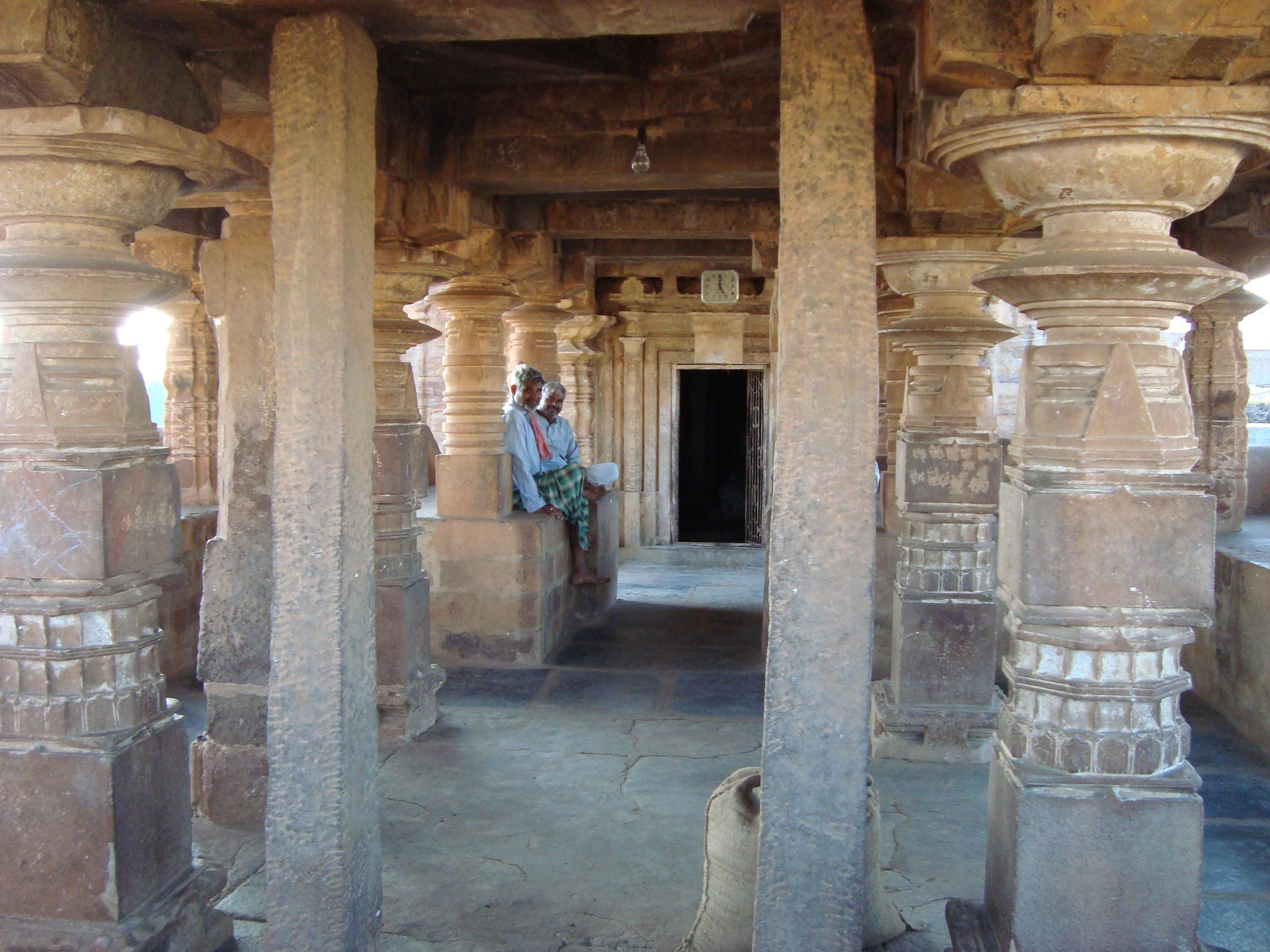
Temple interior

== See also ==
- Gajendragad
- Sudi
- North Karnataka
- Tourism in North Karnataka
- Badami, Pattadakal, Aihole, Mahakuta
- Kuknur
- Mahadeva Temple (Itagi)
- Gadag District
