= Siddharudha Swami =

Indian Hindu leader

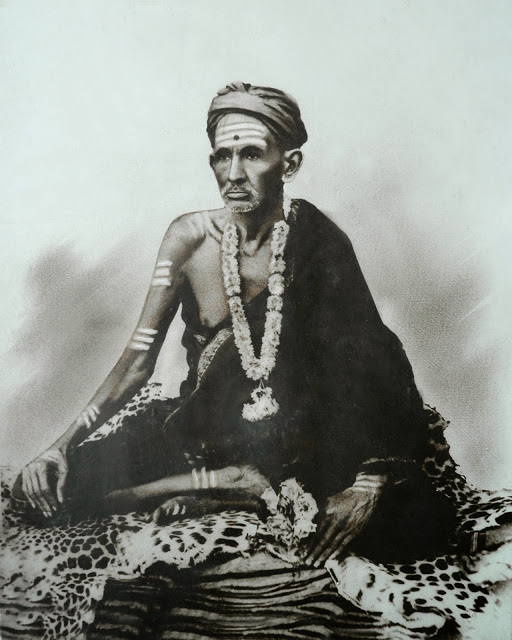
- Siddharudha Swamiji
- Title: Sadguru Siddharudha Swami

Personal life
- Born: 26 March 1836 Chalakapura, Bidar district
- Died: 21 August 1929 (aged 93) Hubballi
- Resting place: Siddharudha Matha, Hubballi, Dharwad district, Karnataka
- Parents: Gurushantappa (father); Devamallamma (mother)

Religious life
- Religion: Hinduism
- Philosophy: Shaivism

Religious career
- Teacher: Gajadanda Swami
- Disciples: Gurunatharudha Swami, Kabirdas, Kalavati Devi, Akkalkot Sharanappa, Jayakrishna, Shyamananda of Gokak, Nagabhushana Shivyogi, Channappa, Ramaroodha, Shanmukharoodha

Siddharudha Swami(26 March 1836-21 August 1929) was an Indian Hindu guru and philosopher.

== Biography ==
Sadguru Siddharudha Maharaj lived in the style of an ascetic throughout his life. Considered to be an incarnation of Shiva, one of the Trinity deities of Hinduism, Siddharudha renounced his home and his family ties at the young age of 6 years, and set himself the goal of finding his Satguru or spiritual master. Siddharudha later surrendered himself, as a student, to the realized soul Shri Gajadandaswami, and served at his Ashram.

According to the book Siddharoodh Charitra by Shivadas, Siddharudha was blessed by his guru and was asked to undertake a pilgrimage with the purpose of helping those in need, dispelling ignorance, and revealing the right path to spiritual enlightenment to those who were seeking. Henceforth, Siddharudha traveled from Kashmir to Kanyakumari, delivering the right wisdom for spiritual awakening and methodical liberation to all those who were cognizant of his exemplary standards of spiritual practice before setting down at Hubli, where he was quickly recognized for his spiritual knowledge & immaculate sainthood. People sought him out from neighbouring states for solace, satisfaction of desires and spiritual enlightenment.

He died at Hubballi in the year of 1929 and was entombed at his ashram. He was believed to be working miracles for his devotees. A proverb runs by in a native Indian Language kannada:

Siddharudhara Jolige Jagakkella holige

which signifies the food that is served at his ashram and the miracles that occur of it.

== Followers ==
- He served the people without any discrimination, having a Muslim disciple named Kabirdas (not his original name) who was known for his dedication to him.
- Parampoojya Shri Kalavati Devi (alias Aai meaning mother in Marathi), was his supreme disciple. Formerly known as Rukmabai Mallapur, she herself is well known as a supreme saint, whose samadhi is found at Shri Harimandir at Angol, Belagavi.
- He had a devoted disciple, Gurunatharudha. His samadhi is just beside the samadhi of Sri Siddharudha Swami in Hubli Matha.
- He gave sannyasa to Swami Muktananda, who studied at his ashram in Hubli until Siddharudha's death in 1929, he then left to study with a disciple of Siddharudha called Muppinarya Swami at his Sri Airani Holematt in Ranebennur Haveri District
- Shri Guru also had a disciple, Shri Shivaputra Appaji whose samadhi is situated at 20 metres distance from siddharoodh math. At present Shri Abhinav Shivaputra Swamiji is head of that math.
- Sri Iychanda Bolliappa from Devanageri village was his supreme disciple. Swami Bolliappa was a regular visitor to Siddharudha Matha located in Cherambane village, Kodagu district, Karnataka.
- Sri Sathguru Athmananda Swamy was a faithful disciple of Sri Sidharooda swamy. His samadhi is located in Athmananda colony, RT nagar Bengaluru.

== Teachings ==
Siddharudha Maharaj is an acknowledged Hindu master of the Saivite Advaita stream of Vedic thought and has followers throughout India, especially in the villages of Karnataka, Maharashtra and Telugu states.

== Honour ==
- A commemorative postage stamp honouring Siddharudha Maharaj was released by Department of Post on 6 July 2024.
